= Haitian Navy =

- Marine Haitienne (French); Marin Ayisyèn (Haitian Creole)
- Active: 1802–1915; 1970–1995; 2017–present
- Country: Haiti
- Type: Navy
- Role: Naval warfare
- Size: <12 (2025)
- Part of: Armed Forces of Haiti
- Garrison/HQ: Grand Quartier Général; Port-au-Prince
- Anniversaries: February 1 1806
- Engagements: Markomannia incident

Commanders
- Nominal Head: Prime Minister Alix Didier Fils-Aimé (acting)
- Minister of Defense: Mario Andrésol
- Commander-in-Chief of the Armed Forces: Lt.Gen. Derby Guerrier (acting)
- Commander of the Navy: Vacant
- Notable commanders: Admiral Hammerton Killick

The Haitian Navy (French: Marine Haitienne; Haitian Creole: Marin Ayisyèn), is the naval branch of the armed forces of Haiti. It dates back to the Haitian Revolution, becoming the Military Navy (Marine Militaire) after the declaration of Independence. The constitutional duty of the Navy is to protect the maritime sovereignty of Haiti: It is to secure and defend Haitian waters that include the Atlantic Ocean (northern Haiti) and the Caribbean Sea which embraces the remainder of the Haiti's coastline. The Navy is responsible with securing the lakes inside the country, and land areas under its direct area of command.

Like the rest of the armed forces, it was reinstated by the late-President Jovenel Moïse in 2017 after being disbanded in 1995 by executive order, by President Jean-Bertrand Aristide.

The acronym "MH", (French: Marine Haïtienne) is used as the ship prefix for all Haitian Navy ships.

== History ==
=== 1802–1808 ===
Although the Indigenous Army had naval forces throughout the Revolutionary War, consisting of captured ships and boats, documentation naming the "Naval Army" or "Military Navy" only date back to early 1804. The first law officially organizing the Military Navy, was signed on February 1, 1806 by Jean-Jacques Dessalines after his meeting with Francisco de Miranda.

=== 1860–1915 ===
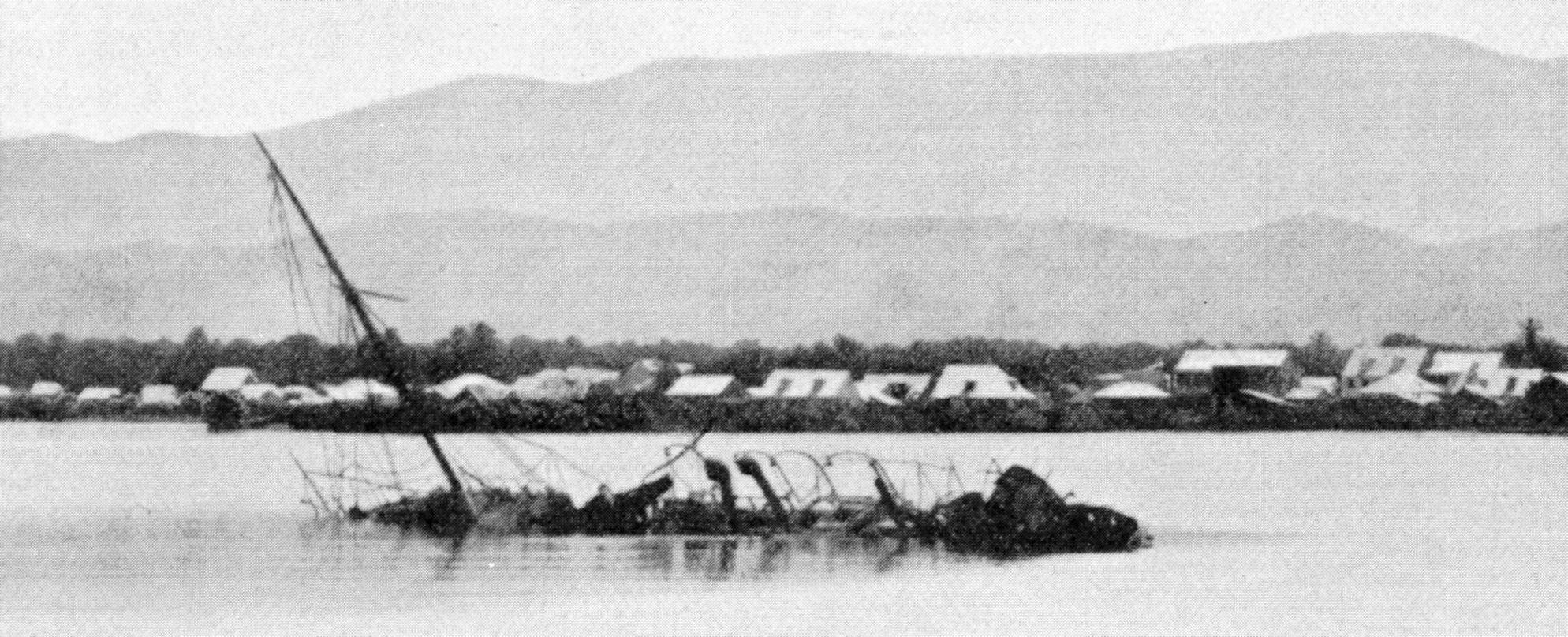
Crête-à-Pierrot after being attacked by SMS Panther in 1902

By the early 1900s Haiti had the largest fleet of any Caribbean country, though its ships were crewed by foreigners and it mostly consisted of outdated gunboats. The largest vessel in the Haitian navy was the Italian cruiser Umbria, which was purchased in 1910 but it sank in less than a year because of the crew's inexperience.

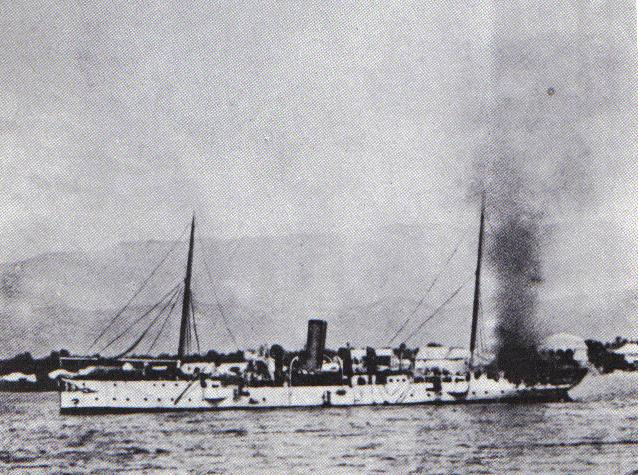
The "Crête-à-Pierrot"

The crown jewel of the Haitian navy, the Crête-à-Pierrot, sunk during the Markomannia incident when the SMS Panther (1901) shot it down after Admiral Hammerton Killick blew the aft magazines to avoid capture. He would die in that attack as he chose to go down with his ship, along with 4 crew members. When the U.S. occupation in 1915, almost all of the navy's ships were sold. After 1915, only two unarmed schooners were kept. They would become part of the Haitian coast guard within the Gendarmerie of Haiti, and later the Garde d'Haïti.

Before 1915 the fleet included the following:

- Ex-Italian cruiser Umbria (1910–1911) renamed Consul Gostrück
- gunboat Crête-à-Pierrot (1896–1902)
- gunboat Liberté (1910–1911)
- gunboat 22 Decebre 1804 (1860–1912)
- gunboat 1804 (1875–1912)
- gunboat Dessalines (1883–1915)
- gunboat Toussaint-Louverture (1886–1915)
- gunboat Capois La Mort (1893–1915)
- gunboat Alexander Petion (1865–1915)
- Two auxiliary schooners

=== 1970–1995 ===
On April 21, 1970, three units — La Crête-à-Pierrot, Vertières (both 100-ton coast cutters) and the Jean-Jacques Dessalines (formally the USS Tonawanda (AN-89)) — mutinied and shelled the Presidential Palace in Port-au-Prince. They were driven off by fighter aircraft and then interred themselves in the Guantanamo Bay Naval Base. The US disarmed the vessels and relocated them initially to Puerto Rico and then back to Haiti. Duvalier celebrated this event by renaming the Coast Guard the "Haitian Navy" (La Marine Haitienne).

In 1973, Duvalier attempted to expand this with the purchase of up to 24 small boats, allegedly to include PT boats, but these plans came to naught.

In 1976, the Haitian Navy purchased five small patrol craft from Sewart Seacraft of Berwick, Louisiana. The Dessalines was returned to the United States, while the Admiral Killick, Artibonite and the Savannah and the six 83-foot cutters were stricken.

In 1978, the USS Samoset, a Sotoyomo-class tugboat, was acquired and recommissioned as the Henri Christophe. The planned sale of a sister ship fell through.

After the armed forces were disbanded in 1995, the ships from were handed over to the Haitian Coast Guard, this time within the Haitian National Police.

The Haitian Navy in the late 1980s and early 1990s included the following ships, along with 165 servicemen:

Class	Origin	Quantity	Ships	Combat displacement	Notes
Tugboats
Sotoyomo-class tugboat	United States	1	Henri Christophe (MH 20)	860 tons	Launched in 1944 and transferred to Haiti in 1978. Removed from service in 1993.
Coastal patrol craft
3812-VCF-class patrol boat	United States	9	Le Maroon (MH 11); Oge (MH 12); Chavannes (MH 13); Capois (MH 14); Baukman (MH 15); Makandal (MH 16); Charlemagne Perrault (MH 17); Sonthonax (MH 18); Bois Rond Tonnerre (MH 19)	15 tons	Acquired between 1980 and 1981. Four boats removed from service and used for spare parts in 1991–92 (MH 11, 12, 15, 16). All boats no longer operational after 1995.
Swift-class patrol boat	United States	3	Jean Claude Duvalier (MH 21); MH 22; MH 23	33 tons	Acquired in 1976. All removed from service by 1995.

== Culture ==
Haitian Navy Day is September 6, corresponding to the day of Admiral Killick's heroic death in battle against a foreign enemy force.

== Training and Formation ==
Haitian Ambassador to Argentina, Dr. Vilbert Bélizaire, secured scholarships with the Escuela Naval Militar of the Argentine Navy, an initiative in collaboration with the Haitian Ministry of defense with the objective of reinforcing the Haitian Armed Forces. Haitian cadets have attended and graduated from the officer school, the NCO school, and the professionals program, as part of an interinstitutional agreement signed between both countries. A handful of cadets are still in Argentina receiving military education and training.

As part of defense cooperation signed between the governments of Haiti and Colombia, the Colombian Navy will be training 250 Haitian sailors. Colombian minister of Defense Pedro Arnulfo Sánchez announce the commander-in-chief of the Armed Forces of Haiti, Lieutenant general Derby Guerrier, will travel with the designated commander of the Haitian Navy to Colombia to assess, observe the training grounds and set the timeline to begin basic training. The cost of this training will be covered mostly by Colombia, via the Agencia de la Presidencia para la Cooperación Internacional. International partners like the United States, France, the United Kingdom, the Netherlands, and the Dominican Republic, may also contribute to this project. The training is anticipated to cost USD $2.5 million along with the other branches being trained. The Colombian Navy committed to training 250 recruits starting late 2025.

As of July 2025, the Haitian Navy has a strength of a dozen personnel, all officers and non-commissioned officers who graduated from the Escuela Naval Militar of the Argentine Navy. In a meeting between Defense Minister Andresol and Argentine Chargé d'Affaires Pablo Andre Graziano in June 2026, the Argentine government made two spots available for Haitian cadets at the Naval Academy.

== Equipment ==
The Haitian government plans on acquiring ships from Miami, including three 110-foot Island class patrol boat, to reinforce its maritime capacities in the defense of the bay and port of Port-au-Prince, and fight piracy activities along the metropolitan coastline.

A delegation of military officers and staffers of the Ministry of Defense traveled to Rio de Janeiro,Brazil, to attend LAAD Defence & Security 2025. They met Colombian Shipyard COTECMAR, who confirmed they were in talks to provide for Haiti's naval needs.

== Notable Sailors ==
- Admiral Hammerton Killick

== Sources ==
- Gardiner, Robert; Chumbley, Stephen, eds. (1995). Conway's All the World's Fighting Ships 1947-1995. London: Conway Maritime Press. ISBN 1-55750-132-7.
- Metz, Helen Chapin (2001). Dominican Republic and Haiti: Country Studies. Washington, D.C.: Federal Research Division, Library of Congress. LCCN 2001023524.
- Sharpe, Richard (1989). Jane's Fighting Ships 1989-90. Coulsdon, Surrey: Jane's Information Group. ISBN 0-7106-0886-1.
- Sharpe, Richard (1994). Jane's Fighting Ships 1994-95. Coulsdon, Surrey: Jane's Information Group. ISBN 0-7106-1161-7.
- Smigielski, Adam & Jaskula, Andrzej M. (1986). "Haiti". In Gardiner, Robert & Gray, Randal (eds.). Conway's All the World's Fighting Ships 1906–1921. London: Conway Maritime Press. ISBN 0-85177-245-5.
- Walker, Thomas C. (2004). "The U.S. Navy in the Caribbean 1903-1920". Presence, Prevention, and Persuasion: A Historical Analysis of Military Force and Political Influence. Lanham: Lexington Books. ISBN 978-0-7391-0726-3.
