= Bombardment of Fort San Carlos =

Military action

Coordinates: 10.98620°N 71.60741°W

- Part of the Venezuelan Crisis
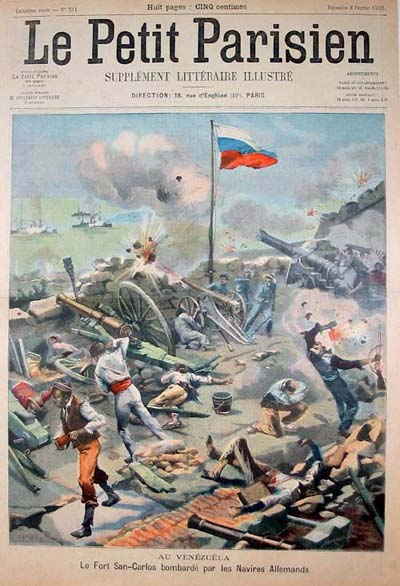
- Front page of "Le Petit Parisien" depicting the bombardment of Fort San Carlos
Date	January 17, 1903
Location	San Carlos de la Barra Fortress, Venezuela
Result	Venezuelan victory

Belligerents
United States of Venezuela	German Empire

Commanders and leaders
(Venezuela) Jorge Antonio Bello	(German Empire) Richard Eckermann

Strength
4 artillery pieces 1 fort	1 light cruiser 1 gunboat

Casualties and losses
3–6 wounded	1 gunboat damaged
- 25–40 civilians killed

The Bombardment of Fort San Carlos occurred during the Venezuelan Crisis on January 17, 1903, when two warships of the Imperial German Navy tried to penetrate into Lake Maracaibo but were repulsed by the garrison of Fort San Carlos de la Barra after a brief exchange of fire.

== Bombardment ==
On January 17, the gunboat SMS Panther and unprotected cruiser SMS Falke were chasing a merchant schooner which had evaded the blockade and entered the lake. Both ships intended to enter the lake and blockade the city of Maracaibo.

Guarding the entrance that connects the lake with the Gulf of Venezuela was the Castle of San Carlos de la Barra. The shallow waters that connected Lake Maracaibo with the sea were only passable by major ships in the strait that separated San Carlos from the island of Zapara, and even there a local pilot was needed to navigate the sandbanks and shallow waters of the passage.

The captain of Panther, not knowing the bathymetry of shallow waters of the site, ran aground on sandbars between the islands of San Carlos and Zapara, near the Castle of San Carlos de la Barra, commanded by General Jorge Antonio Bello. This was within range of the Castle's artillery. Soon after, the ships began to bombard the fortress and the Venezuelan troops responded. The Venezuelan artillerymen Manuel Quevedo and Carlos José Cárdenas, with an 80 mm German-made Krupp cannon, scored several hits on Panther, leaving it severely damaged. After half an hour of combat, the Germans withdrew. Six people were injured in the Castle of San Carlos. Three days later, on 20 January, the German protected cruiser SMS Vineta arrived from Puerto Cabello in relief of the damaged Panther. Vineta bombarded the Castle of San Carlos for eight hours. Intentionally or not, the ship's fire also reached the nearby port, killing between 25 and 40 civilians.

== Aftermath ==
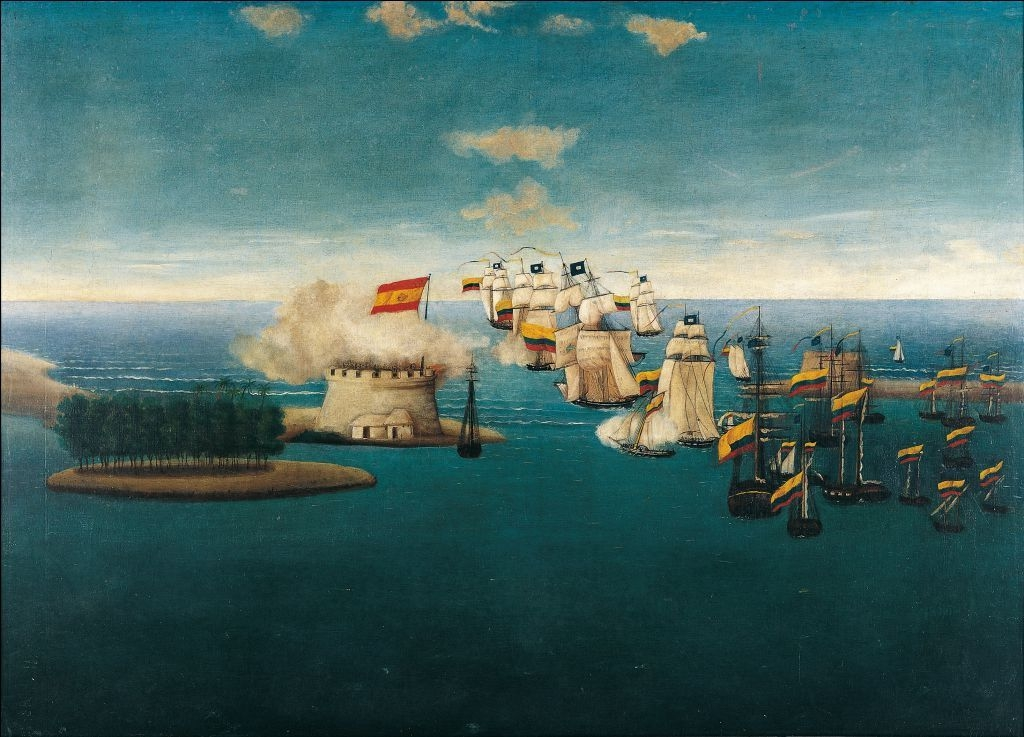
A painting of Fort San Carlos in 1823. The fort retained its layout eighty years later when it confronted SMS Panther.

Four days later Panther returned to reduce the fort, accompanied by the protected cruiser SMS Vineta, with bigger guns. For eight hours the ships bombarded the fort. The Venezuelan garrison, although outgunned, fired back, but by the end of the conflict Fort San Carlos was in ruins and burning. Shells also hit the nearby port; whether intentional or not, the bombardment killed 25 civilians, prompting the arrest of German and British citizens by Venezuelan authorities.

The action had not been approved by the British commander of the "Particular Service Squadron" Commodore Robert Archibald James Montgomerie, who had been warned by Admiralty after the Puerto Cabello bombardment of 13 December not to engage in such action without consulting London; the message was not passed to the German commander, who had been told previously to follow the English commander's lead. The incident caused "considerable negative reaction in the United States against Germany". The Germans said that the Venezuelans fired first, which the British concurred with but declared the bombardment "unfortunate and inopportune" nonetheless.

The German Foreign Office said that Panther's attempted incursion into the lagoon of Maracaibo had been motivated by a desire to ensure the effective blockade of Maracaibo port, by preventing it from being supplied across the adjacent Colombian border. Subsequently US president Theodore Roosevelt informed the German Ambassador that Admiral George Dewey had orders to keep the Caribbean fleet ready to sail from Puerto Rico to Venezuela at an hour's notice.

== See also ==
- Gunboat diplomacy
- Second Moroccan Crisis
