= Crête-à-Pierrot =

Crête-à-Pierrot (Little Peter's Crest), a location in Haiti, can refer to:

- Battle of Crête-à-Pierrot, a major engagement during the Haitian Revolution in 1802
- Haitian gunboat Crête-à-Pierrot, named for the battle
