= Wilberg =

Wilberg is a surname. Notable people with the surname include:

- Christian Wilberg (1839–1882), German painter
- Mack Wilberg (born 1955), composer, arranger, conductor, music director of the Mormon Tabernacle Choir
- Sverre Wilberg (1929–1996), Norwegian actor
- Hermann Wilberg (1880–1946), German mining engineer
- Helmuth Wilberg (1 June 1880 – 20 November 1941), German Luftwaffe General of the Air Force

== See also ==
- Wilberg Mine, coal mine in Emery County, Utah, approximately 12 miles northwest of Orangeville
- Vilberh, Ukrainian rendering of the surname
