= SMS Vineta (1897) =

Protected cruiser of the German Imperial Navy

- Vineta in 1902

History

German Empire
- Name: Vineta
- Namesake: SMS Vineta
- Builder: Kaiserliche Werft, Danzig
- Laid down: 10 August 1896
- Launched: 9 December 1897
- Commissioned: 13 September 1899
- Decommissioned: 16 November 1914
- Stricken: 6 December 1919
- Fate: Scrapped in 1920

General characteristics
- Class & type: Victoria Louise-class cruiser
- Displacement: Normal: 5,885 t (5,792 long tons); Full load: 6,705 t (6,599 long tons)
- Length: 110.5 m (363 ft)
- Beam: 17.6 m (58 ft)
- Draft: 7.08 m (23.2 ft)
- Installed power: 12 × Dürr boilers; 10,000 PS (9,900 ihp)
- Propulsion: 3 × triple-expansion steam engines; 3 × screw propellers
- Speed: 19.6 knots (36.3 km/h; 22.6 mph)
- Range: 3,412 nmi (6,319 km; 3,926 mi) at 12 knots (22 km/h; 14 mph)
- Complement: 31 officers; 446 enlisted men
- Armament: 2 × 21 cm (8.3 in) guns; 8 × 15 cm (5.9 in) guns; 10 × 8.8 cm (3.5 in) guns; 10 × 3.7 cm (1.5 in) Maxim machine cannon; 3 × 45 cm (17.7 in) torpedo tubes
- Armor: Deck: 4 to 10 cm (1.6 to 3.9 in); Turrets: 10 cm; Casemates: 10 cm; Conning tower: 15 cm (5.9 in)

SMS Vineta was a protected cruiser of the Victoria Louise class, built for the German Imperial Navy (Kaiserliche Marine) in the 1890s. Vineta was laid down at the AG Vulcan shipyard in 1895, launched in April 1897, and commissioned into the Navy in July 1898. The ship, named for the earlier screw frigate SMS Vineta, was armed with a battery of two 21 cm guns and eight 15 cm guns and had a top speed of 19 knots (35 km/h; 22 mph). Though the five Victoria Louise-class cruisers proved to be disappointing in some ways, they marked the beginning of a decade of German cruiser construction.

Vineta served abroad in the American Station for the first several years of her career. During her deployment in the Americas, she participated in the Venezuela Crisis of 1902–1903 and shelled several Venezuelan fortresses, including the bombardment of Fort San Carlos. Notably, the ship suffered an ammunition fire during the cruise, which informed the navy about the instability of its propellant charges, leading to reformulation that spared several German warships from destruction during battles in World War I. Vineta returned to Germany in 1905, by way of the country's colonies in German South West Africa and German West Africa. She was used as a torpedo training ship from 1906 to 1908.

She was modernized in 1909–1911, after which she was used as a training ship for naval cadets, conducting training cruises in the early 1910s. In November 1912, while cruising in the Mediterranean Sea, she participated in an international naval protest of the First Balkan War. During another training voyage to the Caribbean Sea in early 1914, she embarked the deposed Haitian president Michel Oreste as he fled into exile. At the outbreak of World War I later in 1914, Vineta was mobilized into V Scouting Group, but served in front-line duty only briefly. She was used as a barracks ship after 1915, and ultimately sold for scrapping in 1920.

== Design ==
In the early 1890s, elements in the German naval command structure grappled with what type of cruiser ought to be built to fulfill the various needs of the fleet. The Reichsmarineamt (RMA—Imperial Navy Office) preferred to build a combination of large cruisers of around 6,000 t (5,900 long tons) along the lines of SMS Kaiserin Augusta and significantly smaller vessels of about 1,500 t (1,476 long tons) to support them, while the Oberkommando der Marine (Naval High Command) argued that a uniform force of 3,000 t (2,953 long tons) cruisers was preferable. In the event, the RMA carried the day and three 6,000-ton cruisers were authorized in 1895; this was in part due to the intervention of Kaiser Wilhelm II and in part due to comparisons with foreign contemporaries, like the United States' Baltimore and the Austro-Hungarian Kaiserin und Königin Maria Theresia. The experience of Japanese cruisers during the contemporaneous First Sino-Japanese War showed the benefit of larger 21 cm (8.3 in) guns, which were adopted for the main battery of the Victoria Louise class. For the 1896/1897 fiscal year, another pair of ships were authorized, and one of these became Vineta.

They resembled the larger Kaiser Friedrich III-class battleships, designed at the same time, albeit at reduced scale. The new cruisers proved to be unsatisfactory as fleet cruisers, because they were too slow and they lacked sufficient armor protection. They nevertheless provided good service as overseas cruisers and later as training ships. They (along with the contemporaneous armored cruiser Fürst Bismarck) nevertheless marked the beginning of a trend of German cruiser construction that lasted through the Scharnhorst-class cruisers built a decade later.

=== Characteristics ===
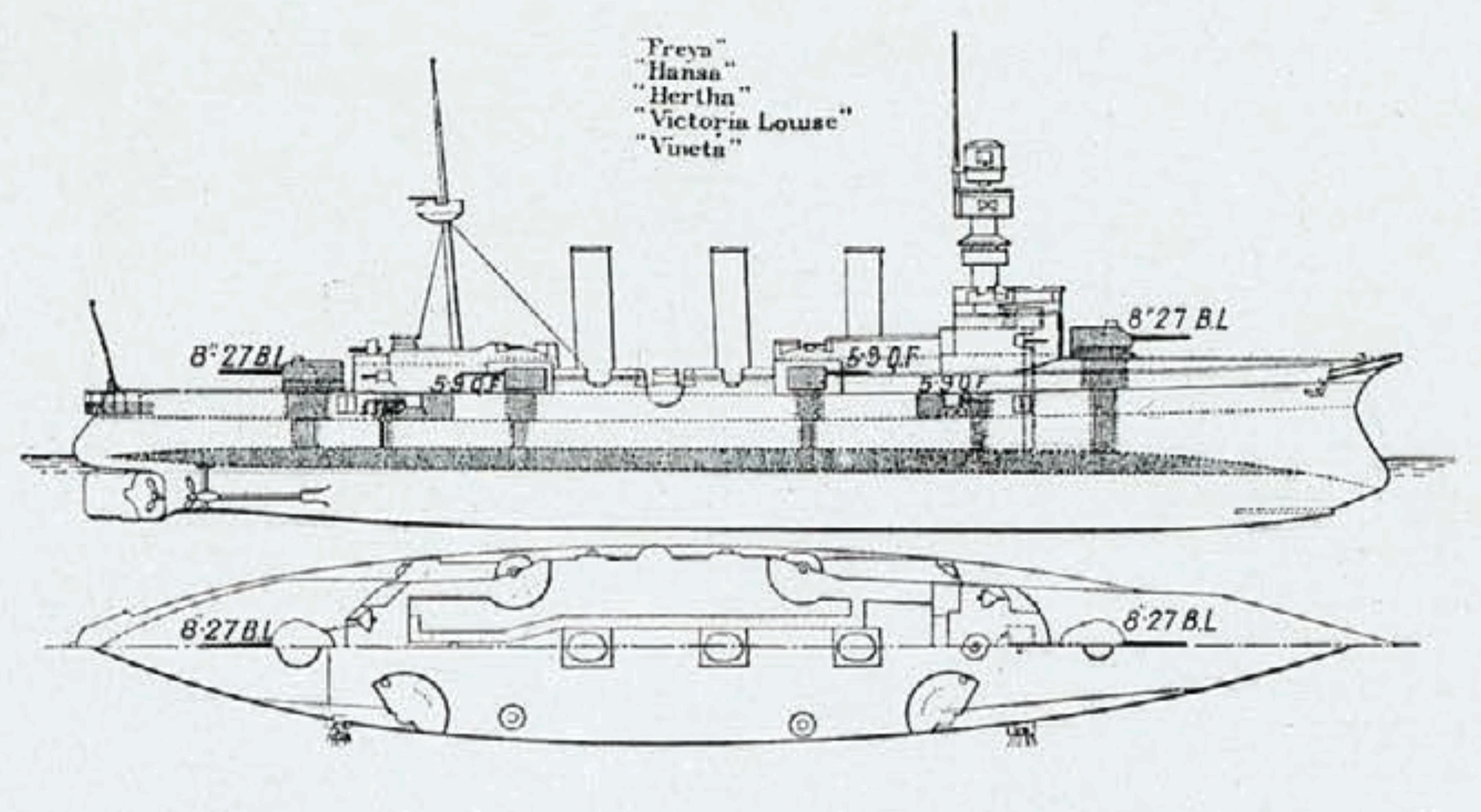
Plan and profile drawing of the Victoria Louise class

Vineta was 110.5 meters (362 ft 6 in) long overall and had a beam of 17.6 m (57 ft 9 in) and a draft of 7.08 m (23 ft 3 in) forward. As designed, she displaced 5,885 t (5,792 long tons), and at full load, her displacement rose to 6,705 t (6,599 long tons). The ship's superstructure included a large conning tower forward and a smaller deck house further aft. She was fitted with a heavy military mast atop the conning tower and a lighter pole mast further aft. Her hull featured a flared clipper bow combined with a pronounced ram. The ship had a crew of 31 officers and 446 enlisted men.

Her propulsion system consisted of three vertical 4-cylinder triple-expansion steam engines, each driving a single screw propeller. Steam was provided by twelve coal-fired Dürr boilers, which were vented through three funnels. Her engines were rated for 10,000 metric horsepower (9,900 ihp), and provided a top speed of 19 knots (35 km/h; 22 mph). Coal storage amounted to 950 t (930 long tons; 1,050 short tons) if all available spaces were used. The ship had a range of approximately 3,412 nautical miles (6,319 km; 3,926 mi) at the more economical speed of 12 knots (22 km/h; 14 mph).

The ship was armed with a main battery of two 21 cm (8.3 in) SK L/40 guns in single gun turrets, one forward and one aft. The guns were supplied with 58 rounds of ammunition each. They had a range of 16,300 m (53,500 ft). Vineta also carried a secondary battery of eight 15 cm (5.9 in) SK L/40 guns. Four were mounted in turrets amidships and the other four were placed in casemates, two abreast the conning tower and the others abreast the mainmast. These guns had a range of 13,700 m (44,900 ft). She also carried ten 8.8 cm (3.5 in) SK L/30 guns for defense against torpedo boats. The gun armament was rounded out by ten 3.7 cm (1.5 in) Maxim machine cannon. She was also equipped with three 45 cm (17.7 in) torpedo tubes with eight torpedoes, two launchers were mounted on the broadside and the third was in the bow, all below the waterline.

The ship was protected with Krupp armor; her deck was 4 cm (1.6 in) on the horizontal with sloped sides that were 10 cm (3.9 in) thick. Her main and secondary battery turrets had 10 cm thick sides and the secondary casemates had the same level of protection. The conning tower had 15 cm thick sides.

=== Modifications ===
After being employed as a torpedo testing ship in the mid-1900s, Vineta received a trainable torpedo tube on the starboard broadside position for testing purposes. The mount proved to be unsuccessful, and it was not employed on other warships.

Between 1909 and 1911, Vineta underwent a major reconstruction at the Kaiserliche Werft (Imperial Shipyard) in Danzig. This included replacing her boilers with new Navy-type models, and the funnels were reduced to two. Her military mast was removed to reduce the top-heaviness of the ship, which improved her handling in turns. Two of the 15 cm guns and all of the Maxim guns were removed, and an eleventh 8.8 cm SK L/30 gun was installed, along with three 8.8 cm SK L/35 guns. She was disarmed entirely by 1916.

== Service history ==
Vineta in dry dock in Newport News, United States in 1901

Vineta was ordered under the contract name "M" and was laid down at the Kaiserliche Werft in Danzig on 10 August 1896. (Note: German warships were ordered under provisional names. Additions to the fleet were given a single letter; ships intended to replace older or lost vessels were ordered as "Ersatz (name of the ship to be replaced)".) She was launched on 9 December 1897, and the method used was unusual for the time. Rather than a traditional slipway, the shipyard moved ships sideways onto a floating dry dock, which was then submerged to float the hull. Admiral Friedrich von Hollmann gave a speech at the ceremony. She was named after the earlier screw frigate SMS Vineta. After completing fitting-out work, which included installing facilities for a divisional staff, she was commissioned into the German navy on 13 September 1899. Under the command of Kapitän zur See (KzS–Captain at Sea) Hermann da Fonseca-Wollheim, the ship then began sea trials, which lasted until 24 March 1900; following these, she was sent back to the shipyard for repairs. In April, KzS Erich von der Groeben relieved Fonseca-Wollheim, but he then died of a stroke on 19 May before Vineta could embark on her first major cruise abroad. As a result, Fonseca-Wollheim resumed command of the vessel. The ship then moved to Kiel to make preparations for the cruise, which began with Vineta's departure from Kiel on 26 May, bound for South America.

=== American Station ===
The ship reached Saint Lucia in the Lesser Antilles on 14 June, where she joined the American Station, which had been disbanded for several years; the previous station ship, the unprotected cruiser Geier, had been transferred away in 1898. Vineta then began a cruise along the coast of Venezuela and then through the Caribbean Sea. She visited New Orleans, United States, and then several ports in Mexico through January and February 1901 before returning to the Venezuelan coast. The ship arrived in Trinidad on 6 April, and from there, began a voyage south to visit the eastern coast of South America. In May, Vineta inspected Margarita Island off the coast of Venezuela for its potential as a naval base, but the Germans determined the port was insufficient for their purposes. The ship proceeded further southward, steaming as far as La Plata, Argentina, before returning north.

She arrived back in Venezuelan waters by 1 August, stopping in La Guaira. While there, she received orders to remain in the area to protect German nationals and business interests during the Thousand Days' War that involved Venezuela and Colombia. The German naval command sent the unprotected cruiser Falke and the old screw corvettes Stein and Moltke. In addition to protecting Germans in the area, the deployment was intended as a show of force to compel the Venezuelan government to make reparations for grievances related to internal conflicts in the 1890s. On 6 October, two sailors from Vineta were arrested in Caracas, Venezuela, prompting the cruiser to send a landing party ashore in La Guaira to demand their release, which was quickly granted. Also that month, a German merchant vessel was fired upon off the coast of Venezuela; both of these incidents were resolved diplomatically. As the threat to German interests in the region proved to be less than expected, Vineta was sent to Newport News, United States, for periodic maintenance that lasted from 26 November to 17 December.

While Vineta was under repair, KzS Oskar Stiege arrived to replace Fonseca-Wollheim. During that period, the Germans left Falke and Stein in La Guaira, but at the end of the year, Stein and Moltke left for home, though they were replaced by the light cruiser Gazelle, which arrived in February 1902. Vineta returned to Newport News for another overhaul from 19 May to 25 September. While the ship was in dry dock in June, Stiege fell ill and the ship's executive officer, Kapitänleutnant (Captain Lieutenant) Peter Lengerke, temporarily took command until KzS Georg Scheder arrived in August. After emerging from dry dock in September, Vineta steamed to Port-au-Prince, Haiti. Earlier that month, in the middle of the civil war, the German gunboat Panther had sunk the Haitian gunboat Crête-à-Pierrot over the Markomannia incident. Falke arrived later, allowing Vineta to return to Venezuelan waters.

==== Venezuelan crisis of 1902–1903 ====
Vineta and Panther in the distance, shelling Fort San Carlos in January 1902

By this time, tensions between Venezuela and Britain, Germany, and Italy had risen significantly over measures that the Venezuelan president, Cipriano Castro, had imposed to try to suppress a rebellion, including a blockade of several coastal cities. Castro also suspended payments toward foreign debts. The German naval command instructed their ships in the region to free any German merchant vessels that were seized by the Venezuelan Navy by force if necessary. No incidents involving German ships materialized, however, but the European powers concluded an agreement on 1 December to put an end to the blockade. By that time, Germany had assembled a cruiser division led by Vineta, and including Falke, Gazelle, and Panther, along with the training ships Stein and Charlotte. The unit was formally organized as the East American Cruiser Division, and Scheder was given the title of Kommodore (Commodore).

On 7 December, the Europeans gave Castro an ultimatum, which he ignored. Scheder then began to seize or neutralize Venezuelan warships, along with the British protected cruiser HMS Retribution and the destroyer HMS Quail, which were placed under his command. The ships carried out operations against the Venezuelan Navy between 10 and 14 December. Scheder sent Gazelle to capture the gunboat Restaurador while Vineta responded to a request for assistance from the German consul in La Guaira. She and Retribution send landing parties ashore to defend the consulate and then to protect British nationals in the area. On the 13th, the British merchant ship SS Topaze had been boarded and its crew arrested by Venezuelan forces. In response, the British protected cruiser HMS Charybdis bombarded the forts at Puerto Cabello, and enlisted Vineta in the attack. The ships shelled the fortresses Libertador and Vigia, but the shellfire did little damage. So the British and German ships sent landing parties ashore to damage both with explosives. They then freed Topaze and her crew. The brazenness of the Anglo-German attack on the port convinced Castro to order the release of all British and German nationals who had been arrested.

Because Castro refused to give into German and British demands, those countries declared a blockade of the Venezuelan coast on 20 December, which Italy also joined. At that time, the Germans had at their disposal Vineta, Falke, Gazelle, Panther, Charlotte, Stosch, and Restaurador, which had been put in service with a German crew. The HAPAG steamer SS Sibiria served as the division's collier. By that time, the British Vice Admiral Archibald Douglas had arrived aboard his flagship, the protected cruiser Ariadne; as the most senior naval officer in the area, he relieved Scheder as the commander of the international squadron. On 4 January 1903, the German landing party was sent to occupy Puerto Cabello and seize the ships in the harbor.

On 17 January, Panther attacked Fort San Carlos in Maracaibo, but was repulsed after her bow 10.5 cm (4.1 in) gun jammed and could not be returned to action; she could not maneuver in the confined waters to bring her other guns to bear. The Venezuelans viewed the action as a victory, as the German ship had been forced to retreat without inflicting any damage; the Germans viewed it as an affront to their honor that must be corrected. Accordingly, Vineta therefore was sent to silence the guns on 21 January. During the bombardment of the fort, Vineta fired a total of twenty 21 cm and eighty-six 15 cm shells, setting it afire and damaging the fortress. The Venezuelan gunners had already evacuated and suffered no casualties. The United States, which viewed itself as the protector of South America under the Monroe Doctrine, had initially ignored the European intervention but took an increasingly hostile view toward the Europeans as they became more aggressive, particularly after the attack on Fort San Carlos. The Europeans nevertheless requested the United States to arbitrate a settlement, which resulted in an agreement that Venezuela would receive all of the naval and civilian vessels that had been seized in return for resuming debt payments.

==== Subsequent activity ====
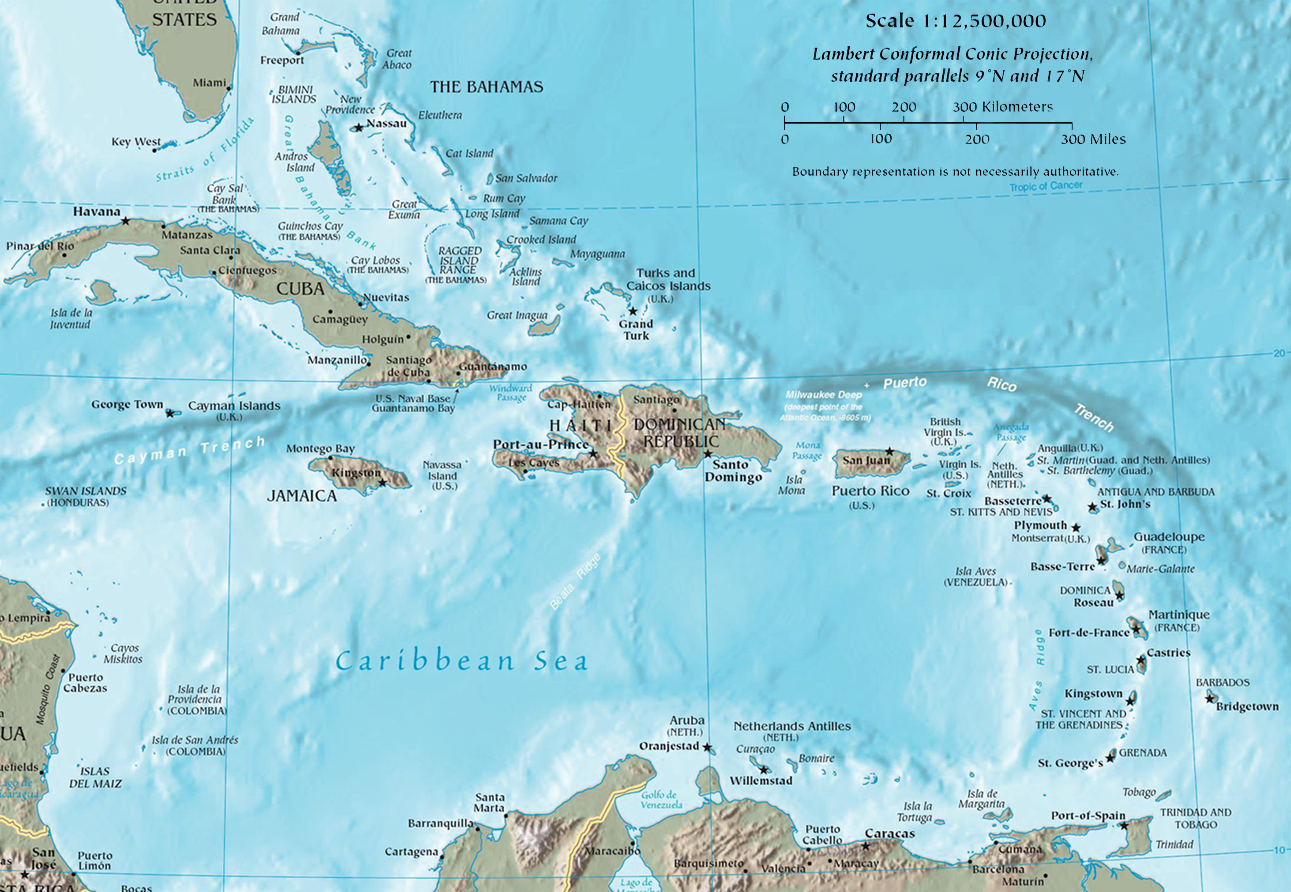
Map of the Caribbean showing many of the ports Vineta visited during her deployment

The East American Cruiser Division remained in existence after the conclusion of operations against Venezuela. Vineta embarked on a tour of ports in the West Indies, including Santo Domingo, Haiti, where civil unrest had broken out. At some point during this period, one of Vineta's 15 cm ammunition magazines exploded, but did not cause major damage to the ship. The accident had significant long-term consequences, however, as it exposed the volatility of German propellant charges. The Germans therefore reworked the composition of the propellant, which was in service by 1914. This new, more stable propellant saved several German battlecruisers from destruction when their magazines were penetrated by British shells during World War I. She then steamed north to Halifax, Canada, for another overhaul that lasted from 27 June to 2 September. The other vessels of the division also dispersed to other ports for repairs, before rendezvousing in Saint Thomas in October. While Vineta lay there on 15 November, KzS Ludwig von Schröder arrived to replace Scheder as the commander of both the vessel and the division.

Vineta cruised with the rest of the division through the West Indies in December 1903 and January 1904; this included a stop in New Orleans with the rest of the division in January. Vineta then visited Veracruz from 4 to 13 February before returning to various ports in the West Indies. She made another visit to New Orleans from 20 May to 11 July, during which time the ship was visited by President Theodore Roosevelt. Vineta next steamed to Charlotte Amalie, the capital of Saint Thomas. At that time, the island belonged to Denmark, but due to the country's weak economy, the Danish government was interested in selling Saint Thomas. Germany considered acquiring the island as a coaling station, but negotiations ultimately came to nothing.

Vineta departed for a tour of the eastern coast of South America, stopping in several Brazilian ports before reaching Rio de Janeiro by October. While there on the 5th, Vineta received orders to cross the Atlantic to German South West Africa, which was then embroiled in a Herero rebellion against German colonial rule. The situation in the region was tense, as the neighboring Portuguese colony of Angola was delivering arms to the Herero rebels, and at the same time, the Russian Second Pacific Squadron had stopped to coal at Lüderitz Bay in German South West Africa, en route to its ultimate destruction at the Battle of Tsushima of the Russo-Japanese War. Vineta was not directly involved in any action in the colony, instead only assisting the steamer SS Gertrud Woermann in unloading soldiers, horses, and supplies, which had arrived on the night of 19–20 November. While she was in the area, Vineta was shadowed by the British cruiser HMS Barrosa and the Portuguese gunboat Cacongo. Vineta steamed north to Duala in the German colony of Kamerun in January 1905, where she received orders to return home. She arrived in Wilhelmshaven on 14 March, and the East American Cruiser Division was disbanded the following day.

=== Later career ===
Vineta was then assigned to the Torpedo Inspectorate on 30 March and was moved to Kiel, where she entered the Kaiserliche Werft there for conversion into a torpedo test ship. While the work was being carried out, the ship's crew was reduced. On 3 January 1906, she returned to service with the Torpedo Testing Command, along with the light cruiser München. The latter was initially the flagship of the unit, but Vineta replaced her in that role on 3 March. In June, Korvettenkapitän (KK—Corvette Captain) Eberhard von Mantey took command of the ship, though he served in the position for just a month before being replaced by KzS Schäfer. He was in turn relieved by Fregattenkapitän (FK—Frigate Captain) Friedrich Schultz in October. In 1907, the ship was used to test wireless telegraphy equipment from 21 March to 5 April. After completing the tests, she joined the ships of the Training and Testing Unit for a cruise to visit Vigo, Spain, that lasted from 15 April to 4 May. Vineta trained with the main fleet during its annual maneuvers, held from 25 August to 7 September; she served with the fleet's reconnaissance screen for the exercises. Vineta cruised with the Training and Testing Unit from 30 March to 25 April 1908. She then went into dry-dock for periodic maintenance from 6 July to 5 September, by which time the new armored cruiser Friedrich Carl had replaced her in the Torpedo Testing Command. Vineta was accordingly decommissioned in Danzig.

The naval command then made the decision to convert Vineta into a training ship for naval cadets and apprentice seamen. She went to dry dock at the Kaiserliche Werft in Danzig for an extensive refit. The ship was re-boilered with Marine-type water-tube boilers. Vineta originally had three funnels, and during the modernization they were reduced to two. The refit was finished by early 1911, and Vineta was recommissioned for the third time on 29 March, under the command of KzS Karl Sievers. She embarked a contingent of naval cadets for a cruise to Norway that lasted from 7 June to 25 July, followed by a longer cruise back to the West Indies that began on 4 August and concluded with her return to Germany on 9 March 1912. After exchanging her cadets for another cohort for the 1912–1913 training year, she made a short cruise in July to visit Stockholm, Sweden, and Libau, Russia.

That year's long-distance cruise went to the Mediterranean Sea that year, and began on 6 August 1912. The ship cruised in the western Mediterranean later that year, along with her sister Hertha. The old cruiser Geier was also in the region. As the Bulgarian army was poised to march on Constantinople during the First Balkan War, the Great Powers deployed a naval force to ensure the safety of foreign nationals in the Ottoman Empire. Vineta and the battlecruiser Goeben were sent to Constantinople as part of this force, Goeben arriving there on 15 November and Vineta joining her on 9 December. At that time, the Germans created the Mediterranean Division, which included both ships. The international fleet sent ashore a force of around 3,000 officers and men. The force was withdrawn to Crete after a ceasefire seemed imminent, but by February 1913 fighting again broke out, and the island was seized by Greece. In the meantime, Vineta had gone to Alexandria, Egypt, on 2 January, where she began the voyage back to Germany, arriving in Kiel on 5 March. FK Wilhelm Adelung relieved Sievers; he served as the ship's final captain. She took another group of cadets on a voyage in the Baltic Sea shortly thereafter.

On 11 August, Vineta began her last overseas cruise, again to South American and West Indian waters. Another period of domestic unrest had broken out in Haiti in January 1914, leading Vineta to steam to Port-au-Prince to protect German nationals in the city. There, she met the US dreadnought battleship USS South Carolina and the armored cruiser USS Montana. All three ships sent landing parties ashore to protect their respective nationals. At that time, the Haitian president, Michel Oreste abdicated, and he and his family came aboard Vineta to be carried into exile. She later transferred Oreste and his family to the steamer SS Prinz Eitel Friedrich, which took them to Colombia, where they went into exile. Vineta returned to Kiel on 16 March. She went on a tour of Swedish ports, including Stockholm, Visby, and Gothenburg, along with Glücksburg, Germany, over the summer of 1914, shortly before the outbreak of World War I. She arrived back at Wilhelmshaven on 25 July, days before the start of hostilities.

Vineta had a short career during World War I. At the outbreak of hostilities on 28 July, she was in the Kaiserliche Werft in Wilhelmshaven, undergoing periodic maintenance. She was briefly mobilized into V Scouting Group, and from 27 August, was stationed in the western Baltic on patrol duty. She participated in a sweep eastward as far as Bornholm, but encountered no enemy vessels. Another sortie followed on 20 October, which advanced as far as Lyserort, Russia, but again, met no resistance from the Russian Baltic Fleet. By November 1914, the naval command decided to withdraw the ships from service, owing to their weak armor protection. Vineta was decommissioned on 16 November. Initially left unused in Kiel, she was disarmed and was reduced to a barracks ship for U-boat crews. She served in that capacity through the end of the war in November 1918. She was stricken from the naval register on 6 December 1919 and sold to ship breakers in Harburg. She was scrapped the following year.

== See also ==
- Vineta provisional, a famous stamp issued on SMS Vineta in 1901.
