= Richard Eckermann =

- Born: 15 July 1862; Ratzeburg, Duchy of Lauenburg
- Died: 13 January 1916 (aged 53); Kiel, German Empire
- Military career
- Allegiance: German Empire
- Branch: Imperial German Navy
- Service years: 1881-1916
- Rank: Vizeadmiral (Vice Admiral)
- Commands: SMS Schwaben; SMS Braunschweig; SMS Brandenburg; SMS Panther
- Conflicts: World War I

Heinrich Paul Christian Richard Eckermann (15 July 1862, near Ratzeburg - 13 January 1916, Kiel) was an officer of the German Imperial Navy, rising to Vizeadmiral (Vice Admiral) in the First World War.

== Life ==
Eckermann was the fourth child of the justice-councillor Rudolf Eckermann (1824–1904) and his wife Marie (1840–1873). He was born in Ratzeburg, but in 1864 his parents moved to Flensburg then in 1867 to the naval town of Kiel. From 1869 to 1881 he attended the Kieler Gelehrtenschule, moving to the Abitur in 1881 and finally enrolling as a naval cadet on 12 April 1881.

His first postings were to SMS Niobe, SMS Mars and SMS Friedrich der Grosse as well as to the Marineschule in Kiel. After being made a Seekadett (midshipman), he was posted to SMS Leipzig, remaining with it for two years on its posting to the Far East. After returning home from that trip, he was promoted to Unterleutnant zur See in November 1884 and posted to the officer-training course at the Marineschule.

A series of short postings to training ships followed, taking him to the West Indies and the Mediterranean as well as the North Atlantic. He then travelled to North and South America and the West Indies for 18 months on board SMS Ariadne. He was then sent on a longer posting to the Marinedetachement and the Artillerieprüfungskommission in Berlin. During this time he was temporarily in command of the torpedo boat V 6, travelling between Berlin and Potsdam on the rivers Elbe, Havel and Spree and remaining on standby to transport the Kaiser. In this position he fired a torpedo on the Havelsee in front of the imperial family and received his first decoration, the fourth class of the Order of the Crown, presented personally by the Crown Prince.

His Berlin posting was followed by a series of shorter postings to training ships in the Matrosendivision and in the Torpedoabteilung in Wilhelmshaven, as First Officer on the SMS Bremse, the fishery protection on the North Sea and as commander of torpedo boats at various training and active divisions. In April 1894 Eckermann was promoted to Kapitänleutnant and travelled to South America on the steamer München to join SMS Arcona as its navigation officer. This posting lasted eighteen months in South America and the Far East, during which he later moved to SMS Marie.

After returning home, Eckermann was made Kompanieführer in the III. Marine-Artillerie-Abteilung in Lehe bei Bremerhaven. In 1897 he married Marie Luise Stadtlander, daughter of the Prussian vice-consul, ship-owner and ship-broker Johann Stadtlander and his wife Rebecca - Eckermann and his wife had two children. In the years which followed he was ordered to join the Reichsmarineamt in Berlin and served as First Officer of the SMS Ägir. From March 1902 to June 1903 he commanded the gunboat SMS Panther - his first trip with this ship was up the Rhine to Düsseldorf for the World Exhibition there. He and the ship then sailed to the West Indies and South America, where the ship sank the Haitian gunboat Crête-à-Pierrot (which had hijacked the German steamer Markomannia). Joined the naval blockade of Venezuela and carried out a lengthy bombardment of the Venezuelan Fort San Carlos in 1903. The battle started when the fort's gunners opened fire on Panther when she was crossing the sandy bar of Maracaibo lagoon. The captain Eckermann replied the fire but the shallow waters prevented Panther from making an effective bombardment. Inside the fort, two of the gunners managed to score several hits at Panther with their 80-millimeter Krupp gun, causing considerable damage to the ship. After half an hour of exchanging fire, the Panther retreated. The president Cipriano Castro claimed this as a victory, and in response the German commander sent the protected cruiser Vineta with heavier weapons to destroy the fort. From 1903 to 1906 he was back at the Reichsmarineamt in Berlin. He next commanded SMS Brandenburg, SMS Braunschweig (1907–08) and SMS Schwaben (1908–10). In autumn 1910 he became Oberwerftdirektor of Kaiserliche Werft Wilhelmshaven, holding that position until March 1914. From March to August 1914 he was inspector of the torpedo force at Kiel.

Shortly after the start of World War I, from 12 to 31 August 1914, he was commander of the 6th Squadron. On 13 October 1914 he was promoted to vice admiral. A special friend of Alfred von Tirpitz, Eckermann was an unconditional supporter of offensive warfare and unrestricted submarine warfare and disliked the restraint imposed on the German Navy early in the war. He tirelessly worked to change this - its first offensive operations, the bombardment of the English coast, were on his initiative. From 12 September 1914 to 3 February 1915 he was chief of staff to the High Seas Fleet and from 16 February to 19 June 1915 commander of the I Battle Squadron. He then fell seriously ill and retired on 10 July 1915. He died on 13 January 1916 in Kiel, one day after receiving the Iron Cross first class.

== Sources ==
- (in German) Militärischer Personalbogen des Vizeadmiral Richard Eckermann (1862–1916)
- (in German) Tagebücher R. Eckermann im Familiennachlass
- (in German) Hildebrand, Hans H. / Henriot, Ernest - Deutschlands Admirale 1849–1945. Die militärischen Werdegänge der See-, Ingenieur-, Sanitäts-, Waffen- und Verwaltingsoffiziere im Admiralsrang. Band 3, Biblio-Verlag Osnabrück, 1988
