= Hammerton Killick =

Haitian admiral (1856–1902)

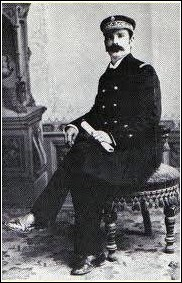
- Admiral Killick
- Born: April 18, 1856
- Died: September 6, 1902 (aged 46); Gonaïves
- Military career
- Allegiance: Haiti
- Branch: Haitian Navy
- Rank: Admiral
- Nickname: Admiral Hammerton Killick

Hammerton Killick (April 18, 1856 – September 6, 1902) was an admiral in the Haitian Navy. He was killed in the 1902 Firmin rebellion when he refused to surrender his ship to the German warship SMS Panther. A naval base in Port-au-Prince is named after him. A 1943 Haitian postage stamp commemorated his role in the rebellion.

== Early life ==
Killick was an Anglo-Haitian mulatto. His father was of either Scottish or Irish descent.

== Military service ==
Haiti in Killick's time was a poor country, and its navy was ill-equipped, with many of its officers serving under contract from other nations. At any given time, the number of ships in the Navy ranged between two and four. An observer in 1899 described obsolete, possibly un-seaworthy ships badly in need of paint being cannibalized for parts. Sailors in the navy often had to go without pay, and often had little, poor quality food. Moreover, the political situation in Haiti was not stable, with President Florvil Hyppolite facing revolts and rebellions, and the scorn of the international community.

As the Admiral of this poorly equipped, underfunded force a significant amount of Killick's resources went to trying to acquire more ships. In January 1894 an American yacht called the Natalie sailed out of Savannah, went missing and was presumed lost. There were rumors that the Natalie was carrying arms and ammunition to be used in a plot to overthrow Hyppolite, but her captain denied that there were any weapons on board, and claimed the trip was just a pleasure cruise. The Natalie was spotted near Long Cay, Bahamas in February. A short time later two Haitian vessels, the Defence and the Dessalines, with Killick on board, showed up near the Natalie. The Defence was carrying $25,000 in American gold to purchase the Natalie, and the Dessalines was carrying $60,000 in gold coin for the purchase of the Natalie. Killick and the Natalie's captain negotiated a purchase of the Natalie for £5,208 6s 8d, roughly $25,000. The Natalie was retrofitted in Savannah and added to the Haitian Navy.

In 1896 Haiti was able to add a brand new ship to its fleet, the Crête-à-Pierrot. The Crête-à-Pierrot was commissioned to be the flagship of the navy. It was built in England and armed in France. It had 11 guns, could steam 15 knots, and displaced 940 tonnes of water. In 1899 the captain commented about how often the Admiral came aboard.

In July 1898, Admiral Killick caused some anxiety in the international community when he went missing for nineteen days.

== Rebellion and death ==
In May 1902, Haitian President Tirésias Simon Sam resigned in embarrassment over Haiti's inability to assert itself in the international community after the Emil Lüders incident. The 1889 constitution provided for the National Assembly to name a president, but there was an uprising demanding direct elections. A provisional government was created to oversee the election of deputies who, together with the National Assembly would appoint the president. Anténor Firmin soon emerged as a popular favorite, but he was opposed by the military and the provisional government, which both supported Pierre Nord Alexis. By June 1902 a civil war had broken out between the supporters of Firmin and the supporters of Alexis.

Admiral Killick declared his support for Firmin very early on, and his support meant that although Alexis had the support of the military, Firmin had the support of the navy, and full control of the coast. As of 15 May, Killick had not only declared for Firmin, but taken the flagship of the Haitian Navy, the Crête-à-Pierrot, to Cap-Haïtien to pick up Firminist troops and transport them to Port-au-Prince. Meanwhile, the rest of the Haitian Navy, comprising a single ship, the Toussaint Louverture, was in Gonaïves, where Firmin had many supporters.

Firmin campaigned to be elected deputy of both his hometown Cap-Haïtien, and Gonaïves. He was elected deputy for Gonaïves, but on June 28 fighting broke out in Cap-Haïtien between his supporters and troops controlled by Alexis, who had been sent there to supervise the elections. After the fighting broke out Firmin embarked on the Crête-à-Pierrot and sailed to Gonaïves. There he continued to protest against the way the elections were being conducted.

Killick, meanwhile, proceeded to bombard Cap-Haïtien with both ships. When he left Cap-Haïtien he accidentally ran the Toussaint Louverture aground on a reef, but through the rest of the summer Killick and the Crête-à-Pierrot transported soldiers for the Firminist cause, attacked coastal towns, and isolated and slowly demobilized Alexis' forces. Meanwhile, Jean Jumeau marched on Port-au-Prince by land.

Due to his role in the conflict between Firmin and Alexis, Killick was decommissioned by July 12.

Although the disrupted, disputed elections were still on-going in July, by July 26, Firmin had been declared president by inhabitants of Artibonite and several other regions of Haiti, Jumeau's land forces were reported to be within one day's march of Port-au-Prince, and the Crête-à-Pierrot was in the harbor at Port-au-Prince.

Eventually, Killick attempted to establish a blockade of the harbor at Cap-Haïtien. On September 2, 1902, Killick and his crew seized a German ammunition ship, the Markomannia en route to Cape Haitian to provide ammunition to Alexis' forces. Alexis asked Germany for help subduing a pirate ship. In response, Germany sent the gunboat SMS Panther to find and capture the Crête-à-Pierrot.

On September 6, the Crête-à-Pierrot was in port at Gonaïves, with Killick and most of the crew on shore leave when the Panther appeared. Killick rushed on-board and ordered his crew to abandon ship. When all but four crew members had evacuated the ship Killick, inspired by the tale of Captain LaPorte, wrapped himself in a Haitian flag, fired the aft magazine, and blew up the ship, along with the arms that were supplied by German merchants, rather than let the Germans take her. Killick and the remaining four crew members went down with the ship.

An hour later, the Panther fired thirty shots at the Crête-à-Pierrot to finish it off, then sailed away. The ship's rifles and machine guns were salvaged. Killick's body was recovered and buried that same day.

Killick's sacrifice was seen as the ultimate act of patriotism, yet Firmin's struggling revolution was doomed to failure by the loss of the Crête-à-Pierrot and the support of Haiti's navy. Within a month, Firmin went into exile in Saint Thomas, Danish West Indies, where he died in 1911.

== Gallery ==
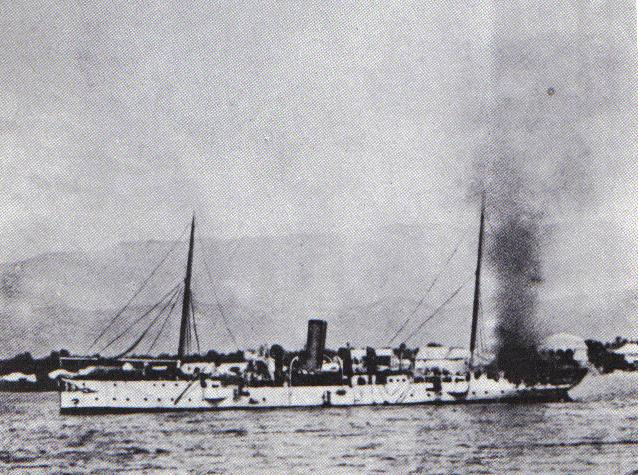
Killick's ship, the Crête-à-Pierrot.

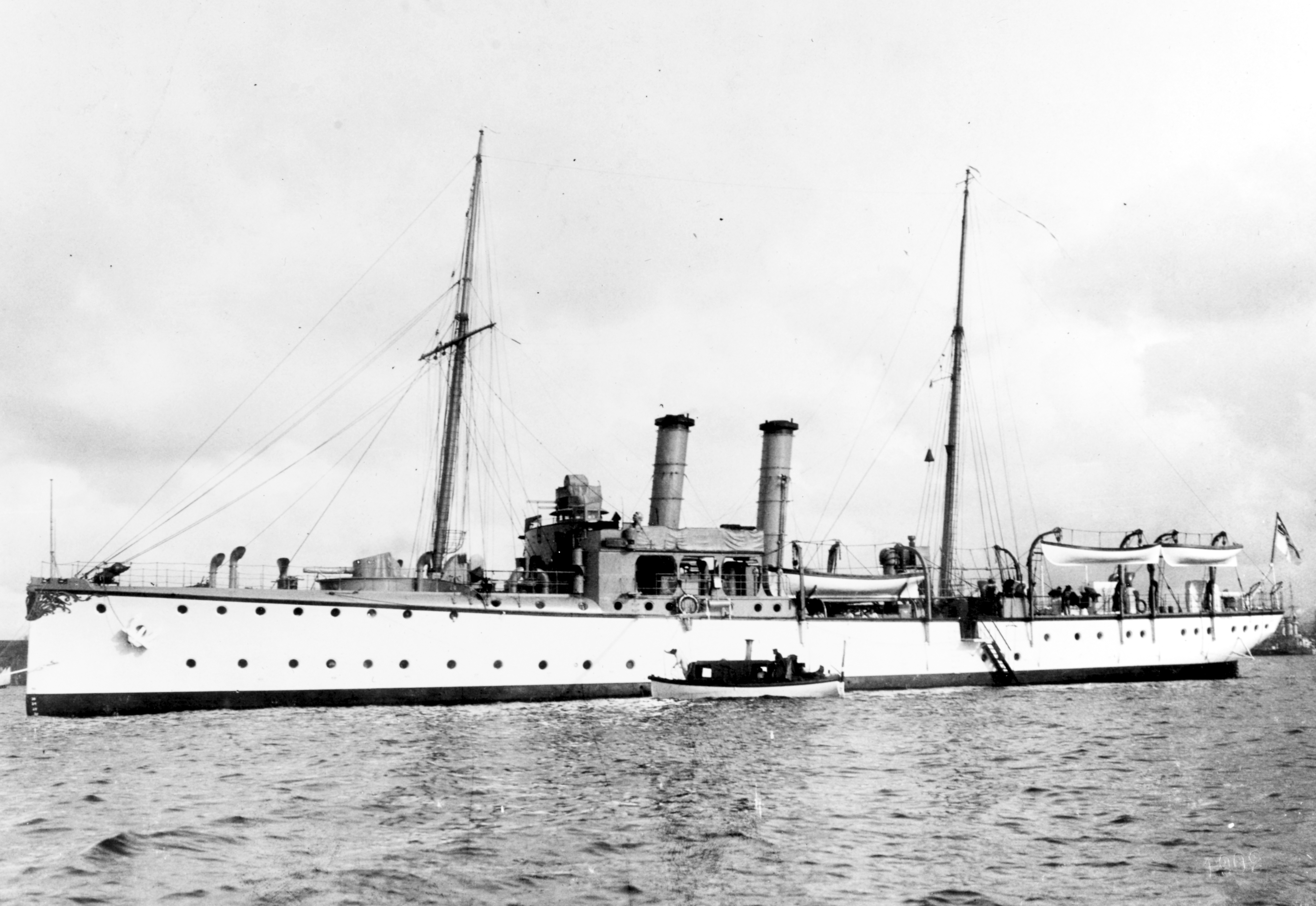
SMS Panther, a German ship sent to capture the Crête-à-Pierrot.

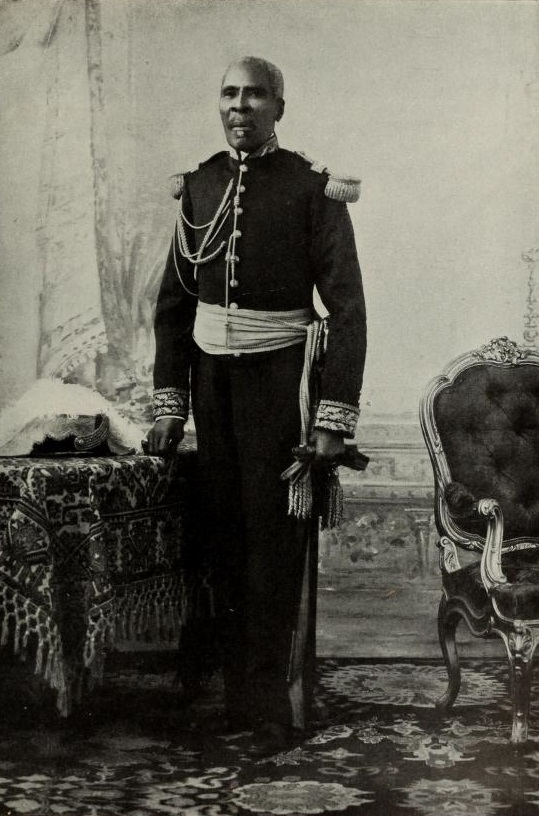
Pierre Nord Alexis, the 19th President of Haiti.

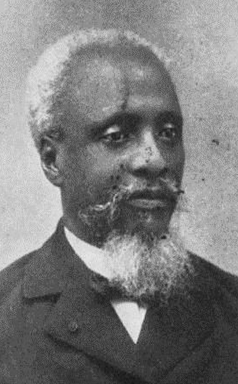
Anténor Firmin. Killick died supporting Firmin instead of Alexis in the civil war over who would become the 19th President of Haiti.

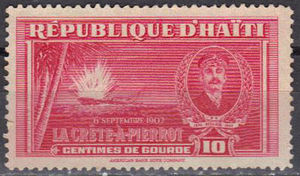
In 1943 Killick was honored with a postage stamp depicting his death.

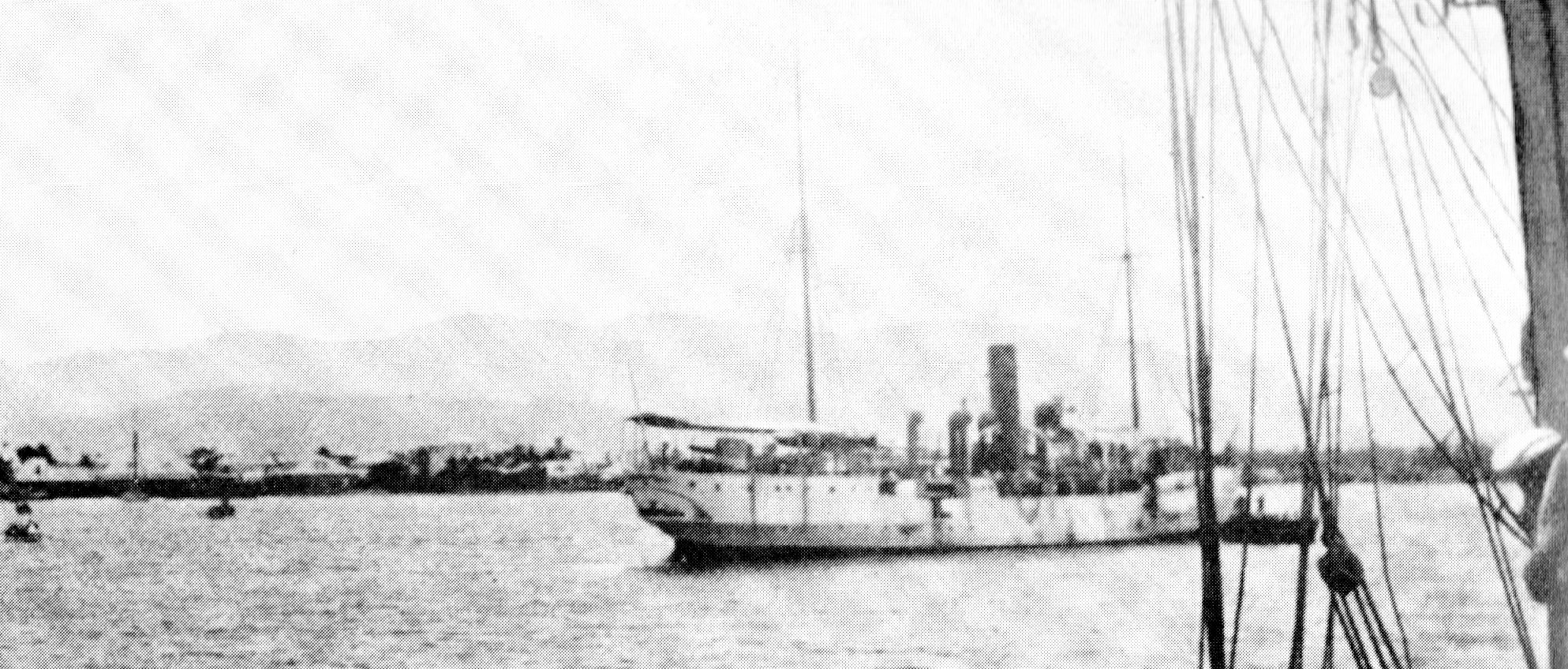
Haitian gunboat Crête-à-Pierrot on September 6, 1902, at the Port of Gonaives shortly before the sinking by SMS Panther.

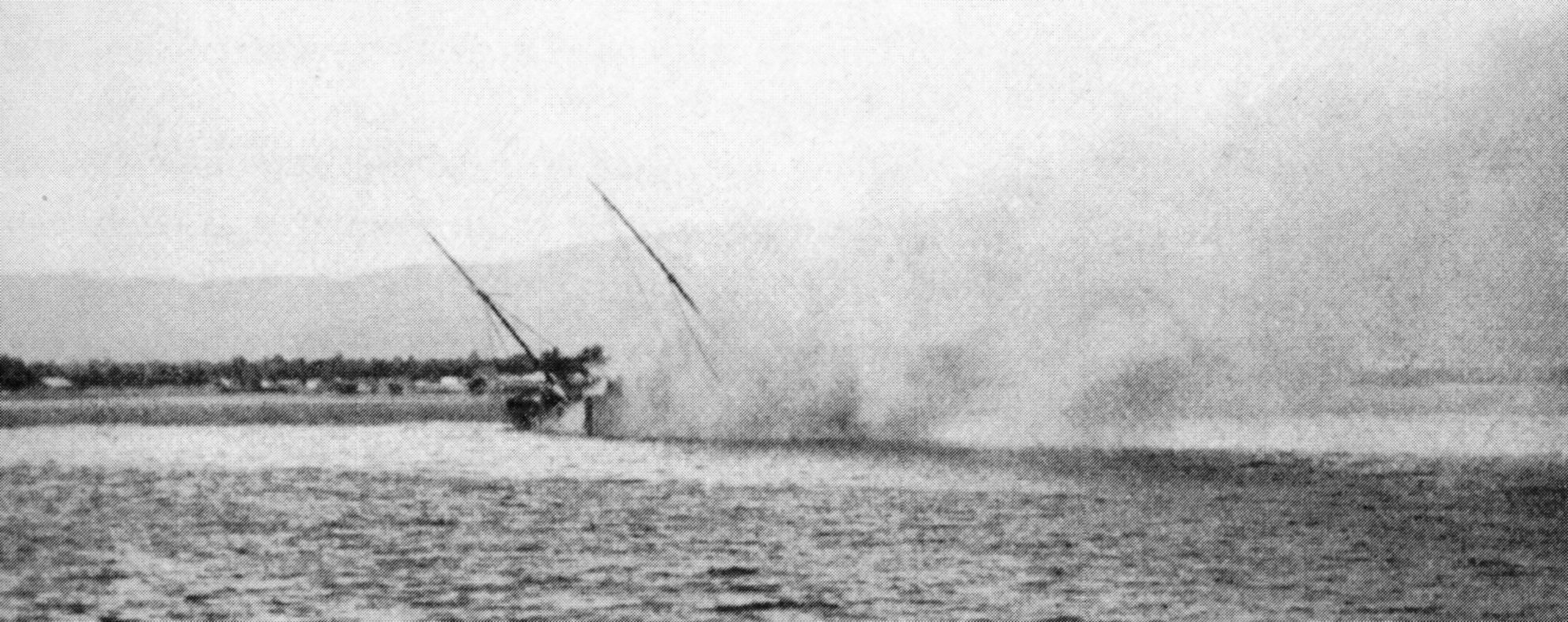
The Haitian gunboat Crete-à-Pierrot sinking after bombardment by SMS Panther in the port of Gonaives September 6, 1902.

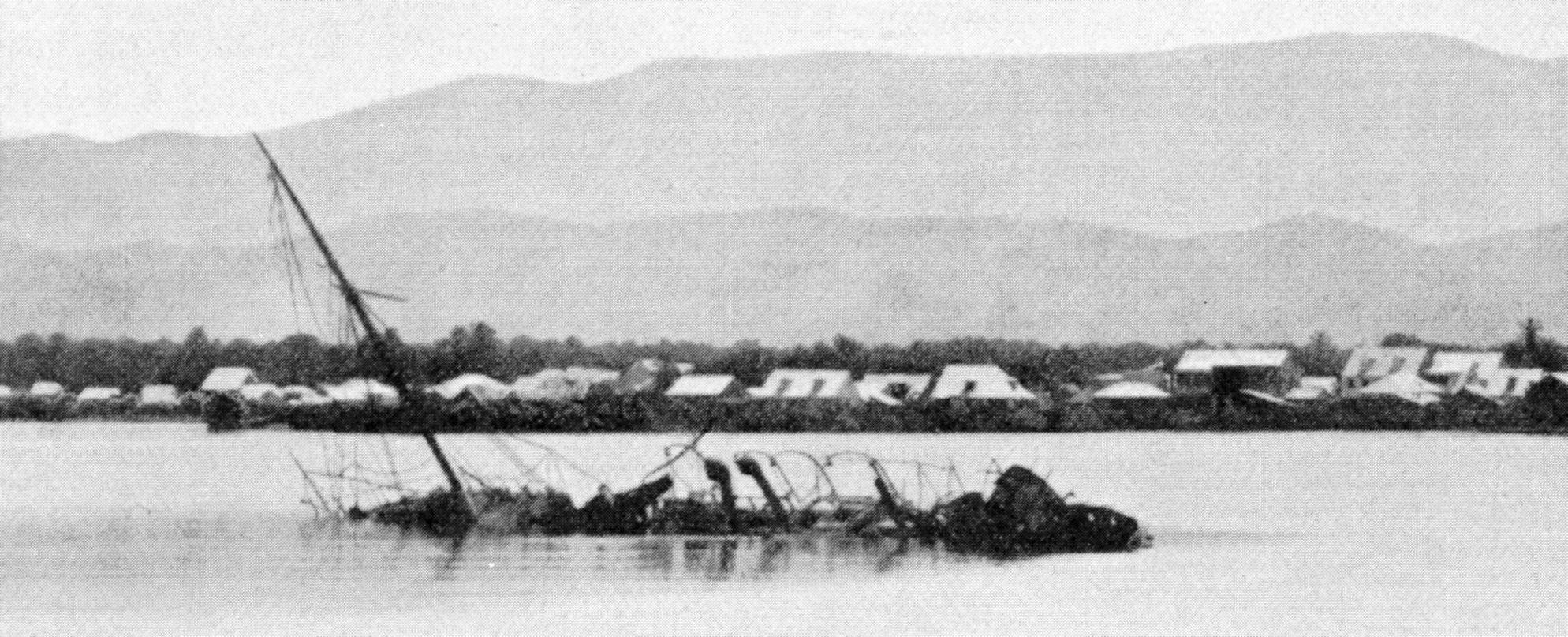
Wreck of the Haitian gunboat Crete-à-Pierrot in the port of Gonaives on September 6, 1902.
