= Haitian gunboat La Liberté =

Haitian gunboat destroyed after the explosion in 1911

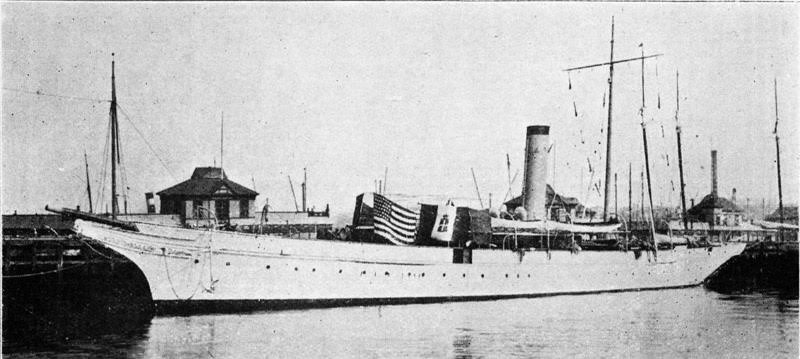
- La Liberté, possibly as Earl King before its acquisition by the Haitian government

History

United States
- Name: Earl King
- Laid down: 1909
- Launched: 1910
- Decommissioned: 1910
- Fate: Acquired by Haitian Navy in same year.

Haiti
- Name: La Liberté
- Namesake: Liberty
- Acquired: 1910
- Decommissioned: 1911
- Home port: Port-au-Prince
- Fate: Destroyed by explosion

General characteristics
- Type: Cargo ship; Gunboat
- Displacement: 500 t
- Length: 196 ft (60 m)
- Beam: 26 ft (7.9 m)
- Draft: 13 ft (4.0 m)
- Propulsion: steam engine, single screw
- Speed: 12 knots (22 km/h; 14 mph)
- Armament: 2 x 1 - 57/40 Hotchkiss; 2 x 1 - 47/40 Hotchkiss; 2 x 1 - 37/20 Hotchkiss

La Liberté (trans: Liberty) was a gunboat of the Haitian Navy, which was in service from its acquisition in 1910 until 1911, when it suffered an explosion.

== Service history ==
The vessel was originally launched as a cargo ship under the name of SS Earl King which was modified into a gunboat in 1911 during the Revolution in Haiti. La Liberté, while in the port of Port-au-Prince, suffered an explosion from which only 23 crew members survived. The ship was declared a total loss.
