= SMS Eber (1903) =

German Imperial Navy warship

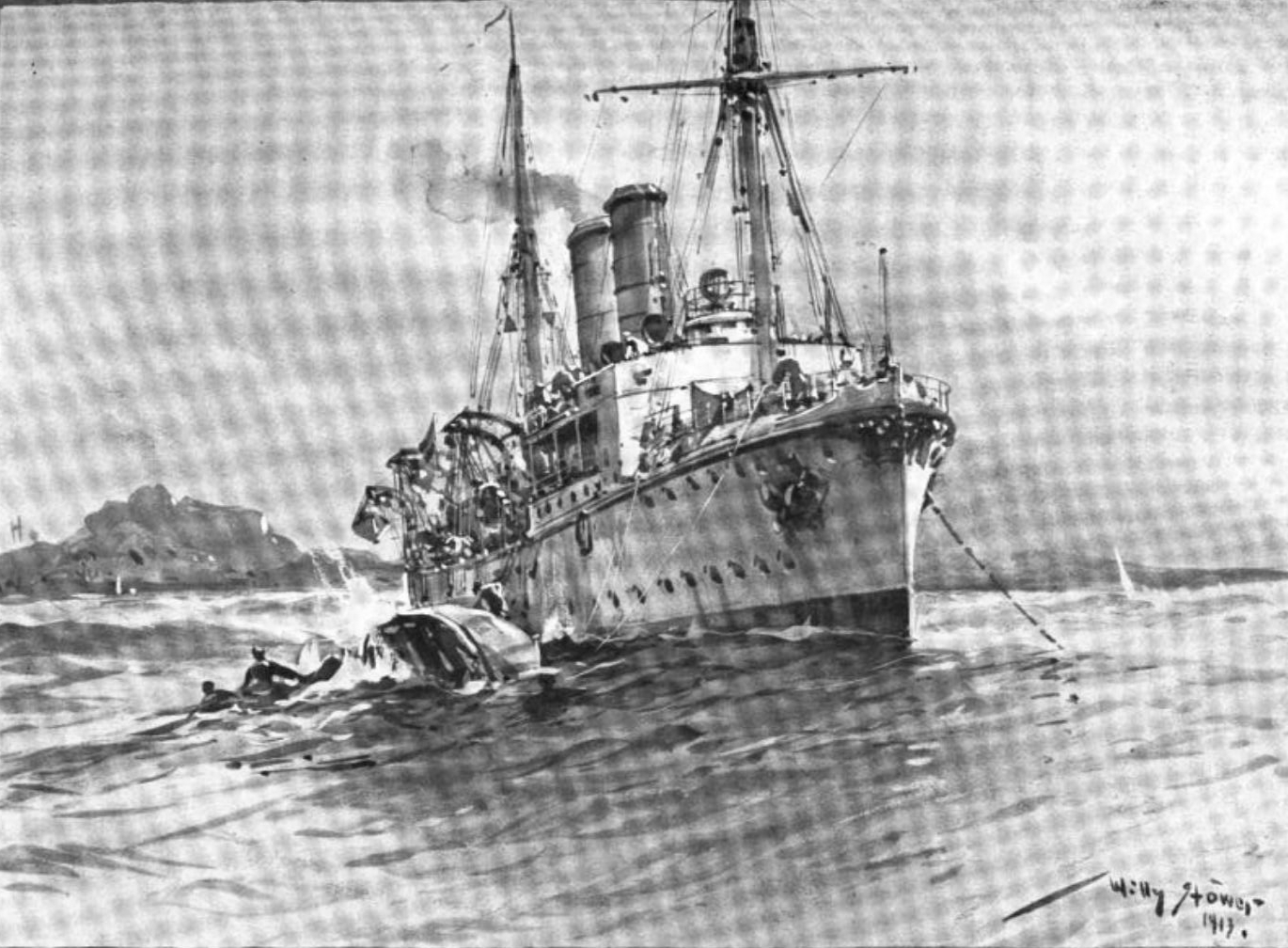
- Eber, by Willy Stöwer

History

German Empire
- Name: Eber
- Namesake: SMS Eber
- Builder: AG Vulcan Stettin
- Laid down: 1902
- Launched: 6 June 1903
- Commissioned: 15 September 1903
- Decommissioned: 31 August 1914
- Fate: Scuttled, 26 October 1917

General characteristics
- Class & type: Iltis-class gunboat
- Displacement: Designed: 977 t (962 long tons); Full load: 1,193 t (1,174 long tons)
- Length: 66.9 m (219 ft 6 in) o/a
- Beam: 9.7 m (31 ft 10 in)
- Draft: 3.54 m (11 ft 7 in)
- Installed power: 4 × Thornycroft boilers; 1,300 PS (1,300 ihp)
- Propulsion: 2 × triple-expansion steam engines; 2 × screw propellers
- Speed: 13.5 knots (25.0 km/h; 15.5 mph)
- Complement: 9 officers; 121 enlisted men
- Armament: 2 × 10.5 cm (4.1 in) SK L/40 guns; 6 × 37 mm (1.5 in) Maxim guns
- Armor: Conning tower: 8 mm (0.31 in)

SMS Eber was the last of the six gunboats of the Iltis class built for the German Kaiserliche Marine (Imperial Navy) in the late 1890s and early 1900s. The ships were built to modernize the German gunboat force that was used to patrol the German colonial empire. They were ordered in three groups of two ships, each pair incorporating design improvements. Eber, along with Panther, was armed with a main battery of two 10.5 cm (4.1 in) guns, had a top speed of 13.5 knots (25.0 km/h; 15.5 mph), and could cruise for 3,400 nautical miles (6,300 km; 3,910 mi).

Eber was completed in 1903, but spent the next seven years in reserve. She was activated for her first overseas deployment in 1910, to be sent to patrol the colonies in German West Africa. The next four years passed largely uneventfully for Eber, though in 1911, she participated in the Agadir Crisis in Morocco. After the start of World War I in July 1914, Eber left Africa to find a German ocean liner suitable for use as an auxiliary cruiser; she met Cap Trafalgar in late August, and she transferred both of her 10.5 cm guns to Cap Trafalgar, along with most of her crew. Eber thereafter sailed for then-neutral Brazil, where she remained until the Brazilian government entered the war on the side of the Triple Entente. To prevent her capture, the ship's remaining crew scuttled the ship on 26 October.

== Design ==
Plan and profile of the Iltis class

The German Kaiserliche Marine (Imperial Navy) abandoned gunboat construction for more a decade after Eber, launched in 1887, instead focusing on larger unprotected cruisers beginning with the Schwalbe class. By the mid-1890s, the navy began planning replacements for the older vessels of the Wolf and Habicht classes. The new ships were scheduled to begin construction by 1900, but the loss of the gunboat Iltis in a storm necessitated an immediate replacement, which was added to the 1898 naval budget. The new ship was planned to patrol the German colonial empire; requirements included engines powerful enough for the ship to steam up the Yangtze in China, where the new gunboat was intended to be deployed. Six ships were built in three identical pairs; each pair incorporated incremental improvements over the preceding set, and Eber was one of the last pair, along with Panther.

Eber was 66.9 meters (219 ft 6 in) long overall and had a beam of 9.7 m (31 ft 10 in) and a draft of 3.54 m (11 ft 7 in) forward. She displaced 977 metric tons (962 long tons) as designed and 1,193 t (1,174 long tons) at full load. The ship had a raised forecastle deck and a straight stem. Her superstructure consisted primarily of a conning tower with an open bridge atop it. She had a crew of 9 officers and 121 enlisted men.

Eber's propulsion system consisted of a pair of horizontal triple-expansion steam engines each driving a single screw propeller, with steam supplied by four coal-fired Thornycroft boilers. Exhaust was vented through two funnels located amidships. Eber could steam at a top speed of 13.5 knots (25.0 km/h; 15.5 mph) at 1,300 metric horsepower (1,300 ihp). The ship had a cruising radius of about 3,400 nautical miles (6,300 km; 3,900 mi) at a speed of 9 knots (17 km/h; 10 mph).

Eber was armed with a main battery of two 10.5 cm (4.1 in) SK L/40 guns, with 482 rounds of ammunition. One was placed on the forecastle and the other at the stern. She also carried six 37 mm (1.5 in) Maxim guns. The only armor protection carried by the ship was 8 mm (0.31 in) of steel plate on the conning tower.

== Service history ==
The keel for Eber was laid down at the AG Vulcan in Stettin in 1902, much later than her five sister ships; the ship was initially designated with the provisional name "B". (Note: German warships were ordered under provisional names. Additions to the fleet were given a single letter; ships intended to replace older or lost vessels were ordered as "Ersatz (name of the ship to be replaced)".) She was launched on 6 June 1903 and commissioned into the German fleet on 15 September that year to begin sea trials. Following the completion of her initial testing, Eber remained out of service for the next seven years. The lengthy period in the reserve for a brand new vessel prompted an official inquiry from the Reichstag (Imperial Diet). The Reichsmarineamt (Imperial Navy Office) reported that Eber had been intended to serve as a reserve vessel that could be activated to respond to a crisis or to replace a damaged or lost vessel; this response generated laughter during the Reichstag session when the navy's representative read it.

Eber was activated for her first period of active service in early 1910, to join her sister ship Panther on the western coast of Africa. She departed Wilhelmshaven, Germany, on 14 April and arrived in Douala, the capital of the German colony of Kamerun, on 14 July. The ship's activity during the deployment was characterized by routine visits to ports along the western coast of Africa to show the flag. The tropical climate was difficult for the crews, which were replaced every year, unlike the two-year term for crews assigned to other foreign stations. Eber also routinely visited the Canary Islands and Cape Town to give the crew respites from the tropical heat; during periods in Cape Town, repair work was typically done as well. In early 1911, Eber sailed to Cádiz, Spain, where her annual overhaul was carried out from 7 January to 6 March. On the way back to west Africa, the ship stopped to visit Casablanca in Morocco. Eber thereafter arrived in Douala in May, but in late June she was sent back to the Moroccan coast in response to the Agadir Crisis. She was to replace Panther, which had stopped there only temporarily on her way back to Germany. Eber anchored in the Agadir roadstead with the light cruiser Berlin through November, by which time the crisis had been resolved. During this period, she left only briefly to replenish coal and supplies at Las Palmas or Santa Cruz in the Canaries. After Eber and Berlin were ordered to leave Morocco, the two ships had to seek shelter at Tanger and Casablanca to avoid severe storms.

By late January 1912, Eber had arrived back in Douala. In mid-March, she cruised south to visit German Southwest Africa before proceeding further south to Cape Town on 29 March. There, the ship's captain and first officer were disembarked, as they had fallen seriously ill and had to be returned home. The senior watch officer temporarily took command while a replacement captain traveled from Germany. In late August and into September, Eber cruised in the Congo River, and later that year, she visited Cabinda in Portuguese Congo and Boma in Belgian Congo. In late November, the outbreak of unrest in Monrovia, Liberia, prompted Eber to go there to protect German interests. She was joined by Panther and the light cruiser Bremen. By early February 1913, Eber had returned to Kamerun, but she was scheduled to be sent south to Cape Town for an overhaul. This order was rescinded, however, after an experiment the previous year with Panther had demonstrated that it was more cost effective to bring a gunboat back to Germany for the overhaul than it was to pay a foreign shipyard to do the work. Eber accordingly left Kamerun for Germany at the end of February, and the overhaul was carried out in Wilhelmshaven in May and June.

Eber departed for Kamerun again on 25 June with a survey team aboard, who were to complete the survey of the Gulf of Guinea, which had been suspended since 1905. In late December 1913, the Detached Division, which included the dreadnought battleships Kaiser and König Albert and the light cruiser Strassburg visited the German West African colonies during their long Atlantic cruise; they remained in the area into January 1914 before proceeding further in their voyage. Eber continued her survey work in the Gulf of Guinea until early July, when she sailed south for another overhaul at Cape Town. The dramatic rise in tensions in Europe between the Central Powers (which included Germany) and the Triple Entente over the Assassination of Archduke Franz Ferdinand that culminated in the July Crisis prompted the German navy to cancel Eber's scheduled overhaul and direct her to return to German colonial territory. She sailed back north on 30 July. The British commander of naval forces in the area, Admiral Herbert King-Hall, had ordered the local authorities to prevent Eber from leaving, but they failed to do so.

=== World War I ===
On 2 August, Eber arrived in Lüderitz in German Southwest Africa, where she was then in the range of the wireless telegraph transmitter in Berlin. There, the ship's commander learned of the mobilization order that had been issued the previous day. According to the orders, Eber was to cross the Atlantic to the eastern coast of South America, where she was to locate a German steamer suitable for use as an auxiliary cruiser, which Eber was to arm with some of her own guns. In company with several German steamships acting as colliers, Eber departed for the coast of Brazil, arriving off the remote Brazilian island of Trindade and Martim Vaz. There, she remained for the next several days; while waiting for a suitable passenger ship, Eber briefly met the light cruiser Dresden on 20 August. Three days later, the liner Cap Trafalgar arrived, and over the coming days, both of Eber's 10.5 cm guns were moved to the ship, along with most of her officers and crew. No longer useful as a warship, Eber was decommissioned on 31 August.

Cap Trafalgar departed on 4 September to begin the commerce raiding campaign, while Eber, having been disarmed, sailed under a commercial flag to try to reach a Brazilian port. Eber reached Salvador, Bahia on 14 September, where she remained for the next three years. Cap Trafalgar's raiding career was brief; the same day that Eber arrived in Salvador, Cap Trafalgar was caught and sunk by the armed merchant cruiser Carmania. In late 1917, Brazil entered the war on the side of the Triple Entente, and to prevent her capture, Eber's remaining crew set the ship on fire on 26 October and then scuttled her by opening her sea valves.
