= Hermann Wilberg =

German mining engineer

- Born: 1880; Dortmund, Germany
- Died: 24 November 1946 (aged 65–66); Lager Staumühle, near Paderborn
- Occupation: German mining engineer

Hermann Wilhelm Wilberg (1880 – 24 November 1946) was a German mining engineer.

Born in 1880 in Dortmund, Germany, the son of a butcher, Wilberg studied mine engineering. From 1899 to 1910 he worked for the Oberbergamt (mining office) in Halle/Saale, Germany. before moving to Mogadir, Morocco as representative for the Hamburg-Marrokko-Gesellschaft.

In summer 1911 he was sent to Agadir on behalf of the German Foreign Office in order to provide the pretext for the German intervention in Morocco resulting in the Agadir crisis. Due to delays in his journey he did not make it in time to be "rescued" by a German gunboat, only arriving in Agadir on 4 July 1911, three days after SMS Panther. This resulted in him being dubbed the "Endangered German" in posterity.

In May 1912 he married Margarete von Maur, daughter of Heinrich von Maur, the Mannesmann representative in Morocco. Returning to Germany later that year, he worked for the Oberbergamt Oberhausen Later Wilberg served on the board of the Sol- und Thermalbad Wilhelmsquelle in Wanne-Eickel and various other administrative positions but mainly for the Berginspektion Goslar. After the end of World War II he was interned in Lager Staumühle (Civil Internment Camp No. 5) near Paderborn by the British military government where he died 24 November 1946, aged 66 years.
