= SMS Panther (1901) =

German gunboat

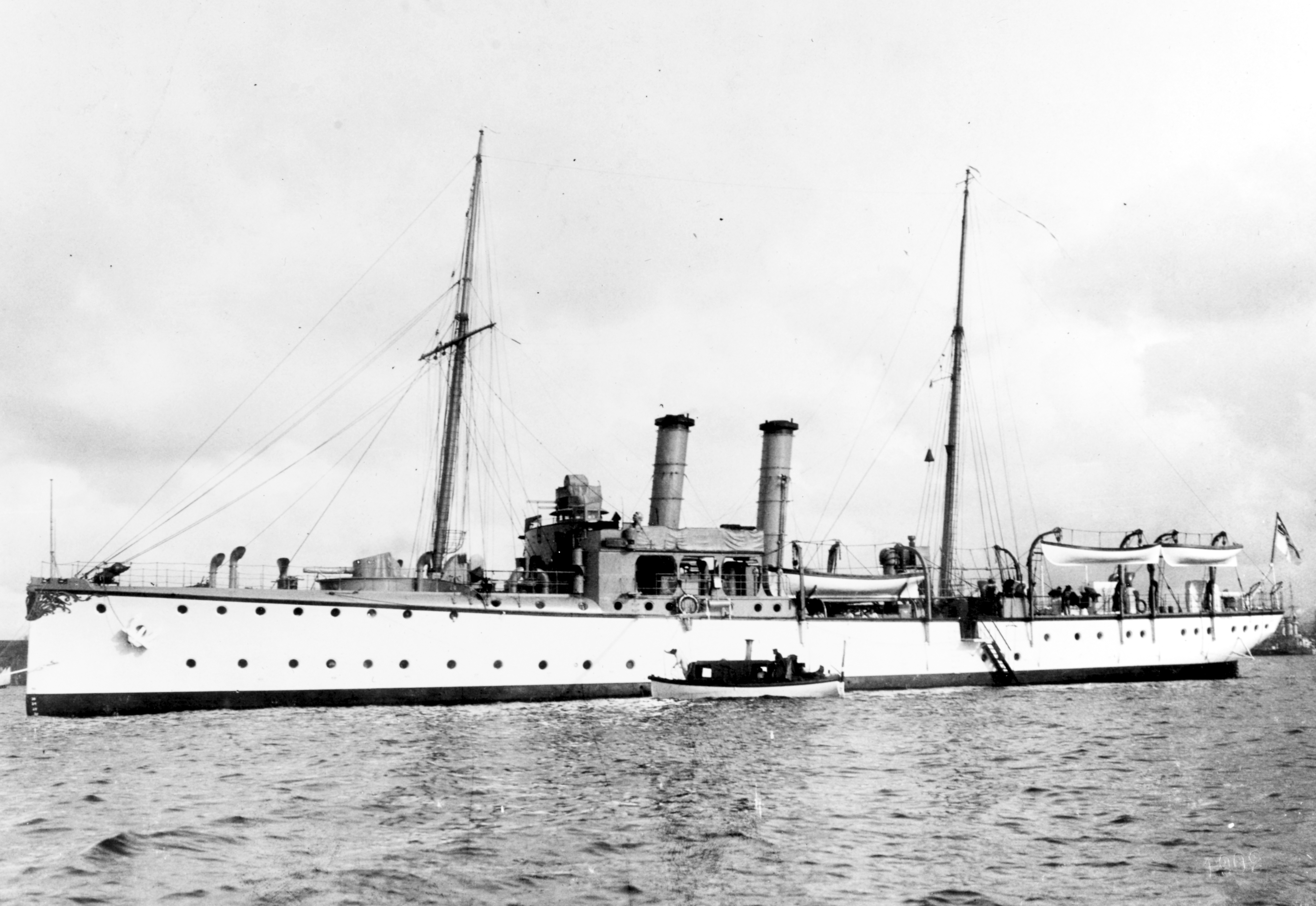
- SMS Panther

History

German Empire
- Name: SMS Panther
- Namesake: Panthera
- Builder: Kaiserliche Werft, Danzig
- Laid down: July 1900
- Launched: 1 April 1901
- Commissioned: 15 March 1902
- Decommissioned: 15 December 1926
- Stricken: 31 March 1931
- Fate: Sold and scrapped 1931

General characteristics
- Class & type: Iltis-class gunboat
- Displacement: Designed: 977 t (962 long tons); Full load: 1,193 t (1,174 long tons)
- Length: 66.9 m (219 ft 6 in) o/a
- Beam: 9.7 m (31 ft 10 in)
- Draft: 3.54 m (11 ft 7 in)
- Installed power: 4 × Thornycroft boilers; 1,300 PS (1,300 ihp)
- Propulsion: 2 × triple-expansion steam engines; 2 × screw propellers
- Speed: 13.5 knots (25.0 km/h; 15.5 mph)
- Range: 3,400 nmi (6,300 km; 3,900 mi) at 9 knots (17 km/h; 10 mph)
- Complement: 9 officers; 121 enlisted men
- Armament: 2 × 10.5 cm (4.1 in) SK L/40 guns; 6 × 37 mm (1.5 in) Maxim guns
- Armor: Conning tower: 8 mm (0.31 in)

SMS Panther was one of six Iltis-class gunboats built for the German Kaiserliche Marine (Imperial Navy) in the late 1890s and early 1900s. The ships were built to modernize the German gunboat force that was used to patrol the German colonial empire. They were ordered in three groups of two ships, each pair incorporating design improvements. Panther, along with Eber, was armed with a main battery of two 10.5 cm (4.1 in) guns, had a top speed of 13.5 knots (25.0 km/h; 15.5 mph), and could cruise for 3,400 nautical miles (6,300 km; 3,910 mi).

Panther spent most of her career abroad, where she was involved in a number of international disputes. She was initially sent to the East American Station after entering service in 1902, and she was soon sent to intervene in the Markomannia incident, where she sank the Haitian gunboat Crête-à-Pierrot. Panther was next involved in the Venezuelan crisis of 1902–1903, during which she participated in the bombardment of Fort San Carlos. Panther returned to Haiti in 1904 to pressure the Haitian government to pay a settlement after an attack on a German diplomat in the country. In 1905 and 1906, the ship toured South America, steaming as far south as Paraguay. She was transferred to German West Africa in mid-1907.

The ship patrolled Germany's West African colonies for the next four years, largely uneventfully. Recalled to Germany for repairs in 1911, she stopped in Agadir, Morocco, at the request of the Foreign Office, touching off the Agadir Crisis, the most significant incident that involved Panther. The resulting international uproar created a war scare that significantly worsened Anglo-German relations. After repairs in Germany, Panther returned to Africa for another tour from 1912 to 1914, arriving back in Germany weeks before the start of World War I. She was used as a patrol vessel in the western Baltic Sea during the war, but she saw no action. After the war, she was retained by the new Reichsmarine (Navy of the Realm) for use as a survey ship. Decommissioned in 1926, she was eventually sold to ship breakers in 1931 and dismantled.

== Design ==
Plan and profile of the Iltis class

The German Kaiserliche Marine (Imperial Navy) abandoned gunboat construction for more a decade after Eber, launched in 1887, instead focusing on larger unprotected cruisers beginning with the Schwalbe class. By the mid-1890s, the navy began planning replacements for the older vessels of the Wolf and Habicht classes. The new ships were scheduled to begin construction by 1900, but the loss of the gunboat Iltis in a storm necessitated an immediate replacement, which was added to the 1898 naval budget. The new ship was planned to patrol the German colonial empire; requirements included engines powerful enough for the ship to steam up the Yangtze in China, where the new gunboat was intended to be deployed. Six ships were built in three identical pairs; each pair incorporated incremental improvements over the preceding set, and Panther was one of the last pair, along with Eber.

Panther was 66.9 meters (219 ft 6 in) long overall and had a beam of 9.7 m (31 ft 10 in) and a draft of 3.54 m (11 ft 7 in) forward. She displaced 977 metric tons (962 long tons) as designed and 1,193 t (1,174 long tons) at full load. The ship had a raised forecastle deck and a straight stem. Her superstructure consisted primarily of a conning tower with an open bridge atop it. She had a crew of 9 officers and 121 enlisted men.

Her propulsion system consisted of a pair of horizontal triple-expansion steam engines each driving a single screw propeller, with steam supplied by four coal-fired Thornycroft boilers. Exhaust was vented through two funnels located amidships. Panther could steam at a top speed of 13.5 knots (25.0 km/h; 15.5 mph) at 1,300 metric horsepower (1,300 ihp) as designed. The ship had a cruising radius of about 3,400 nautical miles (6,300 km; 3,900 mi) at a speed of 9 knots (17 km/h; 10 mph).

Panther was armed with a main battery of two 10.5 cm (4.1 in) SK L/40 guns, with 482 rounds of ammunition. One was placed on the forecastle and the other at the stern. She also carried six 37 mm (1.5 in) Maxim guns. The only armor protection carried by the ship was 8 mm (0.31 in) of steel plate on the conning tower.

== Service history ==
Panther, named after the eponymous cat genus, was laid down at the Kaiserliche Werft (Imperial Shipyard) in Danzig in July 1900 under the contract designation "A". (Note: German warships were ordered under provisional names. Additions to the fleet were given a single letter; ships intended to replace older or lost vessels were ordered as "Ersatz (name of the ship to be replaced)".) She was launched on 1 April 1901, and at the launching ceremony, she was christened by the wife of General August von Lentze, the commander of XVII Corps; the director of the shipyard, Kapitän zur See (Captain at Sea) Curt von Prittwitz und Gaffron gave a speech at the event. She was commissioned on 15 March 1902 to begin sea trials, which lasted until early May, when she went to the Kaiserliche Werft in Kiel for final fitting out. Her first commander was Korvettenkapitän (KK—Corvette Captain) Richard Eckermann. On the order of Kaiser Wilhelm II, Panther was sent along with the dispatch boat Sleipner to represent the Imperial Navy at the industrial and commercial exhibition in Düsseldorf. The two ships sailed to Rotterdam, the Netherlands, where they entered the Rhine. They arrived in Düsseldorf on 7 June; they were the first large German warships to visit the area, and they created such a stir in the populace that their visit was extended to 3 July. After departing, Panther stopped for two days in Duisburg, before arriving back in Wilhelmshaven on the North Sea coast on 13 July. There, her crew began preparations for her first overseas deployment, which included repainting the ship from gray to white and yellow.

=== East American Station ===
Panther sailed from Germany on 31 July 1902, bound for the East American Station. She arrived in Saint Thomas in the Danish West Indies on 30 August, where she joined the flagship of the station, the protected cruiser Vineta. The latter's commander, Kommodore (Commodore) Georg Scheder ordered Panther to steam to Haiti, where a revolt had broken out. The rebels, who controlled the gunboat Crête-à-Pierrot, seized the German HAPAG steamer SS Markomannia, which was carrying a shipment of weapons to the Haitian government. Panther was to intervene in the Markomannia incident and retrieve the captured ship. On 6 September, Panther located Crête-à-Pierrot in Gonaïves; she fired a warning shot that prompted most of the crew to abandon ship, but Admmiral Hammerton Killick remained board. He detonated ammunition in the stern of the ship, which would prevent her from being captured by the Germans. Panther then sank the wrecked ship with gunfire. Panther's guns both quickly failed after having fired five rounds and twenty-four shells from the forward and aft gun, respectively; the forward gun broke down completely, and the aft mounting proved to be too weak for the recoil of the 10.5 cm gun. The recoil began to pull apart the deck planking, which forced the crew to cease firing. There were concerns about how the United States would view the action in the context of the Monroe Doctrine. But despite legal advice describing the sinking as "illegal and excessive", the US State Department endorsed the action. The New York Times declared that "Germany was quite within its rights in doing a little housecleaning on her own account". The Haitian government later officially thanked the German government for destroying the rebel gunboat.

Vineta and Panther in the distance, shelling Fort San Carlos in January 1903

Vineta arrived to relieve Panther on 25 September, allowing the latter to sail to visit Venezuela. She steamed about 160 nmi (300 km; 180 mi) up the Orinoco river to visit the city of Ciudad Bolívar. By this time, tensions between Venezuela and Britain, Germany, and Italy had risen significantly over measures that the Venezuelan president, Cipriano Castro, had imposed to try to suppress a rebellion, including a blockade of several coastal cities. Castro also suspended payments toward foreign debts, which sparked the Venezuelan crisis of 1902–1903. The German naval command instructed their ships in the region to free any German merchant vessels that were seized by the Venezuelan Navy by force if necessary. No incidents involving German ships materialized, however, but the European powers concluded an agreement on 1 December to put an end to the blockade. For its part, Germany had assembled the East American Cruiser Division, led by Scheder aboard Vineta, and which also included Panther, the cruisers Falke and Gazelle, and the training ships Stein and Charlotte.

On 7 December, the Europeans gave Castro an ultimatum, which he ignored. Scheder then began to seize or neutralize Venezuelan warships, along with the British protected cruiser HMS Retribution and the destroyer HMS Quail, which were placed under his command. The ships carried out operations against the Venezuelan Navy between 10 and 14 December. Panther went to La Guaira on 10 December, where she captured the customs patrol vessel Zamorra, and then provided gunfire support to a landing party composed of men from Vineta and British vessels. Panther then moved to Maracaibo to enforce the blockade there along with Falke. On 17 January 1903, the Germans chased a merchant schooner, which had evaded the blockade and entered Lake Maracaibo, but were blocked from entering the lake by Venezuelan coastal fortifications. In retaliation, Panther bombarded Fort San Carlos, near Maracaibo. She was repulsed after the problems with her 10.5 cm guns reappeared and could not be returned to action; she could not maneuver in the confined waters to bring her other guns to bear, so she was forced to withdraw. The Venezuelans viewed the action as a victory, as the German ship had been compelled to retreat without inflicting any damage; the Germans viewed it as an affront to their honor that must be corrected. Accordingly, Vineta therefore was sent to silence the guns on 21 January. The Venezuelan gunners had already evacuated and suffered no casualties. The United States, which viewed itself as the protector of South America under the Monroe Doctrine, had initially ignored the European intervention but took an increasingly hostile view toward the Europeans as they became more aggressive, particularly after the attack on Fort San Carlos. The Europeans nevertheless requested the United States to arbitrate a settlement, which resulted in an agreement that Venezuela would receive all of the naval and civilian vessels that had been seized in return for resuming debt payments.

Panther thereafter sailed to San Juan, Puerto Rico, where unrest had broken out. From there, she sailed to Newport News, Virginia, in the United States for an overhaul, along with permanent repairs to her main battery guns to correct the deficiencies originally identified during the action with Crête-à-Pierrot. While there in June, Eckermann left the ship, leaving Kapitänleutnant (KL—Captain Lieutenant) Hans Seebohm (the executive officer) in command until KL Paul Jantzen arrived the following month to take permanent command. In late July, she joined the rest of the division for a cruise to visit Canadian ports. Panther later sailed to visit Veracruz, Mexico, in January 1904. While there, some of her crew traveled inland to Mexico City. In June, she sailed back to Newport News, where she received orders to return to Haiti. The German and French consuls in Port-au-Prince had been attacked by Haitian soldiers, and Panther was sent to obtain a settlement from the Haitian government. She was joined there by the large French protected cruiser Jurien de la Gravière. The presence of the vessels pressured the government to reach an acceptable agreement over the incident. On 19 October, the ship sailed to Willemstad, Curaçao, to assist the HAPAG steamer SS Graecia, which had run aground while attempting to help a British vessel.

On 15 March 1905, the naval command disbanded the East American Cruiser Division, leaving Panther to patrol the region by herself. In mid-1905, she toured several ports in southern Brazil. In February 1906, the ship cruised to the Rio de la Plata and visited Asunción, Paraguay. While there, the ship's captain (KK Timme) met with Cecilio Báez, the president of Paraguay. Panther arrived back in the Caribbean by mid-May, and she thereafter returned to Canadian waters; this time, she sailed into the St. Lawrence River to visit Montreal, Canada. On 21 December, Panther and the light cruiser Bremen sailed to Kingston, Jamaica, to try to rescue the wrecked HAPAG steamer Prinzessin Victoria Luise, but they were unsuccessful. In early July 1907, Panther received orders to transfer to the West African station; she departed the region on 5 August and began the voyage across the Atlantic, arriving in Las Palmas on 3 September.

=== African Station ===
After arriving in western African waters in early September, Panther toured ports along the coast on the way to Douala in the German colony of Kamerun. The following month, KK Theodor Fuchs arrived to take command of the ship. She embarked a detachment of surveyors in November to carry out mapping of the coastline of Germany's west African colonies, a project that had lain dormant since the recall of the gunboat Wolf in 1905. Panther spent much of the next four years surveying the coast, interrupted generally only by annual maintenance and overhaul periods in Cape Town, South Africa. Panther saw few events of note from 1907 to 1911, including a period in Lüderitz Bay in German South West Africa in 1908 during a diamond rush following the discovery of the gems in the Namib desert; she was sent there to observe the flood of individuals entering the colony to search for diamonds. On 26 June that year, the ship's crew erected a memorial in Swakopmund to the naval infantry who had died during the Herero Wars in 1904. In October 1910, while Panther cruised off Kribi, Kamerun, one of her boats capsized, and six men drowned. Later that year, the ship visited the ruins of the old Brandenburg–Prussian colonial fort at Groß Friedrichsburg.

==== Agadir Crisis ====
In early 1911, Panther left southern African waters and arrived in Douala on 28 May; there, she received orders to return home for a thorough overhaul. The ship visited numerous ports along the way north, and she stopped in Tenerife in the Canary Islands to replenish coal. While there on 1 July, she received amended orders to stop in Agadir in Morocco. The naval command issued the instruction to avoid French forces at the request of the Foreign Office; tensions in Europe were high at the time, and Panther's sister ship Eber had previously had difficulties with French soldiers in Mogador, Morocco. The Foreign Office intended the visit to pressure France for concessions elsewhere, but justified the stop under the pretext of protection German nationals in the port; in fact, the only German—Hermann Wilberg—arrived in Agadir three days after Panther reached the city. The presence of the gunboat in Morocco, which was then nominally independent but the subject of Spanish and French attempts to colonize the country, sparked the Agadir Crisis and triggered a major war scare in Europe.

Panther spent most of July in the port, leaving only once to replenish coal at Santa Cruz de Tenerife. On 4 July, the light cruiser SMS Berlin arrived to reinforce the ship. Panther ultimately left on 25 July and resumed the voyage back to Germany. As a result of the incident, the French and German governments engaged in lengthy negotiations that produced the Morocco–Congo Treaty in November; the agreement included territorial exchanges in central Africa in exchange for German recognition of French interest in Morocco. In addition, the partial mobilization of the British Royal Navy during the crisis was used to justify the passing of the fourth amendment to the Naval Law in 1912, which further exacerbated the Anglo-German naval arms race.

==== Return to Africa ====
After arriving in Germany, Panther underwent an extensive overhaul at the Kaiserliche Werft in Danzig from 19 August to 20 December. She then moved to Kiel, where her crew made preparations to return to West Africa. The ship got underway again on 5 January 1912, but the voyage to African waters was fraught with international tension owing to the Agadir Crisis. The Belgian government declined a visit to Brussels and an opportunity to coal in Antwerp. Instead, the ship stopped in Southampton, Britain, and Lisbon, Portugal, but the press vilified Panther in Portugal. After arriving in Las Palmas, Panther resumed her previous routine of coastal surveying work. In April, she visited Groß Friedrichsburg again, and her crew discovered old Prussian artillery barrels, which were shipped back to Germany with permission of the local British colonial authorities.

In November 1912, unrest broke out in Monrovia, Liberia, prompting Panther to sail there to protect German nationals in the city. She temporarily embarked a group of farmers and businessmen during the crisis, which worsened and led to the Germans sending Eber and the light cruiser Bremen to reinforce Panther. While cruising in the Grand Cess River, Panther came under attack from Kru rebels. The situation had calmed by early April 1913, allowing Panther to leave the Liberian coast. The rest of the year passed uneventfully, and by early 1914, the ship was in need of another overhaul. She left West Africa on 21 April and arrived in Danzig, where work on the ship began.

=== World War I and fate ===
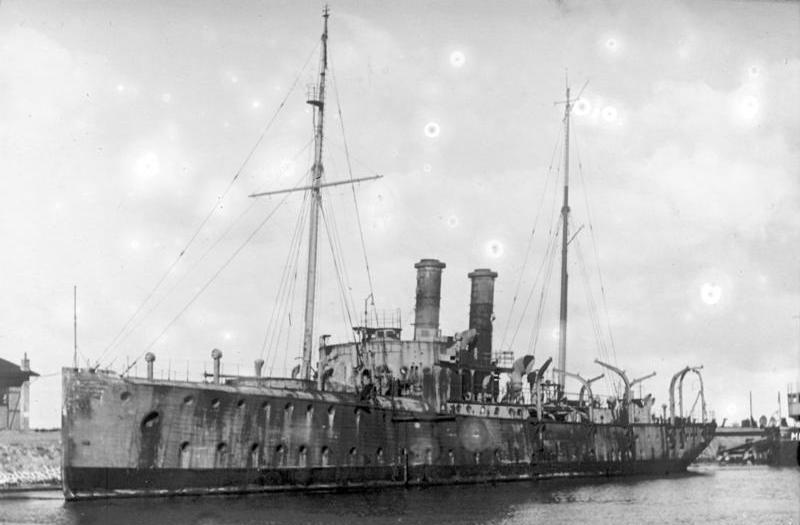
Panther in 1931 shortly before her disposal

Panther arrived in Kiel on 9 July 1914, ready for further service. The ship was not deployed abroad, however, as Europe was already embroiled in the July Crisis following the assassination of Archduke Franz Ferdinand in Sarajevo the previous month. On 27 July, as war became imminent, the ship was assigned to the local defense forces in Kiel. After war broke out the next day, Panther joined the Coastal Defense Division of the Baltic Sea. At the start of August, she was sent to patrol the Fehmarn Belt, but on 5 August, she was transferred to the Great Belt. By late September, she had moved again to the Little Belt. On 23 August, Panther took the U-boat U-3 under tow to the island of Gotland, from which the submarine was to sortie into the Gulf of Finland to attack Russian vessels. Panther returned to port the following day.

Beginning in January 1915, Panther began patrolling the area off Aarøsund, where she remained until autumn that year, when she moved back to the Little Belt. From 1 January to 20 March 1916, Panther operated with the Minelaying Division, based at Friedrichsort. She thereafter returned to the Coastal Defense Division. That month, KK Velten took command of the ship, and he was also given the title "Senior Commander of the Guard Forces in the Little Belt", placing all other patrol vessels in the area under his command. From 20 May to 18 June, Panther was overhauled and her guns were replaced at the Kaiserlich Werft in Kiel and then repairs at the Stülcken-Werft in Hamburg. Beginning in April 1917, she served as the flagship of patrol vessels in the Aarøsund area. Following the German surrender in November 1918, Panther was decommissioned on 18 December.

Panther recommissioned again on 10 July 1921 for use as a survey ship under the command of KK Fritz Conrad. She was disarmed for this purpose (though she occasionally carried a single 8.8 cm (3.5 in) gun for training purposes). After completing modifications, Panther was used to train officers and crewmen for the survey vessel Meteor. In October 1924, KL Wilhelm Marschall relieved Conrad as the ship's captain. Panther was decommissioned again on 15 December 1926; she remained in the navy's inventory until 31 March 1931, when she was struck from the naval register. She was sold to ship breakers on 10 November in Kiel to a Frankfurt-based firm that scrapped the ship in Wilhelmshaven.
