= USS Samoset =

Tugboat of the United States Navy

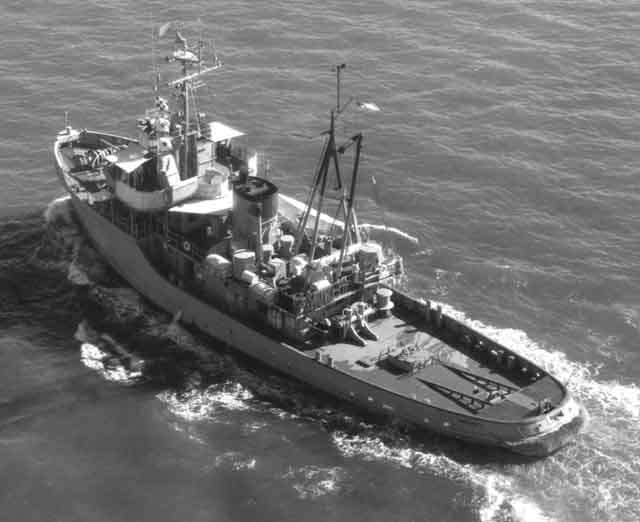
- USS Samoset (ATA-190) underway from Naval Station Norfolk, circa 1963.

History

United States
- Name: USS Samoset (ATA-190)
- Builder: Levingston Shipbuilding Co., Orange, TX
- Laid down: 29 September 1944
- Launched: 26 October 1944
- Commissioned: 1 January 1945
- Decommissioned: 12 September 1969
- Reclassified: Auxiliary Fleet Tug ATA-190,15 May 1944
- Stricken: 1 July 1978
- Fate: Transferred, cash sale, to Haiti under the Security Assistance Program, 1 October 1978

Haiti
- Name: Henri Christophe
- Namesake: Henri Christophe
- Acquired: 1 October 1978 (purchase)
- Identification: MM20
- Fate: Removed from service as of 1993

General characteristics
- Class & type: Sotoyomo-class tugboat
- Displacement: 534 t.(lt) 835 t.(fl)
- Length: 143 ft (44 m)
- Beam: 33 ft (10 m)
- Draft: 13 ft (4.0 m)
- Propulsion: diesel-electric engines, single screw
- Speed: 13 knots (24 km/h; 15 mph)
- Complement: 45
- Armament: one single 3 in (76 mm) dual purpose gun mount; two twin 40 mm AA gun mounts

ATA-190, originally projected as ATR-117, was laid down on 29 September 1944 by the Levingston Shipbuilding Co., Orange, Texas; launched on 26 October 1944; and commissioned on 1 January 1945.

Following shakedown, ATA-190, an auxiliary ocean tug, proceeded to Panama; thence, with YN-108 in tow, continued on to Pearl Harbor. Arriving on 4 March, she departed 10 days later; and, on 9 April, she delivered her tows, a YF and a barge, to Guam. Joining ServRon 10 there, she got underway again on the 20th; and, by the end of the month, had delivered a pontoon barge to Kenmu Wan, Okinawa. On 3 May, she shifted to the Hagushi anchorage. On the 5th, she proceeded to Kerama Retto. On the 6th, she sailed southeast; and, during the remaining months of World War II, she took tows from the Carolines and the New Hebrides to the Philippines and, from the latter, escorted a convoy of landing craft to Okinawa.

When the war ended in mid-August, the ATA was at San Pedro Bay, Philippines. In early September, she moved up to Okinawa again, then proceeded to Japan, anchoring off Wakayama on the 8th. For the next month, she assisted the minecraft sweeping the entrance to Kii Suido and participated in harbor clearance salvage operations in the wake of a typhoon. In October, she shifted to Nagoya; again assisted in opening shipping lanes to peacetime traffic, then commenced guide-and-pilot-vessel duties in that area.

In December, ATA-190 shifted to Yokosuka; assisted in rebuilding facilities there; and, in March 1946, she got underway for the United States. Steaming via Okinawa, Peleliu, Subic Bay, and Pearl Harbor, she arrived in San Francisco Bay on 29 July; transited the Panama Canal in mid-September; and moored at Norfolk, Virginia on the 26th.

The ATA, assigned to the 10th Naval District, commenced towing operations out of Puerto Rico at the end of October. For the next three years, she operated primarily in the Caribbean, with occasional tows to, and temporary duty at, ports on the southeast coast of the United States. Named Samoset on 16 July 1948, she was assigned to the 5th Naval District in November 1949 and arrived at her new homeport, Norfolk, in mid-December. From that time, through the 1950s, and until August 1969, she provided towing services for that district; for various commands of the Atlantic Fleet; and in support of Office of Naval Research and Oceanographic Office projects.

On 12 August 1969, Samoset was ordered inactivated. A month later, on 12 September, she was decommissioned at Norfolk; and, on 3 December 1970, she was transferred to the custody of the Maritime Administration and berthed in the James River as a unit of the National Defense Reserve Fleet, where she remained until being sold to Haiti on 1 October 1978 as Henri Christophe.

ATA-190 earned one battle star for World War II service.
