= Markomannia incident =

Incident between Haitian Rebels and german cargo vessel Markomannia

The Markomannia incident was a conflict between Haitian rebels and the German Empire in 1902, sparked by the boarding of the Hamburg steamer Markomannia by rebel naval forces.

== Incident ==
The Markomannia (3335 BRT, 1890) was a steamer of the Hamburg America Line on the West Indies-Hamburg route, commanded by Captain Nansen. On 2 September 1902 she was stopped off the Haitian port of Cap-Haïtien by the Haitian gunboat Crête-à-Pierrot and searched for contraband. The Crête-à-Pierrot was under the control of Anténor Firmin's faction, which was rebelling against the provisional government of president Boisrond-Canal. The commander of the Pierrot was rebel admiral Hammerton Killick. Killick assumed that the Markomannia was carrying weapons and supplies to government forces. She was thus searched by a boarding party and, despite protests from Nansen and the German consul in Cap-Haïtien, transferred the weapons and supplies on board to the Pierrot. The Markomannia was then allowed to continue her voyage, delayed but undamaged.

== Battle between SMS Panther and Crete-à-Pierrot ==
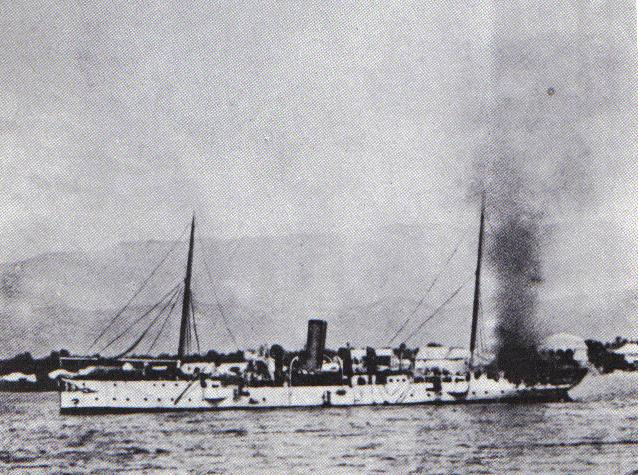
The Crête-à-Pierrot with her stern on fire during the battle

German residents had already been harmed in Haiti's civil war and so after the incident the German minister-resident in the Haitian capital Port-au-Prince, Francsen, immediately called in a German warship. The Kaiserliche Marine sent the SMS Panther to find the rebel ship. Admiral Killick evacuated his crew and blew up the aft magazines of Crête-à-Pierrot, which was by then under fire from the Panther commanded by Richard Eckermann. Killick and four crewmen went down with the ship. There were concerns about how the United States would view the action in the context of the Monroe Doctrine. But despite legal advice describing the sinking as "illegal and excessive", the US State Department endorsed the action. The New York Times declared that "Germany was quite within her rights in doing a little housecleaning on her own account".

== Aftermath ==
Due to protests of the Haitian population, the Panther for the time being did not call at any North Haitian harbours. Apparently, riots against German residents did not occur, particularly because Firmin was considered to be friendly with the Germans. For the provisional government that did not have naval forces, the German intervention was a welcome reinforcement of its military capabilities that enabled unhindered transport of weapons by ship, including imports from foreign countries.

In 1943 Haiti issued a stamp with the portrait of Killick. In the same year, Charles Moravia published the play L´amiral Killick: drame historique aux trois tableaus (Port-au-Prince 1943). The German Kriegsmarine continued to celebrate the anniversary of the sinking of the Crete.

== Bibliography ==
- o.V.: Die Vernichtung des haitianischen Rebellenkreuzers "Crete à Pierrot" durch S.M.Kbt. "Panther", in: Marine-Rundschau, 13. Jg., 1902, S. 1189-1197.
- Fritz Otto Busch: Traditionshandbuch der Kriegsmarine, München/Berlin 1937, S. 114.
- Gerhard Wiechmann: Die preußisch-deutsche Marine in Lateinamerika 1866-1914. Eine Studie deutscher Kanonenbootpolitik, Bremen 2002, S. 72-80.
