= Haitian gunboat Crête-à-Pierrot =

Haitian gunboat

Crête-à-Pierrot
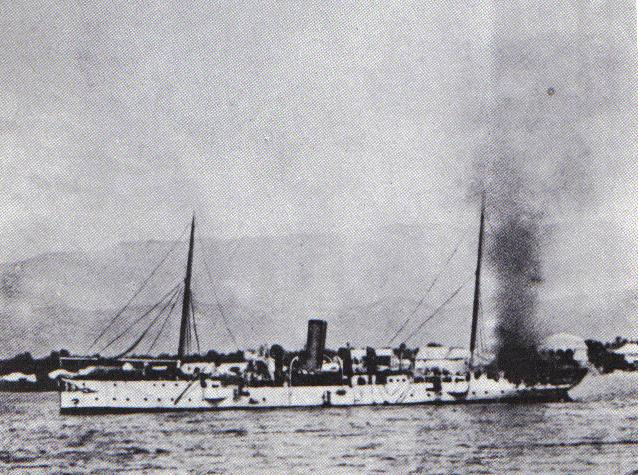

History

Haiti
- Name: Crête-à-Pierrot
- Namesake: Battle of Crête-à-Pierrot
- Builder: Earle's Shipbuilding & Engineering Co, Hull (Yard 396)
- Launched: 7 November 1895
- Commissioned: 1896
- Out of service: 1902
- Fate: Destroyed to prevent capture

General characteristics
- Type: Gunboat
- Displacement: 950 tons
- Length: 209 ft (64 m)
- Installed power: Triple expansion steam engines
- Propulsion: 1 × propeller
- Speed: 16 knots (30 km/h)
- Complement: 175
- Armament: 1 × 16 cm gun; 1 × 12 cm gun; 4 × 10 cm guns; 4 × Nordenfelt machine guns; 2 × Maxim machine guns

Crête-à-Pierrot was a gunboat in the Haitian Navy named after the 1802 Battle of Crête-à-Pierrot in the Haitian Revolution (1791 – 1804). The boat was destroyed by Admiral Hammerton Killick in 1902 to prevent it falling into the hands of a German warship.

== Description ==
The ship displaced 950 tons. It was powered by a triple expansion steam engine driving a single screw propeller, giving a speed of 16 knots (30 km/h). Armament comprised a 16 cm, 12 cm and four 10 cm guns, four Nordenfelt machine guns and two Maxim machine guns.

== Commission ==
The Haitian Government commissioned an armed cruiser to be designed by Sir E J Reed and built by Earle's Shipbuilding & Engineering Co at Hull, Yorkshire, England. The ship was launched as Crête-à-Pierrot, named for the revolutionary battle of Crête-à-Pierrot, on 7 November 1895. After arming in France, it was added to the Haitian Navy in 1896 and considered the Navy's crown jewel, the best of the four ships it possessed at the time.

Crête-à-Pierrot's first commander was Captain Gilmour, from Scotland, who served under contract to Haiti.

== Destruction ==
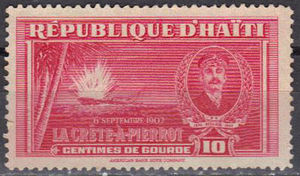
In 1943 the ship appeared on a postage stamp commemorating its 1902 destruction

In 1902 Haiti was enveloped in a civil war over who would become president after the sudden resignation of Tirésias Simon Sam. Crête-à-Pierrot was controlled by Admiral Hammerton Killick and supporters of Anténor Firmin and was used to blockade ports where Pierre Nord Alexis was gathering troops. There was a plan to use Crête-à-Pierrot to transport Firmin to Port-au-Prince while Jean Jumeau marched on Port-au-Prince by land.

In September 1902, Crête-à-Pierrot seized a German ammunition ship, Markomannia en route to provide ammunition to Alexis' forces. Alexis asked Germany for help subduing a pirate ship. In response, Germany sent the gunboat SMS Panther to find and capture Crête-à-Pierrot.

On 6 September, Crête-à-Pierrot was in port at Gonaïves, with Killick and most of the crew on Shore leave when Panther appeared. Killick rushed aboard and ordered his crew to abandon ship. When all but four crew members had evacuated the ship Killick, inspired by the tale of Captain LaPorte, wrapped himself in a Haitian flag, fired the aft magazine, and blew up the ship rather than let the Germans take her. Killick and the remaining four crew members went down with the ship.

An hour later, Panther fired thirty shots at Crête-à-Pierrot to finish it off, then sailed away. The ship's rifles and machine guns were salvaged, along with the bodies of the crew that remained on board.

== Gallery ==
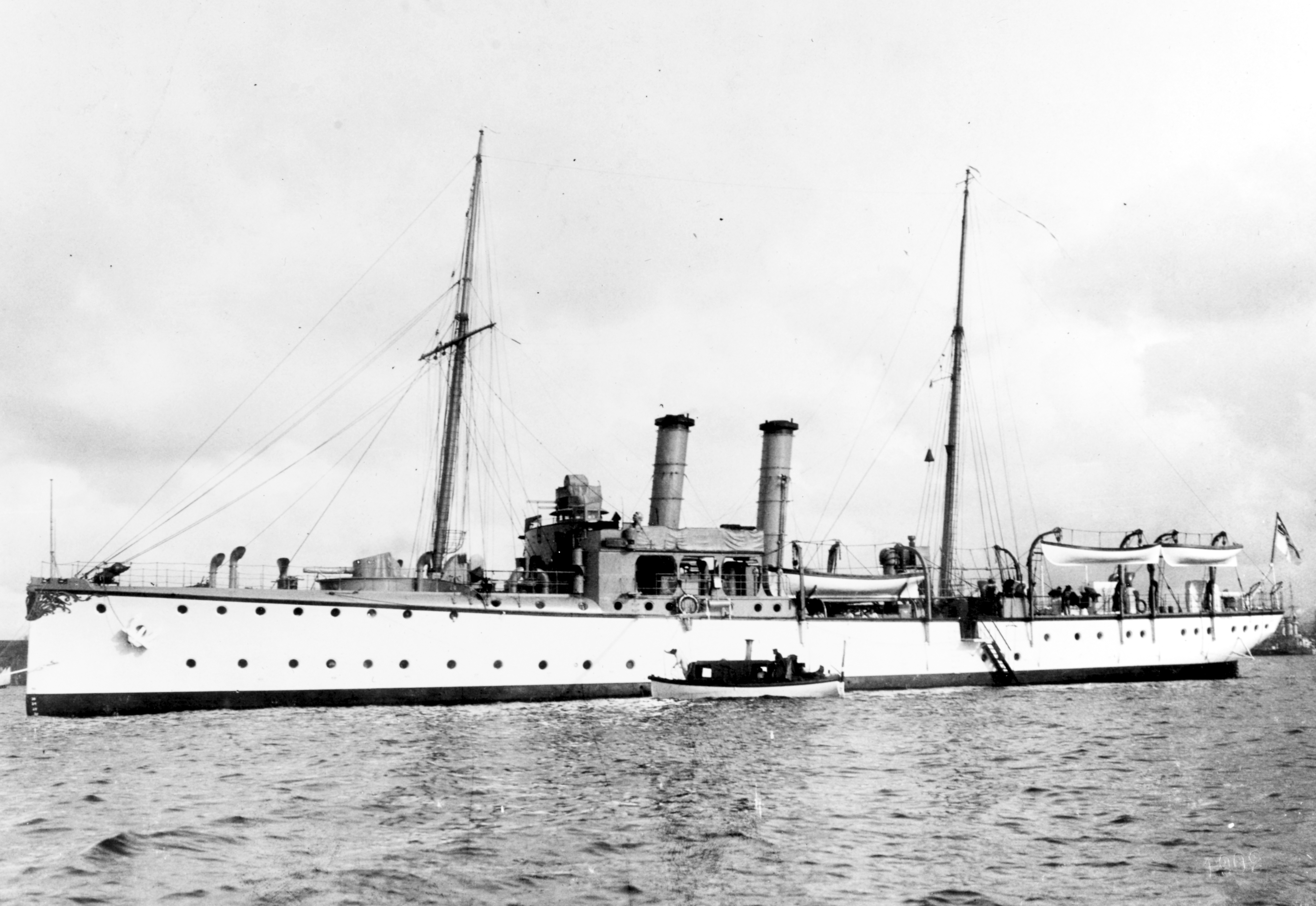
SMS Panther, the German ship sent to capture Crête-à-Pierrot.

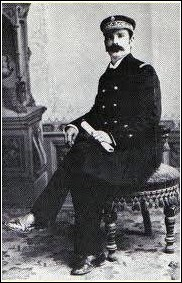
Admiral Hammerton Killick, who destroyed the ship rather than let the Germans have her.

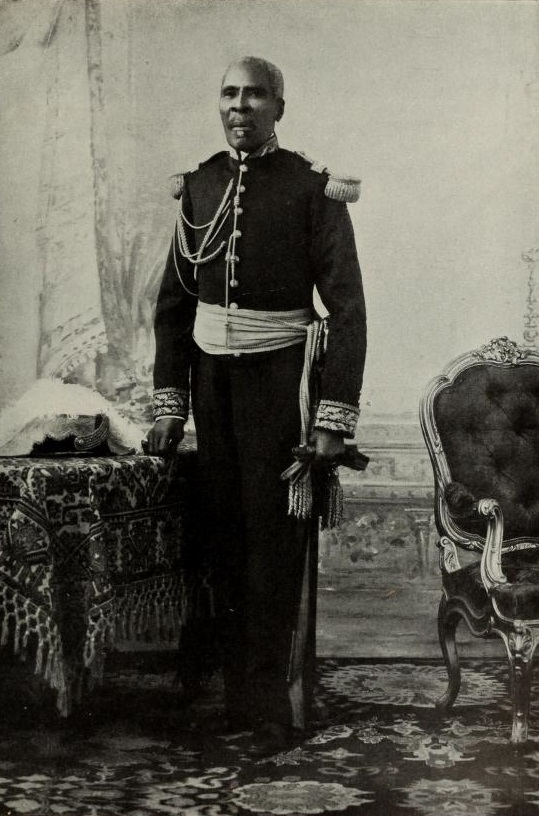
Pierre Nord Alexis, the 19th President of Haiti.

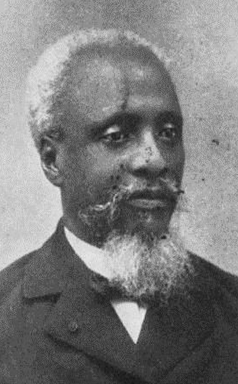
Anténor Firmin. The ship was destroyed in civil war over who would become the 19th President of Haiti.

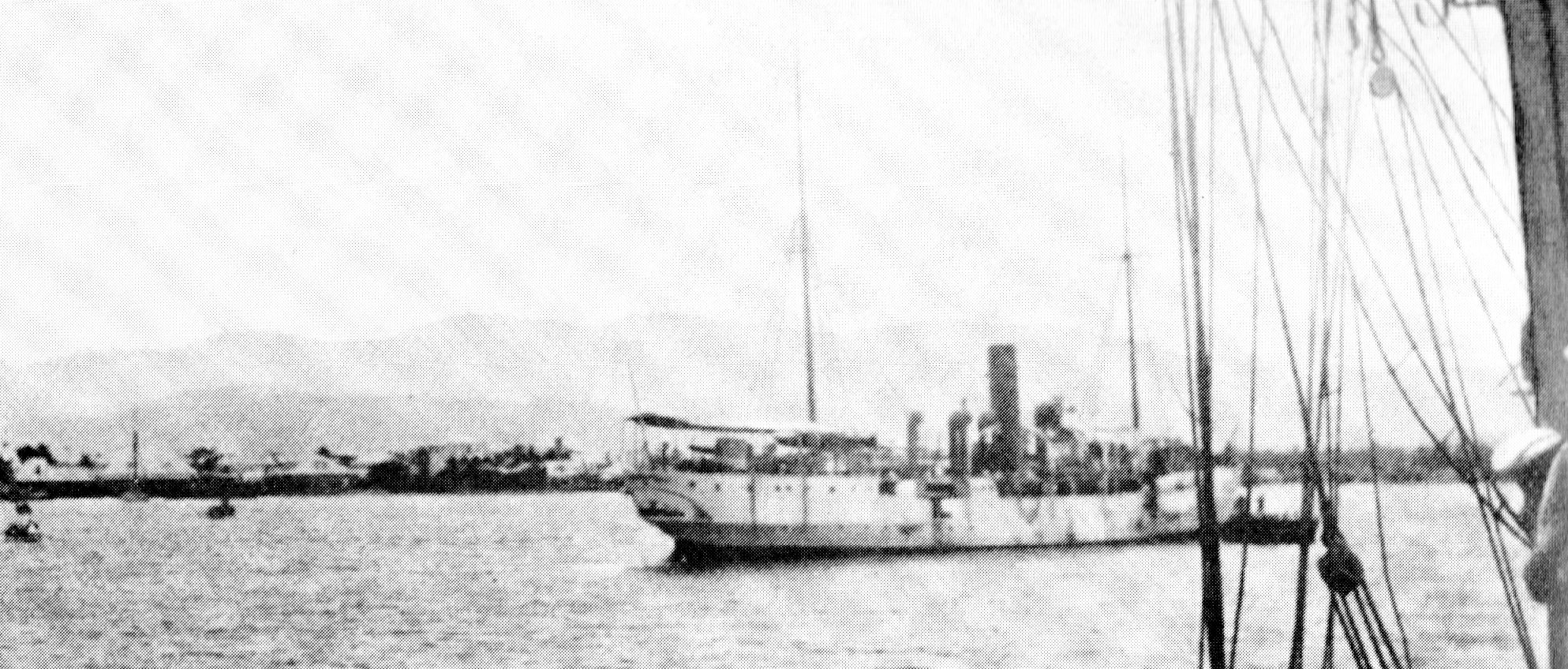
Haitian gunboat Crête-à-Pierrot on 6 September 1902 at the Port of Gonaives shortly before the sinking by SMS Panther.

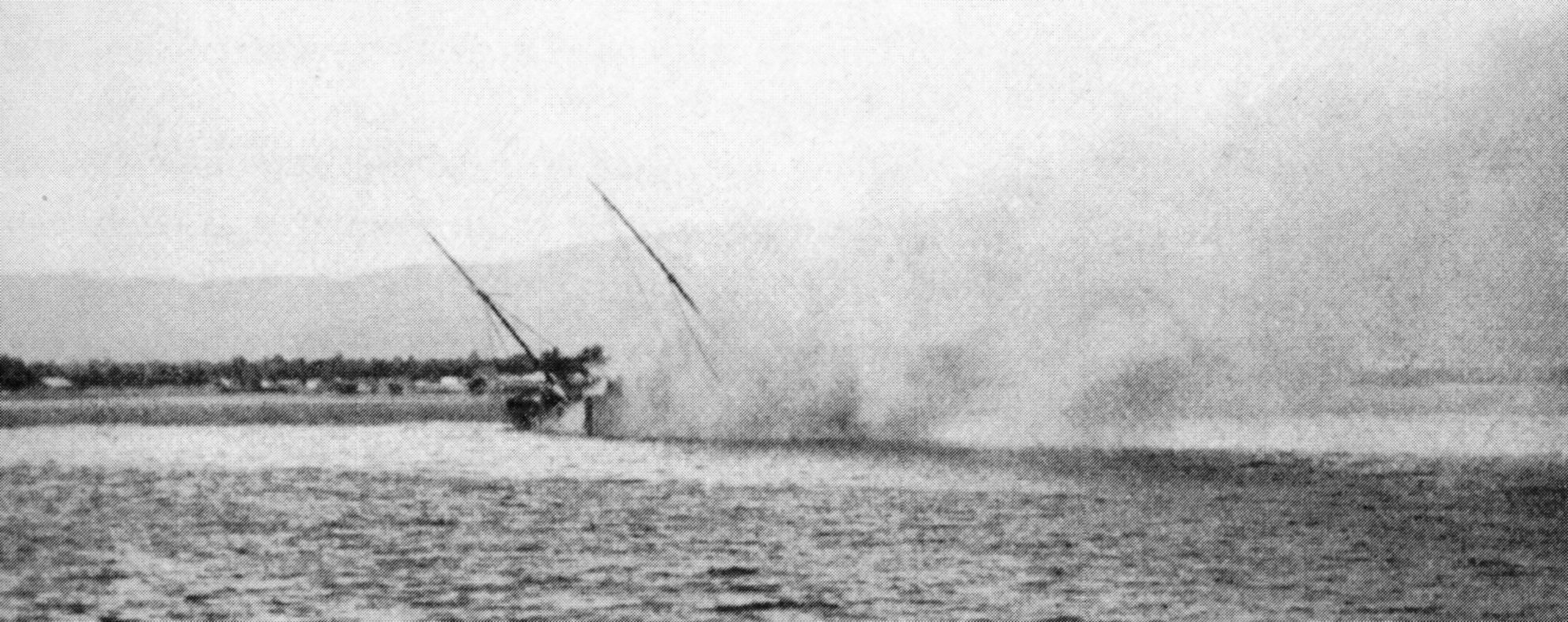
The Haitian gunboat Crete-à-Pierrot sinking after bombardment by SMS Panther in the port of Gonaives 6 September 1902.

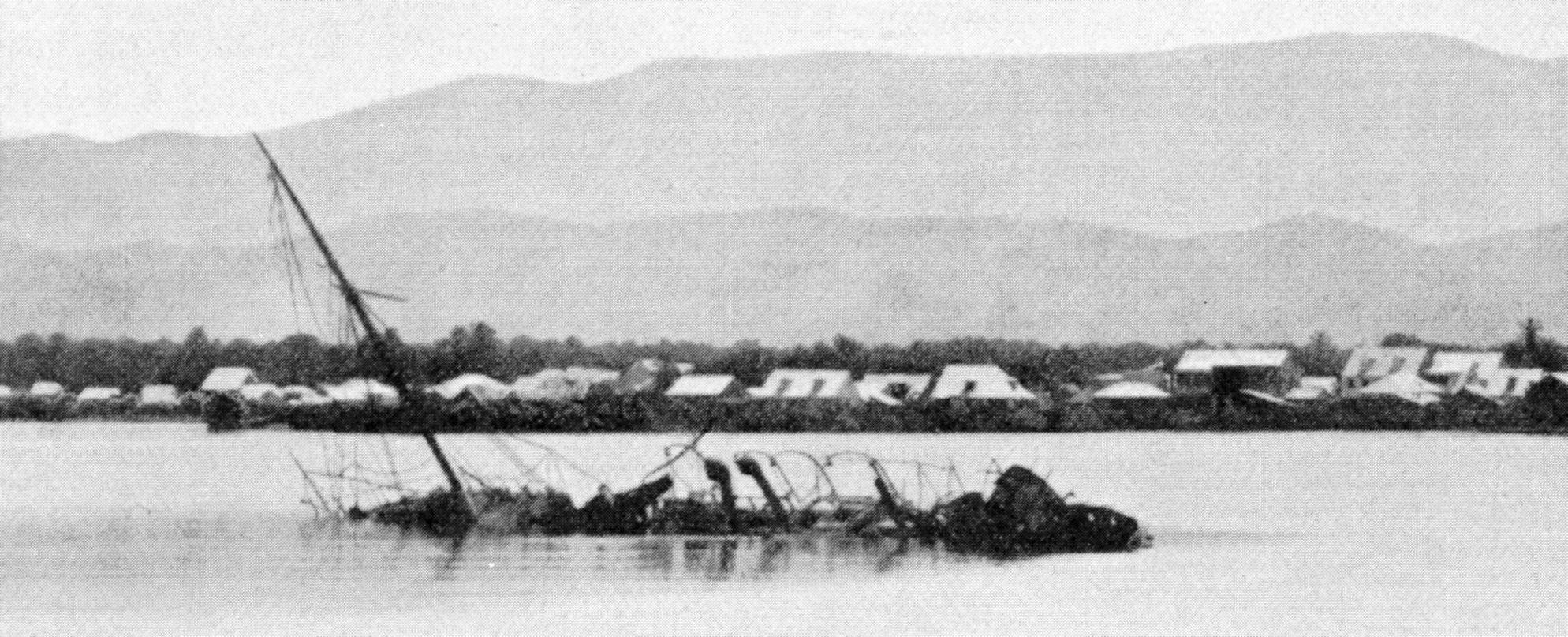
Wreck of the Haitian gunboat Crete-à-Pierrot in the port of Gonaives on 6 September 1902.

== Bibliography ==
- Davis, William H. (1977). "Question 3/77". Warship International. XIV (3): 262–263. ISSN 0043-0374.
