= Charles Whitlock =

Charles Whitlock may refer to:

- Charles C. Whitlock (1879–1960), American college football player, coach and prosecutor
- Charles D. Whitlock, American academic administrator
