= Operation Unified Response =

US military's response to the 2010 Haiti earthquake

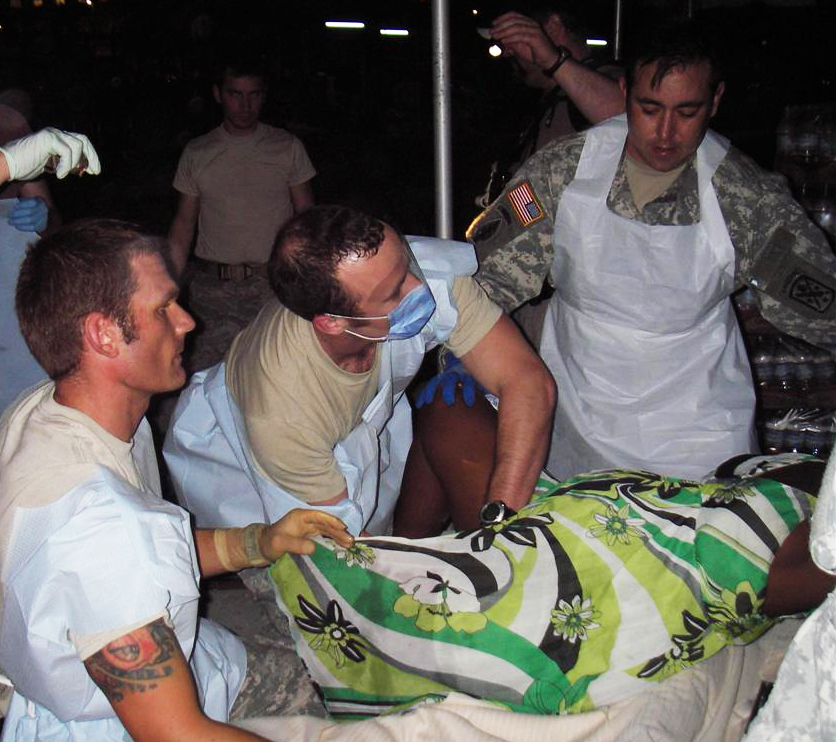
Medics from the US Army's 95th Civil Affairs Brigade deliver a baby during relief efforts. The mother named the female child "Samantha" after Uncle Sam.

Operation Unified Response was the United States military's response to the 2010 Haiti earthquake. It was conducted by Joint Task Force Haiti and commanded by United States Southern Command (USSOUTHCOM) Military Deputy Commander Lieutenant General Ken Keen, although the overall U.S. government response was headed by Rajiv Shah, administrator of the United States Agency for International Development (USAID).

The response included personnel from all branches of the military. The U.S. Navy listed its resources in the area on 19 January as "17 ships, 48 helicopters and 12 fixed-wing aircraft" in addition to 10,000 sailors and Marines. By 26 January, the U.S. military had 17,000 personnel in and around Haiti. Between the beginning of relief efforts and 18 February the US Air Force had delivered nearly 6,000 support members and 19 million pounds of cargo while evacuating 15,000 American citizens and conducted aeromedical evacuations for 223 critical Haitian patients.

Elements of the mission included flying in relief supplies, flying out evacuees, including medical evacuees, loading helicopters with supplies at the PAP airport, and then dropping supplies at various points around Port-au-Prince, airdropping supplies from fixed-wing aircraft, establishing a field hospital near the Port international de Port-au-Prince, repairing a pier at the port, providing imagery from satellite, Global Hawk, and U-2 assets.

== Mission timeline ==
Air traffic control operations by USAF Special Operations Combat Controllers at Port-au-Prince airport.

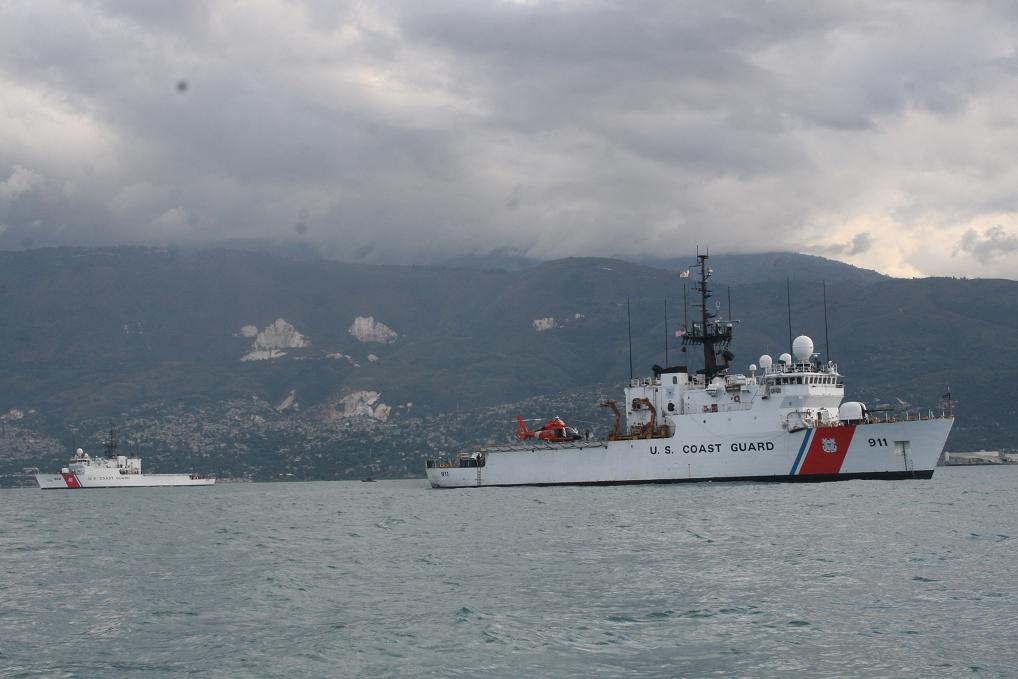
Two United States Coast Guard Cutters off Port-au-Prince, Haiti. USCGC Forward is in the foreground.

- The United States Coast Guard cutters USCGC Forward and USCGC Mohawk, both arrived at Port-au-Prince, on 13 January. A Maritime Intelligence Support Team aboard Forward assessed damage to the port. The cutters were supported by the destroyer USS Higgins. Two United States Air Force special operations MC-130H Combat Talon II aircraft also arrived 13 January with emergency supplies, medical units and special tactics teams. Other Coast Guard ships including the USCGC Valiant and the USCGC Tahoma were dispatched.
- As of 14 January, United States Air Force Special Operations personnel were controlling operations of the Toussaint Louverture International Airport in Port-au-Prince, after having cleared runways and having set up a 24-hour air traffic control.
- On 15 January, the aircraft carrier USS Carl Vinson arrived off the coast of Port-au-Prince to provide humanitarian aid, with its trained personnel, emergency supplies and 19 helicopters on deck.
- The United States Navy hospital ship USNS Comfort with 1,000 beds and 956 naval hospital staff was deployed to Haiti, as were the guided-missile frigate USS Underwood, and the guided missile cruiser USS Normandy.
- Approximately 2,200 United States Marines of the 22nd Marine Expeditionary Unit from Marine Corps Base Camp Lejeune sailed on the USS Bataan, USS Carter Hall, and USS Fort McHenry; while 3,000 United States Army soldiers of the XVIII Airborne Corps HQ and the 82nd Airborne Division from Fort Bragg were sent beginning on 13 January.
- On 16 January, USS Bunker Hill arrived in Haiti to assist the Carl Vinson.
- On 17 January, the USCGC Oak and the USNS Grasp arrived at Port-au-Prince to begin repairs to the wharves.
- On the 18th, USS Gunston Hall anchored at Killick base, and started relief operations.
- Additional Marines from the 24th MEU on the USS Nassau, USS Mesa Verde, and USS Ashland, which sailed from Naval Station Norfolk on the 18th, were diverted on the 20th from their scheduled deployment to the Middle East. This was the first use of the V-22 Osprey for a humanitarian mission.
- Four injured personnel from the United States embassy were evacuated to the naval base at Guantánamo Bay, Cuba, by United States Coast Guard helicopters.
- As of 21 January, approximately 10,500 people have been evacuated from Haiti to the US, including 8,300 US citizens. Approximately 45,000 American citizens were thought to have been in Haiti at the time of the earthquake.
- On 21 January, Air National Guard (ANG) air traffic controllers from the 260th Air Traffic Control Squadron (ATCS) in collaboration with the 248th ATCS, the 258th ATCS and the FAA took over air traffic control operations at Toussaint Louverture International Airport in Port-au-Prince. With an exorbitant amount of supplies, support, and aide in conjunction with evacuation operations, Toussaint Louverture International Airport became the busiest single runway Airport in the world averaging 675 operation per day.
- On 1 February, the Carl Vinson, Bunker Hill, and USNS Henson ended their mission departed Haiti.
- On 3 February, the Higgins ended its relief mission and has headed for its home port.
- On 8 February, the 24th MEU and Nassau amphibious ready group were ordered to resume their original deployment to the Middle East.
- On 12 February, the US relief force has been reduced from roughly 20,000 troops to roughly 13,000 troops.
- On 13 February, the Gundston Hall ended its relief mission and has headed back to its original mission.
- On 14 February, the 190th Civil Engineering Squadron of the Kansas Air National Guard returned home.
- On 18 February, the Oak has left Haiti and arrived back at home port.
- On 1 March, Carter Hall was ordered home.
- On 8 March, Comfort had discharged its last patient, and departed on 10 March.
- On 24 March, the 22nd MEU and ARG were released from their mission and sailed for home.

== International reactions ==
The United Nations expressed approval of the mission by United States and stated that the American troops would not stay long.

Elements of the public of France expressed dissatisfaction with both the much larger size of the American relief operations compared to those of European nations and the commanding role U.S. forces took on the ground. Reflecting these feelings the French Minister for the Francophonie, Alain Joyandet, characterized the United States as "occupying" Haiti, citing the take over of air traffic control in the country.

In a statement the Italian government moved to distance itself from the Italian Civil Protection head, Guido Bertolaso, who asserted that the U.S. effort was badly lead and managed, lacking a "rapport" with aid organizations and local people.

Several Latin American leaders accused the United States of militarily occupying Haiti. These socialist leaders, all long-time critics of the United States, included Venezuelan president Hugo Chavez former Cuban President Fidel Castro, Bolivian President Evo Morales and Nicaraguan President Daniel Ortega. Through its Department of State the United States rejected the allegations and pointed to the fact that US forces were there by the invitation of the Haitian government. Despite this United States Congressman Ron Paul (R-Texas) opposed House of Representatives Resolution 1021, citing concerns over "the possibility of an open-ended US military occupation of Haiti".

== Legacy ==
Air Force Chief Master Sergeant Antonio D. Travis was named one of the top 100 most influential people of 2010 by TIME Magazine for his role in Operation Unified Response. Chief Travis is a combat controller who deployed to Port-au-Prince just 30 hours after the earthquake. His team set up a card table to conduct air traffic control operations for Toussaint L'Ouverture International Airport, and was recognized for orchestrating the largest single-runway operation in history. The combat control team ran the airport for 12 days before US Air Force air traffic controllers took over. During those 12 days the team oversaw more than 4,000 takeoffs and landings, an average of one every five minutes. Their efforts are credited for ensuring the safe delivery many humanitarian relief teams from around the world and thousands of tons of life saving supplies.

== See also ==
- Operation Hestia, the Canadian military's counterpart
- Opération Séisme Haiti 2010, the French military's counterpart
- Operation Unified Assistance, for the 2004 Indian Ocean tsunami
- Operation United Assistance, for the 2014 Ebola virus epidemic in West Africa
