= Port international du Cap-Haïtien =

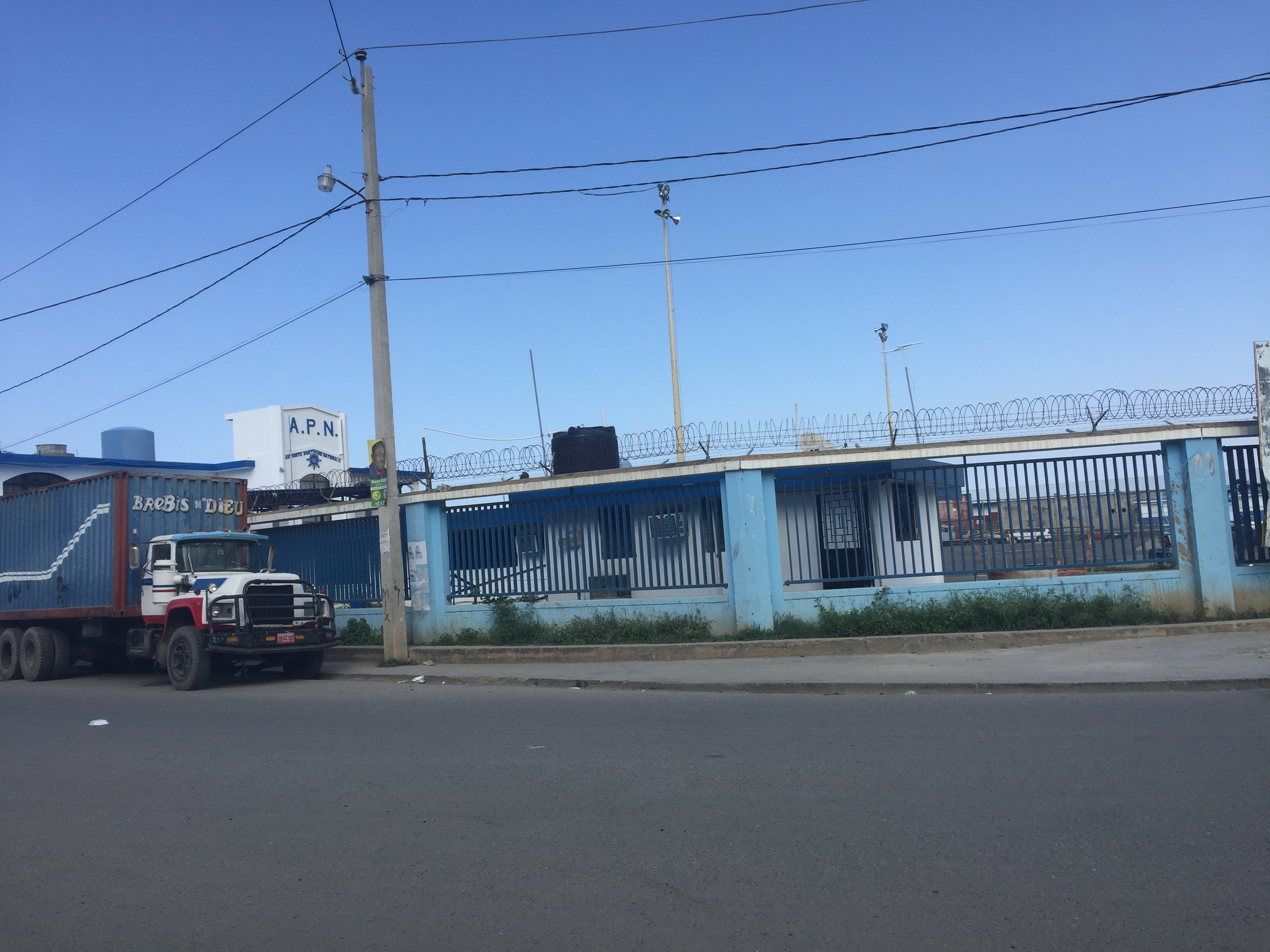
- Port international du Cap-Haïtien
- Click on the map for a fullscreen view

Location
- Country: Haiti
- Location: Cap-Haïtien
- Coordinates: 19°45′31″N 72°11′42″W
- UN/LOCODE: HTCAP

Details
- Operated by: APN
- Owned by: Autorité Portuaire Nationale (Haiti)

Statistics
- Website www.apn.gouv.ht

The Port international du Cap-Haïtien is the seaport in Cap-Haïtien Haiti's second largest city. It is operated by the government port authority Autorité Portuaire Nationale APN.

== Facilities ==
Two access channels leading to the Port:

- Channel-West, 1 mile long, from 10 to 15 m deep, well marked by navigation aids
- Channel-East, marked by tags of day (is hardly used)
- Turning basin and berth wide, 11 to 18 m deep
- Steering: Valid anytime
- Radio: VHF Channel 16 or 12
- Anchoring and quarantine: Buoy No. 1

Services offered: pilotage, mooring, storage, handling, grouping and unbundling of containers, home cruises, marina, water reservoir of 800 m³ capacity.

=== Quay characteristics ===
There are four docks:

The platform of Cruise:

- 176 m long
- 10.5 m water depth
- 7 bollards

The pier-International Trade:

- 250 m long
- 9.5 m water depth
- RORO ramp of 30 m wide
- 13 bollards
- Electricity for refrigerated containers
- Storage
- Covered area: 2210 m²
- Open area: 72,000 m², including 45,000 square meters for containers

Equipment proper handling

- the platform of cabotage
- 100 m long
- 3.5 m water depth

Open-storage area of 0.5 ha

- Marina:
- 100 m long
- 2.4 water depth
- 40 bollards available-area of 13,000 m²

== Military ==
The Haitian Coast Guard has one of its main bases in Cap-Haïtien.

== Container Terminal ==
Port du Cap-Haïtien's container terminal opened in 1998, and is owned and operated by the Fatima Group, a Miami-based conglomerate controlled by the oligarch Fred Beliard and his family.

== Rehabilitation ==
USAID financed $24 million of works to renovate the port beginning in May 2024.
