= Ruric Nevel Roark =

American academic administrator (1859–1909)

Ruric N. Roark
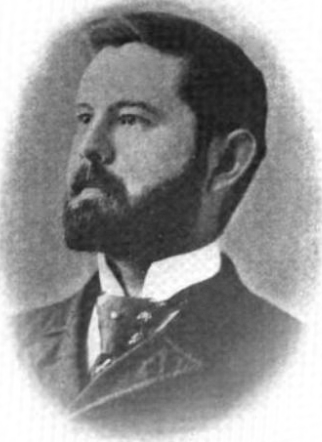

1st President of Eastern Kentucky University
- In office May 9, 1906 – April 14, 1909
- Preceded by: Office established
- Succeeded by: Mary Creegan Roark

Personal details
- Born: May 19, 1859; Greenville, Kentucky
- Died: April 14, 1909 (aged 49); Cincinnati, Ohio, U.S.
- Resting place: Richmond Cemetery, Richmond, Kentucky
- Spouse: Mary Creegan Roark (m. 1882)
- Education: National Normal University

Ruric Nevel Roark (May 19, 1859 – April 14, 1909) was Eastern Kentucky University's first president. He held that title from 1906 until his death in 1909. Roark started many of the initial plans to add to and expand the campus. Though he never got to lay eyes on them, Roark is said to be responsible for the construction of three buildings on EKU's campus, the University Building, the Miller Gymnasium, and Memorial Hall. Roark also has a building on Eastern Kentucky University's campus named after him.

== Early life and childhood ==
Roark was born to Captain M. J. Roark and Nan Davis Roark May 19, 1859, in Greenville, Kentucky. Growing up, Roark's father was not around often. Captain Roark was a member of the legislature in the capital of Frankfort, Kentucky and was gone for extended periods of time. They wrote to each other often. Ruric N. Roark often told his father how much he missed him, asked him when he would return, and gave him updates on how life was in Greenville. Captain Roark would respond and say that he wished to see his son but could see him in his imagination. He also told him to be his mother's protector in his absence. Roark's parents tried to be as well read as they could be to give their son the best education possible. Roark's father reportedly told him “Son, I want you to go where someone knows more than you do,” and always pushed him academically. M. J. Roark died at age 76 in Greenville, KY on October 22, 1908.

== Academics ==
Roark graduated from National Normal University of Lebanon in 1881 and in the following year he married his wife Mary Creegan Roark. Roark was a highly motivated student and wrote many essays. The essays and notes include titles such as, “Gladstone," "Explosives," "What is to be the next Craze?," "Mineral Kingdom," "Roman History," and "Outline of the Animal Kingdom." He took a job with the university and worked as a teacher while getting his Ph.D. He also did some post graduate work at Clark University in Worcester, Massachusetts. He then worked as the director of the normal department at the University of Kentucky. Roark was fascinated with the idea of normal schools and spent much time researching them. His book titled, Some Phases of the Internal Organization of State Normal Schools, examined 95 different normal schools and dissected the differences between them and other colleges and universities. It specifically looks at administrative differences. After gaining recognition for his passion and work regarding normal schools he was elected as the first president of then Eastern Kentucky State Normal School, now Eastern Kentucky University.

== Eastern Kentucky University ==
While at Eastern, Roark worked to expand and grow the school. Roark was a big force in the realm of university expansion. Roark and the board of EKU hired the Olmsted brothers to begin expanding current buildings and construct new ones. However, not a lot ever got accomplished. Roark said in a letter to the Olmsted brothers on September 16, 1908, that EKU was “having a little trouble with the state authorities” about their finances. The rest of the letters sent between the Olmsted brothers, Roark, and his representatives were about finances. Roark died in April 1909 and never got to see any of the Olmsted brothers work come to fruition.

Roark was also a part of the Sons of Revolution Kentucky Society until his death in 1909. The Sons of Revolution was a society founded after the American Revolution for those that served or were descendants of those who served. The yearbook talks a lot about his many accomplishments and acknowledges what a great educator and what a force he was for change in the educational arena. The yearbook also talks about how Roark was never bothered. It says that no matter what hardship came his way, whether that was inadequate funds, a lawsuit, or a small staff, he always had a smile on his face and was unfazed.

== Death and legacy ==
Roark died April 14, 1909. He was survived by his wife Mary Creegan Roark and his four children Creegan, Raymond, Eugene, and Kathleen. The board of regents selected his wife to act as the next university president in his absence. She initially was not considered a president of EKU but is now recognized as such. Later in 1909 the Ruric Roark Main Building now Roark Building, was named in his memory. The cornerstone of the Roark Building was laid on June 29, 1909. Governor Augustus E. Willson was the guest of honor and at the conclusion of the ceremony he deposited in the cornerstone a photograph of Dr. Roark.

The Roark building was constructed by C.C. Weber and members of his family in 1909. It is named after Ruric Nevel Roark, the first president of Eastern Kentucky University. The building was originally used as the first home of the Model Laboratory School at Eastern. It now belongs to Earth Sciences, Geography, and is the home to the office of the dean of the College of Arts and Social Sciences.
