= Mary Creegan Roark =

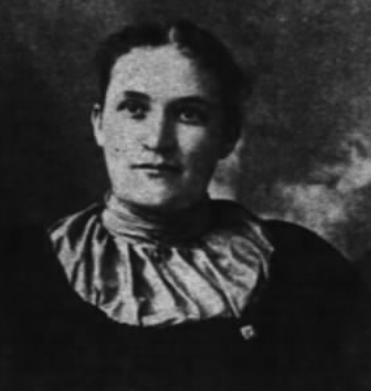

2nd President of Eastern Kentucky University (Note: On February 2, 2015, the Eastern Kentucky Board of Regents officially named Mary Roark the 2nd President of the university, removing the acting title from her tenure)
- In office April 16, 1909 – April 9, 1910
- Preceded by: Ruric Nevel Roark
- Succeeded by: John G. Crabbe

Personal details
- Born: September 1, 1861 Brighton, Iowa
- Died: February 1, 1922 (aged 60) Baltimore, Maryland
- Spouse: Ruric Nevel Roark (m. 1882)
- Education: National Normal University
- Occupation: Academic administrator

Mary Creegan Roark (September 1, 1861 – February 1, 1922) was the first female President and second President of Eastern Kentucky State Normal School, later Eastern Kentucky University, from April 1909 until March 1910. Roark held this position following the death of her husband, Ruric Nevel Roark, in 1909. Roark led the university at a time when women did not have the right to vote in state or federal elections. Roark was involved in the Suffrage Movement for Equal Rights and was elected Secretary of the Kentucky Equal Rights Association in 1898. Her stances included better teacher training and salaries, she also helped gain the right to vote in school elections. Roark died in Baltimore, Maryland on February 1, 1922 and is buried in Richmond, Kentucky at the Richmond Cemetery.

== Education ==
Roark attended the University of Nebraska, Oberlin College, and the National Normal University to obtain her Bachelor's of Science and Art and then her teaching certification from the National Normal University located in Lebanon, Ohio.

== Educational Leadership ==
She taught for four years at the National Normal University before she married a former student, Ruric Nevel Roark, on July 31, 1881. They then moved to Glasgow, Kentucky where they served as principal and vice-principal at the Normal School in Glasgow from 1885 until 1889.

== Political Office and Clubwork ==
They moved to Lexington, Kentucky where Ruric N. Roark was the new dean of the Normal School Department at the Kentucky State College (now University of Kentucky). They lived very near campus on South Limestone Street, and in 1895 she won a seat on the Lexington School Board for her ward in the first year that Lexington women could vote for that office. She started the Lexington chapter of the prestigious Sorosis woman's club, serving as its president for as long as she lived there. She was also a charter member of the Woman's Club of Central Kentucky founded in 1894. She was elected corresponding secretary for the Kentucky Equal Rights Association (KERA) in 1898, and continued there in various posts until 1911. She was elected chair of the Education Committee of the Kentucky Federation of Women's Clubs in 1902. In 1903 she chaired the committee that organized the Woman's Council for the Lexington Chautauqua program that summer.

== Eastern Kentucky University ==
In 1906 Ruric N. Roark was appointed as the first president of Eastern Kentucky Normal School, now known as Eastern Kentucky University. When he was diagnosed with brain cancer in April 1909, his wife Mary was then appointed as the first female president of the university until John Grant Crabbe, the Kentucky superintendent of public education at the time, took her position in March 1910. Crabbe was succeeded by Thomas Jackson Coates. Roark signed the diplomas of the first ever graduating class of EKU in 1909. After passing the torch of president, Mary became the Dean of Women at EKU and served until 1915, leaving due to health concerns. Enrollment at EKU increased 25% during Roark's tenure as she helped Appalachian students attend the college and established the all-female residence hall. On February 2, 2015, the Eastern Kentucky Board of Regents officially named Mary Roark the 2nd President of the university.

== Further accomplishments ==
- Taught four years at National Normal University
- Vice-president of Glasgow Normal School for three years
- Served on the Lexington, Kentucky school board
- Member of the State Education Commission for two years
- Written and read papers before the Southern Educational Association, State Educational Association and the Conference of Education in South
- Member of the National Educational Association Southern Educational Association
- Member of the Woman's Club
- Member of Suffrage Club
