= Autorité Portuaire Nationale =

Haitian Port district established in 1985

- Formation: 1985
- Type: Port district
- Headquarters: Boulevard La Saline
- Location: Port-au-Prince
- Region served: Haiti
- Director General: Jocelin Villier
- Website: Autorité Portuaire Nationale- Official Website

The Autorité Portuaire Nationale (APN) is a port district established in 1985 placed under the trusteeship of the secretariat of State of Finance of Economic Affairs. Its main office is located on boulevard la saline in downtown Port-au-Prince. APN manages and administers all ports of the Republic.

== History ==
The first port development in Port-au-Prince (Fort Islet) dates back to colonial times. In fact, it was backfilling a rocky reef, in order to provide for the establishment of a defense system for ships sheltered in the bay, to protect them against attack ships belonging to other powers, pirates and privateers plying the region. The first real port facilities date back to 1911. A narrow pier 610 m, flanked by a pier 183 meters long and 14.5 m wide and touching the southern flank of Fort Islet formed the basis of this early work. Various decrees to change as and when the status of the institution. That of 18 June 1973 makes it an autonomous body, the Port Authority of Port-au-Prince, able to manage other ports. Five years later, in 1978, a new name it is granted: the National Ports Authority under the supervision of the Secretary of State for Finance and Economic Affairs. The decree of March 15, 1985, gives the direction, control and operation of all ports of the Republic.

== Facilities ==
The Autorité Portuaire Nationale manages and maintains infrastructure critical to Haiti's marine trade and transportation network.

=== Seaports ===
The port authority operates the following seaports:

- Port international de Port-au-Prince
- Port international du Cap-Haïtien
- Port des Gonaives
- Port des Cayes
- Port de Jacmel
- Port de Jeremie
- Port de Fort-Liberte
- Port de Port-de-Paix
- Port de Saint-Marc
- Port de Miragoane
- Port de Corail
- Port d' Anse d'Hainault
- Port de Petit-Goave
- Port de Carries
- Port d' Anse a Galets
- Port des Baraderes
- Port de Port-a-Piment
- Port de Cite Soleil
- Port de La Saline
