= Joanne Glasser =

American educator and academic administrator (1950/1951–2026)

10th President of Bradley University
- In office August 7, 2007 – May 31, 2015
- Preceded by: David Broski
- Succeeded by: Gary R. Roberts

11th President of Eastern Kentucky University
- In office October 29, 2001 – August 7, 2007
- Preceded by: Bob Kustra
- Succeeded by: Charles D. Whitlock

Personal details
- Born: 1950 or 1951 Baltimore, Maryland, U.S.
- Died: June 22, 2026 (aged 75)
- Education: George Washington University (BA); University of Maryland Francis King Carey School of Law (JD)

Joanne Glasser (1950 or 1951 – June 22, 2026) was an American educator who was the president of Bradley University as well as Eastern Kentucky University. She was the first female president at both institutions and led successful capital campaigns for the universities.

== Early life ==
Glasser grew up in Baltimore, Maryland, where she used to see the Orioles play baseball with her father, which fostered her love for sports. Glasser was a cheerleader in her youth, as there were not many athletic opportunities for women. She had wanted to be a lawyer after reading To Kill a Mockingbird in school. While she was in high school, she worked for the Baltimore News-American. She went to college at George Washington University and received a political science degree, then went to law school at the University of Maryland School of Law to earn her juris doctor. She also received an Educational Management certificate from the Harvard Graduate School of Education.

== Career ==
After law school, she worked as an assistant county attorney, which led to her being Labor Commissioner for Baltimore County from 1980 to 1986. She took time off work to take care of her family and husband, who suffered a stroke. Glasser had a daughter who graduated from Duke University and a son who works as a graphic artist.

=== Towson University and Eastern Kentucky University ===
Glasser went to work for Towson University as an Affirmative Action officer from 1993 to 1995. From 1993 to 1999 she also worked as the executive assistant to the president of the university. She directed the first capital campaign at Towson which was worth $17.5 million. Glasser was given the Doc Minnegan Award for contributions to the athletics department at Towson. The director of athletics at Towson spoke to Glasser's contributions in getting a $3 million appropriation toward a stadium expansion as vice president of institutional advancement. She discovered her love for working in higher education and with students through her time at Towson and Eastern Kentucky University (EKU).

She was EKU's 10th president, starting October 2001 until August 2007. At EKU Glasser oversaw the construction of four new buildings and the planning of two others. She also launched the first comprehensive capital campaign in EKU's history. On December 3, 2008, Glasser announced that she had breast cancer. After treatment the cancer returned in December 2011. She received surgery in 2012 and was subsequently cancer-free.

=== Bradley University ===
Glasser became the president of Bradley University in August 2007. Glasser oversaw the capital campaign for Bradley University exceeding $150 million. She also oversaw the endowments for the engineering, chemistry, entrepreneurship, and sports communications departments. Glasser directed campus growth through new and improved structures like the Markin Center, a wellness facility, the Renaissance Coliseum, the Hayden-Clark Alumni Center, and Westlake Hall. The Alumni Center was created with input from alumni about the unique and engaging nature they wanted to create with the space. In 2014, Glasser was reported to be the highest-paid university president compared to similar universities. She was paid $618,436 based on 2012 reports. She described how she hopes she was a comfort to the hurting people on her first day being president, which was also the funeral of Danny Dahlquist, who had passed as the result of a fireworks-related accident inside his house, which was caused by others in an instance of alcohol misuse. She conducted the building of a committee for a Comprehensive Alcohol Action Plan to put effort into giving students needed alcohol education. Glasser planned to grow Bradley University graduate programs. Glasser stated that universities are not only to promote learning but also to promote compassion.

She was a Chair of the NCAA Division I Committee on Athletics Certification starting in 2010 as well as a member of the American Council on Education Task Force for Women and Minorities in Higher Education from 2010 to 2012.

Glasser announced her retirement from her presidency at Bradley University on May 21, 2015. Glasser described her mixed feelings about retirement because she had enjoyed her time with the university and the city but she recognized the time for a new president. Glasser wanted to be remembered as a president who worked for student engagement and success.

== Death ==
Glasser died on June 22, 2026, at the age of 75.
