= USS Gunston Hall (LSD-44) =

United States Navy amphibious assault ship

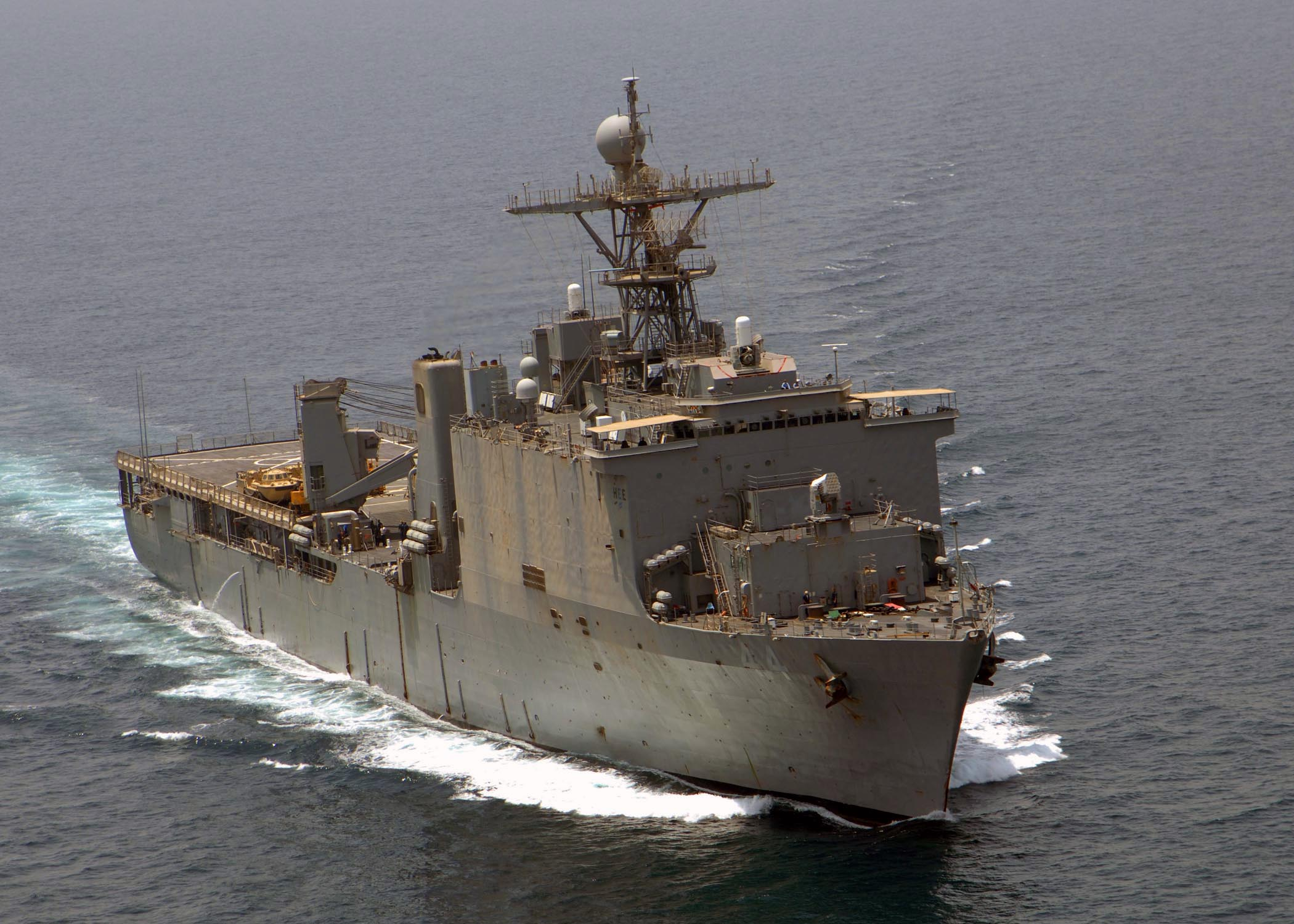
- USS Gunston Hall (LSD-44)

History

United States
- Name: Gunston Hall
- Namesake: Gunston Hall
- Awarded: 21 November 1983
- Builder: Avondale Shipyard
- Laid down: 26 May 1986
- Launched: 27 June 1987
- Commissioned: 22 April 1989
- Refit: 2009
- Home port: Joint Expeditionary Base Little Creek–Fort Story
- Identification: MMSI number: 368869000; Callsign: NGUN
- Motto: Defending The Constitution
- Status: in active service
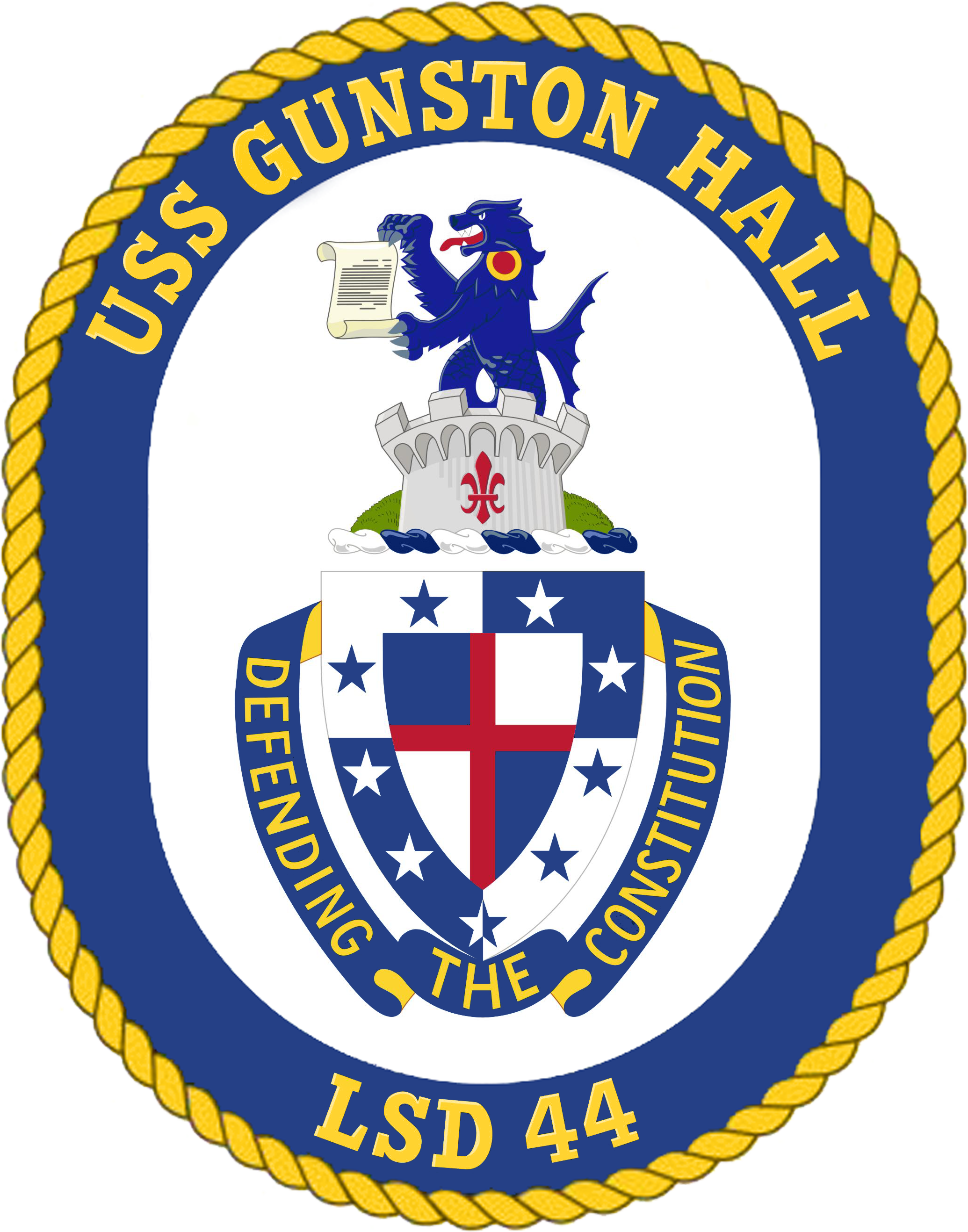
- Badge

General characteristics
- Class & type: Whidbey Island-class dock landing ship
- Displacement: 11,332 tons (light); 16,581 tons (full)
- Length: 610 ft (190 m) overall
- Beam: 84 ft (26 m)
- Draft: 21 ft (6.4 m)
- Propulsion: 4 Colt Industries, 16-cylinder diesel engines, 2 shafts, 33,000 shp (25,000 kW)
- Speed: over 20 knots (37 km/h; 23 mph)
- Boats & landing craft carried: 4 LCACs or 2 LCUs
- Troops: Marine detachment: 402 + 102 surge
- Complement: 22 officers, 391 enlisted
- Armament: 2 × 25 mm Mk 38 cannons; 2 × 20 mm Phalanx CIWS mounts; 2 × Rolling Airframe Missile; 6 × .50 caliber M2HB machine guns

USS Gunston Hall (LSD-44) is a Whidbey Island-class dock landing ship of the United States Navy. She was the second Navy ship to be named for Gunston Hall, the Mason Neck, Virginia, estate of George Mason, one of Virginia's Revolutionary figures, and "Father of the Bill of Rights". Gunston Hall was laid down on 26 May 1986, at the Avondale Shipyards, New Orleans. The ship was launched on 27 June 1987, commissioned on 22 April 1989 and assigned to Naval Amphibious Base Little Creek.

Gunston Hall is currently homeported at Joint Expeditionary Base Little Creek-Fort Story, Virginia, and assigned to Amphibious Group 2 of the Atlantic Fleet.

== Ship history ==
=== 1999 ===
Gunston Hall deployed as part of the USS Kearsarge amphibious ready group (ARG) on 14 April 1999 and returned to Hampton Roads on 14 October 1999, following a six-month deployment to the Mediterranean Sea. The other ships of the ARG were Kearsarge and Ponce, with 26th Marine Expeditionary Unit, Special Operations Capable (26 MEU(SOC)) and Amphibious Squadron (PHIBRON) 6 embarked. On 15 April 1999, Gunston Hall embarked K Company of 3/8 Marines with their assault amphibious vehicles in Morehead City, North Carolina.

Upon arrival on station in the Adriatic Sea to participate in Operation Allied Force and Joint Task Force (JTF) Shining Hope, the ARG deployed Marines from the 26 MEU(SOC) into Albania to construct a camp for refugees fleeing the fighting in Kosovo. Gunston Hall sailors conducted a pre-landing survey of the proposed landing beaches to assist in selection of the best landing sites. As the Serbs withdrew from Kosovo, the ARG conducted a rapid withdrawal of the MEU(SOC) and conducted a high-speed transit to Greece in order to again deploy the Marines ashore. An unopposed landing was conducted in Litokhoron, Greece to position the MEU(SOC) to enter Kosovo overland to provide an initial peacekeeping presence in the region, along with other NATO forces in Operation Joint Guardian. 26 MEU(SOC) spent 40 days in-country before the initial military technical agreements were finalized and more permanent security forces arrived. The ARG ships pulled into Thessaloniki, Greece, to backload the Marines and held a 'steel beach' cookout to celebrate their return.

After enjoying liberty in several Mediterranean ports, the ARG/MEU team was once again called into action, this time to provide relief and assistance to Turkey in Operation Avid Response in the wake of a devastating earthquake. Gunston Hall sailors participated in constructing a "tent city" to house thousands left homeless by the quake, and in the ARG/MEU deliveries of water and humanitarian supplies to many hard-to-reach sites within the country. Following that, Gunston Hall participated in Exercise Atlas Hinge to enhance at-sea and Marine interoperability with Tunisian forces.

=== 2006 ===
It was announced on 9 October 2006 in the Halifax Herald in Halifax, Nova Scotia, that the Canadian Navy would borrow the amphibious assault ship for a brief period, arriving at CFB Halifax in early November 2006. About 150 Canadian soldiers from CFB Valcartier, along with their light armored vehicles and G-wagons, boarded the vessel and to train to storm beaches in landing craft. The U.S. military provided mentoring and support during the operation.

=== 2008 ===
While on deployment Gunston Hall engaged and gave chase to the tanker Golden Nori which had been hijacked by Somalian pirates. After days of chasing, Golden Nori was cornered in a Somali bay where USS Whidbey Island assisted with the extraction of the hostages.

In July 2008, Gunston Hall underwent a midlife modernization availability at Metro Machine Corp. in Norfolk, Virginia, which included major upgrades to the ship's control system, local area network and machinery control system, propulsion systems, air conditioning system, as well as replacement of the ship's boilers and evaporators with an all-electric services system. The refit extended her expected service life which could be up until 2038. She completed subsequent sea trials on 21 May 2009.

=== 2010 ===
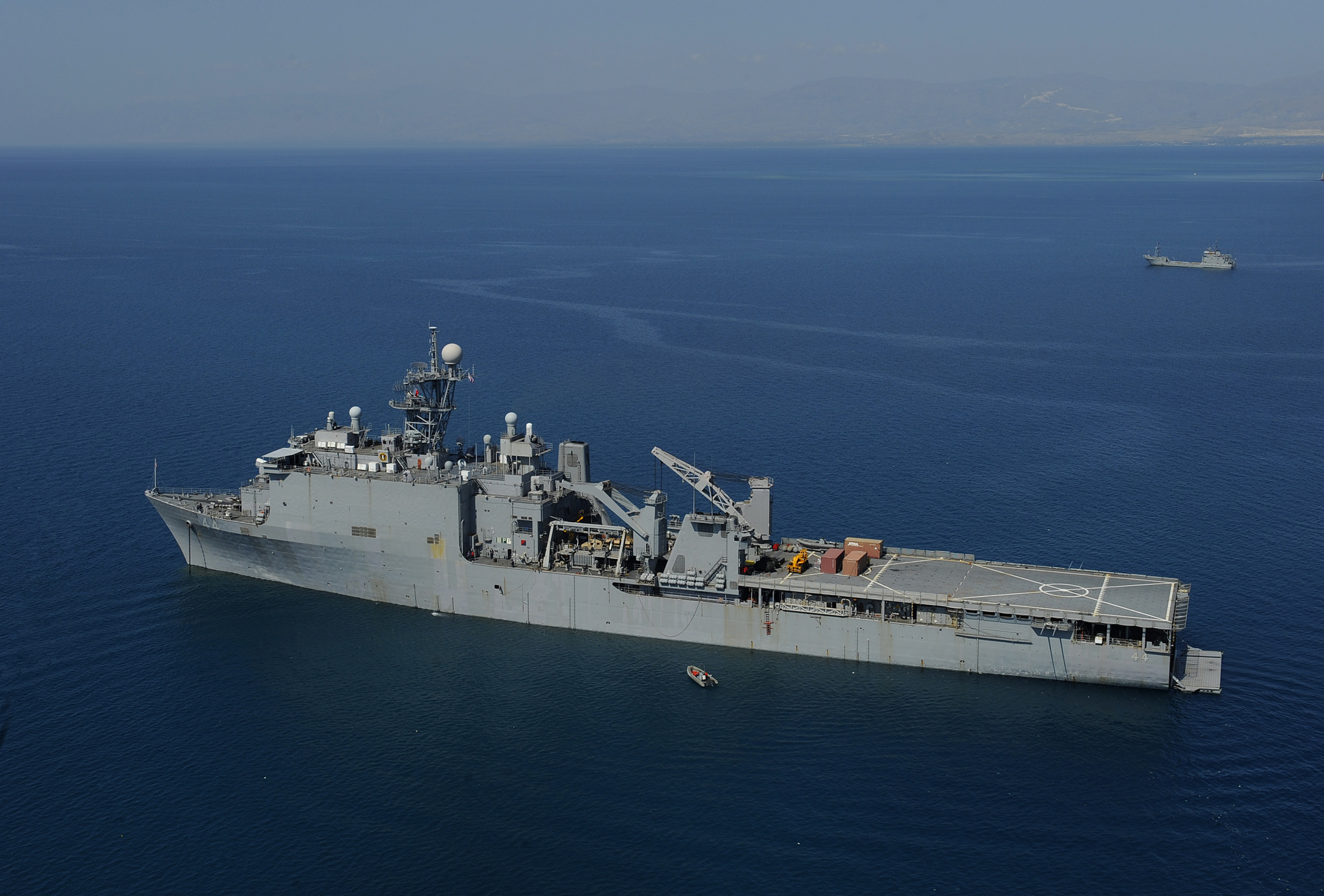
Gunston Hall off the coast of Haiti during Operation Unified Response following the 2010 Haiti earthquake

Gunston Hall was deployed in January 2010 as part of rescue efforts after the 2010 Haiti earthquake. On 18 January 2010, she anchored off Killick Navy Base and started relief operations.

In August 2010, after allegations of sexual harassment and simple assault among the ship's crew surfaced, her commanding officer was relieved of his command by Rear Admiral Dave Thomas, commander of Naval Surface Force Atlantic, while the ship's executive officer and former Command Master Chief were given non-judicial actions over the same incident.

=== 2011 ===
In 2011 Gunston Hall participated in "Amphibious-Southern Partnership Station 2011", during a two-month deployment to the U.S. Southern Command Area of Responsibility, with stops in Belize, Colombia and Guatemala. Embarked with Gunston Hall was a U.S. Marines Theater Security Cooperation Task Force composed of multiple Marine Corps units, and the staff element of Destroyer Squadron 40. The sailors and Marines conducted subject matter expert exchanges with partner nations and gave out gifts to needy children at their port visits.

=== 2015 ===
Gunston Hall experienced an onboard fire on 3 March 2015 while the ship was undergoing a maintenance availability in Portsmouth, Virginia. The Portsmouth Fire Department responded, and the fire was extinguished approximately three hours later.

=== 2018 ===
After completing the Board of Inspection and Survey in May, Gunston Hall departed Joint Expeditionary Base Little Creek–Fort Story on 18 June 2018 to participate in naval exercises Southern Seas 2018 and UNITAS 2018. The ship completed multiple port calls to Naval Station Mayport, Florida, Guantanamo Bay Naval Base, Cuba, Roatán, Honduras, Port of Spain, Trinidad and Tobago, Santa Marta, Colombia and Cartagena, Colombia. After a brief return to Little Creek–Fort Story in order to resupply and embark the 22nd Marine Expeditionary Unit, she departed for Reykjavik, Iceland, along with New York and Iwo Jima, to participate in Exercise Trident Juncture 2018. After a port call in Portsmouth, England, the ship returned home on 4 December 2018.

=== 2020 ===
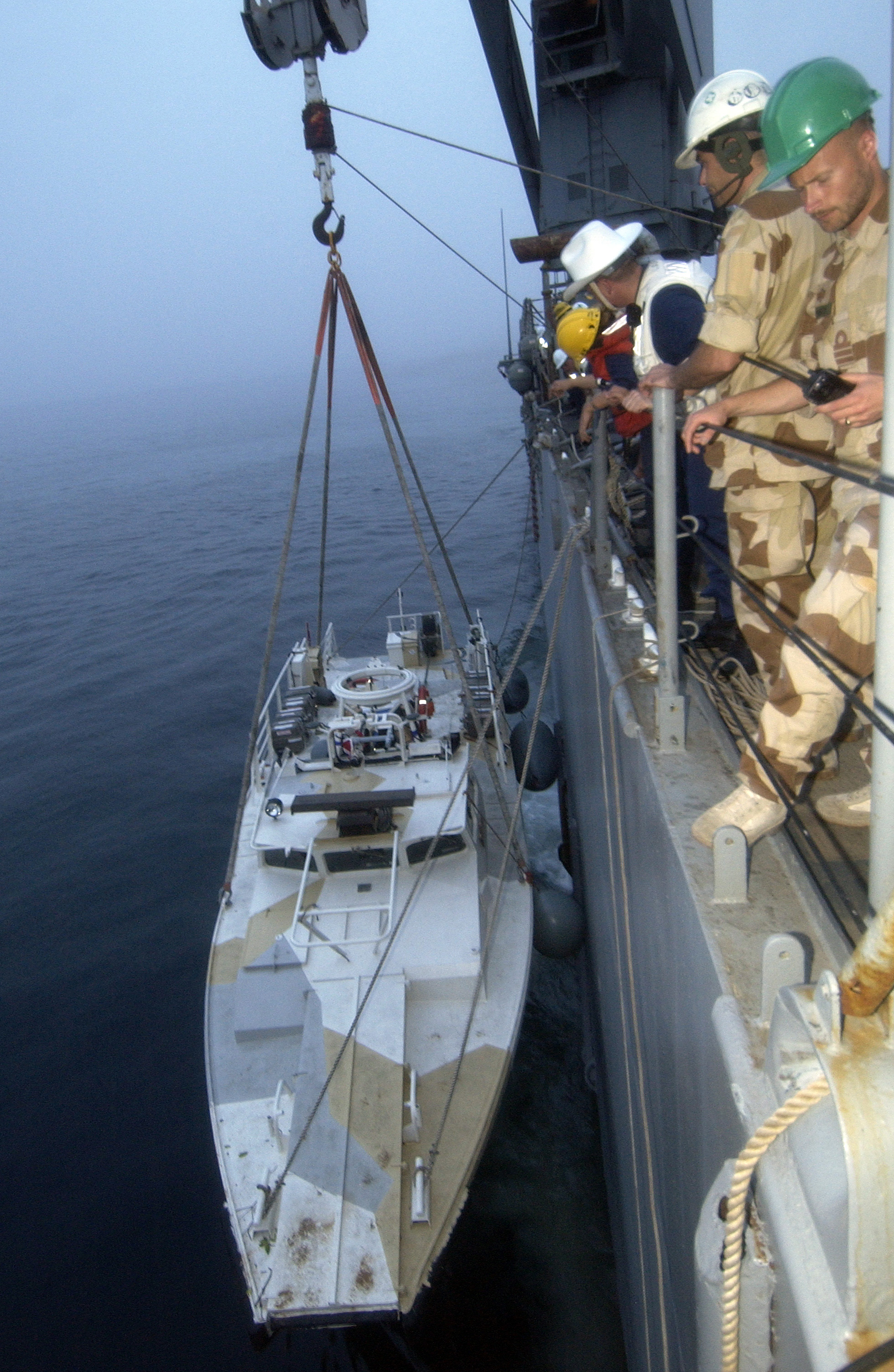
U.S. and Royal Norwegian Navy personnel monitor a Norwegian S90N combat boat as it is lifted aboard Gunston Hall

In December 2020 the U.S. Navy's Report to Congress on the Annual Long-Range Plan for Construction of Naval Vessels stated that the ship was planned to be placed out of commission in reserve in 2023.

=== 2022 ===
On 13 May 2022, Gunston Hall took part in a PASSEX training with the Finnish and Swedish navies in the northern Baltic Sea, and in June she took part in the BALTOPS 2022 exercise.
