= Ken Keen =

United States Army general

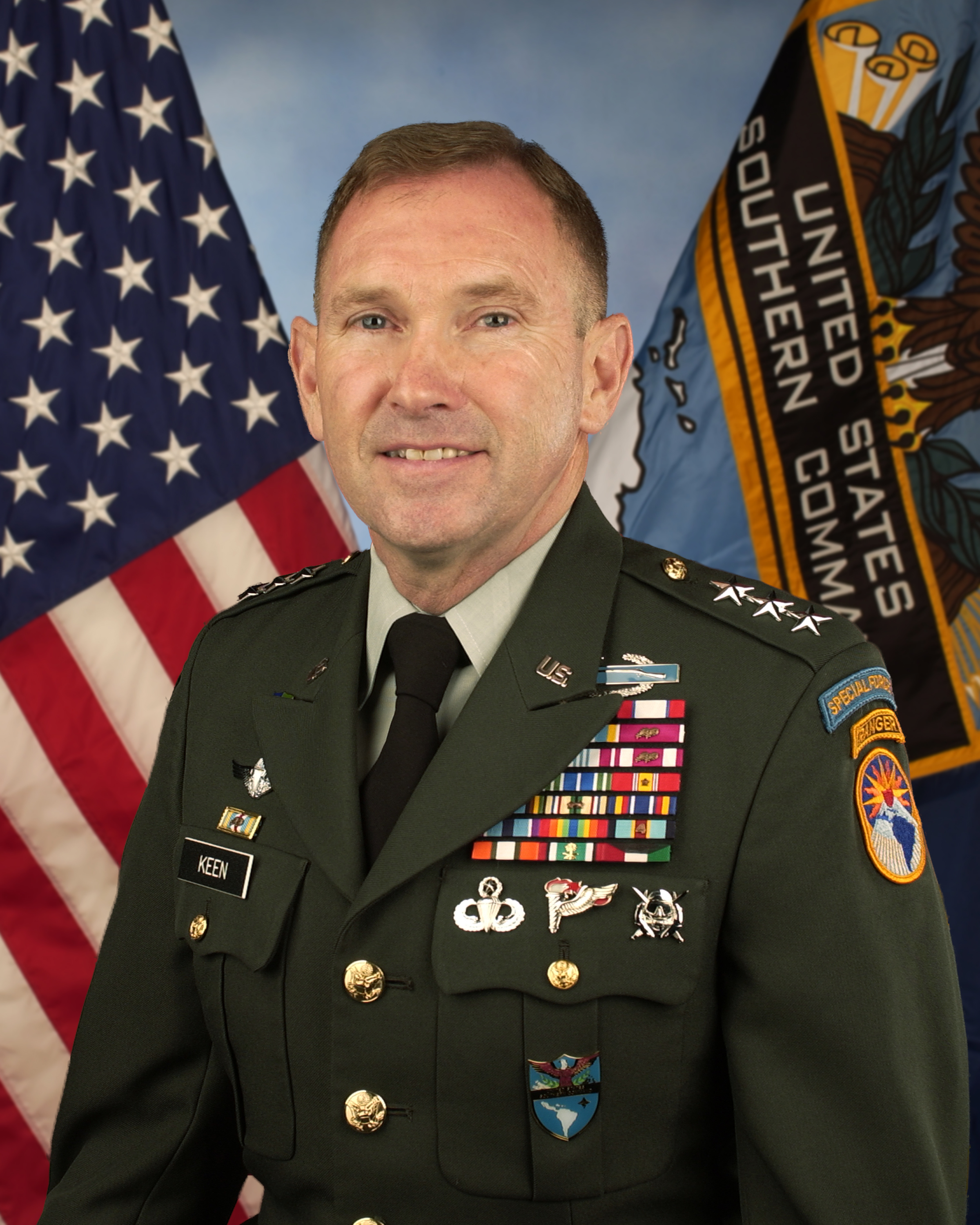
- Lieutenant General Ken Keen in 2009
- Born: July 1952 (age 74)
- Military career
- Allegiance: United States
- Branch: United States Army
- Service years: 1974–2013
- Rank: Lieutenant General
- Nickname: Ken
- Commands: Operation Unified Response; United States Army South; United States Military Group Bogota; 75th Ranger Regiment; 1st Battalion, 75th Ranger Regiment
- Conflicts: United States invasion of Panama; Gulf War; Operation Unified Response
- Awards: Army Distinguished Service Medal; Defense Superior Service Medal (3); Legion of Merit (3)

Purl Kenneth Keen (born July 1952) is a retired United States Army officer. He last served as the commander of the Office of the Defense Representative, U.S. Embassy Pakistan and before that served as Military Deputy Commander of United States Southern Command.

== Early life and education ==
Keen is a native of Hyden, Kentucky. He graduated from Eastern Kentucky University in 1974 with a Bachelor of Science in mathematics. He later earned a Master of Arts in Latin American studies from the University of Florida. Keen also studied at the Brazilian Army Command and General Staff College and the United States Army War College.

== Military career ==
An Infantry officer with 18 years on airborne status, Keen has commanded Light Airborne Infantry, Ranger, Special Forces, Military Group and Army Component units. His commands include a Special Forces Detachment (SCUBA) in 3rd Battalion, 7th Special Forces Group; Company and Battalion Commands in the 82nd Airborne Division; Command of 1st Battalion, 75th Ranger Regiment; Command of the 75th Ranger Regiment; Command of United States Military Group Bogota, Colombia; Command of United States Army South (USARSO); and Command of Joint Task Force Haiti – Operation Unified Response.

Keen participated in Operation Just Cause as the Assistant S3 of the 75th Ranger Regiment and was Commander, Ranger Task Force during Operation Desert Storm as part of Joint Special Operations Command.

From September 2007 to September 2009, he served as the Director of the United States European Command Plans and Operations Center and the EUCOM Chief of Staff.

Keen is now a professor and the Associate Dean of Leadership Development at Emory University's Goizueta School of Business in Atlanta, Georgia.

== Awards and decorations ==
Combat Infantryman Badge
Expert Infantryman Badge
Master Parachutist Badge
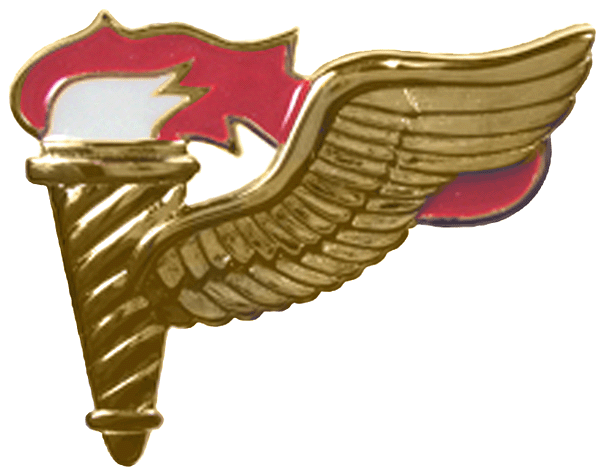
Pathfinder Badge
Ranger tab
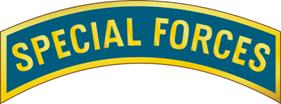
Special Forces Tab
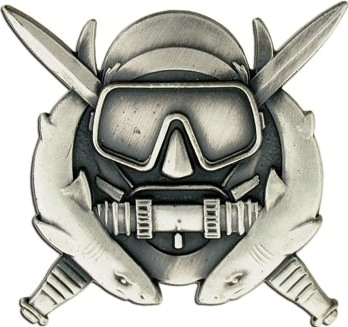
Special Operations Diver Badge
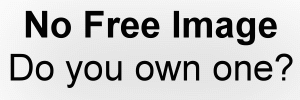
Brazilian Army Parachutist Badge
United States Southern Command Identification Badge
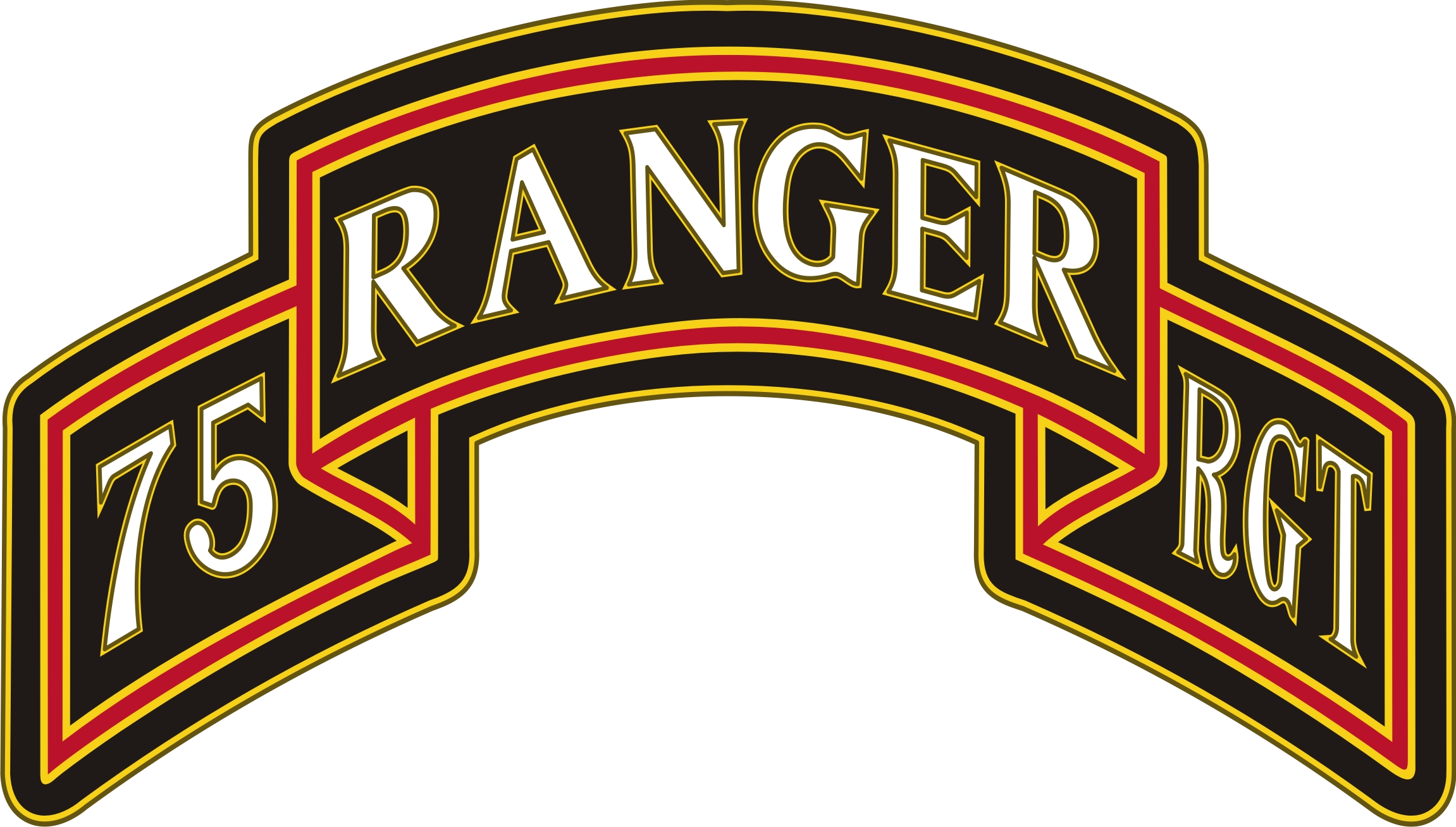
75th Ranger Regiment Combat Service Identification Badge
75th Ranger Regiment Distinctive Unit Insignia

Army Distinguished Service Medal
Defense Superior Service Medal with two bronze oak leaf clusters
Legion of Merit with two oak leaf clusters
Defense Meritorious Service Medal
Meritorious Service Medal with two oak leaf clusters
Army Commendation Medal
Army Achievement Medal
Joint Meritorious Unit Award with two oak leaf clusters
National Defense Service Medal with one bronze service star
Armed Forces Expeditionary Medal
Southwest Asia Service Medal with two campaign stars
Global War on Terrorism Service Medal
Humanitarian Service Medal
Army Service Ribbon
Army Overseas Service Ribbon with bronze award numeral 4
Multinational Force and Observers Medal
Kuwait Liberation Medal (Saudi Arabia)
Kuwait Liberation Medal (Kuwait)

Military offices
Preceded by Stanley A. McChrystal	Commander, 75th Ranger Regiment; 1999–2001	Succeeded by Joseph Votel
Preceded by ???	Military Deputy Commander of the United States Southern Command; 201?–2011	Succeeded by Joseph D. Kernan
