= Eastern Kentucky University =

Public university in Richmond, Kentucky, US

Coordinates: 37°44′2.9562″N 84°18′5.1631″W

- Former names: Eastern Kentucky State Normal School No. 1 (1906–1922); Eastern Kentucky State Normal School and Teachers College (1922–1930); Eastern Kentucky State Teachers College (1930–1948); Eastern Kentucky State College (1948–1966)
- Type: Public university
- Established: 1874; 152 years ago (predecessor college); 1906; 120 years ago (current institution)
- Academic affiliations: Space-grant
- Endowment: $107 million (2025)
- President: David McFaddin
- Provost: Sara Zeigler
- Faculty: 563 full-time (spring 2022) and 410 part-time (spring 2022)
- Administrative staff: 1,554 full-time
- Students: 15,673 (fall 2024)
- Undergraduates: 13,448 (fall 2024)
- Postgraduates: 2,225 (fall 2024)
- Location: Richmond, Kentucky, United States
- Colors: Maroon and White
- Nickname: Colonels
- Sporting affiliations: NCAA Division I - FCS; ASUN; UAC
- Mascot: Colonels
- Website: www.eku.edu

Eastern Kentucky University (Eastern or EKU) is a public university in Richmond, Kentucky, United States. It also maintains branch campuses in Corbin, Hazard, and Manchester and offers over 40 online undergraduate and graduate options.

== History ==
=== Founding ===
On March 21, 1906, Governor J. C. W. Beckham signed legislation which established the Eastern Kentucky State Normal School No. 1. On May 7, 1906, the Normal School Commission selected the site of the former Central University campus as the location of this new college; EKU remains at this location today.

=== Renaming ===
In 1922, the Eastern Kentucky State Normal School No. 1 changed its name to Eastern Kentucky State Normal School and Teachers College, and the transformed college awarded its first degrees under that name in 1925. In 1930, the college changed its name again, becoming the Eastern Kentucky State Teachers College. In 1948, the General Assembly shortened it to Eastern Kentucky State College. In 1966, it was officially renamed Eastern Kentucky University.

=== Campus revitalization ===
The years between 2012 and 2020 were marked by a building campaign that altered the campus layout and improved aesthetics. Funding for the multimillion-dollar project relied heavily on public-private partnerships (P3) under the leadership of then-President Michael T. Benson. The construction efforts mark the most significant period of campus facility development since President Robert R. Martin's tenure in the 1960s. Among the renovations and additions are:

- Powell Student Center (2019–20)
- New Rec Center (2019–20)
- Case Dining Hall (2018)
- New Gertrude Hood Stadium (Softball Field) (2017)
- Scholar House (2017)
- Turner Gate (2016)
- John Grant Crabbe Main Library's Noel Reading Porch (2015)
- Lancaster Avenue Pedway (2015/2017)
- 1971 Verdin Carillon bells (Keen Johnson Building) (2014)
- New Science Building (Phase I) (2012)

=== Presidents ===
Presidents of the institution have included:

No.	Image	President	Term
1		Ruric Nevel Roark	1906–1909
2		Mary Creegan Roark	1909–1910
3		John Grant Crabbe	1910–1916
4		Thomas J. Coates	1916–1928
-		Homer Cooper (interim)	1928
5		Herman L. Donovan	1928–1941
6		William F. O'Donnell	1941–1960
7		Robert R. Martin	1960–1976
-		Julius Cherry Powell (interim)	1975–1976
8		Julius Cherry Powell	1976–1984
9		Hanley Funderburk	1984–1998
10		Bob Kustra	1998–2001
-		Eugene Hughes (interim)	2001
11		Joanne Glasser	2001–2007
-		Charles D. Whitlock (interim)	2007–2008
12		Charles D. Whitlock	2008–2013
13		Michael T. Benson	2013–2020
-		David T. McFaddin (interim)	2020
14		David T. McFaddin	2020–present

== Academics ==
=== Rankings ===
Academic rankings

National
- U.S. News & World Report: 329 (tie)

Undergraduate demographics as of Fall 2023
Race and ethnicity	Total
White	80%
Black	7%
Hispanic	6%
Two or more races	5%
Asian	1%
International student	1%
Unknown	1%
Economic diversity
Low-income (Note: The percentage of students who received an income-based federal Pell grant intended for low-income students.)	41%
Affluent (Note: The percentage of students who are a part of the American middle class at the bare minimum.)	59%

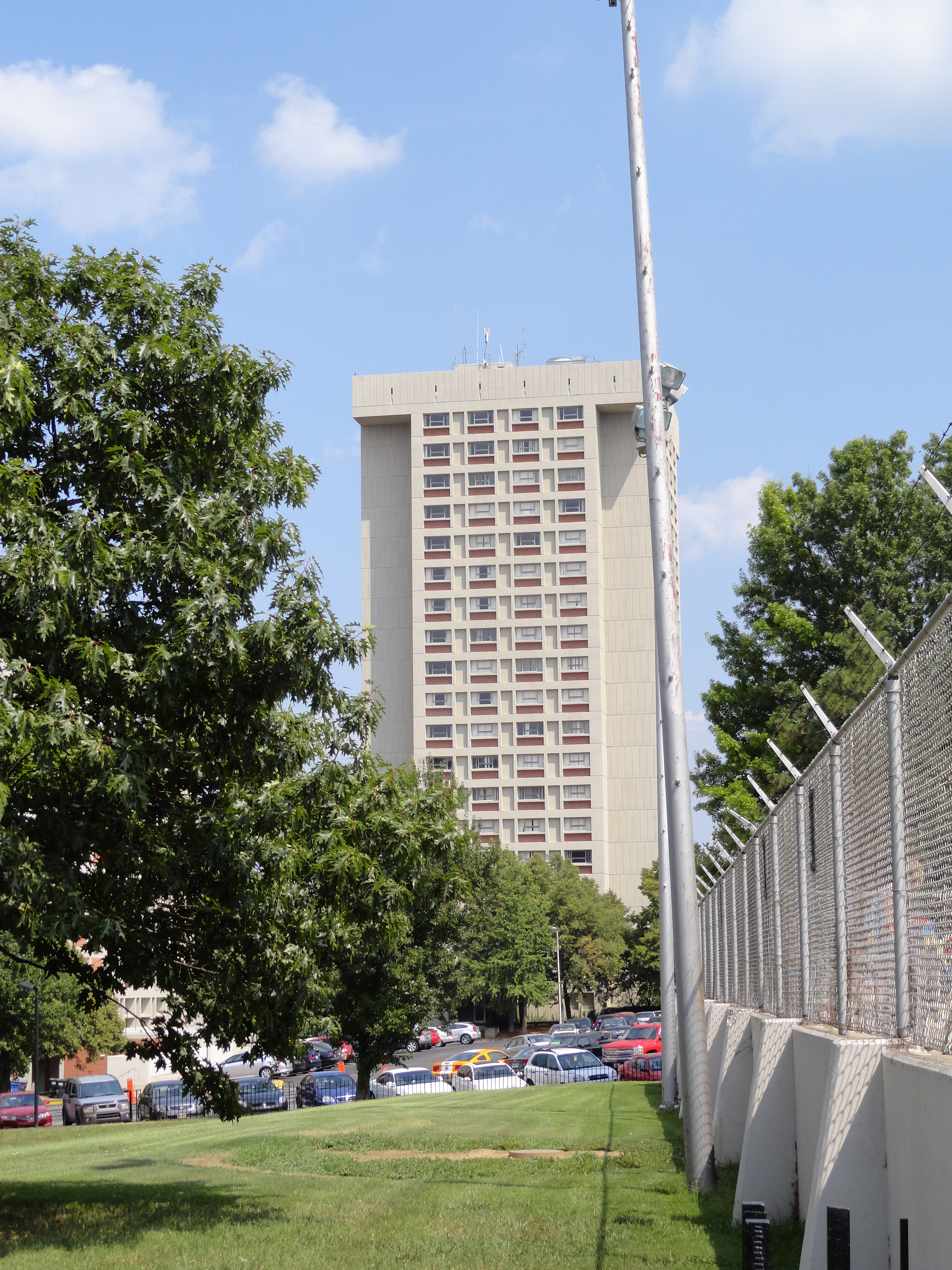
Commonwealth Hall at Eastern Kentucky University in 2011

=== Accreditation and academic charge ===
The university is accredited by the Southern Association of Colleges and Schools. In 2010, the university awarded its first doctoral degree through its Educational Leadership and Policy Studies program.

EKU serves its service region by offering adult degree completion options and online degree programs in addition to its traditional on-campus offerings.

=== Rankings and outcomes ===
Eastern Kentucky University has achieved national recognition, including recently by the U.S. News & World Report 2022 rankings:

- #52 (tie) in Regional Universities South (51st in 2021)
- #29 Best Graduate School – Occupational Therapy (29th in 2021)
- #170 (tie) Best Graduate School – Public Affairs (166th in 2021)
- #189 Best Graduate School – Speech-Language Pathology (189th in 2021)
- #74 (tie) Best Online Bachelor's Programs (58th in 2021)
- #24 Best Colleges for Veterans (32nd in 2021)

EKU was also ranked by the 2019 Forbes Magazine America's Top Colleges:

- #641 Top Colleges (637 in 2017 and 647 in 2018)
- #248 in Public Colleges (249 in 2017 and 250 in 2018)
- #160 in the South (172 in 2017 and 167 in 2018)

According to 2022 data from College Scorecard, Eastern Kentucky University graduates earn a median salary of $42,000 ten years after their entry into the institution. The median salaries of graduates vary across disciplines, with criminal justice majors earning around $33,000, biology $40,000, psychology $35,000, nursing $65,000, and Computer and Information Science $72,000. 61% of EKU graduates earn higher than a typical high school graduate of the corresponding area.

=== Honors program ===
In 1987, the faculty senate voted to approve an honors program to attract high-achieving students primarily from Kentucky with approval coming from the board of regents the following year. The first 34 students entered the program in 1988.

== Athletics ==
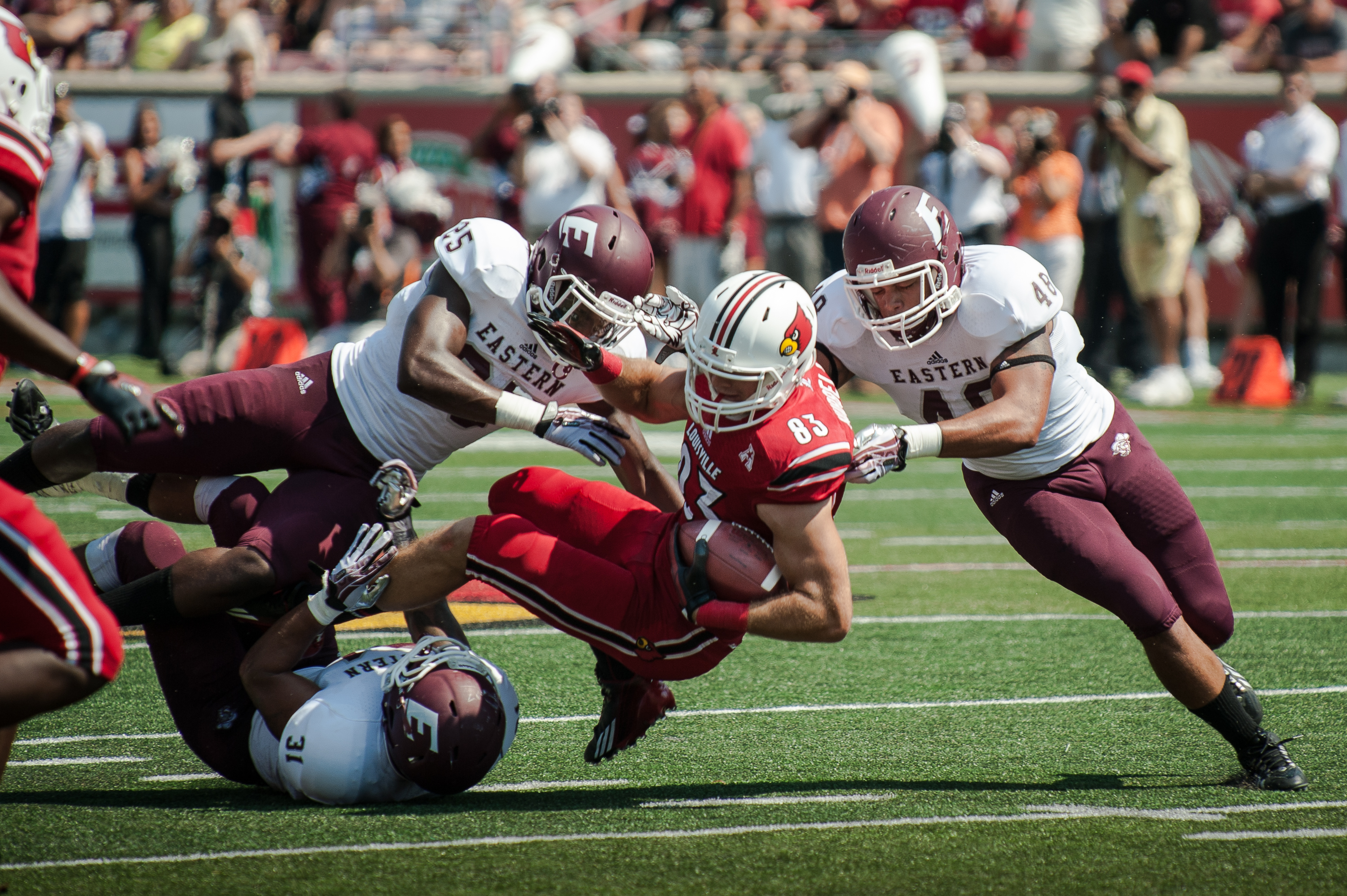
The EKU football team playing against the University of Louisville in 2013

The Eastern Kentucky (EKU) athletic teams are called the Colonels (formerly known as the "Maroons" until the mid-1960s). The university is a member of the NCAA Division I ranks, primarily competing in the ASUN Conference since the 2021–22 academic year; while its football team competes in the United Athletic Conference (UAC), with the conference having aspirations to go to the FBS level. The Colonels previously competed in the Ohio Valley Conference (OVC) from 1948–49 to 2020–21. EKU competes in 18 intercollegiate varsity sports: Men's sports include baseball, basketball, cross country, football, golf, tennis, and track & field; while women's sports include basketball, beach volleyball, cross country, golf, soccer, softball, tennis, track & field and volleyball.

== Media ==
=== WEKU ===
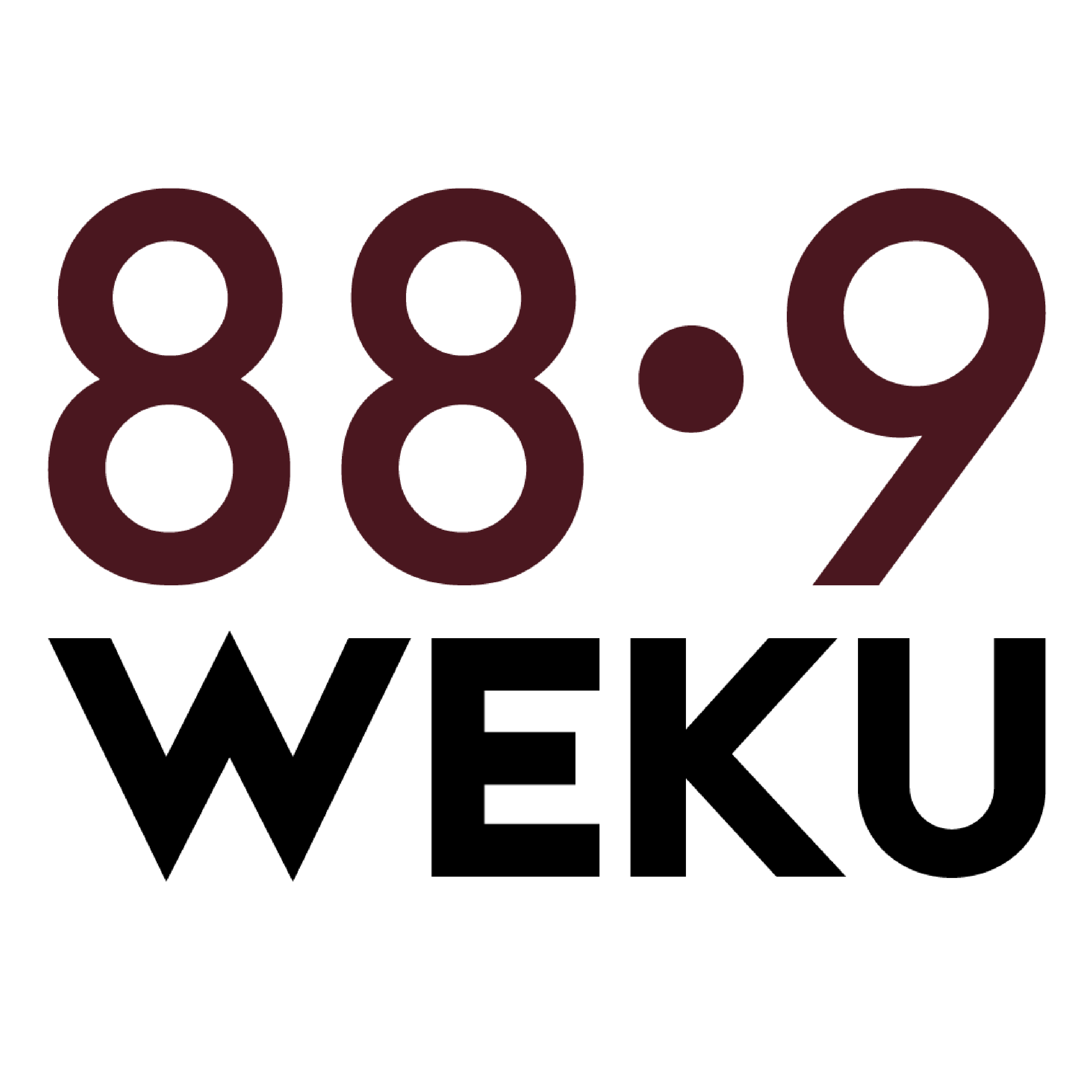

Launched in 1968, WEKU is a charter member of the educational radio network, National Public Radio (NPR). WEKU features NPR news and talk programming in addition to locally produced news, arts and cultural programming.

WEKU broadcasts across nine FM stations in Central and Eastern Kentucky:

- 88.9 FM Richmond /Lexington
- 90.9 FM Hazard
- 88.5 FM Corbin
- 90.1 FM Pineville
- 106.7 FM Frankfort
- 96.3 FM Harlan
- 96.9 FM Barbourville
- 95.1 FM Pikeville
- 102.5 FM Middlesboro

=== The Eastern Progress ===
The Eastern Progress is the student-run media network at Eastern Kentucky University founded in 1922. The Eastern Progress produces a monthly print edition, online content, videos, photos, and podcasts. The Progress is housed in the School of Communication.

== Notable alumni ==
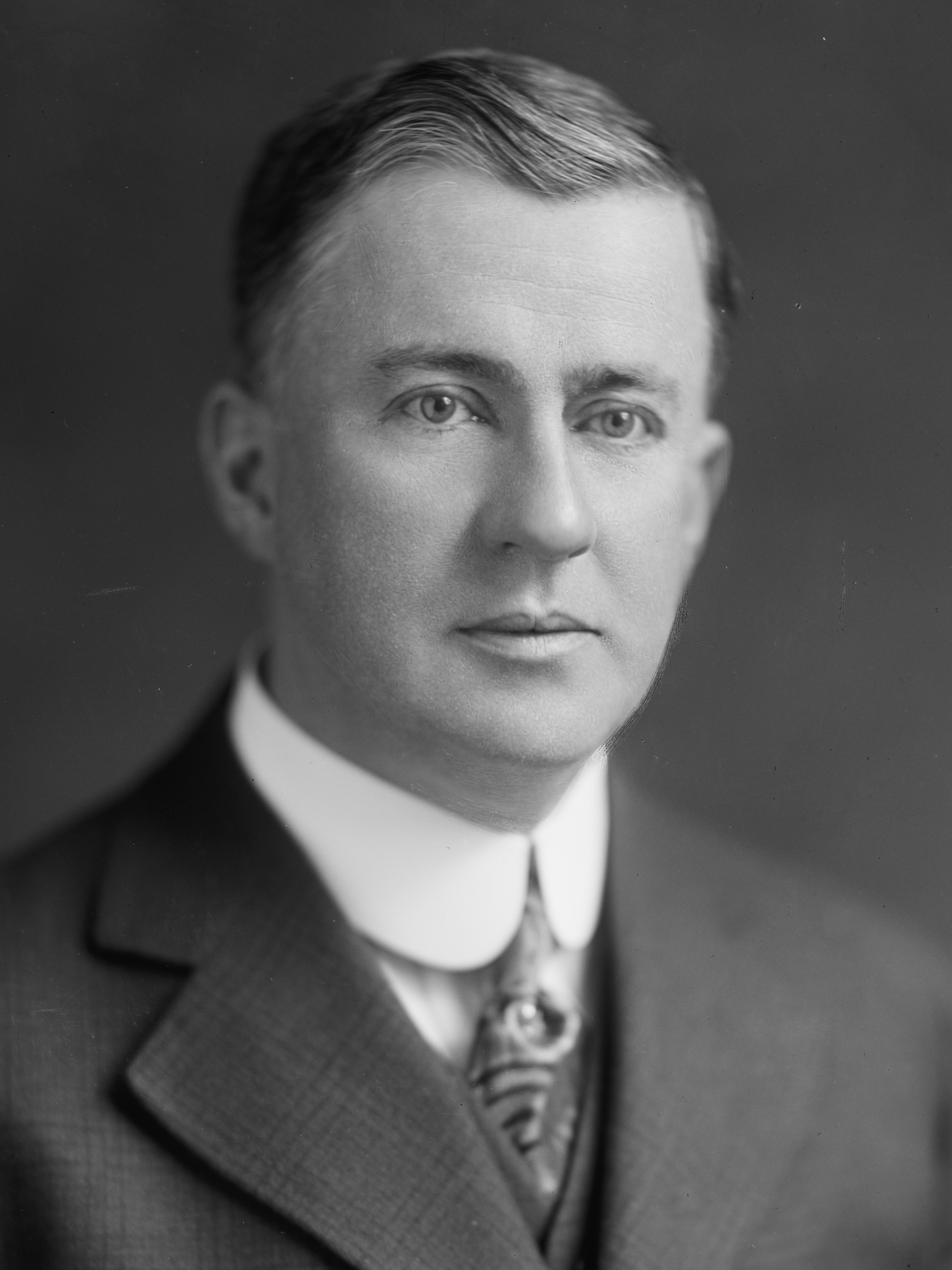
J. C. W. Beckham, governor of Kentucky and U.S. senator

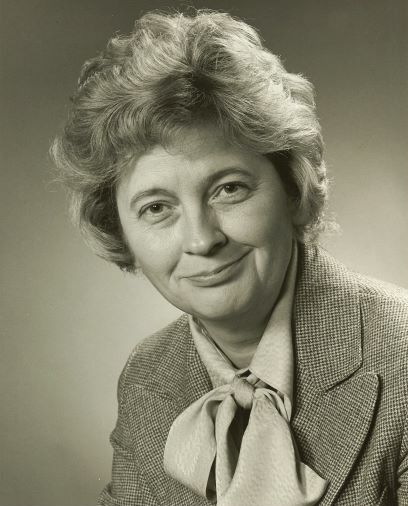
Eula Bingham, Assistant Secretary of Labor for Occupational Safety and Health Administration

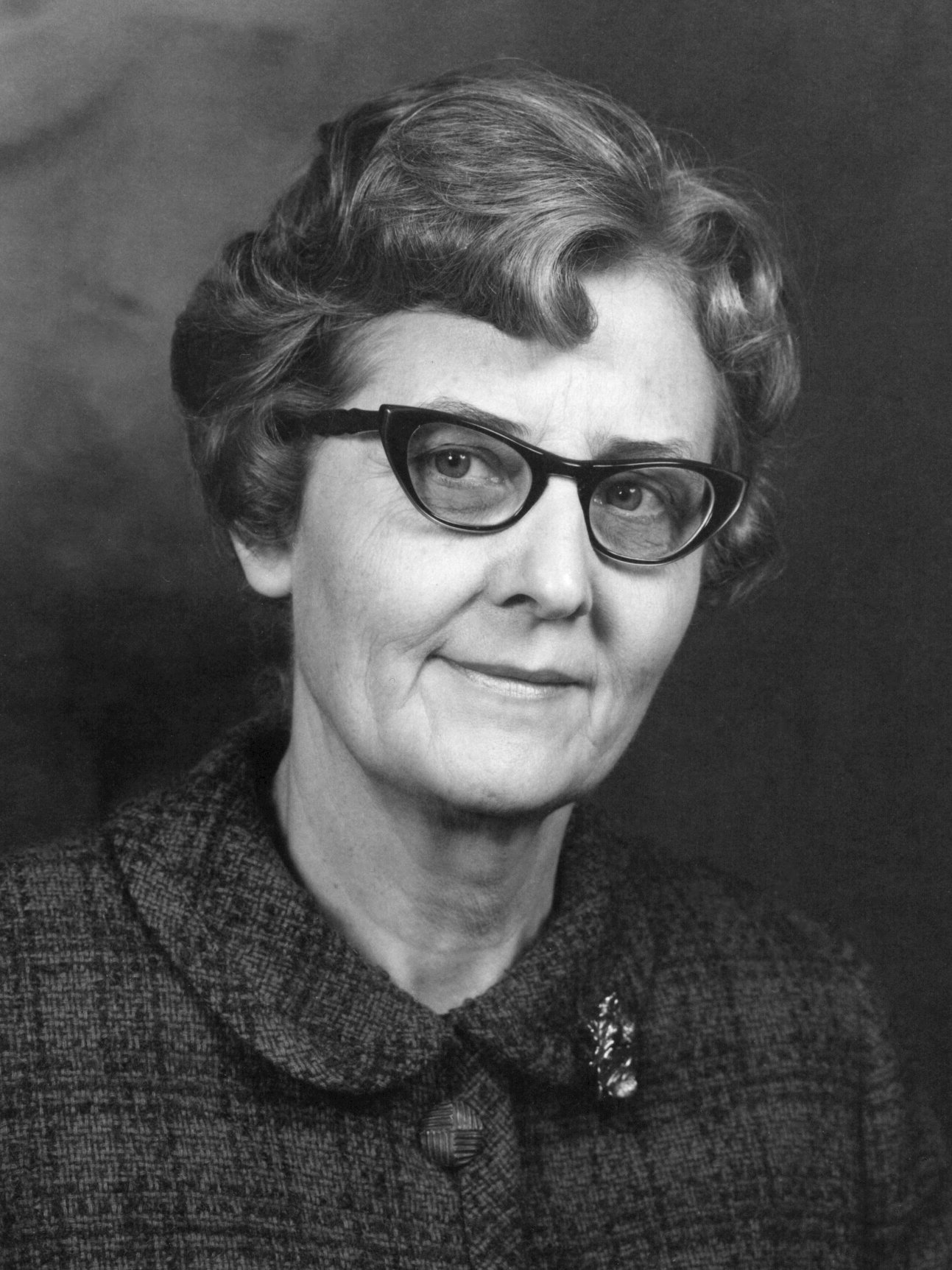
Leila Feltner Begley, former Secretary of State of Kentucky

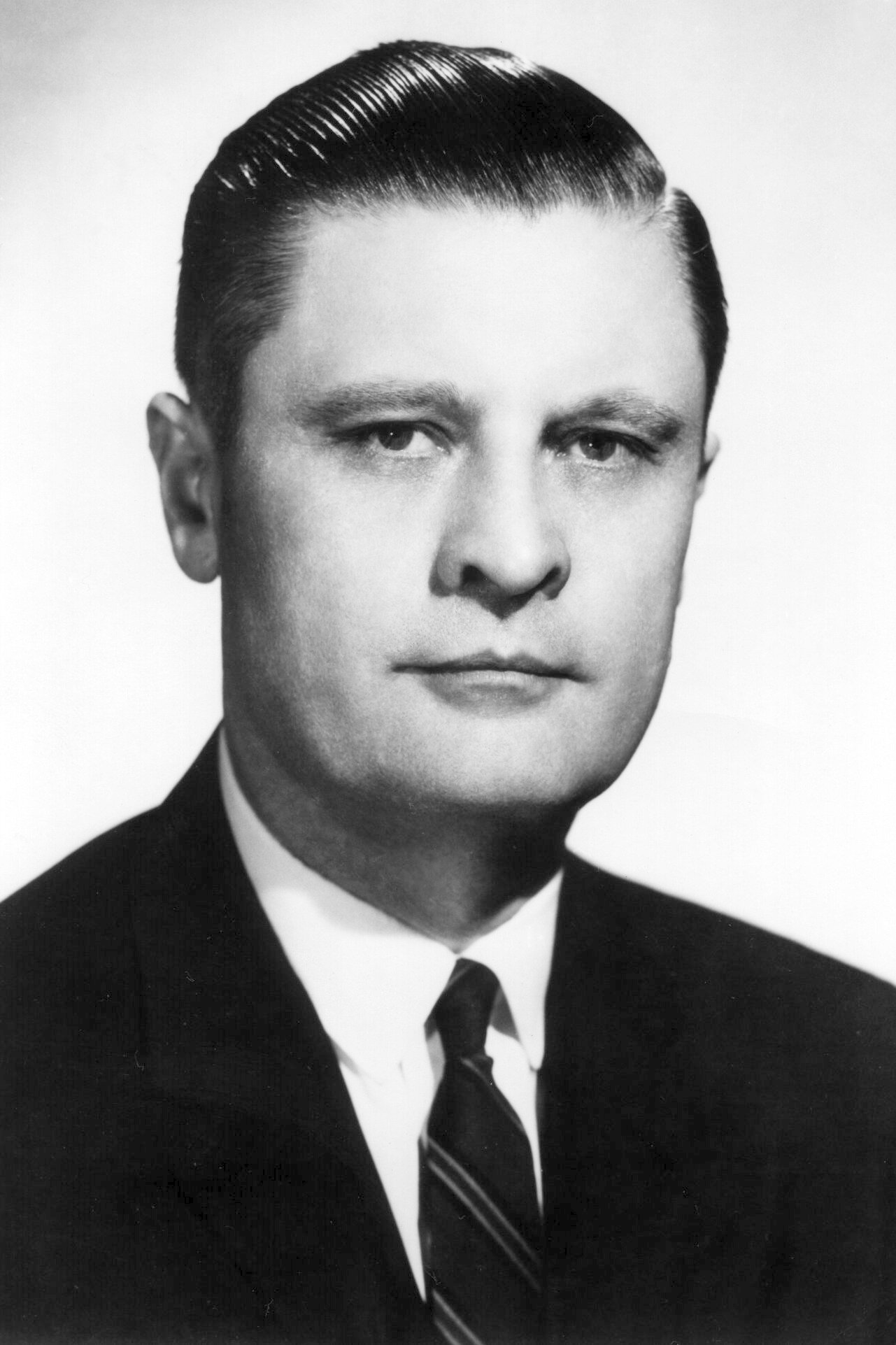
Elmer Begley, former Secretary of State of Kentucky

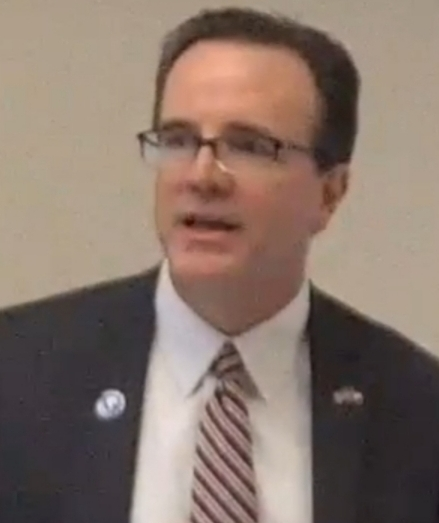
Mike Harmon, former Kentucky Auditor of Public Accounts

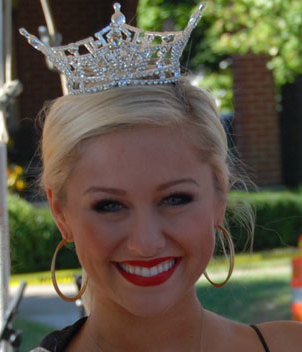
Mallory Ervin, Miss Kentucky 2009

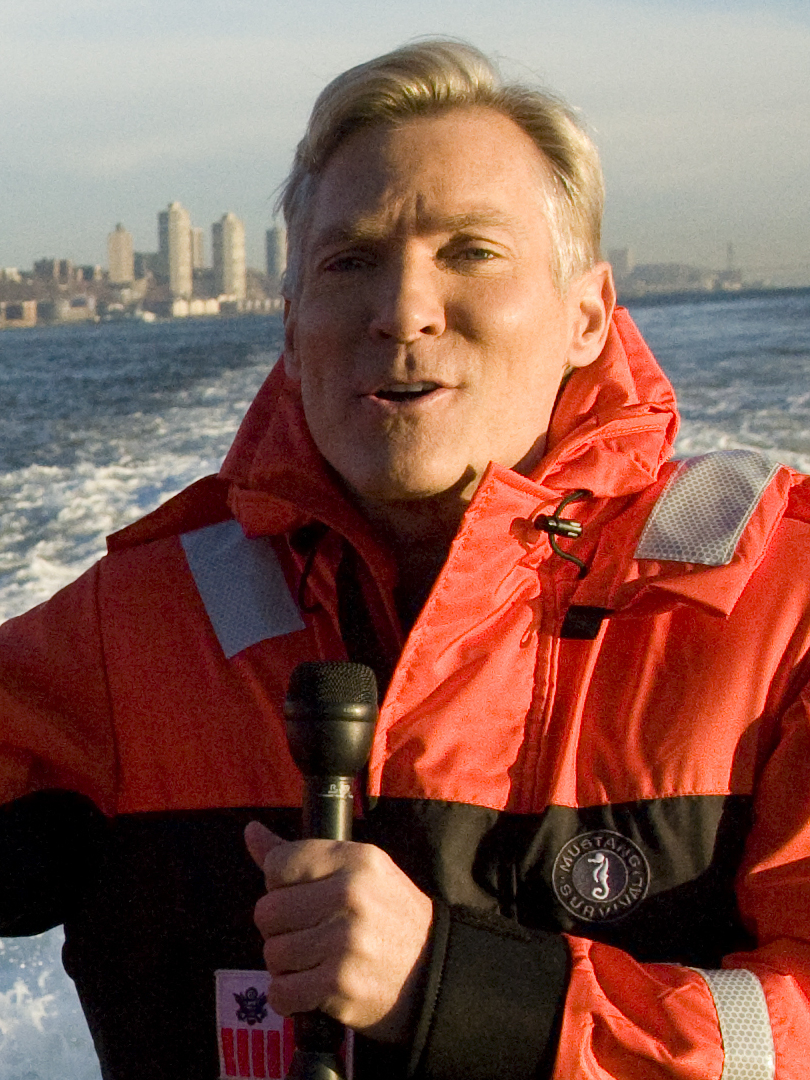
Sam Champion, weather anchor

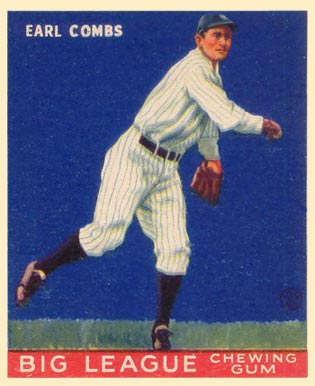
Earle Combs, MLB Hall of Fame, New York Yankees

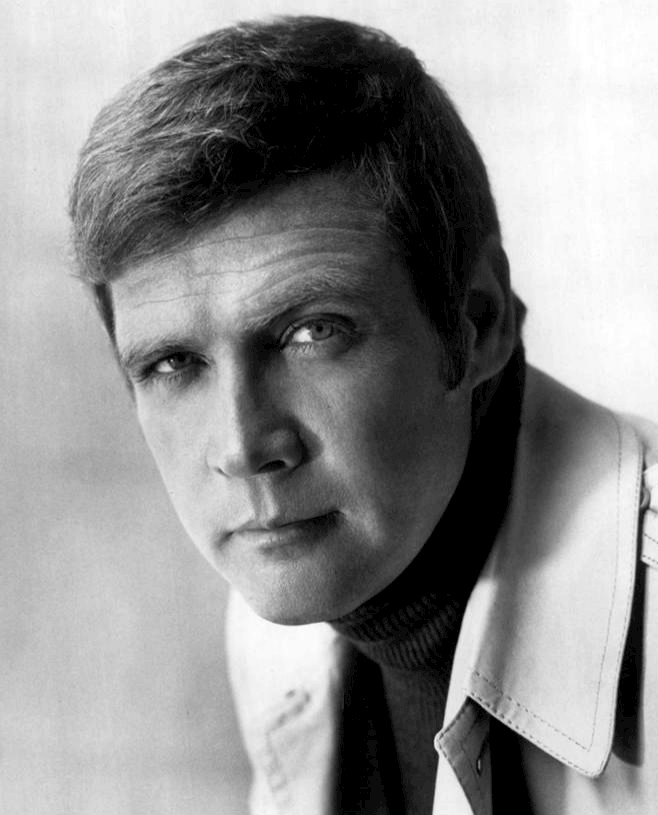
Lee Majors, Actor, The Six Million Dollar Man

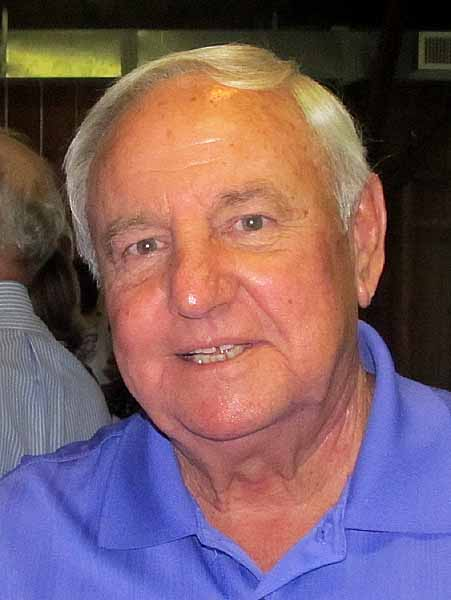
Roy Kidd, College Football Coach, College Football Hall of Fame

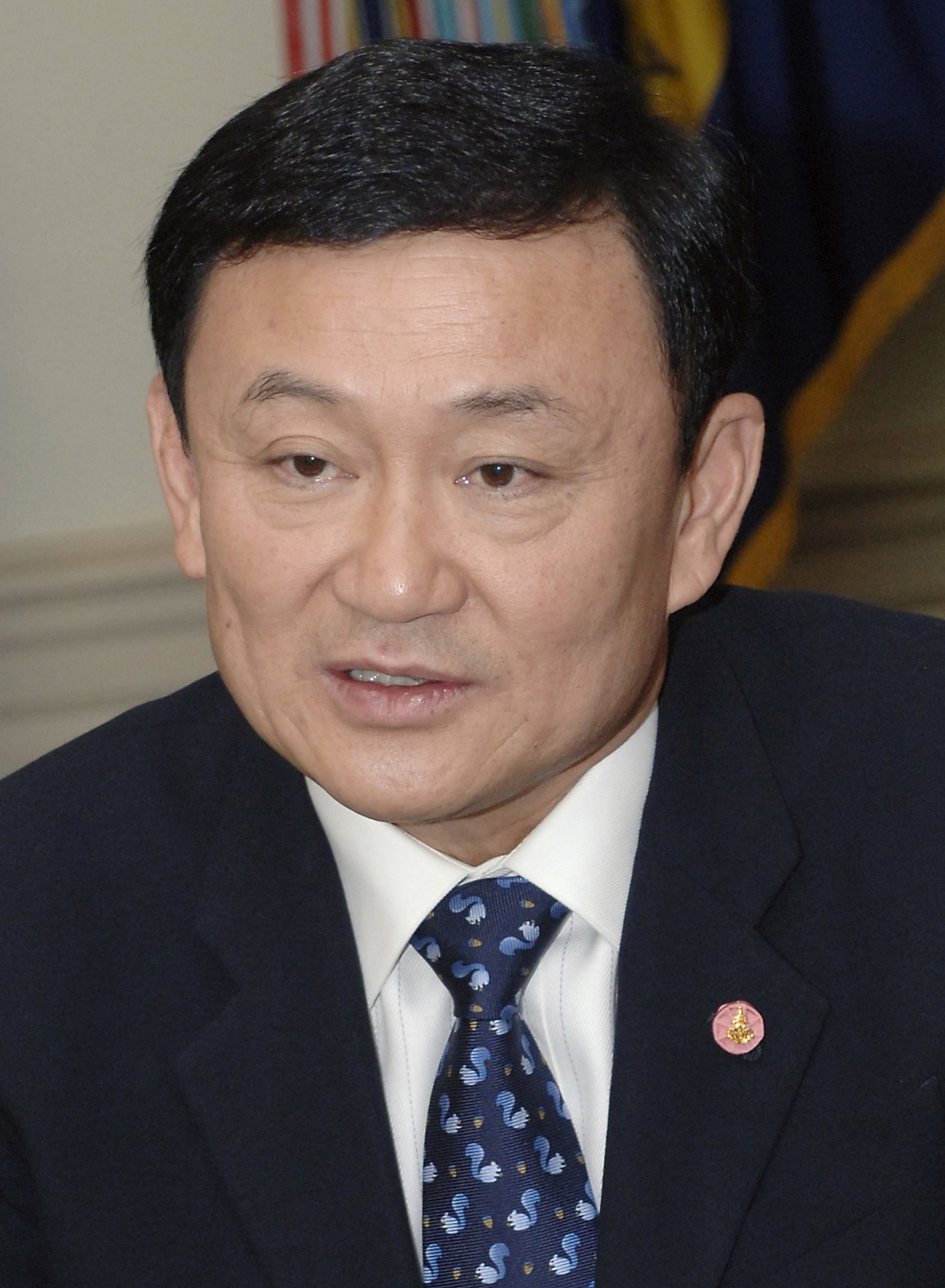
Thaksin Shinawatra, Prime Minister of Thailand

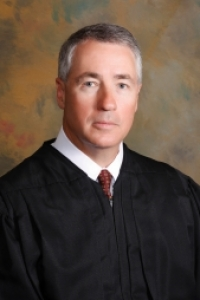
Danny C. Reeves, Chief Judge of the United States District Court for the Eastern District of Kentucky

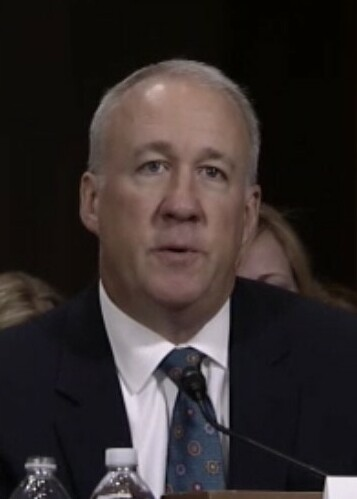
Gregory N. Stivers, Chief Judge of the United States District Court for the Western District of Kentucky

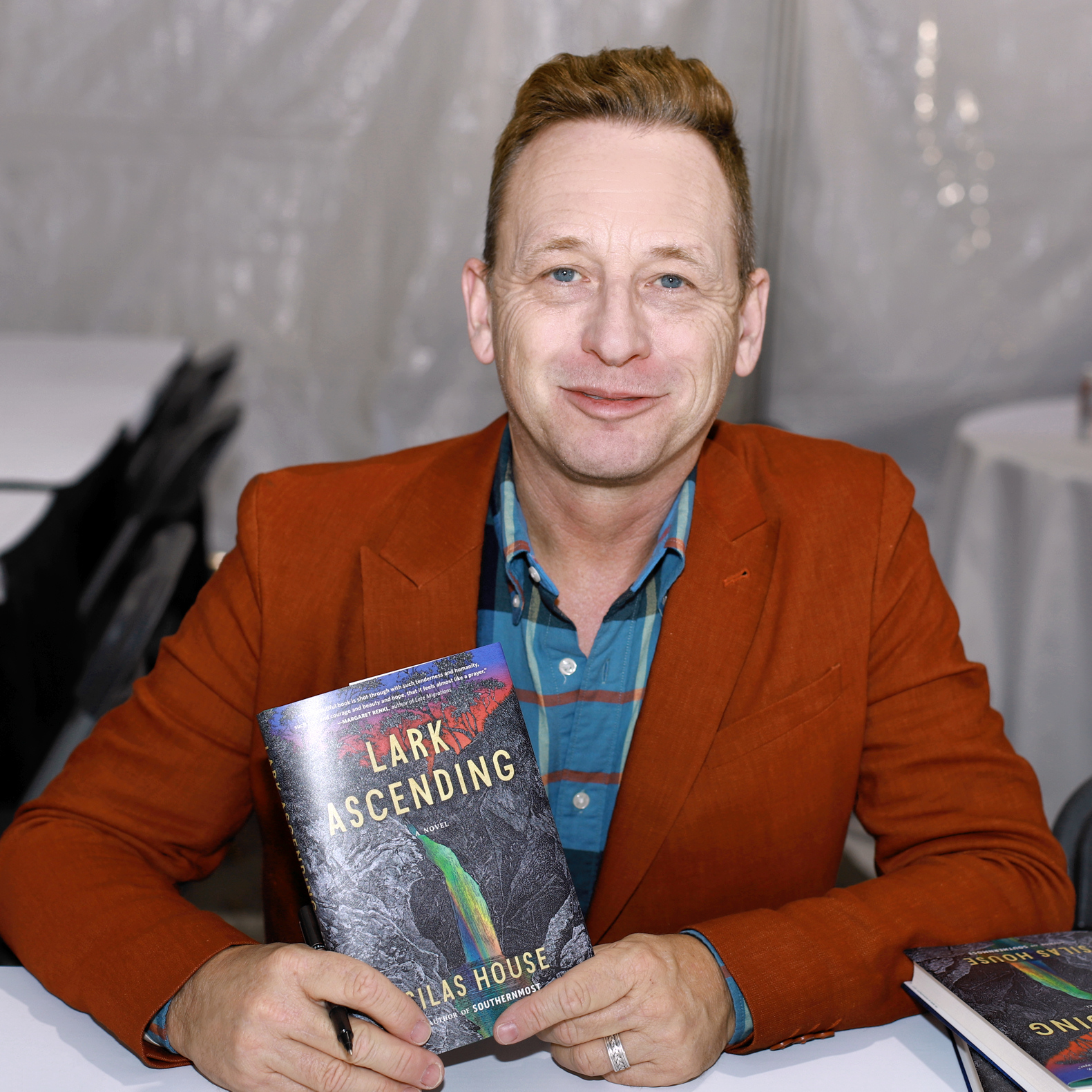
Silas House, Novelist

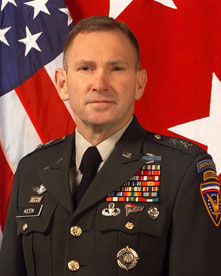
Ken Keen, Military Deputy Commander of United States Southern Command
