= Killick =

Haitian Coast Guard Naval Base

Coordinates: 18°35′39″N 72°18′26″W

Entrance to the Killick Coast Guard base

Killick, in relation to the city of Port-au-Prince

Killick (formerly the Admiral Killick Haitian Navy base; also called Point Killick) is the Haitian Coast Guard base in Port-au-Prince. It is the main base for the Coast Guard. It is the other port for the city, aside from the main Port international de Port-au-Prince. It is located about 10 miles outside of downtown Port-au-Prince, and is about a century old. The base is named after Admiral Hammerton Killick of the Haitian Navy, who scuttled his own ship, the Crête-à-Pierrot, a 940-ton screw gunship, by igniting the magazine, and went down with the ship, instead of surrendering to German forces, in 1902, at Gonaïves, Haiti.

== Facilities ==
The base is approximately an acre in size.

The port facilities can handle boats up to 40-footers. There were two piers, a north pier and a south pier. The north pier was destroyed in the 12 January 2010 quake.

A heliport is attached to the base.

== History ==
The base was set up during the 1915–1934 occupation of Haiti by the United States. It was a US Marine base.

The base was used by UN MINUSTAH forces at the time of the 7.0 magnitude 2010 January 12 earthquake in Port-au-Prince. Stationed at the base was a battalion of Sri Lankan UN peacekeepers, and a Uruguayan maritime police unit also with the UN. The Haitian Coast Guard units on base were a 28-footer and a 40-footer.

=== 2010 7.0 earthquake ===
The base was damaged in the 12 January 2010 7.0 earthquake. Only a handful of structures remained standing at the base. The roofs of many destroyed structures appeared to be collapsed down, while the four walls collapsed outwards. The main administrative building, mess hall, and depot were severely damaged. The south pier was damaged, and the north pier collapsed. The heliport was also non-operable as a result of the quake.

Crews from USCGC Tahoma and USCGC Mohawk are helping to rebuild the base. After the quake, a field hospital was set up at the base to treat victims of the quake. On the 18th, USS Gunston Hall anchored at the base, and started relief operations. The crew of Gunston Hall made the heliport operational again. As of 9 February 2010, the south pier was mostly operational again. A floating pier had been set up, which has cranes. A second floating pier is on its way. The harbour is being used as an entry port for aid to Haiti.
