= Port international de Port-au-Prince =

Port in Haiti

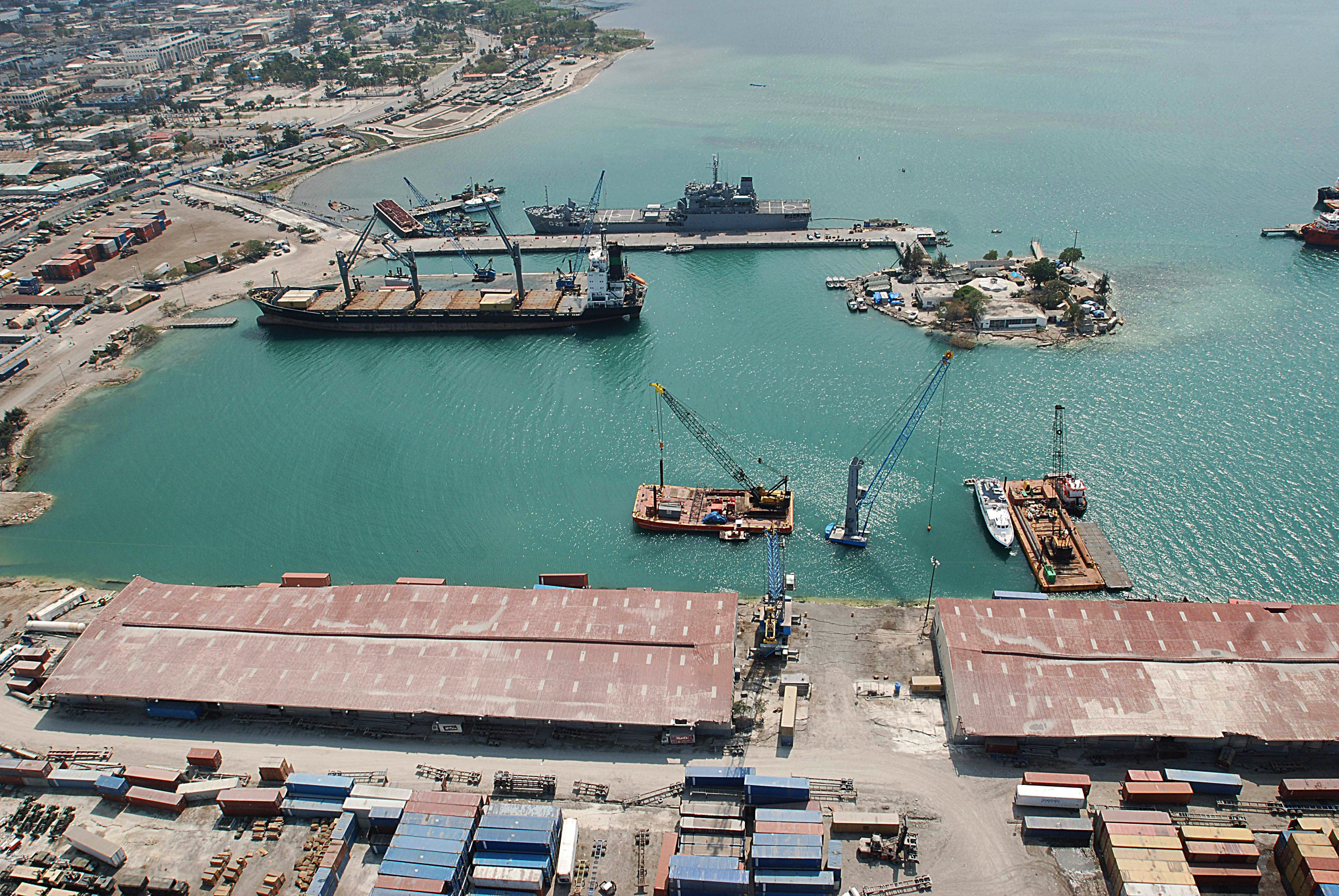
- The damaged port with relief ships after 2010 Haiti earthquake, 2010
- Interactive map of Port international de Port-au-Prince

Location
- Country: Haiti
- Location: Port-au-Prince
- Coordinates: 18°33′N 72°21′W

Details
- Operated by: APN and private companies
- Owned by: Autorité Portuaire Nationale (Haiti)
- No. of berths: 7

Statistics
- Annual TEU: 180,000 (2017)
- Website www.apn.gouv.ht

The seaport in relation to the city

The Port international de Port-au-Prince (UN/LOCODE: HTPAP) is the seaport of the capital of Haiti, Port-au-Prince. It suffered catastrophic damage in the 2010 Haiti earthquake, and reconstruction was completed in 2016. The port represents 80-90% of Port-au-Prince's container traffic, and has been described as "the jugular vein of the economy of Haiti." Since the beginning of the gang war in Haiti, the port has repeatedly been closed due to gang incursions.

Some of docks and warehouses are operated by the government's Autorité Portuaire Nationale (APN), and some are run by private companies.

== History ==
On 13 June 1872, a German fleet composed of SMS Vineta and SMS Gazelle seized Haitian Navy ships Union and Mont Organisé which were anchored in the port, as a means of pressure to have the Haitian government pay a 20,000 thaler debt to a German businessman.

In 1906, a Haitian-American company gained a 50-year concession to manage and operate the port.

In 1956, at the end of this term, the Administration Portuaire de Port-au-Prince (English: Port Administration of Port-au-Prince) was created, supervised by the Banque de la République d'Haïti (BRH). In 1973, The Port Administration became an autonomous body with the power to operate other ports; and in 1978, it was renamed the French: Autorité Portuaire Nationale (English: National Port Authority) under Haiti's secretariat of economic affairs. The APN was given control of all of Haiti's other ports as well in 1985.

On October 11, 1993, USS Harlan County, carrying 200 American and Canadian troops in implementation of the Governors Island Accord, attempted to enter the port, but was met by angry crowds, denied access to the dock, and ordered to leave Haiti the next day. On October 13, the United Nations re-imposed an oil and arms embargo.

In 1999, this port was believed to be "the most expensive port at which to dock and unload in the Americas", causing ships to unload in the neighbouring Dominican Republic.

=== 2010 earthquake ===
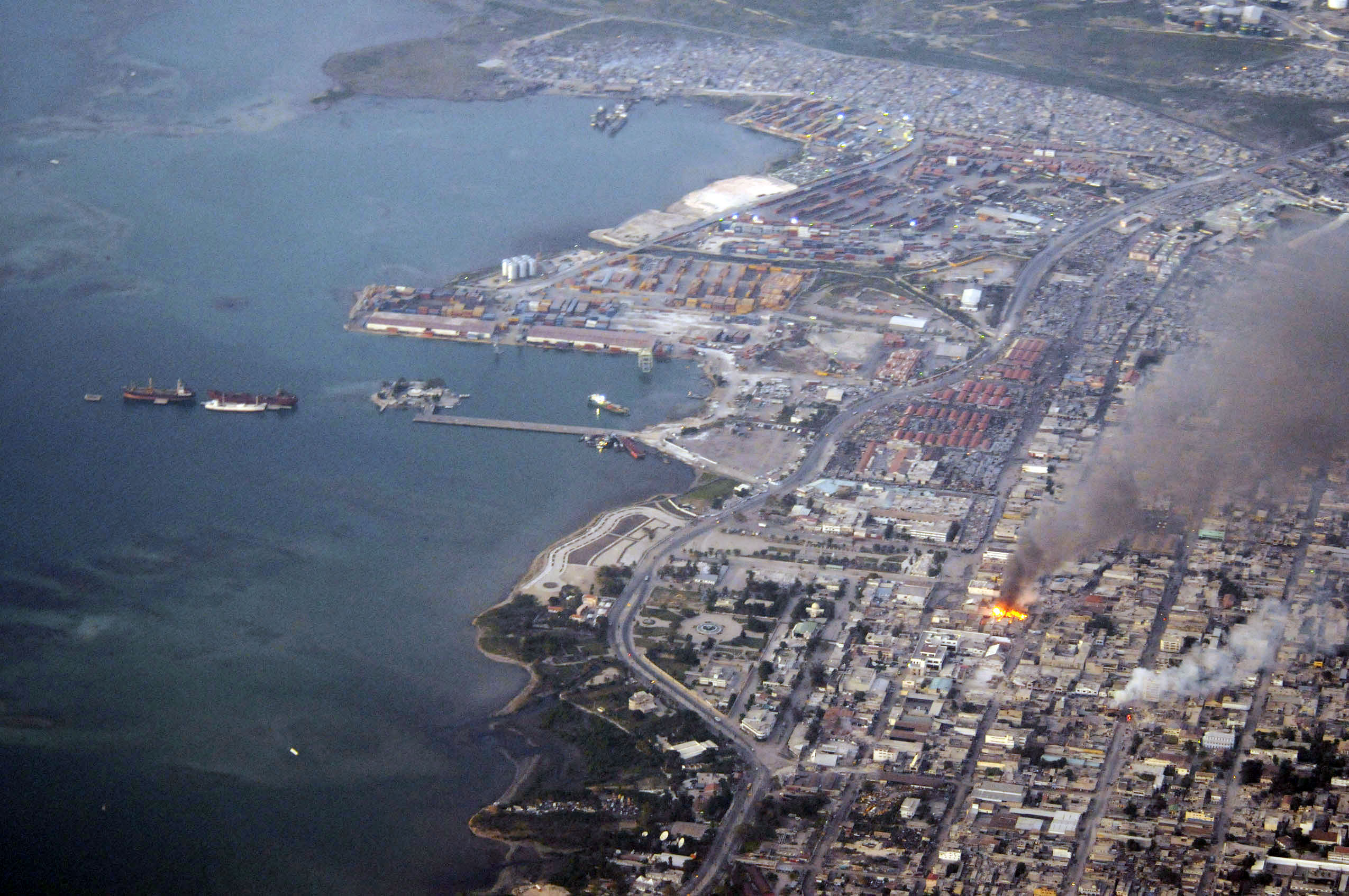
Port-au-Prince bayfront, port centered, after the quake

On 12 January 2010, a 7.0 magnitude earthquake struck, and crippled the port. The access road to the docks buckled, and slabs of concrete rose six feet above grade. Derrick cranes were thrown into the harbour; the shipping container unloading cranes were left leaning with their bases submerged. The seawall on some slips crumbled, and quayside areas slumped sideways into the harbor, carrying shipping containers into the water. The main pier on the northern end of the port was completely destroyed, with the cranes in the water, and the terminal collapsed. The south pier was severely damaged.

On the 19 January 2010 HNLMS Pelikaan (A804), a Royal Netherlands Navy logistic support vessel was the first ship to enter the crippled harbor. After an extensive hydrographical survey of the harbor, a route was cleared using the ship's crane and HNLMS Pelikaan could finally dock and unload its cargo and marines. On January 21 it was announced by the Dutch Ministry of Defense that HNLMS Pelikaan had finished unloading its cargo and would depart for Guantanamo Bay Naval Base to pick up the 20 men of Mobile Dive and Salvage Unit 2 (MDSU 2).

U.S. Defense Secretary Robert Gates announced on 20 January 2010 the dispatch of a port clearance ship with cranes to help the port become operational again.

On 21 January 2010, French vessel Francis Garnier moored to the damaged pier, although this is considered unsafe by US military divers.

On 27 January 2010, it was discovered that the south pier was more damaged than initially appeared, and cannot be used safely. It had previously been used by one ship at a time, unloading one container at a time, gingerly. The port is continued to be used by military landing craft of the type used in amphibious warfare to force a beachhead from a seaborne invasion.

As of 24 February 2010, the port had ramped up to handle container traffic around 600 containers a day, despite still having infrastructure damage. This is in excess of the 250 containers a day that it had been handling before the quake. The functioning of the port allows increased aid shipments arriving in-country.

=== After the earthquake ===
The government and National Port Authority reached a reconstruction agreement for the port in 2012. The first ship docked at the reconstructed north wharf on April 23, 2016. In 2016, the three largest container terminals in the port were consolidated and sold to Caribbean Port Services (CPS). In 2018, CPS CEO Philippe Coles reported that the renovated port had a capacity of 300,000 TEUs, and that in 2017, it handled 180,000 TEUs. The port has been affected by the ongoing gang war in Haiti since 2023. The port was shut down for several days after gang incursions in March 2024, it was shut down again in late September of the same year after several port workers were shot by gang members and others were taken hostage. On December 24, 2024, the cargo ship Maelys Lome II capsized in the Terminal Varreux, killing 7, injuring 17, and leading to a temporary suspension of port operations.

== Facilities ==
Before the 2010 earthquake, the facilities of the port were as follows:

- Number of berths: 7
- Two Ro-Ro berths: one 14 metres wide; the other 29 metres wide
- Total length of berths: 1,250 metres
- Depth of water alongside: 8 to 10 metres
- One gantry crane of 30 tonnes capacity
- One 33 tonne capacity forklift
- Six other forklifts with capacities between 3 and 7 tonnes
- Sixteen truck trailers
- Eight flatbeds for moving containers
- Fifteen chassis

Also, there were these private quays in the bay of Port-au-Prince:

| Terminal | Coordinates | Depth alongside | Equipment | Storage |
|---|---|---|---|---|
| Terminal Varreux (Quai de la HASCO) | 18°34′22.8″N 72°20′45.6″W | 9 metres (30 ft) | Pipeline and crane | |
| Les Moulins d’Haïti (Quai de Lafiteau) | 18°41′25.8″N 72°21′25.92″W | 9 metres (30 ft) | Vacuum and derricks for the discharge of grain | |
| La Cimenterie Nationale (Quai de Fond-Mombin) | 18°42′37″N 72°23′22″W | 8 metres (26 ft) | Mobile cranes | |
| Shell (Thor) | 18°32′27.6″N 72°23′06″W | 10–18 metres (33–59 ft) | pipelines and railway wagons | 6,699,000 gallons |
| Le Ciment du Sud (at Thor-le-volant) | 18°32′40″N 72°23′15″W | 12 metres (39 ft) | | |

The bay has 11 buoys:

Buoys in the port of Port-au-Prince
| ID | Coordinates |
|---|---|
| A | 18°33′13.1″N 72°22′43.1″W |
| B | 18°33′19″N 72°23′07.7″W |
| C | 18°33′24.6″N 72°23′31.5″W |
| D | 18°33′52.4″N 72°22′57″W |
| E | 18°33′58.1″N 72°23′20.6″W |
| F | 18°34′04.1″N 72°23′45″W |
| H | 18°34′09.1″N 72°24′09.2″W |
| J | 18°34′27″N 72°23′23″W |
| K | 18°34′44″N 72°23′57″W |
| L | 18°34′42″N 72°22′45″W |
| Q | 18°34′16.4″N 72°22′55″W |

== See also ==
- Killick
