= Haitian Coast Guard =

Water police and coast guard of Haiti

Coast Guard Commission of Haiti Commissariat des Gardes-Côtes d'Haïti
- Flag
- Abbreviation: G-Cd'H

Agency overview
- Formed: 1996 (current form)
- Employees: 200 (2019)

Jurisdictional structure
- National agency (Operations jurisdiction): Haiti
- Operations jurisdiction: Haiti
- Legal jurisdiction: Haitian and international waters
- Specialist jurisdiction: Coastal patrol, marine border protection, marine search and rescue

Operational structure
- Headquarters: Killick, Port-au-Prince
- Agency executive: Jean Pedro Mars, Commissioner
- Parent agency: Haitian National Police

The Haitian Coast Guard (French: Garde-Côtes d'Haïti; abbreviated G-Cd'H), officially the Coast Guard Commission of Haiti (French: Commissariat des Garde-Côtes d'Haïti, CGC), is an operational unit of the Haitian National Police. As a water police and coast guard, it is tasked with maritime law enforcement and maritime search and rescue.

The Haitian Coast Guard originated during the United States occupation of Haiti, which disbanded the Haitian Navy along with the rest of the Armed Forces of Haiti. From 1916, the Haitian Coast Guard functioned as part of the American-founded Gendarmerie of Haiti and was led by United States Navy personnel. It was tasked with transporting gendarmerie supplies and patrolling the Haitian coast for smugglers. From the late 1930s the Coast Guard was part of the Guard of Haiti, the renamed Haitian gendarmerie. In 1970, after a rebellion by much of the Coast Guard against François Duvalier, it was reorganized as the Haitian Navy. The Haitian military was again dissolved following Operation Uphold Democracy in 1995, and the Coast Guard was recreated in 1996 as part of the new Haitian National Police, a civilian police agency.

Since its restoration in 1996, the Haitian Coast Guard has received assistance in the form of training and equipment from the United States Coast Guard and the Canadian Coast Guard. It is tasked with the protection of Haiti's ports, coastline, and territorial waters, and has engaged in maritime search and rescue, drug interdiction, and migrant repatriation. As of 2025, the Haitian Coast Guard has five patrol boats and four bases, with its headquarters at Killick in Port-au-Prince. It was reported to have 200 personnel in 2019. Drug smuggling and illegal migration to the United States are the main challenges faced by the Haitian Coast Guard.

== History ==
=== Origin ===
The Haitian Coast Guard has its origins in the Haitian Navy, which was established in 1860. During the United States occupation of Haiti that began in 1915, the navy was disbanded along with the rest of the armed forces. A Haitian Coast Guard was formed as part of the American-organized Gendarmerie of Haiti, and consisted of Haitian coast guardsmen led by United States Navy officers and petty officers who were given commissions in the Haitian service. The personnel were organized in 1916, initially two officers and four petty officers from the US, and 30 Haitian sailors as enlisted coast guardsmen. In 1917, it received its new ships that had been ordered by the United States Department of the Navy. Its purpose was to transport gendarmerie supplies and to patrol the coast for smuggling. Four schooners purchased from the US were in service until they were lost in accidents or sold off, and were all gone as of 1922. Two former navy gunboats, Capois la Mort and Alexandre Pétion, were used until 1920. Smaller 24-foot motor boats were assigned to assist the gendarmerie in communications, with one at each district headquarters in Port-au-Prince, Les Cayes, Jérémie, and Jacmel.

The Coast Guard also had a lighthouse service, transferred in 1925 from the Department of Public Works, along with a small steamer, l'Eclaireur. As of 1927, the Coast Guard had one vessel, l'Eclaireur, and was led by Lieutenant Commander V. Wood, United States Navy. l'Eclaireur was deemed unfit for service and scuttled around 1928. As of 1929, Coast Guard motor boats were also stationed La Gonave, Petit-Goâve, Port-de-Paix, and Cap-Haïtien. In the 1930s, the Coast Guard became a section of the Garde d'Haïti, the name for the Haitian armed forces at the time. It was equipped with two small picket boats named 1 and 2 and the 161-ton Sans Souci. The latter was formerly the American yacht Captain James Taylor.

During World War II, six 83-foot cutters, named 1 through 6, were transferred from the United States Coast Guard in 1942. The USCG also modernized the main Coast Guard base at Bizoton, Port-au-Prince, and provided training to Haitian coast guardsmen. Three 121-ton SC-class submarine chasers, Toussaint Louverture, 16 Aout 1946, and Amiral Killick, were transferred in 1947, along with the 47-ton cutter Savannah and the light transport Vertières. The two picket boats were withdrawn at this time. In 1948, a US Naval Mission arrived in Haiti. The transport Vertières sank in 1951 and was replaced by the Artibonite, a tank landing craft which had been previously wrecked on the Haitian coast and was subsequently salvaged. The Coast Guard remained this way until the Amiral Killick was stricken in 1954 and was replaced by a US-sourced buoy tender given the same name in 1955. In 1956 a new 100-ton coast cutter, La Crête-à-Pierrot, was acquired from the United States. The two remaining submarine chasers were stricken in 1960 which is when the new Vertières, sister to the La Crête-à-Pierrot, was acquired. The US Navy netlayer USS Tonawanda, renamed Jean-Jacques Dessalines, arrived in 1960 for a five-year, extended to 17-year lease.

In April 1970, Colonel Octave Cayard, the commander of the Haitian Coast Guard, led the three major units—Vertières, La Crête-à-Pierrot, and Jean-Jacques Dessalines—into rebellion against president François Duvalier, demanding that he stepped down. Cayard led the rebellion himself from aboard one of the ships in Port-au-Prince harbor, after Duvalier demanded that he surrendered two of his officers to the political police during an investigation into a potential coup. The Coast Guard shelled the presidential palace before being forced to flee by a Haitian Aviation Corps P-51 Mustang, and the ships were interned at Guantanamo Bay by the United States. Some of the coast guard officers later returned to Haiti, though it lost over 100 officers and technicians. The coast guard was dissolved, and in October 1970, Duvalier recreated Haitian Navy to continue the mission of protecting the Haitian coast.

=== Current form ===
When the Armed Forces of Haiti were disbanded in 1995, including the Haitian Navy, its remnants were transferred to the Coast Guard, which was founded in August 1996. The United States was a driving force in the creation of the coast guard, and because the ships of the former Haitian navy were no longer operational, the US provided four Boston Whaler boats in 1996. The Coast Guard became a unit of the Haitian National Police, the Police Nationale d'Haïti (PNH), a civilian agency founded to replace the Haitian Army's previous role in internal security. Since being reestablished, the Haitian Coast Guard received extensive support from the United States Coast Guard and the Canadian Coast Guard in the form of training and equipment. Léon Charles was the commander of the Coast Guard in 1997.

It started out with less than ten boats that had mostly been confiscated from Colombian drug traffickers. Haiti became a major transit point for Colombian drug traffickers, and the Haitian Coast Guard has performed joint operations with the US Coast Guard to combat drug smuggling since 1996. US Coast Guard cutters routinely carried Haitian Coast Guard personnel as "ship-riders" while on operations against suspected drug smugglers in Haitian waters, which also gave them law enforcement powers there. In March 1997, the Haitian and US Coast Guard seized and brought to Port-au-Prince a Colombian boat carrying more than one ton of drugs, cocaine and marijuana, that attempted to reach the United States. In September 1997, the Haitian Coast Guard worked with its US counterparts and UN peacekeepers to rescue survivors among the 300 people that had been on the ferry boat La Fierte Gonavienne when it capsized off Montrouis. During 1998, the Haitian Coast Guard rescued 80 people.

The Coast Guard's Boston Whaler boats underwent a refit in Miami, Florida, in 1999. In the year 2000, the agency had 40 personnel. After the February 2004 Haitian coup d'état against President Jean-Bertrand Aristide, the Coast Guard was "the only functioning agency" of the Haitian government. Amidst the unrest, on the day that Aristide left the country, a USCG captain loaded two helicopters with 20-30 Haitian coast guardsmen and used them to protect the presidential palace from looters. The Haitian Coast Guard also worked with the USCG to repatriate over 900 Haitian migrants back to Port-au-Prince. As of 2004, the United States spent $4.6 million on training Haitian Coast Guard personnel, providing them with boats, and restoring their main base. In late April and early May 2005, the Haitian Coast Guard in Port-au-Prince repatriated 132 Haitian migrants that were picked up by the cutter USCGC Dependable near West Caicos Island.

The Haitian Coast Guard assisted the medical evacuation of Haitians injured by the 2010 Haiti earthquake to facilities aboard the USCGC Tahoma. The main challenges faced by the Haitian Coast Guard are illegal migration and drug trafficking to the United States, which take place on Haiti's long shoreline. The Haitian coast is frequented by Colombian and Venezuelan drug smugglers moving cocaine, who sometimes fire at the coast guardsmen. As of 2017, the commander of the Coast Guard was Joseph Jean Mary Wagnac. As of 2019, the Haitian Coast Guard was described as lacking in financial resources, manpower, and equipment to fulfill its mission along Haiti's entire 1,500-kilometer coastline. In October 2021, the Haitian and US coast guards interdicted a drug smuggling boat near Gonâve Island. In May 2022, the Haitian Coast Guard repatriated 207 Haitian migrants that were picked up by the USCGC Campbell. In March 2024, the Haitian Coast Guard in Cap-Haïtien repatriated 65 Haitian migrants that were picked up by the USCGC Venturous. In August 2025, Divisional Commissioner Jean Pedro Mars was appointed as the head of the Coast Guard, replacing Jeanty Duroil.

== Current organization ==
The Haitian Coast Guard (French: Garde-Côtes d'Haïti; abbreviated G-Cd'H), officially the Coast Guard Commission of Haiti (French: Commissariat des Garde-Côtes d'Haïti), is a specialized unit of the Haitian National Police (PNH), subordinated to the director-general of the national police. The Killick Coast Guard Base at the harbor of Port-au-Prince is the headquarters of the Haitian Coast Guard, and the unit also has bases in Cap-Haïtien, Les Cayes, and Port-de-Paix. The United States Coast Guard Seventh District, based in Miami, provides technical assistance to the Haitian Coast Guard through the Coast Guard Liaison Officer at the US embassy in Port-au-Prince.

As a water police and coast guard, the Haitian Coast Guard is tasked with law enforcement and the securing of Haiti's territorial waters and ports along its 1,500-kilometer coastline. This includes combating illegal trafficking (in drugs, arms, and people); ensuring compliance with laws and regulations in fishing and navigation; protecting marine wildlife; providing maritime search and rescue; and migrant repatriation.

=== Current fleet ===
In 2025, the International Institute for Strategic Studies listed five Dauntless-class patrol boats as the only ships of the Haitian Coast Guard. As of 2017, three boats were stationed in Port-au-Prince, and one each was stationed in Cap-Haïtien and Les Cayes. Its current vessels are marked with a diagonal blue before red racing stripe followed by the words Gardes-Côtes.

Class	Origin	Quantity	Ships	Combat displacement	Notes
Coastal patrol craft
Dauntless-class patrol boat	United States	5		14 tons	First two boats received in 2010 as part of a contract for five boats. The others had been received as of May 2012.

=== Personnel ===
As of 2011 there were 99 coast guardsmen. In 2015 the number of Coast Guard personnel increased to 150, and as of 2019 it was 200. Coast guardsmen receive training at the Haitian National Police Academy in Port-au-Prince. The USCG has also provided basic, intermediate, and mid-level management training, and has hosted Haitian personnel at its schools in the United States, which has included courses for officers at the United States Coast Guard Academy and the Naval War College.
