= Charles C. Whitlock =

American football player, coach, and prosecutor (1879–1960)

Biographical details
- Born: January 22, 1879; Vermilion County, Illinois, U.S.
- Died: February 13, 1960 (aged 81); Terre Haute, Indiana, U.S.

Playing career
- c. 1899: DePauw

Coaching career (HC unless noted)
- 1901: Indiana State Normal

Head coaching record
- Overall: 2–3–1

Charles Chester Whitlock (January 22, 1879 – February 13, 1960) was an American college football player and coach and a prosecutor. He served as the head football coach at Indiana State University, then known as Indiana State Normal, in 1901.

Whitlock was a 1900 graduate of DePauw University in Greencastle, Indiana, before arriving in Terre Haute to help coach the Indiana Normal team.

Whitlock later became a prosecutor in Terre Haute, Indiana, where he remained until his death in 1960.

== Head coaching record ==
| Year | Team | Overall | Conference | Standing | Bowl/playoffs |
|---|---|---|---|---|---|
Indiana State Sycamores (Independent) (1901)
| 1901 | Indiana State | 2–3–1 | | | |
| Indiana State: | | 2–3–1 | | | |
| Total: | | 2–3–1 | | | |
