= Charles D. Whitlock =

Eastern Kentucky University president

Interim President of Arkansas State University
- In office September 12, 2016 – June 30, 2017
- Preceded by: Tim Hudson
- Succeeded by: Kelly Damphousse

11th President of Eastern Kentucky University
- In office 2008–2013
- Preceded by: Joanne Glasser; Self (as interim president)
- Succeeded by: Michael T. Benson

Personal details
- Born: December 8, 1943 (age 82) Madison County, Kentucky, U.S.
- Education: Eastern Kentucky University B.A., M.Ed. University of Kentucky EdD

Charles Doug Whitlock is an American academic administrator who was born on August 12, 1943, in Madison County, Kentucky to his mother Thelma Emmond. Whitlock had a long career at Eastern Kentucky University spanning over 50 years, culminating in him serving as its 11th president from 2007 to 2013.

== Higher education ==
His association with Eastern Kentucky University spans over 50 years, beginning as a student (1961–65). Along with being a student he also served as a sports editor for the Eastern Progress newspaper from (1961–63). Whitlock earned a Bachelor of Arts degree in history and social science from EKU in 1965, and soon after, his Master of Education degree from EKU in 1966. He served as a captain in the U.S. Army, Before returning to become EKU director of public information (1970–76), overseeing various university events. Finally, he earned his Doctor of Education in higher education administration from the University of Kentucky in 1981. He then served as executive assistant to the president and Vice President for administrative affairs (1998–2003). After a brief retirement Whitlock returned to EKU to serve as interim president in 2007, later being named to the position permanently serving until 2013.

== Presidency ==
On April 25, 2008, Charles Whitlock was inaugurated as the 11th president of Eastern Kentucky University in the Alumni Coliseum. During his first year as President, EKU garnered many accolades and accomplishments despite facing one of the largest dollar reduction years in its history. EKU also received acclaim for its institution quality plan, which focused on developing students' critical and creative thinking skills. The Commission on Colleges recognized EKU's readiness to offer doctoral degrees, and in February, the Council on Post-secondary Education authorized the proposal for the Ed.D. in Educational Leadership. Eastern also reaffirmed its accreditation through the Southern Association of Colleges and Schools Commission on College.

EKU would also receive recognition from Forbes and U.S. News & World Report, designations as a community-engaged university by The Carnegie Foundation and Washington Monthly, and acknowledgment as one of America's "Great Colleges to Work For" by The Chronicle of Higher Education. Particularly noteworthy was EKU's recognition as a veterans-friendly campus by G.I. Jobs magazine and its national No. 1 ranking as "Best for Vets" by Military Times EDGE magazine twice in a three-year span, something so noteworthy that First Lady Michelle Obama would select Eastern out of 3 schools to go deliver a commencement speech as part of her Joining Forces initiative to assist military families. Also, during his presidency, EKU's athletics department achieved the 2011–12 OVC Commissioner's Cup for overall athletic excellence.

Whitlock was noted for his budgetary expertise and oversaw significant academic achievements, including the university's first Truman, Goldwater, and Fulbright scholars, as well as the addition of several Ph.D. programs. Additionally, he supervised the construction of a new arts center, a facility for the Manchester campus, and the initial phase of a new science center.

During a meeting on August 15, 2012, with faculty and staff at Eastern Kentucky University, President Doug Whitlock announced his retirement. Whitlock, who had spent his higher education career at EKU, stated that his administration would end at the conclusion of the academic year. This was Whitlock's second retirement, having left EKU in 2003 after a 27-year career in other positions at Eastern.

In 2013, an award was established in Whitlock's honor, called the Charles D. Whitlock Distinguished Alumnus Award, recognizing his accomplishments and years of service to EKU. The award is granted to an alumnus of the history and history teaching programs for their accomplishments since graduating from the programs. To pay tribute to Charles Doug Whitlock's more than 40 years of service to Eastern, the Student Success Center was named the "Charles D. Whitlock Student Success Building" in 2013.

== Later work ==
After his presidency, Dr. Doug Whitlock was appointed as Arkansas State University interim Chancellor, effective September 12, 2016. Upon assuming the position, Whitlock and his wife relocated to Jonesboro to reside at the chancellor's residence. He served in this role until June 30, 2017, with the stipulation that additional interim time would be provided if necessary.

During his tenure as chancellor, alongside ASU president Charles L. Welch, Whitlock co-authored an article titled "Reflections on a Vision: Arkansas State University Queretaro Campus." This article detailed Arkansas State's efforts in developing an American-style campus in the state of Querétaro, Mexico. He would eventually return to Richmond, Kentucky where he now resides.
