= List of shipwrecks in September 1914 =

The list of shipwrecks in September 1914 includes ships sunk, foundered, grounded, or otherwise lost during September 1914.

== 1 September ==
List of shipwrecks: 1 September 1914
Ship	State	Description
Arizona	United States	While pulled out on the beach with no one aboard, the 11-gross register ton motor vessel was stranded on a spit and destroyed by a gale on the west-central coast of the Territory of Alaska at Chiukak (64°31′N 163°22′W), ten nautical miles (19 km; 12 mi) west of Golovin.

== 2 September ==
List of shipwrecks: 2 September 1914
Ship	State	Description
Ajax	United Kingdom	World War I: The trawler (120 GRT) struck a mine and sank in the North Sea off the mouth of the River Humber with the loss of nine of her crew.
HMT Eyrie	Royal Navy	The naval trawler was lost on this date.
Fittonia	United Kingdom	World War I: The trawler (146 GRT) struck a mine and sank in the North Sea off the mouth of the River Humber with the loss of seven of her crew.
S:t Paul	Sweden	World War I: The cargo ship, en route from Gothenburg to Sunderland, struck a mine in the North Sea, about 28 nautical miles (52 km) northeast of Tyne, and sank quickly. The crew survived, and was transported back to North Shields by the steamer D/S Bruse (Norway). It was Sweden's first ship loss during World War I.

== 3 September ==
List of shipwrecks: 3 September 1914
Ship	State	Description
HMT Lindsell	Royal Navy	World War I: The naval trawler struck a mine and sank in the North Sea with the loss of five of her crew. Survivors were rescued by HMS Speedy (Royal Navy).
Maple Branch	United Kingdom	World War I: The cargo ship (4,338 GRT, 1905) was scuttled in the Atlantic Ocean 250 nautical miles (460 km) south west of the St. Paul Rocks by SMS Karlsruhe (Imperial German Navy).
Shirotaye	Imperial Japanese Navy	World War I: The Asakaze-class destroyer was wrecked in the Yellow Sea (approximately 36°00′N 120°30′E) whilst involved in a battle with SMS Jaguar (Imperial German Navy).
HMS Speedy	Royal Navy	World War I: The Alarm-class torpedo gunboat struck a mine and sank in the North Sea with the loss of one of her 91 crew.

== 4 September ==
List of shipwrecks: 4 September 1914
Ship	State	Description
Fox	United States	The 15-gross register ton, 51.9-foot (15.8 m) fishing vessel was destroyed by fire at Shelter Island in the Alexander Archipelago in Southeast Alaska near Juneau, Territory of Alaska. All three people on board survived.
Indian Prince	United Kingdom	World War I: The cargo ship (2,846 GRT) was scuttled in the Atlantic Ocean 240 nautical miles (440 km) east by north of Pernambuco, Brazil, by the auxiliary cruiser SMS Kronprinz Wilhelm (Imperial German Navy).

== 5 September ==
List of shipwrecks: 5 September 1914
Ship	State	Description
HMS Pathfinder	Royal Navy	HMS Pathfinder World War I: The Pathfinder-class cruiser was torpedoed and sunk in the Firth of Forth (56°07′N 2°09′W) by SM U-21 (Imperial German Navy) with the loss of 260 of the 270 people on board.
Runo	United Kingdom	World War I: The passenger ship (1,679 GRT) struck a mine placed by the cruiser SMS Albatross (Imperial German Navy) and sank in the North Sea with the loss of 29 of the 300-plus people on board.

== 6 September ==
List of shipwrecks: 6 September 1914
Ship	State	Description
Argonaut	United Kingdom	World War I: The trawler was shelled and sunk in the North Sea by two cruisers and four destroyers (all Imperial German Navy). Her crew were taken as prisoners of war.
Chameleon	United Kingdom	World War I: The trawler was shelled and sunk in the North Sea by two cruisers and four destroyers (all Imperial German Navy). Her crew were taken as prisoners of war.
Imperialist	United Kingdom	World War I: The trawler struck a mine placed by the minelayer SMS Albatross (Imperial German Navy) and sank in the North Sea off the mouth of the River Tyne with the loss of two of her crew. Survivors were rescued by the trawler Rhodesian (United Kingdom).
Lobelia	United Kingdom	World War I: The trawler was shelled and sunk in the North Sea by two cruisers and four destroyers (all Imperial German Navy). Her crew were taken as prisoners of war.
Harrier	United Kingdom	World War I: The trawler was shelled and sunk in the North Sea by two cruisers and four destroyers (all Imperial German Navy). Her crew were taken as prisoners of war.
Montana	United States	During a voyage from Detroit, Michigan, to Georgian Bay in Ontario, Canada, to load a cargo of lumber, the wooden steam barge burned to the waterline near North Point on the coast of Michigan and sank in 63 feet (19 m) of water in Thunder Bay on the coast of Lake Huron off Sulphur Island at 44.98375°N 83.266883°W. Her crew abandoned ship in her boat and was rescued by the passenger ship Alpena (United States).
Pegasus	United Kingdom	World War I: The trawler was shelled and sunk in the North Sea by two cruisers and four destroyers (all Imperial German Navy). Her crew were taken as prisoners of war.
Pollux	United Kingdom	World War I: The trawler was shelled and sunk in the North Sea by two cruisers and four destroyers (all Imperial German Navy). Her crew were taken as prisoners of war.
Rideo	United Kingdom	World War I: The trawler was shelled and sunk in the North Sea by two cruisers and four destroyers (all Imperial German Navy). Her crew were taken as prisoners of war.
Rhine	United Kingdom	World War I: The trawler was shelled and sunk in the North Sea by two cruisers and four destroyers (all Imperial German Navy). Her crew were taken as prisoners of war.
Seti	United Kingdom	World War I: The trawler was shelled and sunk in the North Sea by two cruisers and four destroyers (all Imperial German Navy). Her crew were taken as prisoners of war.
Valiant	United Kingdom	World War I: The trawler was shelled and sunk in the North Sea by two cruisers and four destroyers (all Imperial German Navy). Her crew were taken as prisoners of war.

== 7 September ==
List of shipwrecks: 7 September 1914
Ship	State	Description
Revigo	United Kingdom	World War I: The trawler (230 GRT) struck a mine and sank in the North Sea. Her crew were rescued by the trawler Andromeda (United Kingdom).

== 8 September ==
List of shipwrecks: 8 September 1914
Ship	State	Description
Kamerun	Germany	World War I: The cargo ship was scuttled at Duala, Kamerun. She was subsequently refloated, repaired and entered British service as Cameronia.
HMS Oceanic	Royal Navy	The armed merchant cruiser (17,272 GRT, 1899) ran aground off Foula, Shetland Islands. All on board were rescued by the fishing trawler Glenogil (United Kingdom) and transferred to HMS Alsatian and HMS Forward (both Royal Navy). Oceanic was wrecked in a storm on 29 September.

== 9 September ==
List of shipwrecks: 9 September 1914
Ship	State	Description
Alert	United States	After she became disabled by a broken tail shaft during a voyage from Juneau to Tyee, Territory of Alaska, the 12-net register ton motor vessel drifted onto rocks, was pounded against them by the surf, and sank off Point Styleman (57°58′30″N 133°53′45″W) in Snettisham Inlet in Southeast Alaska. Her crew of two survived, but she was a total loss.
Chesterfield	United Kingdom	The sloop was driven ashore at Spurn Point, Yorkshire and wrecked. Her crew were rescued.
Tua	Sweden	The steamer, en route from Peterhead to Helsingborg, sank after a collision in poor visibility with an unnamed British warship, about 55 nautical miles (102 km) off Peterhead. The ship sank quickly, and one British passenger and one crew member died.

== 10 September ==
List of shipwrecks: 10 September 1914
Ship	State	Description
Indus	United Kingdom	World War I: The cargo ship (3,413 or 3,393 GRT, 1904) was captured in the Indian Ocean (11°00′N 83°45′E) by SMS Emden (Imperial German Navy) and was scuttled after all her crew had been taken on board.

== 11 September ==
List of shipwrecks: 11 September 1914
Ship	State	Description
Elsinore	United Kingdom	World War I: The tanker (6,542 GRT, 1913) was shelled and sunk in the Pacific Ocean 73 nautical miles (135 km) south west by west of Cape Corrientes, Mexico by SMS Leipzig (Imperial German Navy).
Lovat	United Kingdom	World War I: The cargo ship (6,102 GRT) was captured and scuttled in the Indian Ocean 260 nautical miles (480 km) east of Madras, India by SMS Emden (Imperial German Navy). Her crew were taken as prisoners of war.
Meteor	Imperial Russian Navy	The minesweeper ran aground in the Baltic Sea off "Merholm Island" and sank. Her crew were rescued. She was on a voyage from Helsinki, Grand Duchy of Finland to the Baresund.

== 12 September ==
List of shipwrecks: 12 September 1914
Ship	State	Description
Killin	United Kingdom	World War I: The cargo ship (3,544 GRT) was captured in the Indian Ocean 410 nautical miles (760 km) north east by north of Madras, India by SMS Emden (Imperial German Navy). She was scuttled the next day. Her crew were taken as prisoners of war.

== 13 September ==
List of shipwrecks: 13 September 1914
Ship	State	Description
Diplomat	United Kingdom	World War I: The cargo ship (7,615 GRT) was captured and scuttled in the Indian Ocean 480 nautical miles (890 km) north east of Madras, India by SMS Emden (Imperial German Navy). Her crew were taken as prisoners of war.
SMS Hela	Imperial German Navy	World War I: The Gazelle-class cruiser was torpedoed and sunk in the North Sea southwest of Heligoland by HMS E9 (Royal Navy) with the loss of two of her 178 crew.

== 14 September ==
List of shipwrecks: 14 September 1914
Ship	State	Description
HMAS AE1	Royal Australian Navy	The E-class submarine was lost in the Pacific Ocean off New Britain with the loss of all 35 crew. Wreck found in 2017.
SMS Cap Trafalgar	Imperial German Navy	SMS Cap Trafalgar and HMS Carmania World War I: Battle of Trindade: The auxiliary cruiser was sunk at Trindade, Brazil in a battle with HMS Carmania (Royal Navy) with the loss of 51 of her 330 crew.
Clan Matheson	United Kingdom	World War I: The cargo ship (4,775 GRT, 1906) was scuttled in the Bay of Bengal 60 nautical miles (110 km) south west by south of the mouth of the Hooghly River by SMS Emden (Imperial German Navy). Emden released Clan Matheson's crew to Dovre (Norway), which landed them at Rangoon.
Highland Hope	United Kingdom	World War I: The cargo ship (5,150 or 5,510 GRT, 1903) was scuttled in the Atlantic Ocean 190 nautical miles (350 km) south west of the St Paul Rocks, Brazil by SMS Karlsruhe (Imperial German Navy).
Trabboch	United Kingdom	World War I: The cargo ship (4,028 GRT) was shelled and sunk in the Indian Ocean 70 nautical miles (130 km) south west by south of the mouth of the Hooghly River by SMS Emden (Imperial German Navy).

== 17 September ==
List of shipwrecks: 17 September 1914
Ship	State	Description
Argyll	United Kingdom	World War I: The Admiralty-requisitioned cargo ship (1,185 GRT, 1872) was scuttled in Skerry Sound, Scapa Flow as a block ship. Salvaged, except for her boiler, at some point.
Fisgard	United Kingdom	The cargo ship foundered in the English Channel 2 to 3 nautical miles (3.7 to 5.6 km) off Portland Bill, Dorset in a storm with the loss of two of her 64 crew. Survivors were rescued by Crown of Galicia, Danube and Southampton (all United Kingdom). (See Fisgard II)
Indrani	United Kingdom	World War I: The cargo ship (5,706 GRT, 1912) was scuttled in the Atlantic Ocean 145 nautical miles (269 km) north by west of Cabo São Roque, Brazil by SMS Karlsruhe (Imperial German Navy).
Fisgard II	Royal Navy	The training ship, a former Audacious-class battleship, sank in a storm in the English Channel off Portland Bill with the loss of 21 of her 64 crew.

== 18 September ==
List of shipwrecks: 18 September 1914
Ship	State	Description
Francis H. Leggett	United States	The steam schooner sank in a gale in the Pacific Ocean off the coast of Oregon with the loss of 60 of the 62 people on board. One survivor each were rescued by Buck and by Beaver (both flag unknown).
Montmagny	Canada	The cargo ship collided with Lingan (United Kingdom) in the St. Lawrence River and sank with the loss of fourteen of her crew.
Rosewood	United Kingdom	World War I: The Admiralty-requisitioned cargo ship was scuttled in Skerry Sound, Scapa Flow as a block ship. Mostly scrapped in situ later; stern and boilers still in place.
SMS William	Imperial German Navy	The Vorpostenboot was lost on this date.

== 19 September ==
List of shipwrecks: 19 September 1914
Ship	State	Description
Gamma	Norway	The schooner was wrecked on Vlieland, Friesland, Netherlands with some loss of life.
Ocean	Sweden	The schooner was wrecked on Vlieland. Her crew were rescued.
Teeswood	United Kingdom	World War I: The Admiralty requisitioned cargo ship (1,589 GRT, 1882) was scuttled in Skerry Sound, Scapa Flow as a block ship. Scrapped in 1924.

== 20 September ==
List of shipwrecks: 20 September 1914
Ship	State	Description
SMS Lesum	Imperial German Navy	The Vorpostenboot was lost on this date.
HMS Pegasus	Royal Navy	World War I: The Pelorus-class cruiser was shelled and sunk by SMS Königsberg (Imperial German Navy) in Zanzibar harbour with the loss of 38 of her 224 crew. The wreck was scrapped in 1955.
USRC Tahoma	United States Revenue Cutter Service	The revenue cutter struck an uncharted reef – thereafter known as Tahoma Reef (51°48′N 175°47′E) – in the Aleutian Islands and sank without loss of life. Her crew abandoned ship in three lifeboats and was rescued by the merchant steamer Cordova (United States), which picked up the commanding officer's lifeboat at sea, and the survey ship USC&GS Carlile P. Patterson ( United States Coast and Geodetic Survey), which rescued the rest of the crew after their boats reached Agattu in the Near Islands and Alaid Island in the Semichi Islands.
HMS Yarmouth II	Royal Navy	The ship was driven ashore between Margate and Westgate-on-Sea, Kent.

== 21 September ==
List of shipwrecks: 21 September 1914
Ship	State	Description
Belgian King	United Kingdom	The cargo liner foundered in the Black Sea off Cape Kureli, Ottoman Turkey with the loss of 22 of the 120 people on board. Survivors were rescued by Princesse Eugenie (Russia).
Cornish City	United Kingdom	World War I: The cargo ship (3,816 GRT, 1906) was scuttled in the Atlantic Ocean 245 nautical miles (454 km) south west of the St Paul Rocks, Brazil by SMS Karlsruhe (Imperial German Navy).

== 22 September ==
List of shipwrecks: 22 September 1914
Ship	State	Description
HMS Aboukir	Royal Navy	HMS Aboukir and HMS Hogue World War I: Action of 22 September 1914: The Cressy-class cruiser was torpedoed and sunk in the North Sea off the Dutch coast (52°18′N 03°41′E) by SM U-9 (Imperial German Navy) with the loss of 527 lives.
HMS Cressy	Royal Navy	HMS Cressy World War I: Action of 22 September 1914: The Cressy-class cruiser was torpedoed and sunk in the North Sea off the Dutch coast (52°18′N 03°41′E) by SM U-9 (Imperial German Navy) with the loss of 562 lives.
HMS Hogue	Royal Navy	World War I: Action of 22 September 1914: The Cressy-class cruiser was torpedoed and sunk in the North Sea off the Dutch coast (52°18′N 03°41′E) by SM U-9 (Imperial German Navy) with the loss of 375 lives.
Kilmarnock	United Kingdom	World War I: The trawler (165 GRT) struck a mine and sank in the North Sea 31 nautical miles (57 km) east of Spurn Point, Yorkshire with the loss of six of her cew.
Mauritzia	Sweden	The schooner was driven ashore on Öland and was wrecked.
Rothenfield	United Kingdom	World War I: The cargo ship was sunk as a blockship in Scapa Flow, Orkney Islands. Wreck blown up as a hazard to navigation in 1962.
Rio Iguassu	United Kingdom	World War I: The cargo ship (3,817 GRT, 1898) was scuttled in the Atlantic Ocean 155 nautical miles (287 km) south west by west of the St Paul Rocks, Brazil by SMS Karlsruhe (Imperial German Navy).
Urmston Grange	United Kingdom	World War I: The cargo ship was sunk as a blockship in Scapa Flow. Wreck blown up as a hazard to navigation in 1962.
Walküre	Germany	World War I: Bombardment of Papeete: While French personnel were scuttling her, the cargo ship, captured by French forces on 15 August, was sunk at Papeete, Tahiti, by gunfire by the armoured cruisers SMS Gneisenau and SMS Scharnhorst (both Imperial German Navy) in 11 fathoms (66 ft; 20 m) of water. Raised over a year later, repaired and sold by the French. Returned to service as Republic.
Zélée	French Navy	World War I: Bombardment of Papeete: While her crew was scuttling her, the Surprise-class gunboat was sunk at Papeete, Tahiti, by gunfire by the armoured cruisers SMS Gneisenau and SMS Scharnhorst (both Imperial German Navy). She was raised, her guns removed and scuttled as a blockship on 29 September.

== 23 September ==
List of shipwrecks: 23 September 1914
Ship	State	Description
Rebono	United Kingdom	World War I: The trawler (176 GRT) struck a mine and sank in the North Sea 25 nautical miles (46 km) east by north of the Spurn Lightship (United Kingdom) with the loss of a crew member.

== 24 September ==
List of shipwrecks: 24 September 1914
Ship	State	Description
Andrew Nebinger	United States	The schooner went ashore on Little Gull Island, New York. Refloated and returned to service.

== 25 September ==
List of shipwrecks: 25 September 1914
Ship	State	Description
Bankfields	United Kingdom	World War I: The cargo ship (3,763 GRT) was shelled and sunk in the Gulf of Guayaquil by SMS Leipzig (Imperial German Navy).
King Lud	United Kingdom	World War I: The cargo ship (3,650 GRT, 1906) was scuttled in the Indian Ocean 25 nautical miles (46 km) south south west of Point de Galle, Ceylon by SMS Emden (Imperial German Navy).
Tymeric	United Kingdom	World War I: The cargo ship (3,314 GRT) was scuttled in the Indian Ocean 50 nautical miles (93 km) west by north of Colombo, Ceylon by SMS Emden (Imperial German Navy).

== 27 September ==
List of shipwrecks: 27 September 1914
Ship	State	Description
Foyle	United Kingdom	World War I: The cargo ship (4,147 GRT) was scuttled in the Indian Ocean 300 nautical miles (560 km) west by north of Colombo, Ceylon by SMS Emden (Imperial German Navy).
Lacouna	United Kingdom	The cargo ship was driven ashore on Ferryland Head, Newfoundland and was wrecked. Her crew were rescued.
Ribera	United Kingdom	World War I: The cargo ship (3,500 GRT) was shelled and sunk in the Indian Ocean 210 nautical miles (390 km) west by north of Colombo by SMS Emden (Imperial German Navy).

== 28 September ==
List of shipwrecks: 28 September 1914
Ship	State	Description
Anglo-Norman	Norway	The barque was driven ashore at Kaipara Harbour, North Island, New Zealand and was wrecked. Her crew were rescued.
Agda	Netherlands	The auxiliary schooner struck a submerged object and foundered in the Atlantic Ocean off Cabo da Roca, Portugal. Her crew were rescued by Khiva (United Kingdom).
SMS Cormoran	Imperial German Navy	World War I: Siege of Qingdao: The Bussard-class cruiser was scuttled at Qingdao, China.
SMS Iltis	Imperial German Navy	World War I: Siege of Qingdao: The Iltis-class gunboat was scuttled at Qingdao, China.
SMS Luchs	Imperial German Navy	World War I: Siege of Qingdao: The Iltis-class gunboat was scuttled at Qingdao, China.
SMS T50	Imperial German Navy	The S7-class torpedo boat was wrecked in the Baltic Sea.
SMS Taku	Imperial German Navy	World War I: Siege of Qingdao: The Taku-class torpedo boat was scuttled at Qingdao.

== 29 September ==
List of shipwrecks: 29 September 1914
Ship	State	Description
Zélée	French Navy	The Surprise-class gunboat was shelled and sunk at Papeete, Tahiti by SMS Scharnhorst and SMS Gneisenau (both Imperial German Navy) on 22 September. Raised, had her guns removed, and scuttled on 29 September as a blockship for the harbour.
