= SMS Tiger =

Several ships in the Prussian Navy and later German Imperial Navy and the Austro-Hungarian Navy have been named SMS Tiger:

- SMS Tiger (1860), a Prussian and later German Jäger-class gunboat launched in 1860
- SMS Tiger (1887), an Austro-Hungarian torpedo cruiser launched in 1887
- SMS Tiger (1899), a German Iltis-class gunboat launched in 1899
