= SMS Tiger (1899) =

Third member of the Iltis class

Coordinates: 36.0500°N 120.2667°E

- Tiger at sea

History

German Empire
- Name: SMS Tiger
- Namesake: SMS Tiger
- Builder: Kaiserliche Werft Danzig
- Laid down: November 1898
- Launched: 15 August 1899
- Commissioned: 3 April 1900
- Decommissioned: 1 August 1914
- Fate: Scuttled on 29 October 1914

General characteristics
- Class & type: Iltis-class gunboat
- Displacement: Designed: 894 t (880 long tons); Full load: 1,108 t (1,091 long tons)
- Length: 65.2 m (213 ft 11 in) o/a
- Beam: 9.1 m (29 ft 10 in)
- Draft: 3.56 m (11 ft 8 in)
- Installed power: 4 × Thornycroft boilers; 1,300 PS (1,300 ihp)
- Propulsion: 2 × triple-expansion steam engines; 2 × screw propellers
- Speed: 13.5 knots (25.0 km/h; 15.5 mph)
- Range: 2,580 nautical miles (4,780 km; 2,970 mi) at 9 knots (17 km/h; 10 mph)
- Complement: 9 officers; 121 enlisted men
- Armament: 2 × 10.5 cm (4.1 in) SK L/40 guns; 6 × 37 mm (1.5 in) Maxim guns
- Armor: Conning tower: 8 mm (0.31 in)

SMS Tiger was the third member of the Iltis class of gunboats built for the German Kaiserliche Marine (Imperial Navy) in the late 1890s and early 1900s. The ships were built to modernize the German gunboat force that was used to patrol the German colonial empire. They were ordered in three groups of two ships, each pair incorporating design improvements. Tiger, along with Luchs, was armed with a main battery of two 10.5 cm (4.1 in) guns, had a top speed of 13.5 knots (25.0 km/h; 15.5 mph), and could cruise for more than 2,500 nautical miles (4,630 km; 2,880 mi).

After entering service in 1900, Tiger was sent to the Far East to join the East Asia Squadron based in Qingdao, China. The ship spent much of her career cruising in the waters of the Far East. She did not participate in any fighting during the Boxer Uprising in China in 1900–1901, and instead patrolled the Yellow Sea. In early 1904, after the start of the Russo-Japanese War, the ship was used to evacuate Germans from Incheon, Korea, to avoid the fighting taking place in the country. During the Xinhai Revolution in China in 1911–1912, Tiger went to several cities to ensure the fighting did not affect Germans living in them. After the start of World War I in July 1914, Tiger was disarmed; her guns and part of her crew were used to equip the steamer Prinz Eitel Friedrich as an auxiliary cruiser. Tiger was subsequently scuttled during the Siege of Qingdao in October 1914.

== Design ==
Plan and profile of the Iltis class

The German Kaiserliche Marine (Imperial Navy) abandoned gunboat construction for more a decade after Eber, launched in 1887, instead focusing on larger unprotected cruisers beginning with the Schwalbe class. By the mid-1890s, the navy began planning replacements for the older vessels of the Wolf and Habicht classes. The new ships were scheduled to begin construction by 1900, but the loss of the gunboat Iltis in a storm necessitated an immediate replacement, which was added to the 1898 naval budget. The new ship was planned to patrol the German colonial empire; requirements included engines powerful enough for the ship to steam up the Yangtze in China, where the new gunboat was intended to be deployed. Six ships were built in three identical pairs; each pair incorporated incremental improvements over the preceding set, and Tiger was one of the second pair, along with Luchs.

Tiger was 65.2 meters (213 ft 11 in) long overall and had a beam of 9.1 m (29 ft 10 in) and a draft of 3.56 m (11 ft 8 in) forward. She displaced 894 metric tons (880 long tons) as designed and 1,108 t (1,091 long tons) at full load. The ship had a raised forecastle deck and a straight stem. Her superstructure consisted primarily of a conning tower with an open bridge atop it. She had a crew of 9 officers and 121 enlisted men.

Tiger's propulsion system consisted of a pair of horizontal triple-expansion steam engines each driving a single screw propeller, with steam supplied by four coal-fired Thornycroft boilers. Exhaust was vented through two funnels located amidships. Tiger could steam at a top speed of 13.5 knots (25.0 km/h; 15.5 mph) at 1,300 metric horsepower (1,300 ihp). The ship had a cruising radius of about 2,580 nautical miles (4,780 km; 2,970 mi) at a speed of 9 knots (17 km/h; 10 mph).

Tiger was armed with a main battery of two 10.5 cm (4.1 in) SK L/40 guns, with 482 rounds of ammunition. One was placed on the forecastle and the other at the stern. She also carried six 37 mm (1.5 in) Maxim guns. The only armor protection carried by the ship was 8 mm (0.31 in) of steel plate on the conning tower.

== Service history ==
Tiger was laid down at the Kaiserliche Werft (Imperial Shipyard) in Danzig under the contract name Ersatz Wolf in November 1898. (Note: German warships were ordered under provisional names. Additions to the fleet were given a single letter; ships intended to replace older or lost vessels were ordered as "Ersatz (name of the ship to be replaced)".) She was launched on 15 August 1899, and at the launching ceremony, she was christened after the earlier gunboat SMS Tiger by the director of the shipyard, Kapitän zur See (Captain at Sea) Curt von Prittwitz und Gaffron. She was commissioned into active service on 3 April 1900 to begin sea trials. Testing was completed quickly, and already on 31 May, Tiger was deemed ready to deploy to East Asia. She moved to Kiel for final fitting out that lasted from 2 to 6 June, and then sailed to the North Sea, where on 16 June she was inspected by Kaiser Wilhelm II in the mouth of the Elbe river. The next day, she sailed for the Far East.

Tiger stopped in numerous European ports along the way, and in Port Said, Egypt, she met the armored cruiser SMS Fürst Bismarck, which was also on her way to East Asian waters. The two ships thereafter cruised together, stopping in Perim at the southern end of the Red Sea to replenish coal stocks from 21 to 23 July. Tiger ran aground off Obock, French Somaliland, and had to be pulled free by a tugboat from Djibouti. Tiger was not seriously damaged in the accident, but she nevertheless sailed back north to Aden to take on coal before continuing her voyage. Fürst Bismarck carried on without her.

=== East Asia Squadron ===
==== 1900–1904 ====
Tiger early in her career, c. 1901

Tiger eventually arrived in Chinese waters in late August; she stopped initially in Xiamen and Shantou between 30 August and 12 September. From there, she sailed to Hong Kong to be dry docked in Kowloon to have the damage from her grounding repaired. She thereafter sailed to Guangzhou, where she lay from 6 to 10 October. Tiger finally arrived in Qingdao in the Jiaozhou Bay Leased Territory on 22 October; this was a German colony and the main naval base for the German East Asia Squadron in the region. There, she relieved her sister ship Jaguar on patrol duty in the Yellow Sea. These operations continued as the Boxer Uprising waned, and on 10 February 1901, she was sent to steam up the Yangtze river. She patrolled the lower Yangtze for the next several months, leaving in June to visit Qingdao and then cross the Yellow Sea to visit Incheon, Korea. By mid-July, she had returned to the Yangtze. Tiger sailed to visit Nagasaki and Uraga, Japan, in December. She ended the year in Hong Kong in company with the cruisers Hertha and Bussard.

On 2 January 1902, Tiger embarked the commander of the East Asia Squadron, Vizeadmiral (VAdm—Vice Admiral) Felix von Bendemann, for a trip to Siam to visit King Chulalongkorn in Bangkok from 13 to 19 January. After returning Bendemann, Tiger spent the next several months touring south and central Chinese ports. During this period, in May, Korvettenkapitän (KK—Corvette Captain) Friedrich Schrader arrived to take command of the ship. From mid-July to mid-August, she cruised in the Bohai Sea, before returning to southern Chinese waters through much of the rest of the year. At the end of 1902, she made another trip to Bangkok. The year 1903 passed uneventfully; Tiger visited numerous Chinese ports along the country's entire coast but otherwise saw little activity of note. While visiting Guangzhou, she was inspected by the new squadron commander, VAdm Richard Geissler. In September, Schrader was replaced by Kapitänleutnant (Captain Lieutenant) Deimling.

Following the outbreak of the Russo-Japanese War in February 1904, Tiger sailed to Incheon to observe events and be available to evacuate German nationals if the need arose. After Japanese troops landed in the area later that month, she assisted in the evacuation of Germans from the city. Beginning in early March, she conducted surveys of the coastline and rivers in the area around Qingdao. In August, the badly damaged Russian battleship Tsesarevich and three destroyers sought refuge in the German naval base at Qingdao following the Russian defeat in the Battle of the Yellow Sea. As Germany was neutral, the East Asia Squadron interned Tsesarevich and the destroyers. On 13 August, the Russian ships restocked their coal supplies from three British steamers, but Fürst Bismarck and the protected cruiser Hansa cleared for action to prevent them from leaving the port. The two cruisers were joined by Tiger and her sister Luchs and the cruisers Hertha and Geier. The Russians remained interned at Qingdao for the remainder of the war. On 23 August, Tiger joined the unsuccessful search for an officer from the Admiralstab (Admiralty Staff) who had gone missing. (Note: The officer, Alfred Hentschel von Gilgenheimb, had been serving as a neutral observer during the Japanese Siege of Port Arthur; he and a French counterpart, de Cuverville, boarded a junk to sail to Shanhaiguan, but they never arrived. It was later discovered that the junk's crew murdered both men; they were subsequently arrested and executed.)

==== 1905–1914 ====
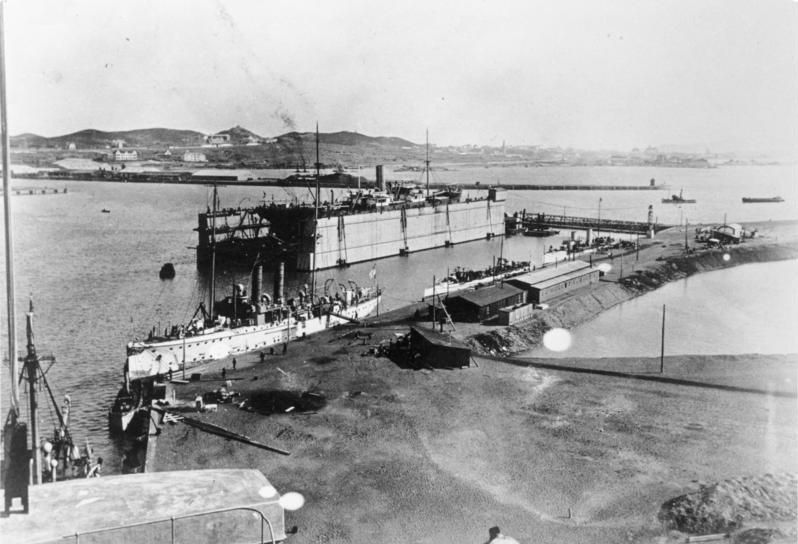
An Iltis-class ship in the harbor at Qingdao

Tiger resumed routine patrols off the coast of China in 1905, and the year passed largely uneventfully. While the ship was undergoing periodic maintenance in Shanghai, China, Deimling died on 20 November. On 15 December, Tiger returned to Incheon to embark the German consul to Korea, since the German consulate was being dissolved following Japan's conquest of the country in the war with Russia. The ship returned to Shanghai four days later, where unrest had broken out against foreigners. Tiger and the gunboat SMS Vaterland sent landing parties ashore, along with detachments from the warships of other navies, to protect their countries' nationals in the city. Jaguar was also sent to reinforce the German contingent. The situation had calmed by 30 January 1906, allowing Tiger to leave the city. She spent the rest of the year patrolling the coast of China without incident.

On 12 January 1907, Tiger joined Fürst Bismarck for a tour of the Far East to familiarize the new squadron commander, VAdm Alfred Breusing, with the region; the ships sailed as far south as the Dutch East Indies. Tiger had returned to Shanghai by mid-March, where she underwent repairs from 15 March to 15 May. The rest of the year passed uneventfully, as in previous years. Tiger saw little activity of note in 1908 as well. In June that year, KK Richard Ackermann arrived to take command of the ship. In early 1909, Tiger repeated her cruise to the Dutch East Indies, once again in company of Fürst Bismarck. The rest of the year, along with 1910 and most of 1911, passed in the same routine of port visits and annual repair periods, with little else of note transpiring.

The ship lay at Chongqing on the Yangtze when the Xinhai Revolution broke out on 10 October 1911. She was sent down the Yangtze to Hankou to protect foreign nationals in the city. There, she met her sister SMS Iltis, which had the squadron commander VAdm Günther von Krosigk aboard. Krosigk took command of the forces in the area and formed an international landing party from the warships in the city; the German contingent was strengthened by the arrival of the light cruiser SMS Emden soon thereafter. The international quarter of the city did not come under attack, however, and the men remained aboard their ships. In early November, Tiger was sent to Nanjing, but her presence there was not necessary, and by mid-December, she had been sent back to Qingdao. She spent the first four months of 1912 cruising in southern Chinese waters, after which she returned to northern ports. She did not intervene in any city, as the revolution against the Qing government quickly prevailed. On 17 November, she returned to Qingdao for a thorough overhaul that lasted until the end of January 1913. She thereafter resumed patrols along the Chinese coast.

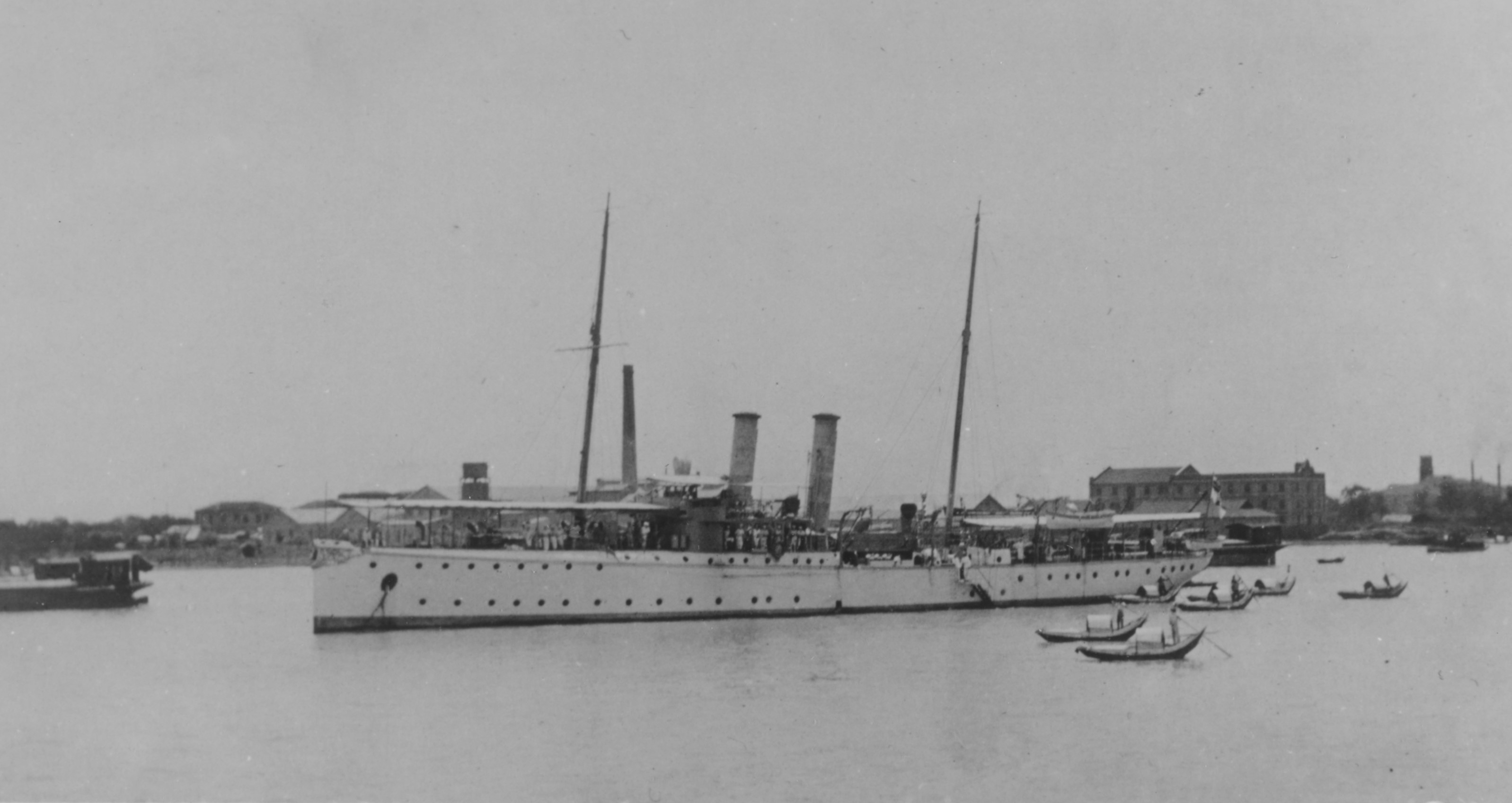
Tiger or her sister Luchs in an unidentified Chinese port, c. 1907–1909

Tiger embarked on another cruise through the region with a new squadron commander—this time VAdm Maximilian von Spee aboard the flagship SMS Scharnhorst—on 3 January 1914. The tour saw the ships visit Bangkok, the Dutch East Indies, and the Philippines. Following the voyage, she returned to Qingdao for her annual repair period, and in June, KK Karl von Bodecker arrived to take command of the ship. She then sailed to Tianjin on the Hai River, where she anchored from 25 June to 1 July. Tiger arrived back in Qingdao on 4 July and was to return to the Yangtze, but by then news of the assassination of Archduke Franz Ferdinand, the heir to the Austro-Hungarian throne had arrived. Spee cancelled Tiger's orders, awaiting the development of events in Europe. Following the start of World War I in late July, Tiger was decommissioned and disarmed on 1 August. The guns, and many of her crew, were sent to equip the Norddeutscher Lloyd post steamer Prinz Eitel Friedrich so it could be used as an auxiliary cruiser to raid enemy merchant shipping. Japan soon entered the war on the side of the Triple Entente and quickly deployed forces to capture Qingdao; in the final stage of the siege of Qingdao, the shipyard personnel in the harbor detonated scuttling charges aboard Tiger on 29 October, sinking her in the harbor. Three of her sisters were also scuttled during the siege.
