= SMS Iltis (1898) =

Iltis-class gunboat of the Imperial German Navy

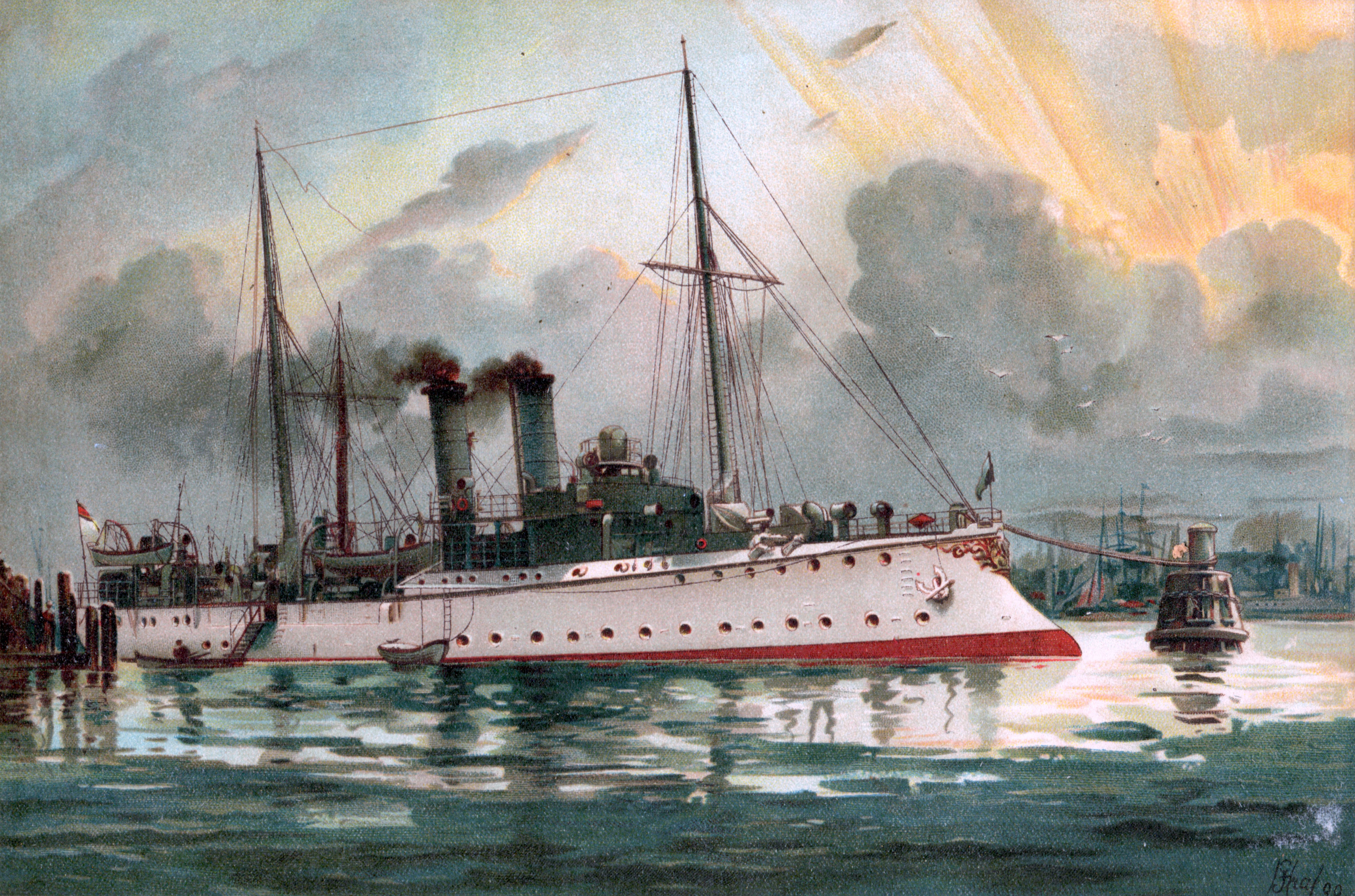
- A 1902 lithograph of Iltis

History

German Empire
- Name: SMS Iltis
- Namesake: SMS Iltis
- Builder: Schichau-Werke, Danzig
- Laid down: 27 November 1897
- Launched: 4 August 1898
- Commissioned: 1 December 1898
- Decommissioned: 7 August 1914
- Fate: Scuttled on 28 September 1914

General characteristics
- Class & type: Iltis-class gunboat
- Displacement: Designed: 894 t (880 long tons); Full load: 1,048 t (1,031 long tons)
- Length: 65.2 m (213 ft 11 in) o/a
- Beam: 9.1 m (29 ft 10 in)
- Draft: 3.59 m (11 ft 9 in)
- Installed power: 4 × Thornycroft boilers; 1,300 PS (1,300 ihp)
- Propulsion: 2 × triple-expansion steam engines; 2 × screw propellers
- Speed: 13.5 knots (25.0 km/h; 15.5 mph)
- Range: 3,080 nautical miles (5,700 km; 3,540 mi) at 9 knots (17 km/h; 10 mph)
- Complement: 9 officers; 121 enlisted men
- Armament: 4 × 8.8 cm (3.5 in) SK L/30 guns; 6 × 37 mm (1.5 in) Maxim guns
- Armor: Conning tower: 8 mm (0.31 in)

SMS Iltis was the lead ship of the Iltis class of gunboats built for the German Kaiserliche Marine (Imperial Navy) in the late 1890s and early 1900s. The ships were built to modernize the German gunboat force used to patrol the German colonial empire. They were ordered in three groups of two ships, each pair incorporating design improvements. Iltis, along with Jaguar, was armed with a main battery of four 8.8 cm (3.5 in) guns, had a top speed of 13.5 knots (25.0 km/h; 15.5 mph), and could cruise for more than 3,000 nautical miles (5,560 km; 3,450 mi).

After entering service in 1899, Iltis was deployed to the East Asia Squadron based in Qingdao, China. The following year, the Boxer Uprising broke out in China, and Iltis was heavily involved in the initial operations by the Eight Nation Alliance to suppress the Boxers, and then fight Qing troops supporting them. Iltis contributed soldiers to landing parties to secure Tientsin, and in June 1900, she saw significant fighting at the Battle of the Taku Forts, leading the naval assault on the forts guarding the entrance to the Hai River. During the action, Iltis received numerous hits and suffered relatively heavy casualties, including the first German naval officer killed in action. The ship's captain, Wilhelm von Lans, was seriously wounded during the battle and received the Pour le Merite for his actions. Iltis was similarly decorated.

Iltis saw no further action for the remainder of her time in East Asian waters, though her crew remained on alert during the Xinhai Revolution against the Qing government in 1911 and 1912. After the start of World War I in July 1914, Iltis was disarmed; some of her weapons and crew were sent to convert a captured Russian merchant vessel into the auxiliary cruiser Cormoran, while the rest were used to strengthen the defenses of Qingdao. After the British and Japanese besieged Qingdao later that year, Iltis was scuttled on the night of 28–29 September to prevent her capture.

== Design ==
Plan and profile of the Iltis class

The German Kaiserliche Marine (Imperial Navy) abandoned gunboat construction for more a decade after Eber, launched in 1887, instead focusing on larger unprotected cruisers beginning with the Schwalbe class. By the mid-1890s, the navy began planning replacements for the older vessels of the Wolf and Habicht classes. The new ships were scheduled to begin construction by 1900, but the loss of the gunboat Iltis in a storm necessitated an immediate replacement, which was added to the 1898 naval budget. The new ship was planned to patrol the German colonial empire; requirements included engines powerful enough for the ship to steam up the Yangtze in China, where the new gunboat was intended to be deployed. Six ships were built in three identical pairs; each pair incorporated incremental improvements over the preceding set, and Iltis was one of the first pair, along with Jaguar.

Iltis was 65.2 meters (213 ft 11 in) long overall and had a beam of 9.1 m (29 ft 10 in) and a draft of 3.59 m (11 ft 9 in) forward. She displaced 894 metric tons (880 long tons) as designed and 1,048 t (1,031 long tons) at full load. The ship had a raised forecastle deck and a pronounced ram bow. Her superstructure consisted primarily of a conning tower with an open bridge atop it. She had a crew of nine officers and 121 enlisted men.

Her propulsion system consisted of a pair of horizontal triple-expansion steam engines each driving a single screw propeller, with steam supplied by four coal-fired Thornycroft boilers. Exhaust was vented through two funnels located amidships. Iltis was rated to steam at a top speed of 13.5 knots (25.0 km/h; 15.5 mph) at 1,300 metric horsepower (1,300 ihp), though she exceeded these figures in service. The ship had a cruising radius of about 3,080 nautical miles (5,700 km; 3,540 mi) at a speed of 9 knots (17 km/h; 10 mph).

Iltis was armed with a main battery of four 8.8 cm (3.5 in) SK L/30 guns, with 1,124 rounds of ammunition. Two guns were placed side-by-side on the forecastle and the other pair side-by-side near the stern. She also carried six 37 mm (1.5 in) Maxim guns. The only armor protection carried by the ship was 8 mm (0.31 in) of steel plate on the conning tower.

== Service history ==
The order for the new gunboat was placed in March 1897 with the Schichau-Werke shipyard in Danzig, under the contract name Ersatz Iltis. (Note: German warships were ordered under provisional names. Additions to the fleet were given a single letter; ships intended to replace older or lost vessels were ordered as "Ersatz (name of the ship to be replaced)".) The keel for the ship, which was named for the earlier gunboat Iltis of 1878 (and which had been in turn named after the German word for polecat), was laid down on 27 November that year. She was launched on 4 August 1898 and the director of the Kaiserliche Werft (Imperial Shipyard) in Danzig, Kapitän zur See (KzS—Captain at Sea) Friedrich von Weitersheim, gave a speech at the ceremony. A shipyard crew transferred the unfinished ship to Kiel, where her artillery was installed at the Kaiserliche Werft there. She was commissioned into the German fleet on 1 December to begin sea trials, which were completed in January 1899. Her first commander was Kapitänleutnant (KL—Captain Lieutenant) Wilhelm von Lans.

=== East Asia Squadron ===
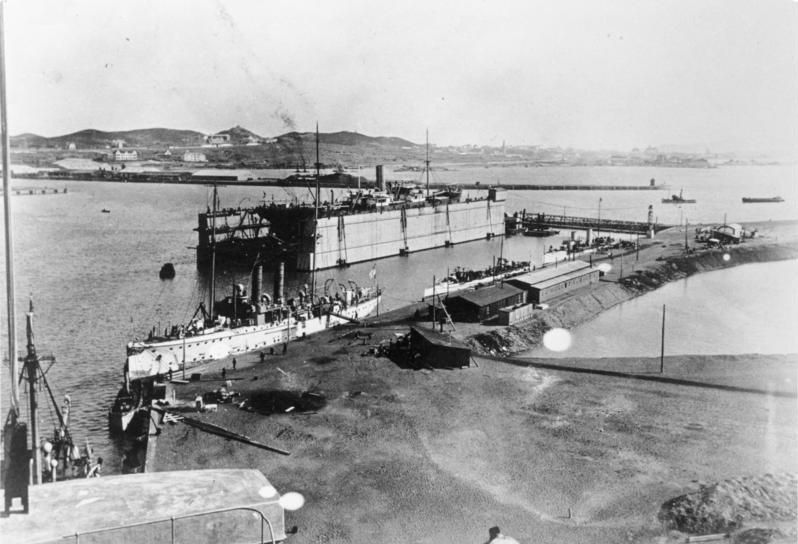
One of the Iltis-class gunboats in Qingdao

After entering service, Iltis was sent abroad to Germany's main naval force in Asia, the East Asia Squadron, in part because there were no other warships in the region that could easily enter Chinese rivers. She departed Germany on 6 February and sailed through the Mediterranean, stopping in Singapore on 27 April, and ultimately arriving in Qingdao on 18 May. On 1 June, Iltis stopped at the Promontory Lighthouse, where her namesake vessel had been wrecked, to participate in a memorial service for those who had died in the sinking. The ship then continued north to visit Russian ports including Port Arthur. From there, she stopped in Hakodate, Japan, before returning to Qingdao to join the East Asia Squadron. Iltis remained stationed at Qingdao for the next year, until the Boxer Uprising broke out in mid-May 1900. At the time, the East Asia Squadron also included the protected cruisers Kaiserin Augusta, Hansa, Hertha, and Irene, the unprotected cruiser Gefion, and the gunboat Jaguar. Vizeadmiral Felix von Bendemann commanded the squadron aboard Hertha. In response to the Boxer Uprising, the six major European colonial powers, along with Japan and the United States, formed the Eight Nation Alliance. The countries all gathered significant forces to combat the Boxers.

==== Battle of the Taku Forts ====
An illustration of Iltis firing during the Boxer Rebellion

On 29 May, Bendemann ordered Iltis to sail to the mouth of the Hai River; she arrived there two days later. The German consul in Tientsin requested the ship send a detachment to guard the consulate there, and Lans sent KL Robert Kühne (the ship's executive officer), another officer, and thirty men ashore on 4 June. Five days later, Irene arrived and sent a replacement party to Tientsin, though Kühne remained with the men from Irene; this was because Iltis was the only vessel capable of entering the Hai, which necessitated that her crew be ready for combat. By this time, the British Admiral Edward Seymour had assembled an expedition to relieve the Siege of the International Legations in Beijing, as the situation there had worsened. Bendemann, who had joined the forces gathered at the mouth of the Hai, observed that the Taku Forts guarding the entrance to the river threatened the rear of Seymour's expedition and the lines of communications with the European consulates in Tientsin. He ordered Lans to take Iltis into the river in company with the British sloop Algerine to observe the forts—which consisted of a north, northwest, south, and southwest fort, along with a so-called "beach battery"—and to suppress their guns if necessary.

Bendemann discussed potential courses of action with the other naval officers in the roadstead, but he could not persuade a majority to agree to attack the forts during a meeting on 14 June. The following day, word arrived that Chinese reinforcements were on the way, and that Europeans had been attacked in Tientsin. Bendemann sent landing parties from Hansa, Hertha, and Gefion, to reinforce the men in Tientsin, under the command of KzS Hugo von Pohl. By that time, the commanders concluded an attack on the forts was necessary, but they faced a number of constraints: the shallow depth of the Hai prevented larger ships from approaching the forts; the distance from the forts to the outer roadstead was too great for the larger ships providing gunfire support; some of the smaller gunboats were weakly armed and could not be used to directly attack the fortifications; most of the ships had their crews depleted either by the Seymour expedition or by the reinforcements sent to Tientsin. Lans nevertheless argued the forts could be captured with the forces available, so on the evening of 16 June, the Europeans issued an ultimatum demanding the Chinese temporarily abandon the forts by 02:00 on the 17th.

The Europeans planned to use Iltis and Algerine to lead the attack on the northwest fort and suppress its defenders, which the landing parties from Tientsin were to storm. The four other available gunboats would engage the remaining forts and the beach battery to occupy their defenders during the assault on the northwest fort. The Chinese disrupted the plan by opening fire at 00:50 on 17 June, more than an hour before the ultimatum was to expire, and before the Europeans had reached their intended positions. Iltis was targeted particularly heavily, in large part because the Chinese viewed her as the most dangerous warship, owing to her modern appearance. At 04:26, she received her first hit, which struck the aft funnel. Four more shells struck the ship soon thereafter, but she remained in action. By about 04:45, she and Algerine had disabled most of the Chinese guns in the northwest fort, which allowed Iltis to signal the ground forces to begin their assault. Pohl's men quickly secured the northwest fort and then immediately launched a surprise attack on the north fort, which was also successful. There they captured a pair of 15 cm (5.9 in) guns that had not been damaged in the bombardment, and they used those to support the gunboats in subsequent attacks on southern forts and the beach battery.

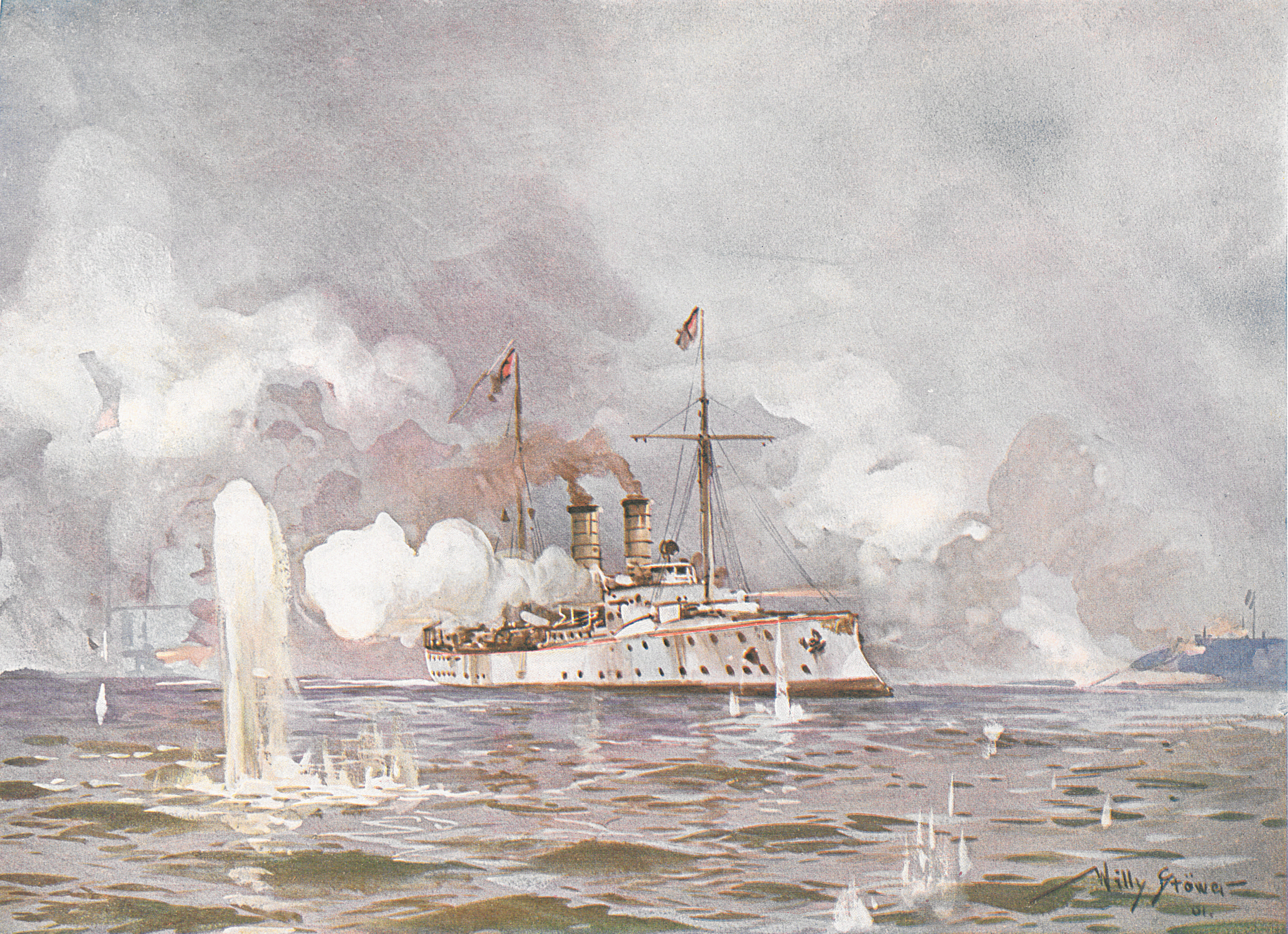
Iltis in action off Taku, by Willy Stöwer

While Pohl's men were attacking the northwest and then north forts, Iltis, Algerine, the French gunboat Lion, and the Russian gunboats Bobr and Korietz moved to their second bombardment positions to engage the southern forts; the Russian gunboat Giliak had been badly damaged and was unable to move. Iltis and Algerine briefly fired on the northern fort during this period, but quickly shifted fire to the southern fort. The Chinese defenders soon returned fire with good accuracy; beginning at about 05:45, Iltis received a series of hits, the first of which struck the base of the conning tower and killed an officer. Further hits inflicted further damage on the tower and seriously wounded Lans. Command on the ship temporarily broke down, causing her to sail past Algerine, which had already anchored at her intended bombardment position. Lans turned over command to Oberleutnant zur See (Lieutenant at Sea) Hoffmann Lamatsch Edler von Waffenstein, the deputy executive officer (as Kühne was still ashore). Waffenstein anchored the ship, but she was in front of Algerine, partially obstructing her field of fire, so Iltis had to move about 200 m (220 yd) further up. She continued to take hits from the Chinese gunners, including one that struck the stairs leading down from the conning tower roof; Lans, a doctor, and a medic were attempting to descend the stairs at the time, and were thrown to the deck when the stairs collapsed. Lans was evacuated to a steam pinnace positioned on the disengaged side of the ship, where he remained for the rest of the battle.

At around 06:00, an ammunition depot in the south fort exploded under the combined fire of Iltis, Algerine, and the captured guns in the north fort. The explosion disabled most of the large guns in the fort, which had inflicted most of the damage on Iltis; by this time, only the light guns in the fort, along with the beach battery, were still firing. A second ammunition magazine in the south fort exploded and caused resistance there to collapse at about 07:00. Soon thereafter, Iltis received another major hit from a 24 cm (9.4 in) gun of the beach battery. This shell passed completely through the ship before exploding on the riverbank. Had it exploded inside the ship, Iltis likely would have been destroyed, but it killed two men and inflicted significant damage, even though it failed to detonate. Between 07:15 and 07:30, Iltis and Algerine sent several boats to move Pohl's men from the north fort to the south side of the Hai, so they could assault the southern forts. But by this time, the morale of the Chinese garrison in the south fort had been broken, and they fled. Only the southwest fort and beach battery remained in action, but fire from a captured 21 cm (8.3 in) gun in the south fort quickly convinced the defenders of the southwest fort to flee as well. The beach battery quickly fell to the Europeans soon thereafter. Iltis then weighed anchor to withdraw to the outer roadstead, where Waffenstein reported the situation to Bendemann and transferred the wounded for care. In the course of the fighting, the ship's crew had suffered seven killed in action and eleven wounded; she had been hit twenty-one times. Lieutenant Hans Hellmann was one of the fatalities, and he was the first German naval officer to be killed in combat.

Lans was awarded the Order Pour le Merite for his actions during the battle on 24 June. A subsequent order from the imperial high command on 27 January 1903 awarded the Pour le Merite to the ship, allowing Iltis to display the honor as well. In the order in the German Imperial Gazette, Kaiser Wilhelm II included a letter to an admiral commanding the East Asia Squadron:

(As quoted in The Times 28 January 1903) By means of the picture ′Germans to the front′ which represents the honourable part taken by the officers and men of my vessels in Admiral Seymour′s march on Peking, I have honoured these services and assured to them a lasting memorial. It is in like fashion my will that the memory of the deed of my gunboat Iltis in the fight for the Ta-ku Forts shall be continually kept alive in my navy. I therefore ordain that my gunboat Iltis, as a special external distinction, is to carry on her bows, at her masthead truck, and on her boats a representation of the Order Pour le Merite.

==== Subsequent operations ====
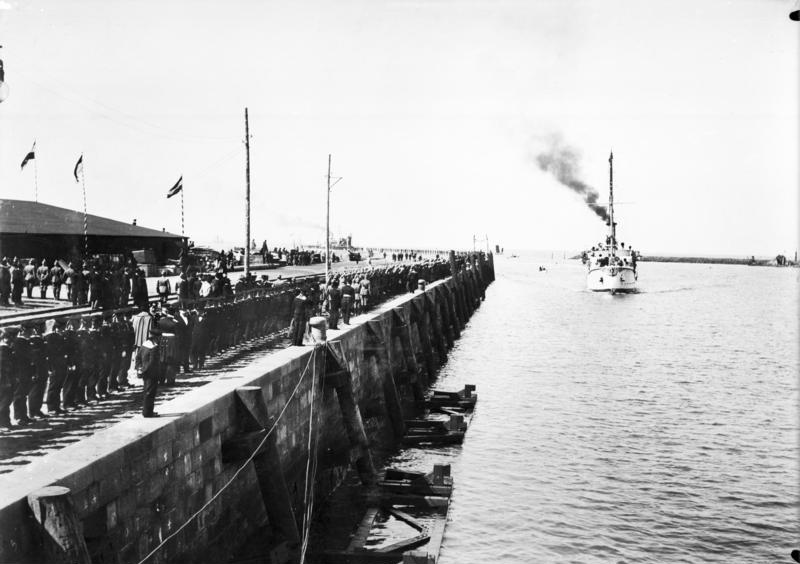
Iltis in Qingdao

Iltis moved to the Hai estuary on 18 June to be present in the event of an attack on Tanggu, which did not materialize. Kühne was recalled to take command of the ship soon thereafter. In the following weeks off the Hai, the ship's crew repaired damage as best they could with the equipment they had on hand, and then with the assistance of the shipyard in Tanggu later in July. After the situation in northwest China began to come under alliance control, Iltis left for Shanghai for permanent repairs on 6 August. Work began there eleven days later, and after work was completed, she remained in the city as a local guard ship. During this period, KL Wilhelm Sthamer arrived to take command of the ship on 24 September. Iltis got underway again in late October to sail up the Yangtze to Hankou, where she was stationed as a guard ship from 29 October 1900 to 15 April 1901. She was then relieved by her sister ship Tiger, allowing Iltis to return to Qingdao.

With the Boxer Uprising largely defeated by mid-1901, Iltis returned to the normal peacetime routine of the East Asia Squadron. For the next thirteen years, she conducted routine patrols along the Chinese coast, took part in various training exercises, and visited Japanese ports. In November 1902, Korvettenkapitän (KK—Corvette Captain) Oskar von Platen-Hallermund arrived to take command of the ship from Sthamer. She was present in Qingdao for the opening ceremony of the "new port" on 6 March 1904, during which the colonial governor, Oskar von Truppel, and the deputy squadron commander, Konteradmiral (Rear Admiral) Henning von Holtzendorff, came aboard the ship. KK Hans Küsel became the ship's captain in November 1905. He served in the role for two years, until he was replaced in November 1907 by KK Max Lans, the younger brother of the ship's first captain. Lans used the ship to conduct extensive surveys along the Chinese coast from Qingdao to the mouth of the Yangtze, eventually covering an area of 2,500 sq nmi (8,600 km^{2}; 3,300 sq mi).

After the outbreak of the Xinhai Revolution against the Qing government on 10 October 1911, Iltis was set to Nanjing in the event that the fighting spilled over to target Europeans in the city. This proved to be unnecessary, and on 18 October, she was ordered to sail upriver to Hankou. The squadron commander, KAdm Günther von Krosigk, came aboard Iltis for the operation. After arriving in the city, she sent a landing party ashore to guard the Germans there. She remained in Hankou until March 1912, but the situation remained calm and neither the landing party or the ship saw any combat. During this period, in February 1912, KK Lothar von Gohren arrived to take command of the ship. She thereafter returned to peacetime operations. KK Fritz Sachsse, who would prove to be the ship's final commander, arrived in December 1913 to relieve Gohren.

In May 1914, Iltis underwent repairs at Shanghai that lasted for six weeks, before returning to Qingdao on 15 June. There, her deck was cut open to allow her boilers to be replaced. The ship was scheduled to be decommissioned as soon as the new gunboat Meteor, then under construction, was completed. These plans were discarded after the outbreak of World War I at the end of July. Soon after the start of hostilities, the light cruiser Emden captured the Russian steamer Ryazan and brought her back to Tsingtao. Men from the crews of Iltis, the unprotected cruiser Cormoran and the gunboat Vaterland were used to man Ryazan, which was commissioned as the auxiliary cruiser Cormoran. The remaining men from Iltis were assigned to the land defenses of the colony. The ship was formally decommissioned on 7 August. Iltis was then lashed to her sister Luchs and the two ships were scuttled together on the night of 28–29 September 1914 during the Siege of Tsingtao, after it had become clear that the garrison could not hold out indefinitely against the Japanese Army.
