= SMS Jaguar =

1898 Iltis-class gunboat

Coordinates: 36.0500°N 120.2667°E

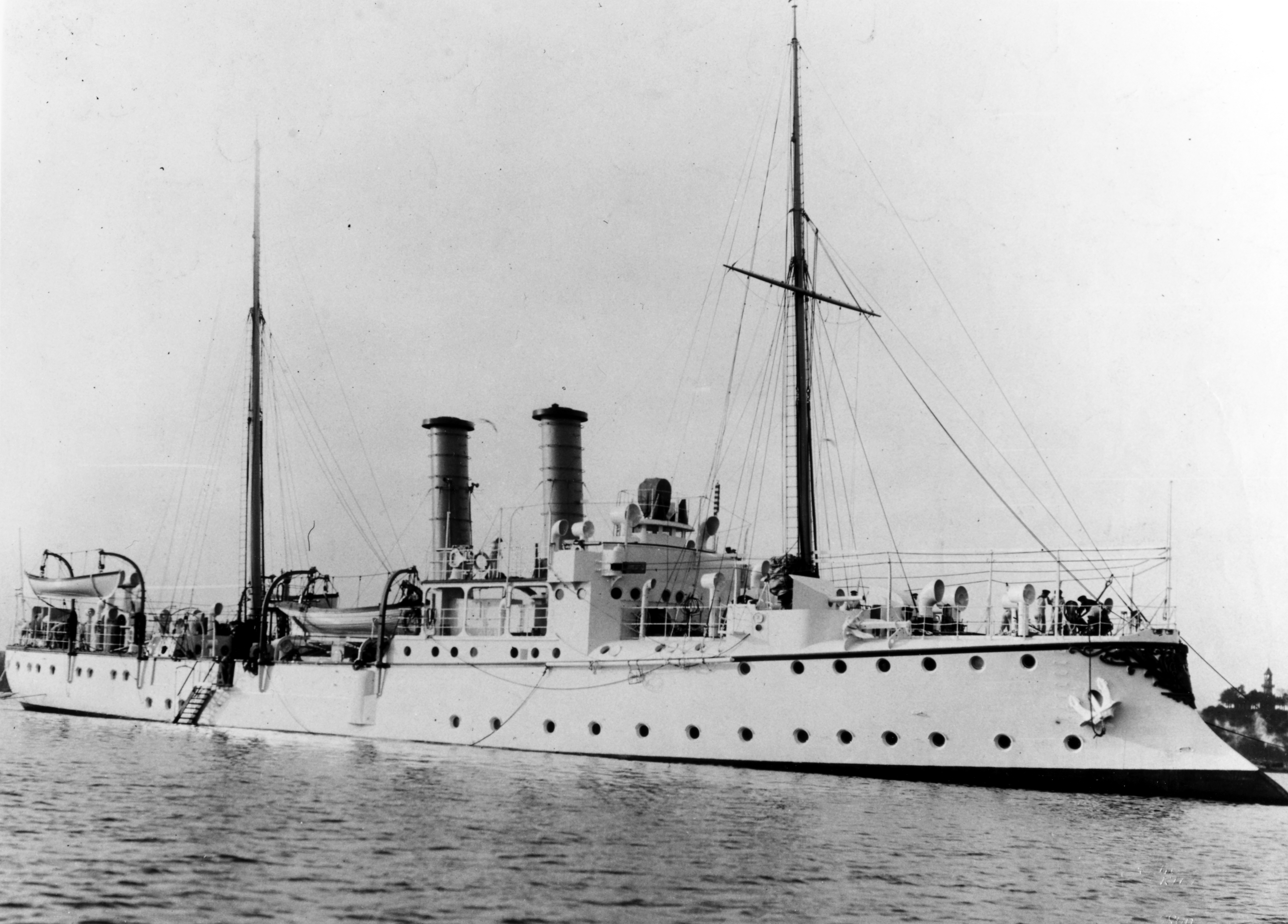
- Jaguar c. 1899

History

German Empire
- Name: SMS Jaguar
- Namesake: Jaguar
- Builder: Schichau-Werke, Danzig
- Laid down: September 1897
- Launched: 19 September 1898
- Commissioned: 4 April 1899
- Fate: Scuttled on 7 November 1914

General characteristics
- Class & type: Iltis-class gunboat
- Displacement: Designed: 894 t (880 long tons); Full load: 1,048 t (1,031 long tons)
- Length: 65.2 m (213 ft 11 in) o/a
- Beam: 9.1 m (29 ft 10 in)
- Draft: 3.59 m (11 ft 9 in)
- Installed power: 4 × Thornycroft boilers; 1,300 PS (1,300 ihp)
- Propulsion: 2 × triple-expansion steam engines; 2 × screw propellers
- Speed: 13.5 knots (25.0 km/h; 15.5 mph)
- Range: 3,080 nautical miles (5,700 km; 3,540 mi) at 9 knots (17 km/h; 10 mph)
- Complement: 9 officers; 121 enlisted men
- Armament: 4 × 8.8 cm (3.5 in) SK L/30 guns; 6 × 37 mm (1.5 in) Maxim guns
- Armor: Conning tower: 8 mm (0.31 in)

SMS Jaguar was the second member of the Iltis class of gunboats built for the German Kaiserliche Marine (Imperial Navy) in the late 1890s and early 1900s, for overseas service. The ships were built to modernize the German gunboat force that was used to patrol the German colonial empire. They were ordered in three groups of two ships, each pair incorporating design improvements. Jaguar, along with Iltis, was armed with a main battery of four 8.8 cm (3.5 in) guns, had a top speed of 13.5 knots (25.0 km/h; 15.5 mph), and could cruise for more than 3,000 nautical miles (5,560 km; 3,450 mi).

Jaguar spent the entirety of her active career as part of the East Asia Squadron, based in China. She assisted in the suppression of the Boxer Uprising in China in 1900 and 1901, being used to protect Germans in various port cities during the conflict. During the Russo-Japanese War of 1904–1905, she cruised in Korean waters to ensure that the fighting there did not affect German interests. The ship next participated in the suppression of rebellions against German rule in the Caroline Islands and German Samoa in 1908 and 1909, respectively. During the Xinhai Revolution that began in China in 1910, Jaguar patrolled several Chinese ports to be available in the event the fighting began to affect Germans in China.

Jaguar was the only vessel of the four Iltis-class ships operating in China that was kept in service after the outbreak of World War I in July 1914. She saw significant action during the Siege of Qingdao, engaging in artillery duels with Japanese field guns. With the Germans set to surrender on 8 November, Jaguar was scuttled on the night of 6–7 November.

== Design ==
Plan and profile of the Iltis class

The German Kaiserliche Marine (Imperial Navy) abandoned gunboat construction for more a decade after Eber, launched in 1887, instead focusing on larger unprotected cruisers beginning with the Schwalbe class. By the mid-1890s, the navy began planning replacements for the older vessels of the Wolf and Habicht classes. The new ships were scheduled to begin construction by 1900, but the loss of the gunboat Iltis in a storm necessitated an immediate replacement, which was added to the 1898 naval budget. The new ship was planned to patrol the German colonial empire; requirements included engines powerful enough for the ship to steam up the Yangtze in China, where the new gunboat was intended to be deployed. Six ships were built in three identical pairs; each pair incorporated incremental improvements over the preceding set, and Jaguar was one of the first pair, along with Iltis.

Jaguar was 65.2 meters (213 ft 11 in) long overall and had a beam of 9.1 m (29 ft 10 in) and a draft of 3.59 m (11 ft 9 in) forward. She displaced 894 metric tons (880 long tons) as designed and 1,048 t (1,031 long tons) at full load. The ship had a raised forecastle deck and a pronounced ram bow. Her superstructure consisted primarily of a conning tower with an open bridge atop it. She had a crew of 9 officers and 121 enlisted men.

Her propulsion system consisted of a pair of horizontal triple-expansion steam engines each driving a single screw propeller, with steam supplied by four coal-fired Thornycroft boilers. Exhaust was vented through two funnels located amidships. Jaguar was rated to steam at a top speed of 13.5 knots (25.0 km/h; 15.5 mph) at 1,300 metric horsepower (1,300 ihp), though she exceeded these figures in service. The ship had a cruising radius of about 3,080 nautical miles (5,700 km; 3,540 mi) at a speed of 9 knots (17 km/h; 10 mph).

Jaguar was armed with a main battery of four 8.8 cm (3.5 in) SK L/30 guns, with 1,124 rounds of ammunition. Two guns were placed side-by-side on the forecastle and the other pair side-by-side near the stern. She also carried six 37 mm (1.5 in) Maxim guns. The only armor protection carried by the ship was 8 mm (0.31 in) of steel plate on the conning tower.

== Service history ==
The keel for Jaguar was laid down at the Schichau-Werke shipyard in Danzig in September 1897, under the contract name Ersatz Hyäne, as a replacement for that vessel. (Note: German warships were ordered under provisional names. Additions to the fleet were given a single letter; ships intended to replace older or lost vessels were ordered as "Ersatz (name of the ship to be replaced)".) Her completed hull was launched on 19 September 1898 and she was christened by the director of the shipyard, Kapitän zur See (Captain at Sea) Curt von Prittwitz und Gaffron. She was named for the eponymous cat species. After completing fitting-out work, the new gunboat was commissioned into active service on 4 April 1899 to begin sea trials. Her initial testing lasted until 25 May, when she was pronounced ready for duty. The ship's first commander was Kapitänleutnant (KL—Captain Lieutenant) Hugo Kinderling.

=== East Asia Squadron ===
==== 1899–1901 ====
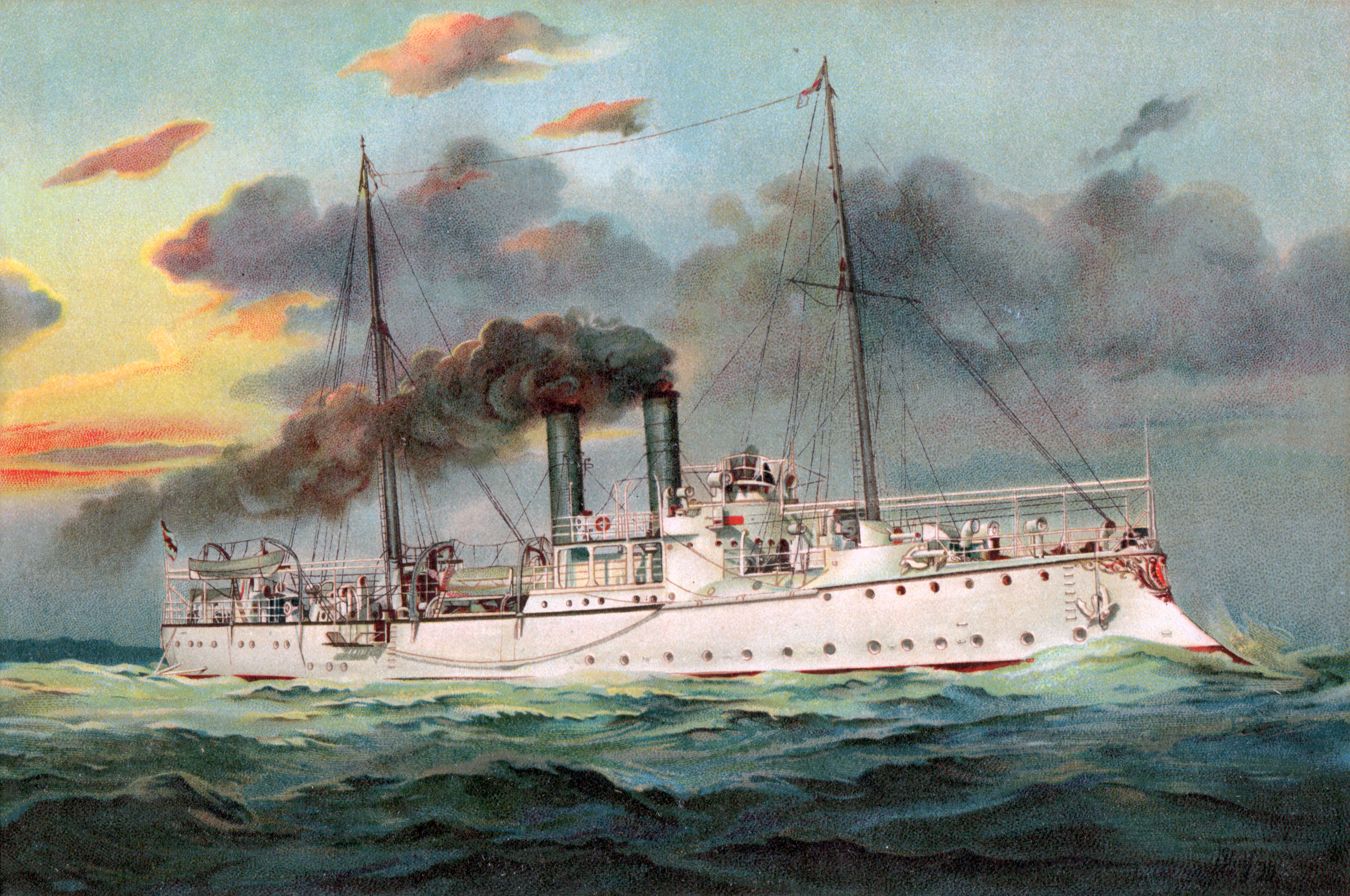
A 1902 lithograph of Jaguar

Jaguar left Kiel, Germany, on 1 June for a deployment to join the East Asia Squadron in Qing China. While in Colombo, British Ceylon, Jaguar received orders to sail first to the Caroline and Mariana Islands in the central Pacific Ocean. Spain had sold the island chains (with the exception of Guam, which was taken by the United States) after its defeat in the Spanish–American War, under the terms of the German-Spanish Treaty. Jaguar was to raise the German flag on the islands. The ship stopped in Singapore on the way, and then sailed east through the Dutch East Indies, passing through Makassar and Ambon Island on the way. She then sailed through the Torres Strait before stopping in Herbertshöhe in German New Guinea on 13 September. The town was at that time the capital of the colony, and while there, Jaguar embarked the colonial governor, Rudolf von Bennigsen, to oversee the flag-raising ceremonies. Jaguar and a government steamship carrying a detachment of local police sailed from Herbertshöhe on 29 September. They stopped first in Pohnpei in the Caroline Islands on 13 October, followed by Yap in the Palau Islands on 3 November, and finally Saipan in the Marianas on 17 November. Jaguar then departed to join the East Asia Squadron; she arrived in Shanghai, China, on 30 November, where she underwent repair work after her long voyage from Germany. She finally arrived in Qingdao in the German-controlled Kiautschou Bay Leased Territory, where she formally joined the East Asia Squadron.

Jaguar thereafter embarked on routine cruises in the Far East, patrolling both the coast and rivers of China. In February and March 1900, she sailed up the Yangtze river as far as Hankow, and in April and May she visited ports in Japan. The outbreak of the Boxer Uprising soon thereafter forced her to return to China in early June, and she entered the lower Yangtze to protect Germans in the area. At the time, the East Asia Squadron also included the protected cruisers Kaiserin Augusta, Hansa, Hertha, and Irene, and the unprotected cruiser Gefion. Kaiser Wilhelm II decided that an expeditionary force was necessary to reinforce the Eight Nation Alliance that had formed to defeat the Boxers. The expeditionary force consisted of the four Brandenburg-class battleships, six cruisers, ten freighters, three torpedo boats, and six regiments of marines, under the command of Marshal Alfred von Waldersee. In the meantime, Jaguar remained in the Yangtze until after the Battle of the Taku Forts, when she was sent to Tanggu to guard the area while ships of the Eight Nation Alliance sent landing parties ashore. Kinderling was placed in charge of supervising the transfer of men and supplies. On 23 October, Jaguar was detached to return to Qingdao, though she then sailed for Incheon, Korea, where she remained until December. By 20 December, she had returned to guard duty in Shanghai. On 4 January 1901, the ship left Shanghai for southern China, and she spent much of the next six months in the Xi River in company with her sister ship Luchs; she also lay at Guangzhou at times through this period. While in southern Chinese waters, Jaguar also visited Beihai.

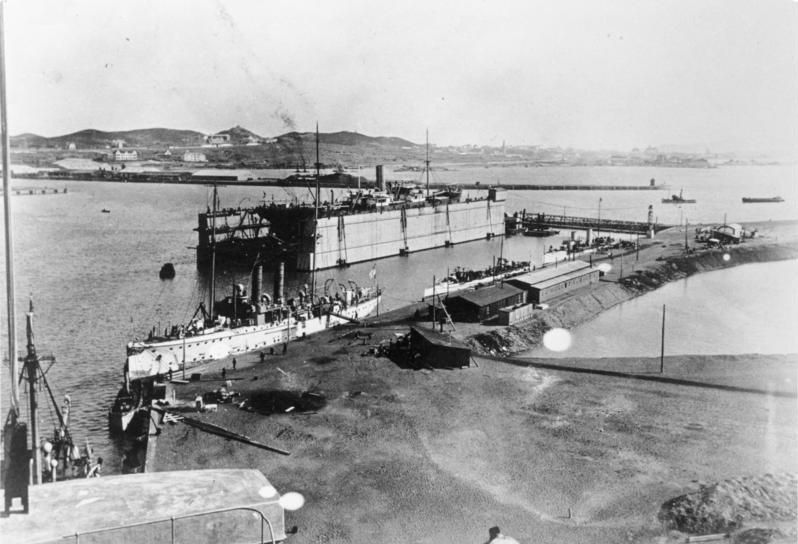
One of the Iltis-class gunboats in Qingdao

By July, the crisis in China had largely passed, allowing Jaguar to return to Japanese ports, at times with the rest of the East Asia Squadron. These visits continued until the end of August. Jaguar thereafter cruised in the Bohai Sea through February 1902. During this period, she supported the re-embarkation of Waldersee's expeditionary force to return to Germany. In March, she steamed to Nagasaki, Japan, for periodic maintenance, after which she had to return to the Yangtze to guard German interests during a new period of unrest. After the threat of violence subsided, Jaguar returned to Japanese waters, and from 8 September to the end of December, she lay at Qingdao, interrupted only by a cruise to the Bohai Sea in early December, where she surveyed a section of the Hai River. During that period, the ship briefly came under the command of the executive officer, KL Max Kühne from September to November; he was then replaced by Korvettenkapitän (KK—Corvette Captain) Karl Wilbrandt. Jaguar then cruised south along the coast of China, visiting ports as far south as the Gulf of Tonkin.

==== 1903–1914 ====
By 8 June 1903, Jaguar had returned to Qingdao, though she remained there only briefly before resuming her tour of Chinese ports. These voyages ran into 1904, and concluded finally on 21 March; she lay at Qingdao for the following three months before resuming patrols along the Chinese coast. Later in 1904, during the Russo-Japanese War, Jaguar was sent to Incheon to protect German interests during the fighting in the area. She thereafter returned to southern Chinese waters, where she remained through the end of the year. She returned to Qingdao for repairs in April and May 1905. The ship resumed her routine of cruises to various ports in the region, interrupted by another stay in Qingdao in November and December, after which she made another visit to Japan. The year 1906 passed uneventfully for Jaguar, until mid-December, when unrest in Shanghai that threatened Europeans in the city prompted the squadron commander to send Jaguar there. The only other event of note was the arrival of KK Harry von Posodowsky-Wehner in May to take command of the ship.

The years 1907 and 1908 passed largely uneventfully; the ship's activities followed the same routine of peacetime cruises as previous years. The only interruption came in late 1908, when she was sent to the Caroline Islands in response to unrest against German rule. She sailed from Shanghai on 15 October and proceeded first to Herbertshöhe, where she embarked the governor, Albert Hahl. In Pohnpei, she joined the unprotected cruiser Condor, and the two ships suppressed the rebellion. During this operation, the ships carried a contingent of Melanesian infantry to the island of Pohnpei to suppress tensions between rival factions on the island. Jaguar returned Hahl and the infantry contingent to Herbertshöhe on 9 December; she stayed there from 13 to 27 December, before embarking on a tour of Germany's colonial holdings in the central Pacific. After arriving back in Herbertshöhe on 12 March 1909, the ship received orders to sail to Apia, German Samoa, where unrest had broken out. Jaguar arrived off the island on 28 March. There, she joined the light cruisers Leipzig and Arcona, which had also been sent to suppress the uprising. The rebels were defeated quickly, and the leaders were deported to Jaluit Atoll in the Marshalls in early April. Jaguar was used to carry them to Jaluit. By May, the ship had arrived back in Chinese waters.

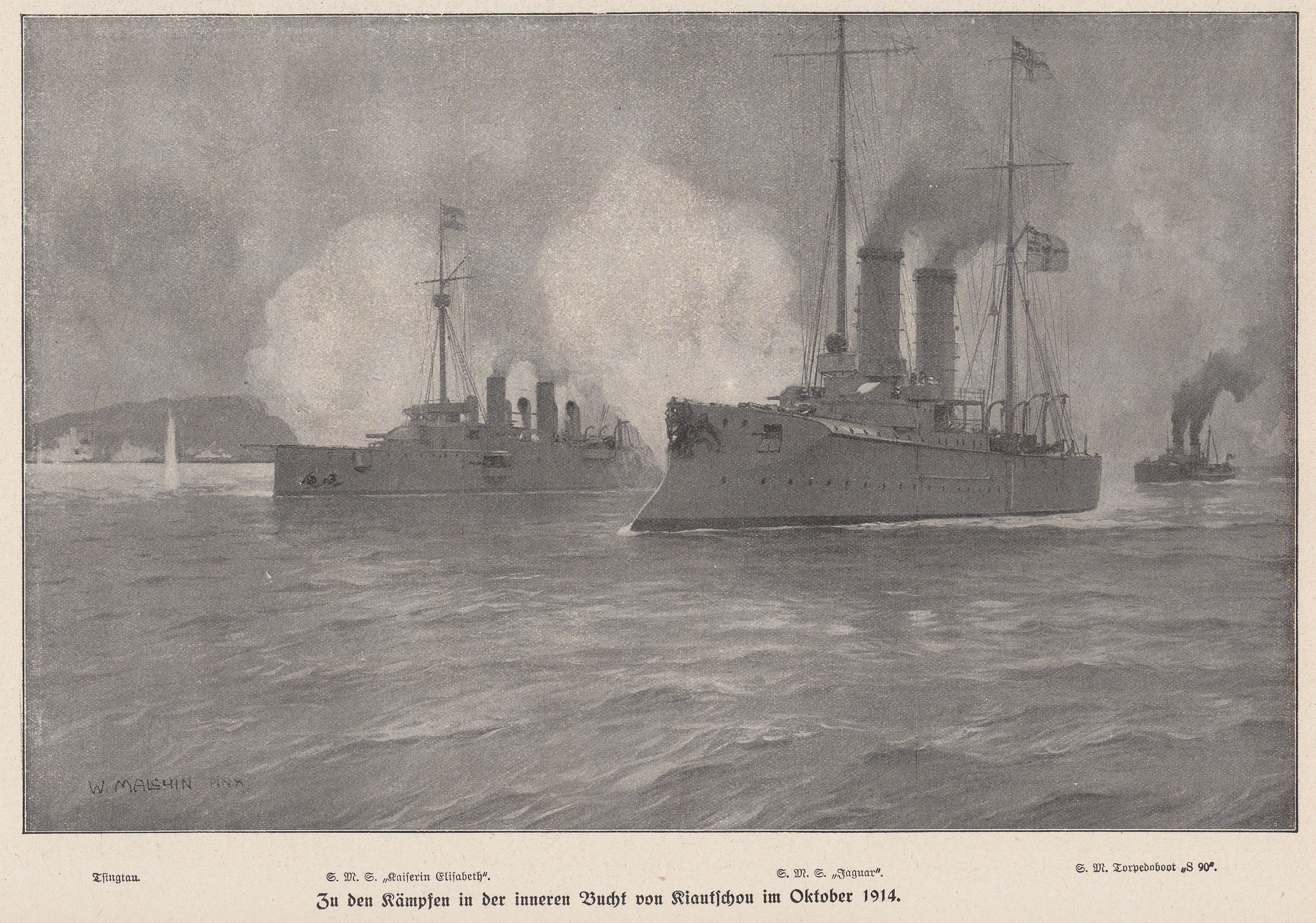
Depiction of Jaguar (center), the torpedo boat S90 (right background) and the Austro-Hungarian cruiser Kaiserin Elisabeth (left) in action against Anglo-Japanese forces

By December 1910, another period of violence had broken out in central China, this time in Hankou. Jaguar was sent to suppress the unrest, along with the British river gunboat HMS Thistle, a force of international volunteers, and Chinese army units. Jaguar remained in the city until 25 February 1911, when she sailed back to Qingdao, where she remained until the end of July. She thereafter returned to cruising in Chinese waters until the outbreak of the Xinhai Revolution on 10 October. In response, Jaguar sailed to Fuzhou in November to guard the German consulate there. The ship remained in the port for the next five months, leaving only on 28 April for a seven-week stay in Qingdao. She resumed cruises in south China for the rest of the year. The ship's activities in 1913 followed the same peacetime routine as prior years. During a cruise in the Yangtze in February 1914, Jaguar struck a rock that punched a hole in her hull; her crew was able to repair it temporarily, but she had to be recalled to Qingdao for permanent repairs on 19 July. She was sent to be dry docked in a British floating dry dock in Shanghai, but after the July Crisis spiraled into World War I at the end of the month, Jaguar was refloated on 31 July and departed for Qingdao. The ship's captain, KK Friedrich Lüring, and a small detachment remained behind to establish a station in the city. The ship's executive officer took the ship back to Qingdao, where he was relieved by KK Karl von Bodecker.

==== World War I ====
Jaguar reached Qingdao on 4 August, where she was the only major German warship still in service; her sisters Luchs, Tiger, and Iltis had all been disarmed and their crews transferred to other purposes. Jaguar was placed under the command of the colonial governor, who assumed control of the colony's defenses. Jaguar had two of her 8.8 cm guns removed to contribute to the armament of the auxiliary cruiser Prinz Eitel Friedrich. Jaguar had other alterations made to reduce her vulnerability to damage, including removing her mainmast to prevent any of her signal lines from fouling her screws if the mast was damaged. A spotting top was also installed on her foremast to assist her gunners in directing their fire.

After the siege of Qingdao began later that year, Jaguar bombarded enemy positions ashore to support the German defenses, and she frequently engaged in artillery duels with Japanese field guns. She also engaged Japanese naval forces, including blocking the rescue of the destroyer Shirotae. During one action on 4 October, she received a hit from a 12 or 15 cm (4.7 or 5.9 in) shell on her bow, but it inflicted negligible damage and she remained in service. In the course of the siege, she fired around 2,200 shells from her 8.8 cm guns. During the fighting, the Japanese seaplane carrier Wakamiya launched air attacks with her four Farman MF.11 seaplanes, including an attempting bombing of Jaguar and the Austro-Hungarian protected cruiser Kaiserin Elisabeth. As the German garrison was scheduled to surrender on 8 November, Jaguar was scuttled on the night of 6–7 November 1914 at a depth of about 60 m (200 ft) in Jiaozhou Bay, on the final day of the siege of Qingdao. Three of her sisters were also scuttled during the siege.
