= SMS Luchs =

German naval warship

Coordinates: 36.0500°N 120.2667°E

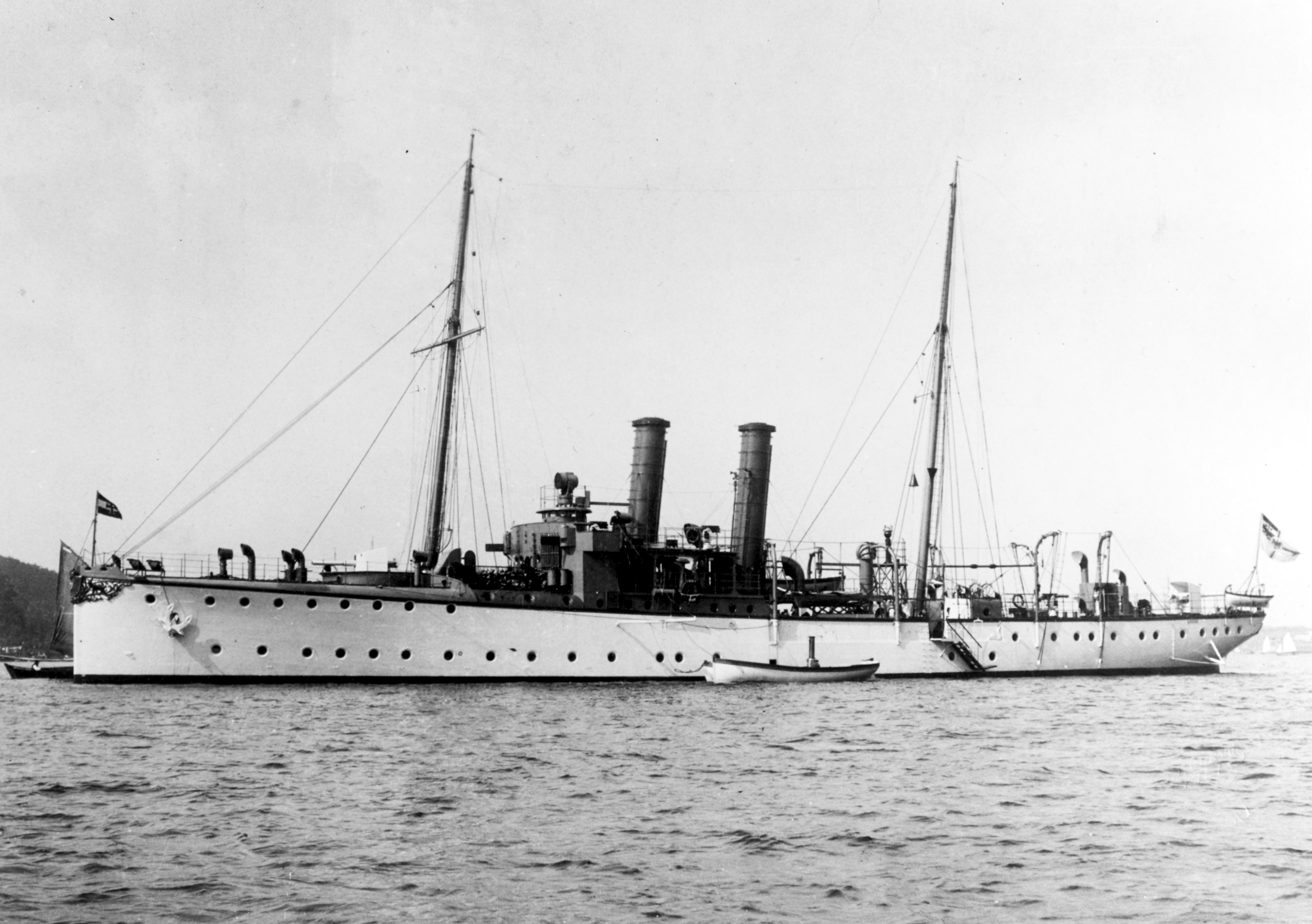
- Luchs c. 1900

History
- Namesake: German for "lynx"
- Laid down: December 1898
- Launched: 18 October 1899
- Commissioned: 15 May 1900
- Decommissioned: 6 August 1914
- Fate: Scuttled 28 September 1914

General characteristics
- Class & type: Iltis-class gunboat
- Displacement: Designed: 894 t (880 long tons); Full load: 1,108 t (1,091 long tons)
- Length: 65.2 m (213 ft 11 in) o/a
- Beam: 9.1 m (29 ft 10 in)
- Draft: 3.56 m (11 ft 8 in)
- Installed power: 4 × Thornycroft boilers; 1,300 PS (1,300 ihp)
- Propulsion: 2 × triple-expansion steam engines; 2 × screw propellers
- Speed: 13.5 knots (25.0 km/h; 15.5 mph)
- Range: 2,580 nautical miles (4,780 km; 2,970 mi) at 9 knots (17 km/h; 10 mph)
- Complement: 9 officers; 121 enlisted men
- Armament: 2 × 10.5 cm (4.1 in) SK L/40 guns; 6 × 37 mm (1.5 in) Maxim guns
- Armor: Conning tower: 8 mm (0.31 in)

SMS Luchs was the fourth member of the Iltis class of gunboats built for the German Kaiserliche Marine (Imperial Navy) in the late 1890s and early 1900s. The ships were built to modernize the German gunboat force that was used to patrol the German colonial empire. They were ordered in three groups of two ships, each pair incorporating design improvements. Luchs, along with Tiger, was armed with a main battery of two 10.5 cm (4.1 in) guns, had a top speed of 13.5 knots (25.0 km/h; 15.5 mph), and could cruise for more than 2,500 nautical miles (4,630 km; 2,880 mi).

Initially planned to serve on the American Station, Luchs was reassigned to the East Asia Squadron in response to the Boxer Uprising in Qing China in 1900. After arriving, some of her men and guns were transferred to Schamien, which was purchased to serve as a river gunboat during the fighting in China. During the Russo-Japanese War in 1904, Luchs participated in the internment of Russian naval forces that had stopped in the German naval base at Qingdao. The ship spent the next several years patrolling in East Asian waters. During the Xinhai Revolution in 1911–1912, Luchs was stationed in several cities to protect foreign nationals in China. After the start of World War I in July 1914, Luchs was disarmed; her guns and part of her crew were used to equip the steamer Prinz Eitel Friedrich as an auxiliary cruiser. Luchs was subsequently scuttled during the Siege of Qingdao in September 1914.

== Design ==
Plan and profile of the Iltis class

The German Kaiserliche Marine (Imperial Navy) abandoned gunboat construction for more a decade after Eber, launched in 1887, instead focusing on larger unprotected cruisers beginning with the Schwalbe class. By the mid-1890s, the navy began planning replacements for the older vessels of the Wolf and Habicht classes. The new ships were scheduled to begin construction by 1900, but the loss of the gunboat Iltis in a storm necessitated an immediate replacement, which was added to the 1898 naval budget. The new ship was planned to patrol the German colonial empire; requirements included engines powerful enough for the ship to steam up the Yangtze in China, where the new gunboat was intended to be deployed. Six ships were built in three identical pairs; each pair incorporated incremental improvements over the preceding set, and Luchs was one of the second pair, along with Tiger.

Luchs was 65.2 meters (213 ft 11 in) long overall and had a beam of 9.1 m (29 ft 10 in) and a draft of 3.56 m (11 ft 8 in) forward. She displaced 894 metric tons (880 long tons) as designed and 1,108 t (1,091 long tons) at full load. The ship had a raised forecastle deck and a straight stem. Her superstructure consisted primarily of a conning tower with an open bridge atop it. She had a crew of 9 officers and 121 enlisted men.

Her propulsion system consisted of a pair of horizontal triple-expansion steam engines each driving a single screw propeller, with steam supplied by four coal-fired Thornycroft boilers. Exhaust was vented through two funnels located amidships. Luchs could steam at a top speed of 13.5 knots (25.0 km/h; 15.5 mph) at 1,300 metric horsepower (1,300 ihp). The ship had a cruising radius of about 2,580 nautical miles (4,780 km; 2,970 mi) at a speed of 9 knots (17 km/h; 10 mph).

Luchs was armed with a main battery of two 10.5 cm (4.1 in) SK L/40 guns, with 482 rounds of ammunition. One was placed on the forecastle and the other at the stern. She also carried six 37 mm (1.5 in) Maxim guns. The only armor protection carried by the ship was 8 mm (0.31 in) of steel plate on the conning tower.

== Service history ==
=== 1898–1904 ===
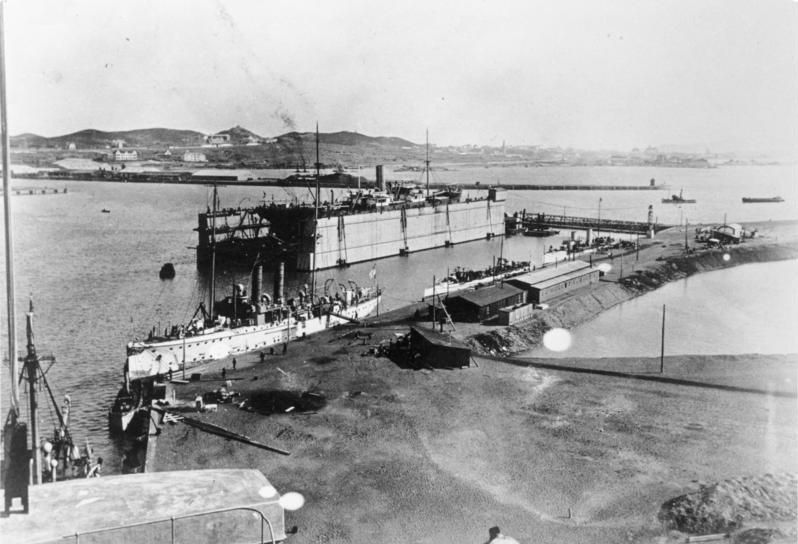
An Iltis-class ship in the harbor at Qingdao

Luchs was laid down at the Kaiserliche Werft (Imperial Shipyard) in Danzig in December 1898 under the provisional name "Ersatz Habicht". (Note: German warships were ordered under provisional names. Additions to the fleet were given a single letter; ships intended to replace older or lost vessels were ordered as "Ersatz (name of the ship to be replaced)".) She was launched on 18 October 1899 and curiously, at the ceremony, her name was misspelled as Lux. By the time she was commissioned into active service on 15 May 1900, her name had been corrected. Her first commander was Korvettenkapitän (KK—Corvette Captain) Harald Dähnhardt. The ship thereafter began sea trials. While still on her initial testing, she was assigned to the American Station, along with the protected cruiser Vineta and the unprotected cruiser Geier. But already on 30 June, Luchs' orders were changed and she was diverted to join the German naval forces in the Far East responding to the Boxer Uprising in Qing China.

After completing her trials, the ship sailed from Kiel, Germany, on 7 July. While on the way, she met the main element of the German fleet being sent to Chinese waters, centered on the four Brandenburg-class battleships, in Port Said, Egypt. Luchs had a machinery breakdown soon thereafter, however, and had to stop in Aden for repairs from 1 to 9 August. She arrived in Singapore on 29 August and thereafter joined the East Asia Squadron. The squadron commander, aboard his flagship the armored cruiser Fürst Bismarck, ordered Luchs to go to Guangzhou to secure German interests in southern China during the Boxer Uprising. After arriving there on 20 October, she contributed men and weapons to the gunboat Schamien, which had been purchased to assist in suppressing the Boxers.

In late February 1901, Luchs was relieved by her sister ship Jaguar, allowing the former to sail to Tanggu to assist in the withdrawal of the East Asia Expeditionary Corps. By this time, the Boxer Uprising had been largely defeated. After several weeks at Qingdao and then Shanghai, Luchs was sent up the Yangtze river as far as Hankou, where she remained until early April 1902. While at Hankou, in October 1901, was temporarily replaced by Kapitänleutnant (KL—Captain Lieutenant) Ernst-Oldwig von Natzmer, who was in turn replaced by KK Georg Wuthmann in November. She then joined the unprotected cruisers Schwalbe and Geier at Ningbo, where unrest had broken out. Luchs was soon released, however, and by the end of April, she had arrived in Hong Kong for periodic maintenance that lasted until early June. She spent the next four months patrolling southern Chinese ports, and during this period she also sailed to visit Japan. In November, she embarked the new squadron commander, Vizeadmiral Richard Geissler for a cruise up the Yangtze to Hankou.

KL Ernst Ewers took command of the ship in January 1903, though he served as captain for just two months. In February, Tiger repeated the river cruise to Hankou, this time carrying Konteradmiral (KAdm—Rear Admiral) Friedrich von Baudissin, the squadron's deputy commander. The ship thereafter returned to Shanghai for periodic maintenance. She spent the next year touring southern Chinese ports, and only returned to Shanghai for her next annual repair period that lasted from June to August 1904. By that time, the Russo-Japanese War had broken out. In August, the badly damaged Russian battleship Tsesarevich and three destroyers sought refuge in the German naval base at Qingdao following the Russian defeat in the Battle of the Yellow Sea. As Germany was neutral, the East Asia Squadron interned Tsesarevich and the destroyers. On 13 August, the Russian ships restocked their coal supplies from three British steamers, but the armored cruiser Fürst Bismarck and the protected cruiser Hansa cleared for action to prevent them from leaving the port. The two cruisers were then reinforced by Luchs and her sister Tiger and the cruisers Hertha and Geier. Luchs thereafter resumed routine cruises in East Asia, and in November, KL Johannes Hartog became the ship's captain.

=== 1905–1914 ===
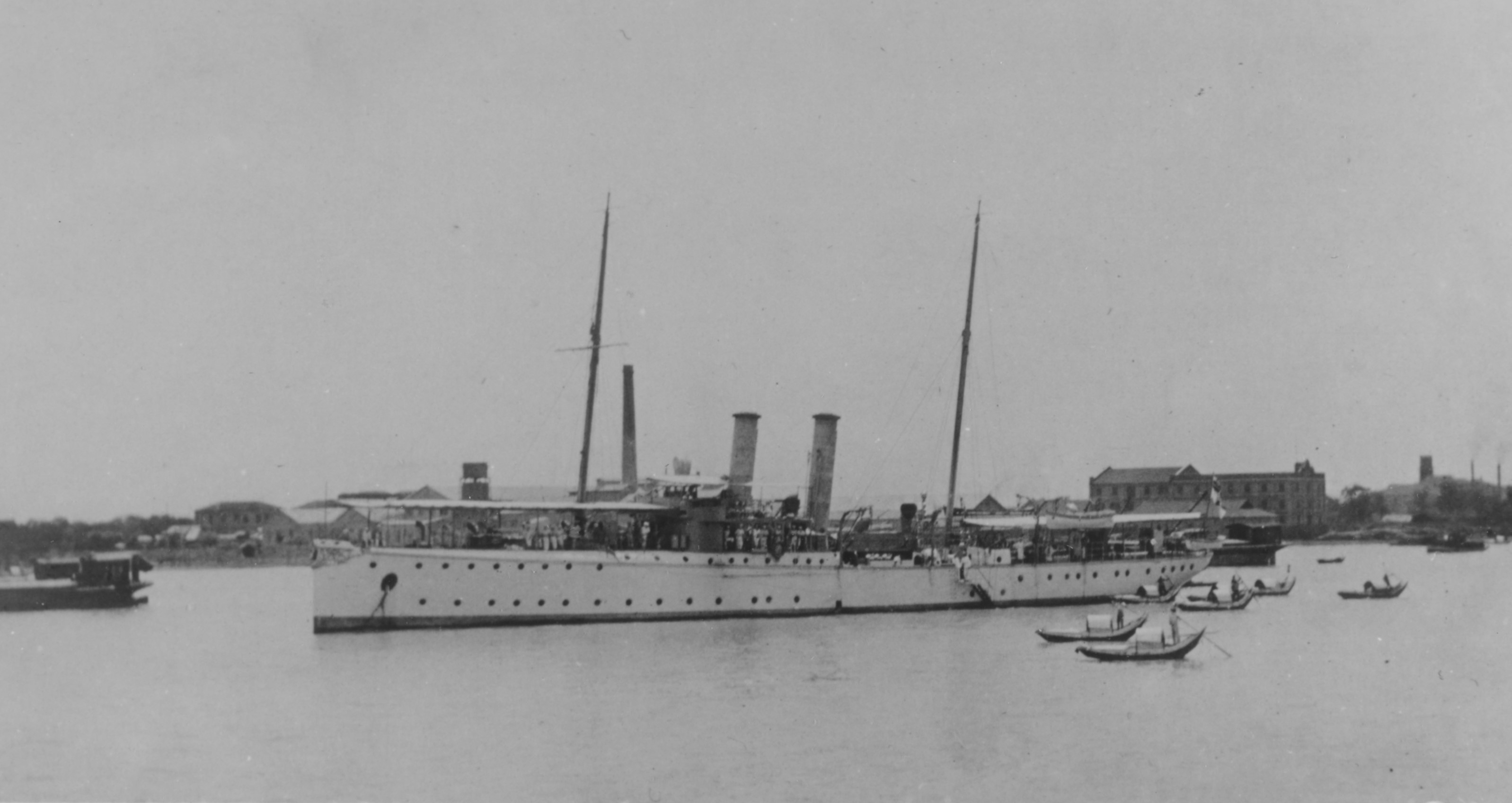
Luchs or her sister Tiger in an unidentified Chinese port, c. 1907–1909

In 1905, Luchs conducted her normal routine of peacetime cruises through the East Asia station, including picking up the new squadron commander, KAdm Alfred Breusing in Bangkok, Siam, in November. Breusing was again aboard the ship for a voyage up the Yangtze to Hankou in May 1906. The rest of the year passed uneventfully for Luchs, and in March 1907, she returned to Qingdao for an overhaul that lasted into May. On 25 May, she sailed to try to assist the French armored cruiser Chanzy, which had run aground off Zhoushan, but the French refused German assistance. In January 1908, Luchs embarked the squadron commander and his staff in the mouth of the Mekong river in southern French Indochina and took them to Siam to make a formal visit to King Chulalongkorn in Bangkok. The rest of the year passed uneventfully for Luchs, with the exception of the November arrival of KK Karl von Hornhardt, the ship's next captain. The ship spent December 1909 and early January 1910 in Hong Kong for the Christmas and New Year's festivities in company with the armored cruiser Scharnhorst and the light cruiser Leipzig. In January, Scharnhorst, Leipzig, and Luchs went on a tour of East Asian ports, including Bangkok, Manila, and stops in Sumatra and North Borneo. By 22 March, the ships had returned to the German port at Qingdao.

Later in 1910, significant unrest in Hubei province in central China prompted the Germans to send Luchs, her sister Iltis, and the river gunboat Otter to protect German interests there, along with naval forces from other countries. In January 1911, the squadron commander—KAdm Erich Gühler—died of typhus, and Luchs sent men to escort his body from the consulate in Hong Kong to the Norddeutscher Lloyd steamship Bülow to be taken back to Germany. The procession also included men from the gunboat SMS Tsingtau and a British contingent. On 1 November, Luchs resumed cruising in the region before entering the Yangtze for a repair period at Hankou. The city was at the center of the Xinhai Revolution, which would go on to topple the Qing dynasty. The ship was later sent to Nanjing and Shanghai to protect foreign nationals in those cities, remaining there for the next year. These duties were interrupted by a trip to Japan in July 1912. In late 1912 and early 1913, she made another cruise in the Dutch East Indies before returning to various ports in China to continue to guard against unrest during the revolution.

In mid-July 1914, Luchs was in the shipyard in Shanghai undergoing periodic maintenance when she received orders to return to Qingdao immediately. She was to join Iltis and the torpedo boat S90 to defend the harbor. Following the outbreak of World War I at the end of the month, Luchs and Tiger were disarmed to equip the Norddeutscher Lloyd post steamer Prinz Eitel Friedrich so it could be used as an auxiliary cruiser to raid enemy merchant shipping. The commander of Luchs, KK Thierichens, left the ship to command Prinz Eitel Friedrich, and many men from both gunboats were sent to man the cruiser, which sailed on 6 August to join the main elements of the East Asia Squadron. Luchs, meanwhile, was decommissioned and laid up initially in the outer harbor. She was later towed into the inner harbor, where on the night of 28–29 September during the Siege of Qingdao, she was scuttled at the direction of the leader of the shipyard there. Three of her sisters were also scuttled during the siege, including Iltis which was scuttled the same day as Luchs.
