= Iltis-class gunboat =

Class of German gunboat of the 1890s and 1900s

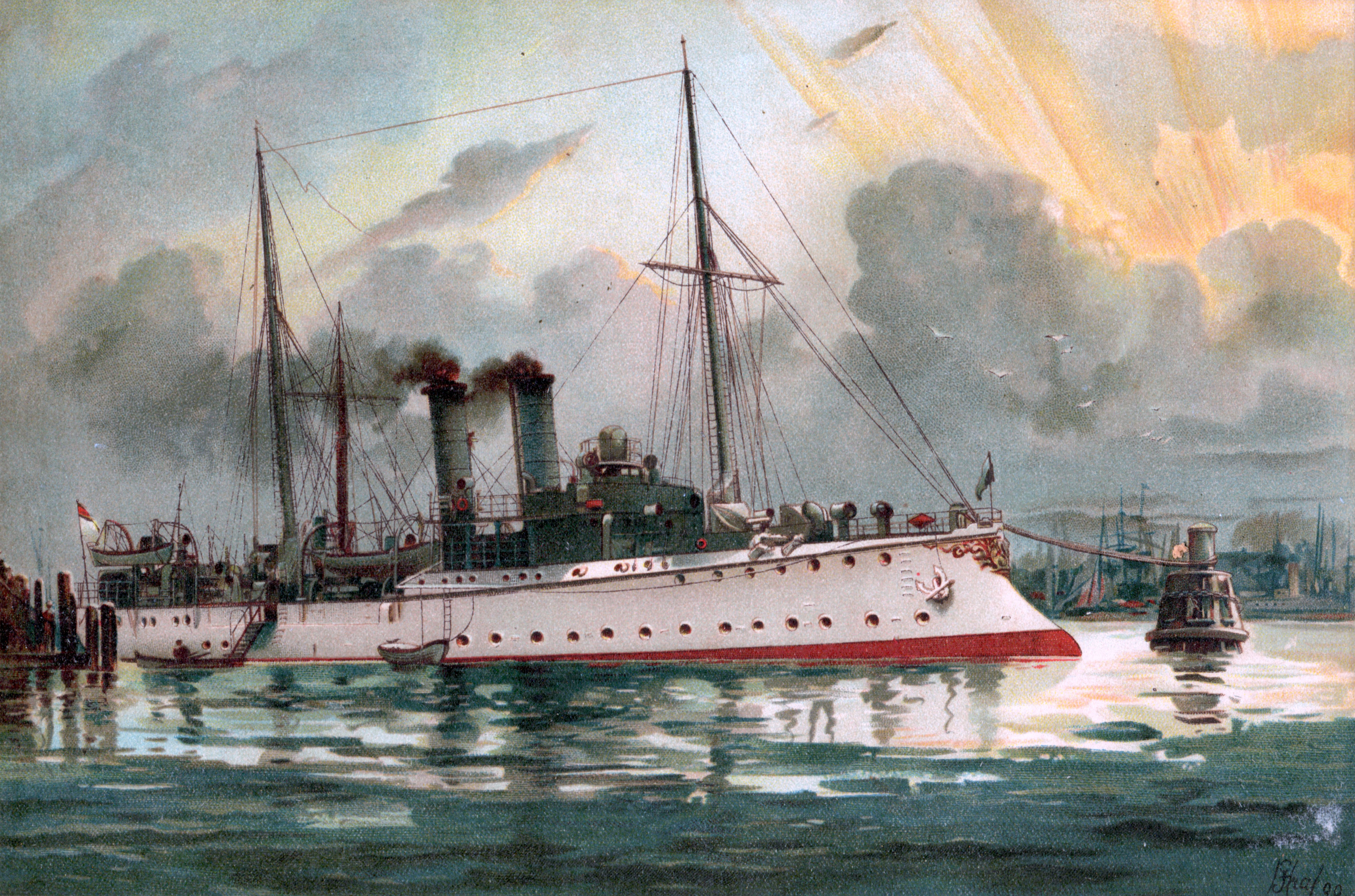
- A 1902 lithograph of Iltis

Class overview
- Preceded by: SMS Loreley
- Succeeded by: SMS Meteor
- Built: 1897–1903
- In commission: 1898–1926
- Completed: 6
- Lost: 5
- Scrapped: 1

General characteristics
- Type: Gunboat
- Displacement: Designed: 894 t (880 long tons); Full load: 1,048 t (1,031 long tons)
- Length: 65.2 m (213 ft 11 in) o/a
- Beam: 9.1 m (29 ft 10 in)
- Draft: 3.59 m (11 ft 9 in)
- Installed power: 4 × Thornycroft boilers; 1,300 PS (1,300 ihp)
- Propulsion: 2 × triple-expansion steam engines; 2 × screw propellers
- Speed: 13.5 knots (25.0 km/h; 15.5 mph)
- Range: 3,080 nautical miles (5,700 km; 3,540 mi) at 9 knots (17 km/h; 10 mph)
- Complement: 9 officers; 121 enlisted men
- Armament: 4 × 8.8 cm (3.5 in) SK L/30 guns; 6 × 37 mm (1.5 in) Maxim guns
- Armor: Conning tower: 8 mm (0.31 in)
- Notes: (Note: Figures are for Iltis; other members of the class varied in some details)

The Iltis class was a group of six gunboats built for the German Kaiserliche Marine (Imperial Navy) in the late 1890s and early 1900s. The class comprised Iltis, the lead ship, Jaguar, Tiger, Luchs, Panther, and Eber. The ships were built to modernize the German gunboat force that was used to patrol the German colonial empire. They were ordered in three groups of two ships, each pair incorporating design improvements. The first pair, Iltis and Jaguar, were armed with a main battery of four 8.8 cm (3.5 in) guns and had a pronounced ram bow. The next pair, Tiger and Luchs, received two 10.5 cm (4.1 in) guns instead of the 8.8 cm weapons, and adopted a straight stem. Panther and Eber were similar, but had modifications to their hull form to improve handling.

After entering service, the first four members of the class were deployed to China as part of the East Asia Squadron, which was based in Qingdao. In 1900–1901, they became part of the Eight Nation Alliance that responded to the Boxer Uprising in China. During this conflict, Iltis saw significant action in the Battle of the Taku Forts, where she led the Allied attack on the forts, while the other three boats were used to guard Europeans in various ports or to patrol the region, and did not take part in any fighting. The subsequent careers of Iltis, Tiger, and Luchs were largely uneventful and they were disarmed early in World War I, their weapons being used to convert merchant ships into auxiliary cruisers. Jaguar was used in 1908–1909 to suppress uprisings in German colonial holdings in the central Pacific, and during World War I fought in the Siege of Qingdao. All four ships were scuttled over the course of the siege, between September and November 1914.

Panther and Eber were the only members of the class not to serve in East Asian waters. Panther was sent to the American Station, where she responded to the Markomannia incident, sinking the Haitian gunboat Crête-à-Pierrot. She next saw action in the Venezuelan crisis of 1902–1903, including the bombardment of Fort San Carlos. Transferred to German West Africa in 1907, her next major incident came in 1911, when she triggered the Agadir Crisis by stopping in Agadir, Morocco. Eber remained in reserve from 1903 to 1910, but joined Panther in Africa that year, and she was also involved in the Agadir Crisis. Panther had returned to Germany shortly before the start of World War I, and spent the conflict patrolling the western Baltic Sea. Eber, meanwhile, was used to arm the liner Cap Trafalgar as an auxiliary cruiser and was then interned in Brazil. Her crew scuttled the ship in October 1917. Panther survived the war and served briefly as a survey ship in the postwar Reichsmarine, ultimately being broken up in 1931.

== Design ==
The German Kaiserliche Marine (Imperial Navy) abandoned gunboat construction for more than a decade after the launch of an earlier Eber in 1887. General Leo von Caprivi, the chief of the Kaiserliche Admiralität (Imperial Admiralty) at the time, preferred a strategy of coastal defense, which meant concentrating the fleet in home waters and orienting it for defensive operations. The creation of the German colonial empire beginning in 1884 upended Caprivi's plans, however, and necessitated the construction of vessels that could patrol Germany's fledgling empire. Caprivi began with the two Schwalbe-class cruisers in the mid-1880s.

By the early 1890s, the navy began planning to replace the older vessels of the Wolf and Habicht classes, though they expected the Wolfs to remain in service until 1908. An early proposal in 1892 envisioned ordering four more Bussard-class cruisers on top of the six already under construction, but the idea came to nothing. The Oberkommando der Marine (Naval High Command) requested a total of nine gunboats to be operational by the end of the decade. However, the loss of the gunboat Iltis—one of the Wolf-class ships—necessitated an immediate replacement, which was added to the 1898 naval budget. The new ship was planned to patrol the German colonial empire; requirements included engines powerful enough for the ship to steam up the Yangtze in China, where she was intended to be deployed. The ship would carry only a light armament, as she was not intended to engage in combat with equal counterparts; she would only be used to patrol the colonies. Additional vessels were soon authorized, and in total six ships were built in three identical pairs, with each subsequent pair of vessels introducing incremental improvements to the class.

=== General characteristics ===
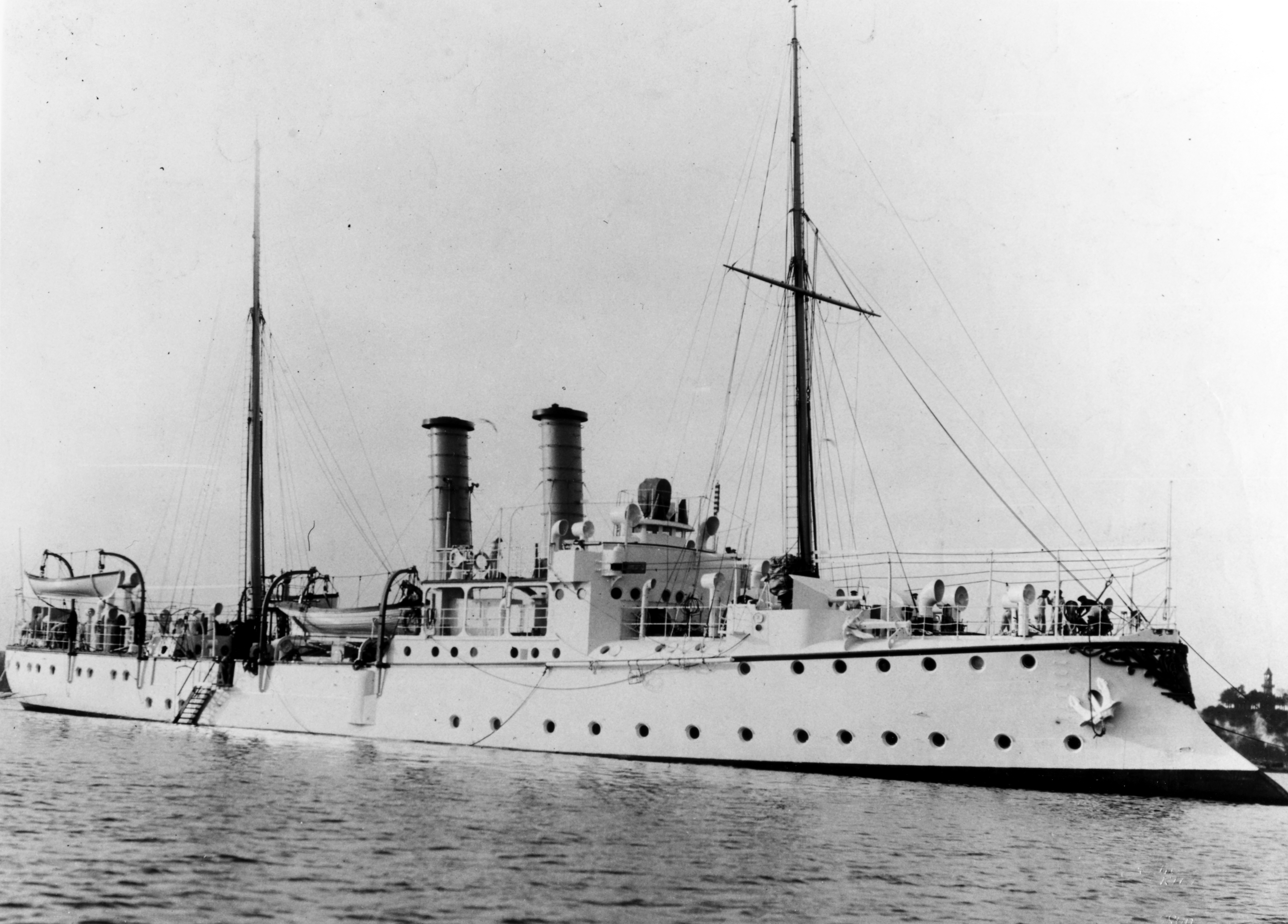
Jaguar soon after completion in 1899

The ships of the Iltis class varied slightly in dimensions. The first four ships were 65.2 meters (213 ft 11 in) long overall and had a beam of 9.1 m (29 ft 10 in), while Panther and Eber were 66.9 m (219 ft 6 in) long overall; their beam increased slightly to 9.7 m (31 ft 10 in). The ships had a draft of 3.54 to 3.59 m (11 ft 7 in to 11 ft 9 in) forward. Iltis and Jaguar displaced 894 metric tons (880 long tons) as designed and 1,048 t (1,031 long tons) at full load. Tiger and Luchs had the same design displacement, but full load increased to 1,108 t (1,091 long tons). The final pair of ships, Panther and Eber, increased design displacement to 977 t (962 long tons) and full load to 1,193 t (1,174 long tons).

Their hulls consisted of transverse steel frames, over which the composite steel and timber hull planking was laid. They were sheathed in Muntz metal to protect them from marine biofouling on extended voyages abroad. The first three ships' hulls were divided into eleven watertight compartments, while the rest of the class only had ten. They all had a double bottom under the propulsion machinery spaces. The first two ships had a raised forecastle deck and a pronounced ram bow, while the latter four exchanged the ram for a straight stem. Their superstructure consisted primarily of a conning tower with an open bridge atop it, along with a smaller deck house further aft. The ships were fitted with a pair of pole masts for signaling purposes. The only armor protection carried by the ships was 8 mm (0.31 in) of steel plate on the conning tower, which was suitable only against rifle bullets and shell fragments.

Steering was controlled via a single rudder, and they maneuvered well under most conditions, apart from shallow waters or at high speed. The ships handled generally well, and were considered good sea boats, but they rolled badly in a beam sea. They also suffered from significant yaw and heel in a quartering sea. Despite their small size, they were generally dry vessels. For Panther and Eber, their deadwood was extended to correct the tendency to lose way.

They had a crew of 9 officers and 121 enlisted men. Each vessel carried a number of smaller boats, including one barge, one launch, one cutter, one yawl, and one dinghy. In addition, Panther and Eber each carried a second cutter, and while the Iltis-class ships operated in Chinese waters, they carried a pair of sampans as well.

=== Machinery ===
Plan and profile of the Iltis class

Iltis's propulsion system consisted of a pair of horizontal triple-expansion steam engines, each driving a single three-bladed screw propeller; the rest of the class received vertical triple-expansion engines. The engines were placed in a single engine room. Steam for the engines was supplied by four coal-fired Thornycroft boilers, with the exception of Eber, which received four navy-type boilers. All ships had their boilers installed in a single boiler room. Exhaust was vented through two funnels located amidships. The first four ships carried a pair of electricity generators that produced 16 kilowatts (21 hp) at 67 Volts, while Panther and Eber had three generators that produced 17.8 kW (23.9 hp) at 67 Volts and 20 kW (27 hp) at 110 Volts, respectively.

The ships were rated to steam at a top speed of 13.5 knots (25.0 km/h; 15.5 mph) at 1,300 metric horsepower (1,300 ihp), though all members of the class exceeded these figures in service. Their coal storage varied significantly, as did their engines' efficiency. Iltis and Jaguar carried a maximum of 190 t (190 long tons) of coal, and had a cruising radius of about 3,080 nautical miles (5,700 km; 3,540 mi) at a speed of 9 knots (17 km/h; 10 mph). At the same speed, Tiger and Luchs were capable of only 2,580 nautical miles (4,780 km; 2,970 mi), from a maximum capacity of 203 t (200 long tons) of coal. Panther and Eber, meanwhile, carried 283 t (279 long tons) of coal and could sail for 3,400 nautical miles (6,300 km; 3,900 mi) at that speed.

=== Armament ===
Iltis and Jaguar were armed with a main battery of four 8.8 cm (3.5 in) SK L/30 guns, with 1,124 rounds of ammunition. These weapons had a maximum range of 7,300 m (8,000 yd). Two guns were placed side-by-side on the forecastle and the other pair side-by-side near the stern. The rest of the class was armed instead with two single 10.5 cm (4.1 in) SK L/40 guns, one mounted in the bow and one astern. These guns, which had become available during the design process for the third member of the class, were supplied with 482 rounds of ammunition in total, and could engage targets out to 12,200 m (13,300 yd). The mounts initially used for the 10.5 cm guns proved to be fragile, as demonstrated by Panther's engagements in 1902 against the Haitian gunboat Crête-à-Pierrot and Venezuelan coastal fortifications, which led to modifications that resulted in an improved mounting.

All six ships also carried six 37 mm (1.5 in) Maxim guns, which were supplied with a total of 9,000 rounds of ammunition.

== Ships ==
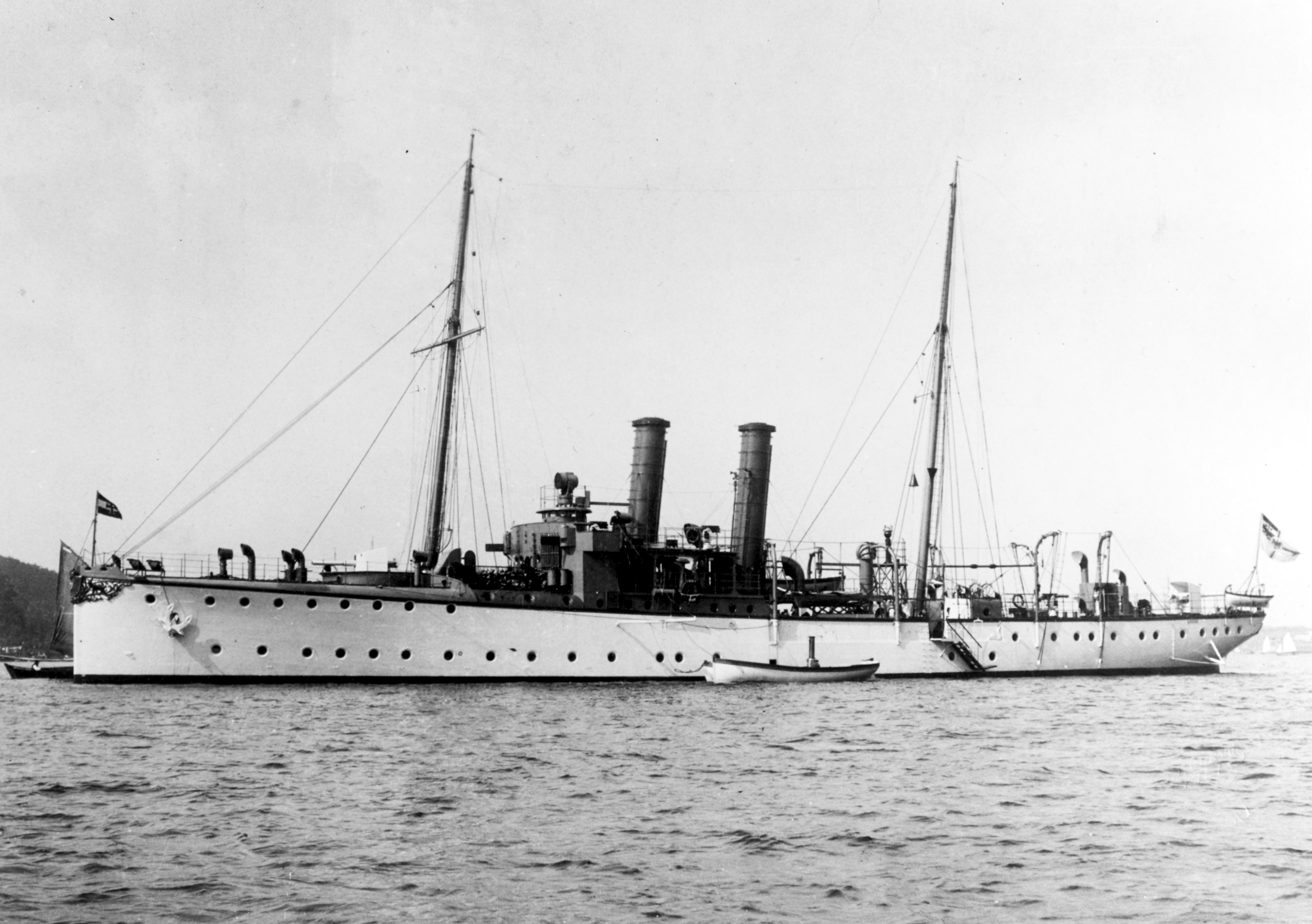
Luchs c. 1900

Construction data
Ship	Builder	Laid down	Launched	Commissioned
Iltis	Schichau-Werke, Danzig	27 November 1897	4 August 1898	1 December 1898
Jaguar	Schichau-Werke, Danzig	September 1897	19 September 1898	4 April 1899
Tiger	Kaiserlich Werft, Kiel	November 1898	15 August 1899	3 April 1900
Luchs	Kaiserlich Werft, Kiel	December 1898	18 October 1899	15 May 1900
Panther	Kaiserlich Werft, Kiel	July 1900	1 April 1901	15 March 1902
Eber	AG Vulcan, Stettin	1902	6 June 1903	15 September 1903

== Service history ==
=== East Asia Squadron ===
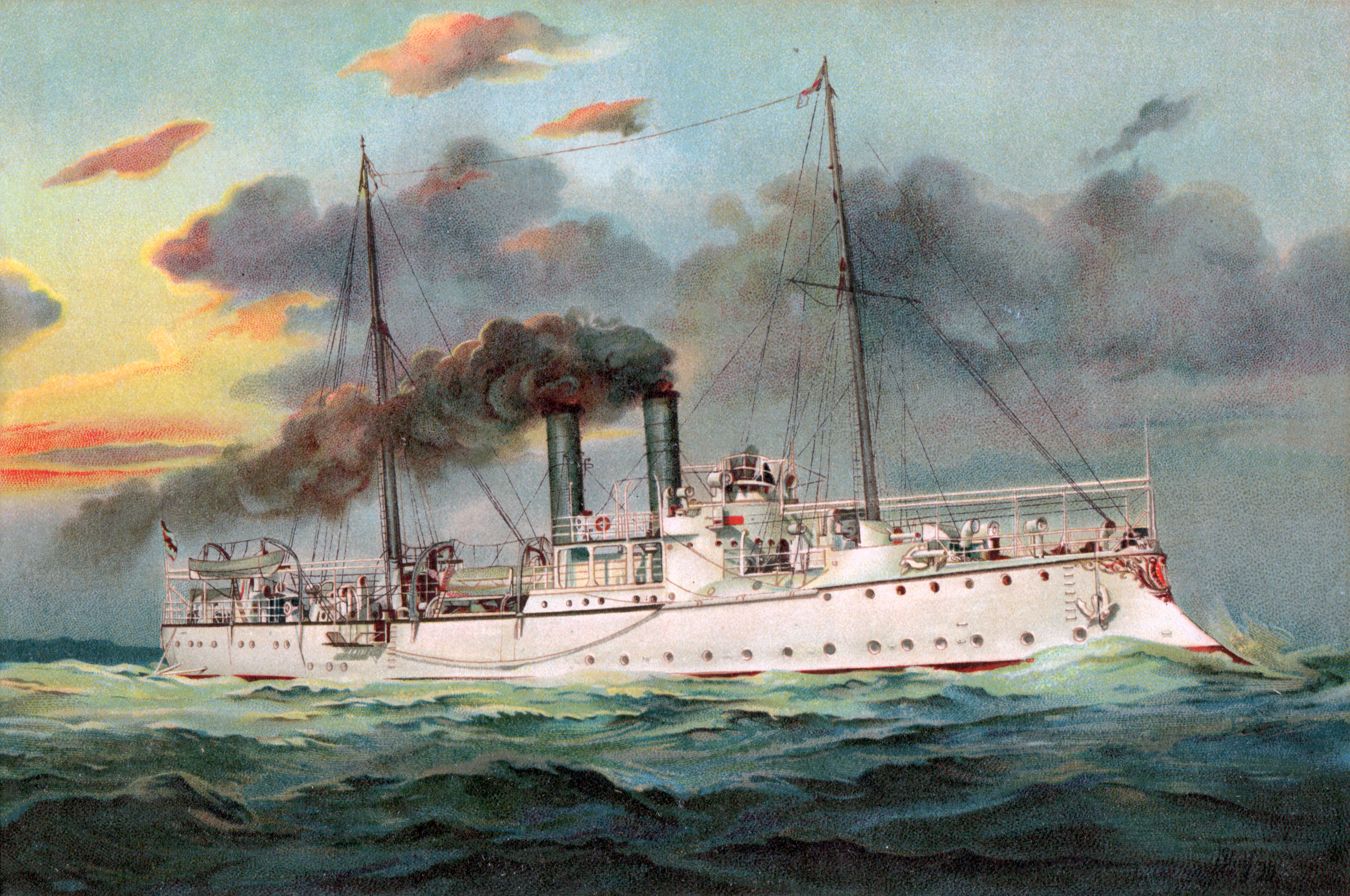
A 1902 lithograph of Jaguar

After entering service in 1899, Iltis was deployed to the East Asia Squadron, based in Qingdao, China, with Jaguar joining her there later that year. Tiger was similarly sent to East Asia in 1900. Luchs was initially intended to serve on the American Station, but she was reassigned to the East Asia Squadron before she entered service in 1900, as a result of the start of the Boxer Uprising in China.

Iltis was heavily involved in the initial operations by the Eight Nation Alliance to suppress the Boxers, and then fight Qing troops supporting them. Iltis contributed men to landing parties to secure Tientsin, and in June 1900, she saw significant fighting at the Battle of the Taku Forts, leading the naval assault on the forts guarding the entrance to the Hai River. During the action, Iltis received numerous hits and suffered relatively heavy casualties, including the first German naval officer killed in action. The ship's captain, Wilhelm von Lans, was seriously wounded during the battle and received the Pour le Merite for his actions. Iltis was similarly decorated. Jaguar, meanwhile, was used to protect Germans in various port cities during the conflict. Tiger did not participate in any fighting during the Boxer Uprising, and instead patrolled the Yellow Sea. After Luchs arrived, some of her men and guns were transferred to Schamien, which was purchased to serve as a river gunboat during the fighting.

In the years after the conflict, the four members of the class patrolled the Far East, normally without incident. During the Russo-Japanese War of 1904–1905, Jaguar cruised in Korean waters to ensure that the fighting there did not affect German interests. Tiger was used to evacuate Germans from Incheon, Korea in the early stages of the war. Jaguar next participated in the suppression of rebellions against German rule in the Caroline Islands and German Samoa in 1908 and 1909, respectively. Iltis saw no further significant action for the remainder of her time in East Asian waters, though her crew remained on alert during the Xinhai Revolution against the Qing government in 1911 and 1912. During the revolution, Jaguar, Tiger, and Luchs patrolled several Chinese ports in order to be available in the event the fighting began to affect Germans in China.

After the start of World War I in July 1914, Iltis was disarmed; some of her weapons and crew were sent to convert a captured Russian merchant vessel into the auxiliary cruiser Cormoran, while the rest were used to strengthen the defenses of Qingdao. Tiger and Luchs were similarly disarmed, with their guns and part of their crew used to equip the steamer Prinz Eitel Friedrich. The remaining crew were used to strengthen the German land defenses. Jaguar was the only vessel of the four Iltis-class ships operating in China that was kept in service after the outbreak of World War I. She saw significant action during the Siege of Qingdao, engaging in artillery duels with Japanese field guns. As the German position in Qingdao worsened, Iltis and Luchs were scuttled on the night of 28–29 September to prevent their capture. Tiger was subsequently scuttled on 29 October. With the German garrison set to surrender on 8 November, Jaguar was scuttled on the night of 6–7 November.

=== Panther and Eber ===
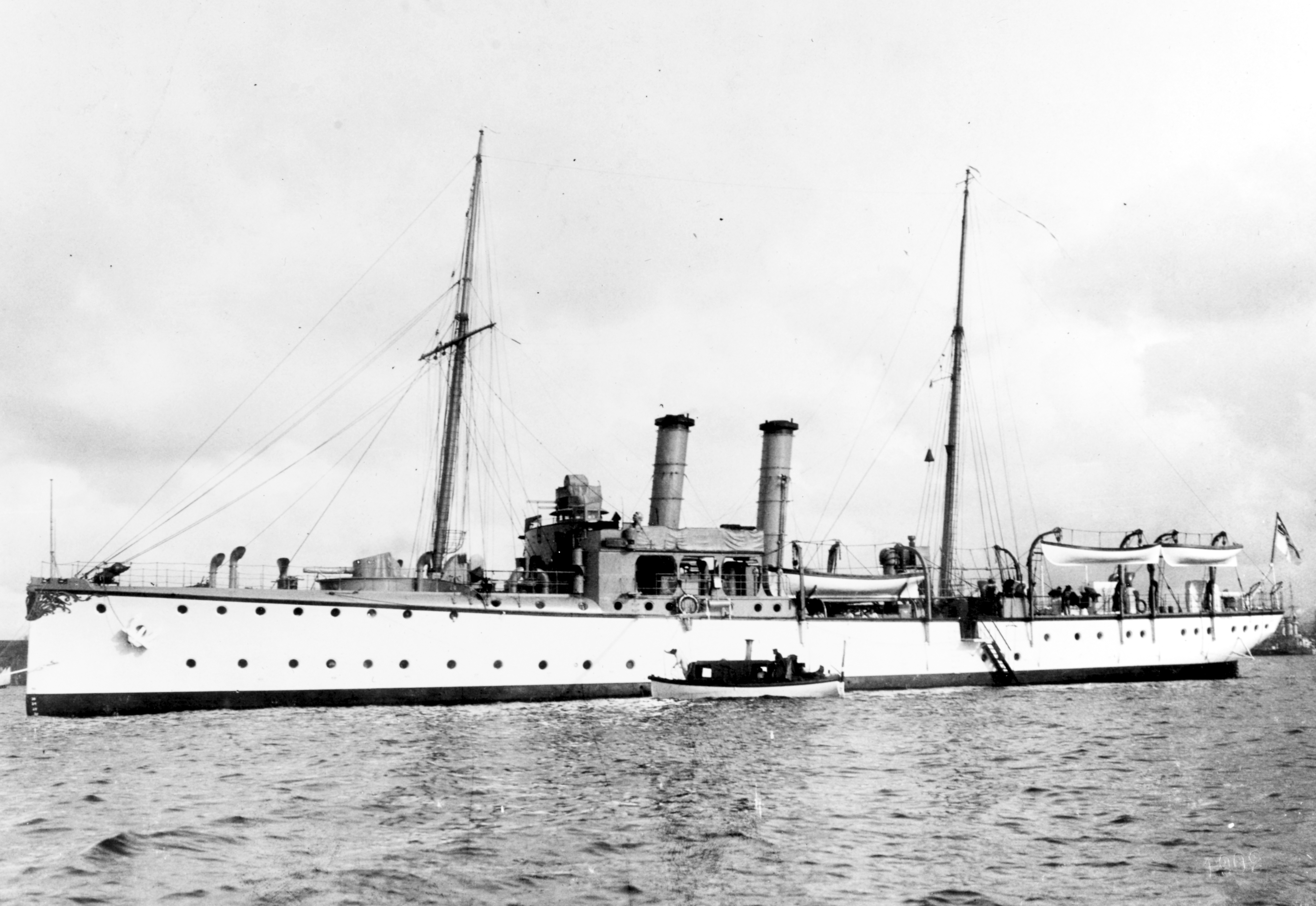
Panther soon after entering service in 1902

Panther spent most of her career abroad, where she was involved in a number of international disputes. She was initially sent to the American Station after entering service in 1902, and was soon sent to Haiti to intervene in the Markomannia incident, where she sank the Haitian gunboat Crête-à-Pierrot. Panther was next involved in the Venezuelan crisis of 1902–1903, during which she participated in the bombardment of Fort San Carlos. She returned to Haiti in 1904 to pressure the Haitian government to pay a settlement after the murder of a German diplomat in the country. In 1905 and 1906, the ship toured South America, steaming as far south as Paraguay. She was transferred to German West Africa in mid-1907.

The ship patrolled Germany's West African colonies for the next four years, largely uneventfully. Recalled to Germany for repairs in 1911, she stopped in Agadir, Morocco, at the request of the Foreign Office, touching off the Agadir Crisis, the most significant incident of Panther's career. The resulting international uproar created a war scare that significantly worsened Anglo-German relations. After repairs in Germany, Panther returned to Africa for another tour from 1912 to 1914, arriving back in Germany weeks before the start of World War I. She was used as a patrol vessel in the western Baltic Sea during the war, but saw no action. After the war, she was retained by the new Reichsmarine (Navy of the Realm) for use as a survey ship. Decommissioned in 1926, she was eventually sold to ship breakers in 1931 and dismantled.

For her part, Eber saw very little activity. Completed in 1903, she spent the next seven years in reserve. She was activated for her first overseas deployment in 1910, to be sent to patrol the colonies in German West Africa alongside Panther. The next four years passed largely uneventfully for Eber, though in 1911, she participated in the Agadir Crisis in Morocco. After the start of World War I in July 1914, Eber left Africa to find a German ocean liner suitable for use as an auxiliary cruiser; she met Cap Trafalgar in late August, and transferred both of her 10.5 cm guns, along with most of her crew, to that vessel. Eber thereafter sailed for then-neutral Brazil, where she remained until the Brazilian government entered the war on the side of the Triple Entente in October 1917. To prevent her capture, the ship's remaining crew scuttled the ship on 26 October.
