= List of shipwrecks in January 1915 =

The list of shipwrecks in January 1915 includes ships sunk, foundered, grounded, or otherwise lost during January 1915.

== 1 January ==
List of shipwrecks: 1 January 1915
Ship	State	Description
HMS Formidable	Royal Navy	A German drawing of HMS Formidable sinking. World War I: The Formidable-class battleship was torpedoed and sunk in the English Channel 20 nautical miles (37 km) off Start Point, Devon by SM U-24 (Imperial German Navy) with the loss of 547 of her 780 crew. Seventy-one of the survivors were rescued by the fishing trawler Provident (United Kingdom).
Jamaica	Norway	The 730 GRT coaster on a trip from Newport for Oporto with a cargo of coal, was driven ashore at Angeiras in severe weather and subsequently wrecked with the loss of all 13 hands.
Mary Agnes	United Kingdom	The 103 GRT schooner on a passage from Wexford for Bristol was driven ashore at Rosslare Strand, County Wexford. Her crew were rescued.
Maryetta	Norway	The 1,457 GRT iron barque on a trip from Aalborg for Santos with a cargo of cement, sprung a leak and started sinking while in the Atlantic Ocean 15 nautical miles (28 km) north west of Fair Isle (59°32′N 2°6′W). The crew abandoned ship, and she sank in the early morning of 2 January with the loss of eleven of her seventeen crew. The survivors were saved by HMS Hilary.
Obidense	Norway	The 2,379 GRT cargo ship on a trip from Rotterdam for New York with general cargo, ran aground on the Shipwash Sands and subsequently foundered. All 44 crew were rescued by the Harwich Lifeboat, a Royal Navy destroyer and a British collier.
Otto	Russia	The 355 GRT three-masted schooner on a trip from Dieppe for Seville with a cargo of flints, ran aground at Weymouth, Dorset United Kingdom and was declared a constructive total loss. She was rebuilt at Whitstable, Kent in 1918 and sold to a Belgian buyer.

== 2 January ==
List of shipwrecks: 2 January 1915
Ship	State	Description
Sunlight	United Kingdom	The steam barge collided with Snowdrop (United Kingdom in the River Mersey at Liverpool, Lancashire and sank. Her crew were rescued by Snowdrop.

== 4 January ==
List of shipwrecks: 4 January 1915
Ship	State	Description
Ashdene	United Kingdom	The 285 GRT coaster departed London for the Tyne with a cargo of nitre cake on 3 January. Last seen next day, no further trace, presumed foundered with the loss of all hands.
HMS C31	Royal Navy	World War I: The C-class submarine struck a mine in the North Sea off the coast of Belgium and sank with the loss of all sixteen crew.
Rambler	United States	The fishing steamer was driven ashore south of Brunswick, Georgia in a heavy gale and broke up. Six crew were killed.

== 5 January ==
List of shipwrecks: 5 January 1915
Ship	State	Description
Astarte	United Kingdom	The 1,201 GRT cargo ship on a trip from Garston for Nantes and Bordeaux with general cargo, collided with Joseph Thompson (United Kingdom) off Liverpool Bar and subsequently sank.

== 6 January ==
List of shipwrecks: 6 January 1915
Ship	State	Description
HMT The Banyers	Royal Navy	World War I: The naval trawler struck a mine placed by the cruiser SMS Kolberg (Imperial German Navy) and sank in the North Sea off Scarborough, Yorkshire with the loss of six of her crew.

== 7 January ==
List of shipwrecks: 7 January 1915
Ship	State	Description
Elfrida	United Kingdom	World War I: The 2,624 GRT cargo ship on a trip from Newcastle for London with a cargo of coal, struck a mine and sank in the North Sea 2 nautical miles (3.7 km) east north east of Scarborough, Yorkshire.
Thames	United Kingdom	World War I: The Admiralty-requisitioned cargo ship was scuttled in Holm Sound, Scapa Flow, as a blockship. The stern and superstructure removed post World War I.

== 8 January ==
For the loss of the British cargo ship Hemisphere on this day, see the entry for 28 December 1914.

List of shipwrecks: 8 January 1915
Ship	State	Description
New Oporto	United Kingdom	The 621 GRT coaster on a trip from Middlesbrough for London with general cargo, ran aground on Haisborough Sands and was subsequently wrecked.
R. R. Thomas	United States	The 1,393 GRT converted barge, former wooden schooner, on a trip from Philadelphia for Quincy with a cargo of coal, foundered off Shinnecock Lighthouse.

== 12 January ==
List of shipwrecks: 12 January 1915
Ship	State	Description
Ethel V. Boynton	United States	The 740 GRT barque on a trip from Mobile for Genoa with a cargo of lumber, ran into a strong gale, developed a leak and was abandoned in sinking condition in the Atlantic Ocean off the coast of New York. The crew was drifting in a lifeboat for six days before being saved by Manzanillo (United States).
Natalia	Spain	The 2,078 GRT cargo ship on a trip from Liverpool for Vigo with general cargo, ran aground at the entrance to Camariñas, off Cabo Vilán, and was wrecked.
Nile	United Kingdom	The 4,188 GRT passenger ship on a trip from London for Yokohama, struck the Howaro Rock and consequently foundered in the Inland Sea of Japan. All on board were rescued by Fukuku Maru (Japan).
Suldal	Norway	The 442 GRT coaster departed Halmstad for London with a cargo of timber. Dissappered without a trace, and never heard from again. An empty lifeboat washed ashore on 19 January near Yarmouth. The ship most likely foundered in a heavy storm in the North Sea.

== 13 January ==
List of shipwrecks: 13 January 1915
Ship	State	Description
Amalia Scotto	Italy	The cargo ship was driven against the quayside in a gale at Naples, Italy, and sank.
Chignecto	United Kingdom	The passenger ship was wrecked on the Trinity Ledge, in the Bay of Fundy. All on board survived.
Cobequid	United Kingdom	The passenger ship was wrecked on the Trinity Ledge, in the Bay of Fundy. All on board survived.
Nomad	United States	The steamer sank at Stonington, Connecticut after colliding with Puritan (flag unknown).
HMS Roedean	Royal Navy	The 1,183 GRT auxiliary minesweeper, a converted rail car ferry, was driven onto HMS Imperieuse (Royal Navy) and sank off Hoy, Orkney Islands, or was sunk by a mine at the entrance to Hoxa Sound. The wreck was cleared 1953–1956.
Ruth	United States	The schooner went ashore on White Beach, Waterford, Connecticut. Abandoned after cargo was salvaged.
HMS Viknor	Royal Navy	World War I: The auxiliary cruiser struck a mine in the Atlantic Ocean off Tory Island, County Donegal and sank with the loss of all 295 crew.
SM U-31	Imperial German Navy	World War I: The Type U 31 submarine struck a mine and sank in the North Sea off the east coast of the United Kingdom with the loss of all 31 crew.

== 14 January ==
List of shipwrecks: 14 January 1915
Ship	State	Description
Fulwell	United Kingdom	World War I: The 3,824 GRT cargo ship on a trip from Calcutta for Hull with a cargo of linseed and sugar, collided with Massilia (United Kingdom) in the Atlantic Ocean 80 nautical miles (150 km) north of Lisbon, and subsequently sank. Her crew was saved by Massilia.
Highland Brae	United Kingdom	World War I: The 7,634 GRT cargo liner on a trip from London for Buenos Aires with passengers, mail and cargo of coal, was captured in the Atlantic Ocean 630 nautical miles (1,170 km) north east by east of Pernambuco, Brazil by SMS Kronprinz Wilhelm (Imperial German Navy). Her passengers and crew were taken as prisoners of war. The vessel was scuttled on 30 January.
Maria O. Teel	United States	The 1,126 GRT schooner on a trip from Philadelphia for Ponce with a cargo of coal, foundered in Atlantic Ocean (31°57′N 12°28′W). Her crew of 10 was saved.
Sao Paulo	Imperial German Navy	World War I: The minesweeper struck a mine in the North Sea west of Amrum Bank and sank.
Wilfrid M.	United Kingdom	World War I: The 251 GRT schooner on a trip from Halifax for Bahia with a cargo of dried fish, was captured and scuttled in the Atlantic Ocean 625 nautical miles (1,158 km) north east by east of Pernambuco by SMS Kronprinz Wilhelm (Imperial German Navy). Her crew were taken as prisoners of war.

== 15 January ==
List of shipwrecks: 15 January 1915
Ship	State	Description
Saphir	French Navy	World War I: Gallipoli campaign: The Émeraude-class submarine was sunk in the Dardanelles with the loss of fourteen of her 27 crew.
Skotfos	Norway	The 1,260 GRT cargo ship on a trip from Trondheim for Manchester with a cargo of lumber, paper and carbide, ran aground on North Ronaldsay, Orkney Islands and was subsequently wrecked.

== 16 January ==
List of shipwrecks: 16 January 1915
Ship	State	Description
HM Tug Char	Royal Navy	The naval tug collided with Erivan (Belgium) in the English Channel off Deal, Kent and sank with the loss of all fourteen crew.
Motor	United Kingdom	The 312 GRT coaster on a trip from Port Mulgrave for Jarrow with a cargo of ironstone, foundered in the North Sea off the mouth of the River Tees with the loss of all hands.

== 17 January ==
List of shipwrecks: 17 January 1915
Ship	State	Description
Åhus	Russia	World War I: The 341 GRT coaster on a trip from Mäntyluoto for Raumo with general cargo, struck a mine off Raumo in the Baltic, and sank with the loss of all 11 people on board. The explosion was witnessed from a distance by two other ships, but for fear of the minefield they could not come to the rescue.
Georgios	Greece	World War I: The 795 GRT coaster, chartered by the governemnt of Turkey, on a voyage from Istanbul for Trabzon with a cargo of army equipment, was torpedoed and sunk off Sinope, Turkey by Leytenant Zatsarenny, Kapitan Saken and Leytenant Shestakov (all Imperial Russian Navy).
Monitor	Russia	World War I: The 136 GRT schooner on a passage from Wick for Blyth in ballast, ran aground at the mouth of the Tyne and was wrecked.
Penarth	United Kingdom	The 3,035 GRT cargo ship on a trip from San Nicolás for Hull with a cargo of maize, foundered in the North Sea off Sheringham with the loss of 22 of her 27 crew. Survivors were rescued by HMS Glenprosen (Royal Navy).

== 18 January ==
List of shipwrecks: 18 January 1915
Ship	State	Description
Delhi	United States	During a voyage from Craig to Wrangell, Territory of Alaska, with a crew of 27 and cargo of 7.5 tons of merchandise and empty oil drums aboard, the 986-gross register ton steamer was wrecked without loss of life on Straits Island Reef (56°24′30″N 133°48′30″W) in Southeast Alaska. During a storm on 5 February, she floated off the reef and several days later the motor vessel Takue (United States) discovered her and towed her to the north coast of Sumner Island (56.4061°N 133.8025°W), where she was beached. Her hull damage was so severe that she was deemed a total loss.
George Royle	United Kingdom	The 2,525 GRT cargo ship on a trip from Tyne for St. Nazaire with a cargo of coal, foundered in the North Sea 1 nautical mile (1.9 km) northwest of Sheringham Shoal, Sheringham, with the loss of thirteen of her eighteen crew. Survivors were rescued by HMS Glenprosen (Royal Navy).
HMS E10	Royal Navy	World War I: The E-class submarine sank in the North Sea.

== 20 January ==
List of shipwrecks: 20 January 1915
Ship	State	Description
Eidsvaag	Norway	The 527 GRT coaster caught fire while anchored at Burntisland with a cargo of coal. She was refloated in April 1915, sold for repairs and returned to service as Kathleen Lily.
George N. Reed	United States	The 493 GRT schooner on a trip from New York for Tampa with a cargo of cement, ran into stormy weather, lost her rudder and subsequently ran aground on Pea Island and was wrecked.
Luella Nickerson	United States	The schooner sank near the breakwater at Point Judith, Rhode Island. Later refloated.

== 21 January ==
List of shipwrecks: 21 January 1915
Ship	State	Description
Borrowdale	United Kingdom	The 1,093 GRT cargo ship departed from Cardiff for Granville with a cargo of coal. Dissappeared without a trace and never heard from again, most likely foundered in a gale on 22 January.
Drott	Sweden	World War I: The 1,286 GRT cargo ship, en route from Stockholm to Raumo with general cargo, struck a mine in the Baltic Sea off Raumo, and subsequenty sank with the loss of five men, including the master.
Durward	United Kingdom	World War I: The 1,301 GRT cargo ship on a trip from Leith for Rotterdam with general cargo, was scuttled in the North Sea 22 nautical miles (41 km) north west of the Maas Lightship (Netherlands) by SM U-19 (Imperial German Navy). All 22 crew survived.
Hizir Reis	Ottoman Navy	World War I: The Isa Reis-class gunboat was sunk by mines in the Bosporus. Salvaged, repaired and returned to service.
SM U-7	Imperial German Navy	World War I: The Type U5 submarine was torpedoed and sunk in the North Sea off the coast of the Netherlands (53°43′N 6°02′E) by SM U-22 (Imperial German Navy) (friendly fire accident) with the loss of 24 of her 25 crew.
Vauxhall	United Kingdom	The 764 GRT collier on a trip from Seaham Harbour for Thames with a cargo of coal, struck a submerged wreck and sank in the North Sea off Sheringham, Norfolk. All thirteen crew were rescued by a Royal Navy patrol vessel.
Yeo	United Kingdom	The ketch departed Lydney, Gloucestershire for Barnstaple, Devon. No further trace, presumed foundered with the loss of all hands.

== 22 January ==
List of shipwrecks: 22 January 1915
Ship	State	Description
Balmoral	United Kingdom	The 172 GRT fishing trawler departed Grimsby on 20 January. Last seen fishing on 22 January, never heard from again.
Golden Oriole	United Kingdom	World War I: The 50 GRT trawler struck a mine and sank in the North Sea 37 nautical miles (69 km) east by north of Lowestoft, Suffolk
Hetty	United Kingdom	The schooner was driven ashore at Goodwick, Pembrokeshire. Her crew were rescued. She was refloated on 28 January.
Hørda	Norway	The 612 GRT coaster on a voyage from Odda for Lisbon with a cargo of carbide, ran aground at Shawbost, on the west side of the Isle of Lewis, Outer Hebrides and was wrecked with the loss of all 14 hands.
Hydro	United Kingdom	The 1,288 GRT cargo ship on a voyage from Liverpool for Trondheim with general cargo, foundered in the Atlantic Ocean 15 nautical miles (28 km) off Giant's Causeway with the loss of fourteen of her twenty crew. Four of the survivors were rescued by Mynegen (United Kingdom). The others reached land in a lifeboat.
Windsor	United Kingdom	World War I: The 172 GRT trawler struck a mine and sank in the North Sea 55 nautical miles (102 km) east of Spurn Point, Yorkshire. Her crew were rescued by the trawler Bernicia (United Kingdom).

== 23 January ==
List of shipwrecks: 23 January 1915
Ship	State	Description
Astrée	France	The 4,612 GRT cargo ship on a passage from Rouen for Barry in ballast ran aground at Omonville and was wrecked.
Empress	United Kingdom	The 2,025 GRT cargo ship on a passage from London for Sunderland in ballast, struck a wreck on Sheringham Shoal, and subsequently foundered.
Nordkyn	Norway	The 268 GRT coaster on a trip from Bergen for Königsberg with a cargo of herring, passed Hammershus signal station and dissappeared without a trace. Most likely the ship wandered into a minefield east of Christiansø and sank with the loss of all 11 men.
Nubia	United Kingdom	The 1,173 GRT cargo ship on a trip from Tyne for Cherbourg with a cargo of coal, collided in a dense fog with Abbas (United Kingdom) off Yarmouth and subsequently foundered. Her crew was saved by Abbas.

== 24 January ==
List of shipwrecks: 24 January 1915
Ship	State	Description
SMS Blücher	Imperial German Navy	SMS Blücher. World War I: Battle of the Dogger Bank: The armoured cruiser was shelled and sunk in the North Sea by HMS Indomitable, HMS Lion, New Zealand, HMS Princess Royal and HMS Tiger (all Royal Navy) with the loss of at least 747 of her 1,200-plus crew.
Earlshall	United Kingdom	The 422 GRT motor barque, on a passage from Pernambuco for St. John's in ballast, ran aground in a snowstorm off Bay Bulls and was wrecked.
Loch Torridon	Russia	The 1,999 GRT barque on a voyage from Fredrikstad for Geelong with a cargo of wood, was abandoned dismasted in the Atlantic Ocean (51°35′N 12°28′W). Her crew were rescued by Orduna (United Kingdom). The ship subsequently foundered.

== 25 January ==
List of shipwrecks: 25 January 1915
Ship	State	Description
SMS Gazelle	Imperial German Navy	World War I: The Gazelle-class cruiser struck a mine and was damaged in the Baltic Sea off Cape Arkona, Rügen, Pomerania. She was not repaired and served as a hulk for the remainder of the war.

== 26 January ==
List of shipwrecks: 26 January 1915
Ship	State	Description
HMS Britannia	Royal Navy	The King Edward VII-class battleship ran aground at Inchkeith in the Firth of Forth. She suffered considerable bottom damage, but was refloated after 36 hours and repaired.
Elizabeth Palmer	United States	The 3,065 GRT schooner on a passage from Portland for Norfolk in ballast, collided with Washingtonian (United States) and became waterlogged in the Atlantic Ocean off Fenwick Island, Delaware. She was taken under tow by USCGC Mohawk but capsized and sank on 29 January off the Delaware Breakwater. The wreck was blown up in February 1915. Her crew were rescued by Washingtonian, which subsequently foundered. All 52 people then aboard Washingtonian were rescued by Hamilton (United States).
Isabel Browne	Russian Empire	The 1,315 GRT iron barque on a trip from Taltal for English Channel with a cargo of nitrates, was intercepted and captured by the German auxiliary cruiser Prinz Eitel Friedrich. Three of her crew joined the raider, and the remaining thirteen were taken prisoners. The ship was scuttled the next day in approximate position 30°30′S 24°45′W.
Washingtonian	United States	The 6,650 GRT cargo ship on a voyage from Hilo for Delaware Breakwater with a cargo of sugar, sank in the Atlantic Ocean off Fenwick Island, Delaware, after colliding with the schooner Elizabeth Palmer (United States) in a storm. One crewman was killed, 52 people aboard Washingtonian – her crew and the rescued crew of Elizabeth Palmer, were saved by Hamilton (United States).
Zeitieh	United Kingdom	The 291 GRT coaster on a trip from Zeitieh for Gemsah with piping and railway material, caught fire while undergoing maintenance near Rassin Island (27°42′0″N 33°41′6″E). She soon developed a list either due to accumulation of water or her machinery shift, capsized and sank.

== 27 January ==
List of shipwrecks: 27 January 1915
Ship	State	Description
Pierre Loti	France	The 2,196 GRT barque on a trip from San Francisco for Queenstown with a cargo of wheat, was intercepted and captured in the Atlantic Ocean by the auxiliary cruiser Prinz Eitel Friedrich (Imperial German Navy). The ship was subsequently scuttled in approximate position 29°33′S 26°47′W, and her crew was taken prisoners.
Guvernøren	Norway	The 5,459 GRT whale factory ship caught fire while anchored at Oddhavn, South Shetland Islands with a cargo of whale oil. The ship was driven ashore to avoid sinking, her crew survived.
Velingheli	United Kingdom	The schooner collided with Laertes (United Kingdom) at Liverpool, Lancashire and sank. Her four crew were rescued.
William P. Frye	United States	World War I: The 3,374 GRT barque on a voyage from Portland for Plymouth with a cargo of wheat, was intercepted and captured in the Atlantic Ocean by the auxiliary cruiser Prinz Eitel Friedrich (Imperial German Navy) in approximate position 29°34′5″S 24°25′0″W. She was scuttled the next day. Her crew were taken on board Prinz Eitel Friedrich and released when she arrived at Newport News, Virginia, United States on 11 March.

== 29 January ==
List of shipwrecks: 29 January 1915
Ship	State	Description
Watuppa	United States	The tug struck a rock and sank in the Cape Cod Canal near Bournedale, Massachusetts.

== 30 January ==
List of shipwrecks: 30 January 1915
Ship	State	Description
Ben Cruachan	United Kingdom	World War I: The 3,092 GRT collier on a passage from Scapa Flow for Liverpool with a cargo of coal, was scuttled in the Irish Sea 15 nautical miles (28 km) northwest of the Morecambe lightship (53°36′N 3°51′W) by SM U-21 (Imperial German Navy). All crew survived, rescued by trawler Margaret (United Kingdom).
Ikaria	United Kingdom	World War I: The 4,335 GRT cargo ship on a voyage from Buenos Aires for Le Havre with general cargo, was sunk in the English Channel 25 nautical miles (46 km; 29 mi) north west of Le Havre by SM U-20 (Imperial German Navy). Her crew survived.
Kilcoan	United Kingdom	World War I: The 456 GRT coaster on a trip from Garston for Belfast with a cargo of coal, was sunk in the Irish Sea (53°54′N 3°46′W) by SM U-21 (Imperial German Navy). Her crew survived.
Linda Blanche	United Kingdom	Linda Blanche (by Willy Stöwer) World War I: The 369 GRT coaster on a trip from Manchester for Belfast with general cargo, was captured and sunk with explosives in the Irish Sea 18 nautical miles (33 km) northwest of the Bar Lightship (53°34′N 3°51′W) by SM U-21 (Imperial German Navy). Her crew was rescued by trawler Niblick (United Kingdom).
Nevsehir	Ottoman Navy	World War I: The Taskopru-class gunboat was mined in the Bosporus.
Oriole	United Kingdom	World War I: The 1,489 GRT cargo ship on a trip from London for Le Havre with general cargo, was torpedoed and sunk in the English Channel 20 nautical miles (37 km) north west of Cap d'Antifer, Seine Maritime by SM U-20 (Imperial German Navy) with the loss of all 21 crew.
Perth	United Kingdom	The cargo ship sprang a leak in the North Sea and was beached on the Hert Sands off Tynemouth, Northumberland.
Tokomaru	United Kingdom	World War I: The 6,084 GRT cargo ship on a voyage from New Zealand for Le Havre and London with general cargo and foodstuffs, was torpedoed and sunk in the English Channel 7 nautical miles (13 km) northwest of the Le Havre Lightship (France) by SM U-20 (Imperial German Navy). All 58 crew were rescued by the trawler Semper (France) and six French Navy torpedo boats.

== 31 January ==
List of shipwrecks: 31 January 1915
Ship	State	Description
Asama	Imperial Japanese Navy	The Asama-class armored cruiser ran aground on an uncharted rock at the entrance to the bay at Puerto San Bartolomé, Baja California, Mexico. She was refloated on 8 May, emergency repairs begin on 21 June at San Diego, California. The ship arrived on 18 December at Yokosuka, and returned to service in March 1917.
