= Otto Hersing =

German naval officer (1885–1960)

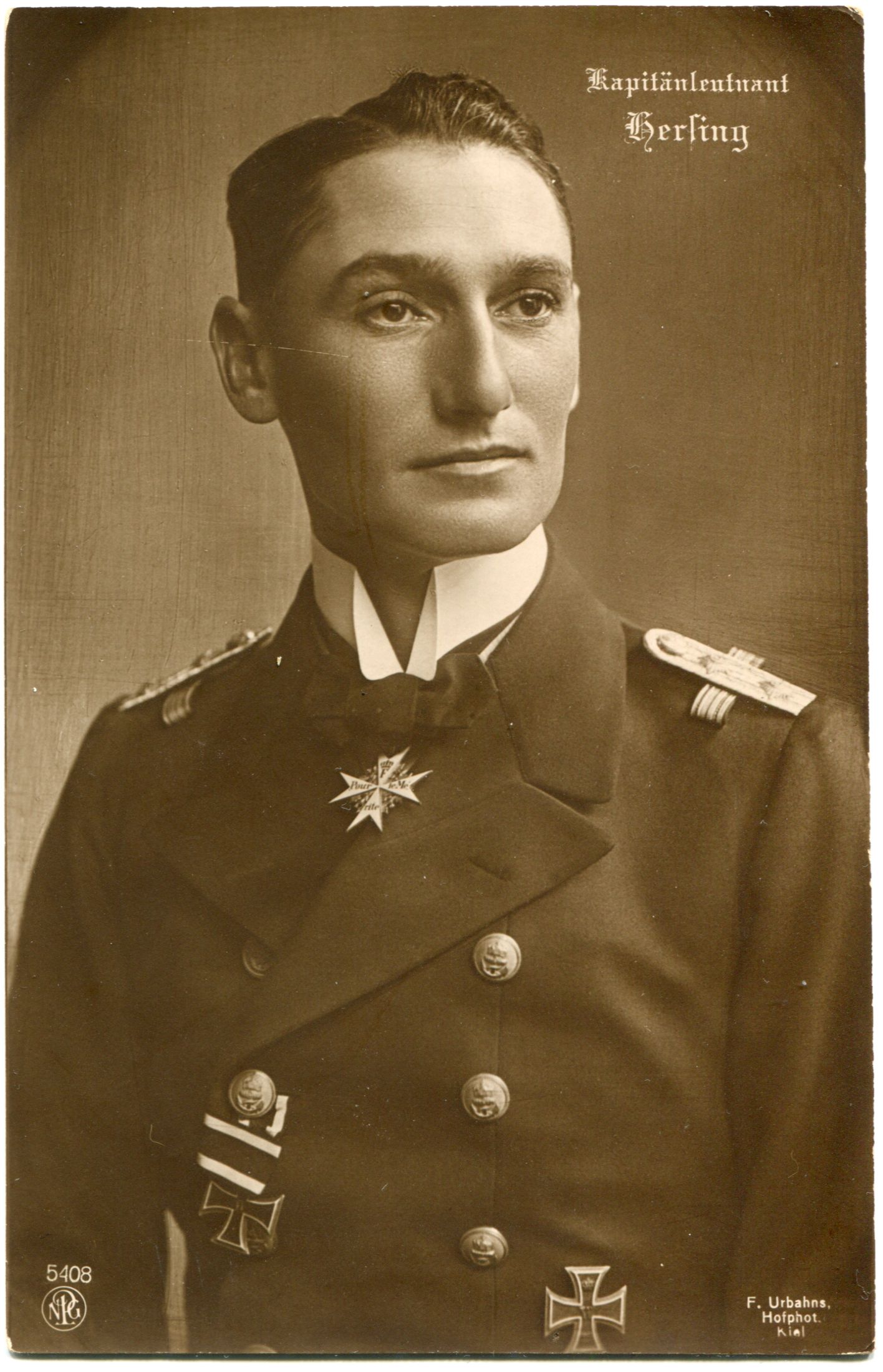
- Born: 30 November 1885; Mülhausen, Alsace, German Empire
- Died: 5 July 1960 (aged 74); Angelmodde near Münster, Germany
- Burial place: Angelmodde
- Military career
- Allegiance: German Empire Austria-Hungary Weimar Republic
- Branch: Imperial German Navy Austro-Hungarian Navy Reichsmarine
- Service years: 1903–1918, 1919–24
- Rank: Korvettenkapitän
- Nicknames: Zerstörer von Schlachtschiffen (Destroyer of battleships); Retter der Dardanellen (Saviour of the Dardanelles)
- Commands: U-21
- Conflicts: World War I: Naval operations in the Dardanelles Campaign; Mediterranean U-boat Campaign
- Awards: Pour le Mérite Iron Cross 1st and 2nd Class Albert Order (Saxony) Iron Crescent (Ottoman Empire)

Otto Hersing (30 November 1885 – 1 July 1960) was a German naval officer who served as U-boat commander in the Kaiserliche Marine and the k.u.k. Kriegsmarine during World War I.

In September 1914, while in command of the German U-21 submarine, he became famous for the first sinking of an enemy ship by a self-propelled locomotive torpedo.

== Career ==
=== Early life and training ===
Hersing joined the Imperial German Navy in 1903. He received his first training on the school ship Stosch, on the corvette Blücher and on the artillery training ship Mars. He served as a Fähnrich on the battleship Kaiser Wilhelm II. In September 1906 he was promoted to Leutnant and transferred on the light cruiser Hamburg. On 1909, he was promoted to Oberleutnant. From 1911 to 1913, Hersing served as watch officer on the protected cruiser Hertha, and he had the chance to sail around the Mediterranean Sea and the West Indies.

=== World War I and North Sea operations ===
In 1914, Hersing was promoted to Kapitänleutnant and received special training for the submarine warfare. When World War I broke out, he was given command of U-21, at the time located at the island of Heligoland in the North Sea. Between August and September, U-21 carried out reconnaissance in the North Sea, but he was not able to find any enemy ships. Hersing then tried to force his way into the Firth of Forth, at that time a British naval base, but with no success.

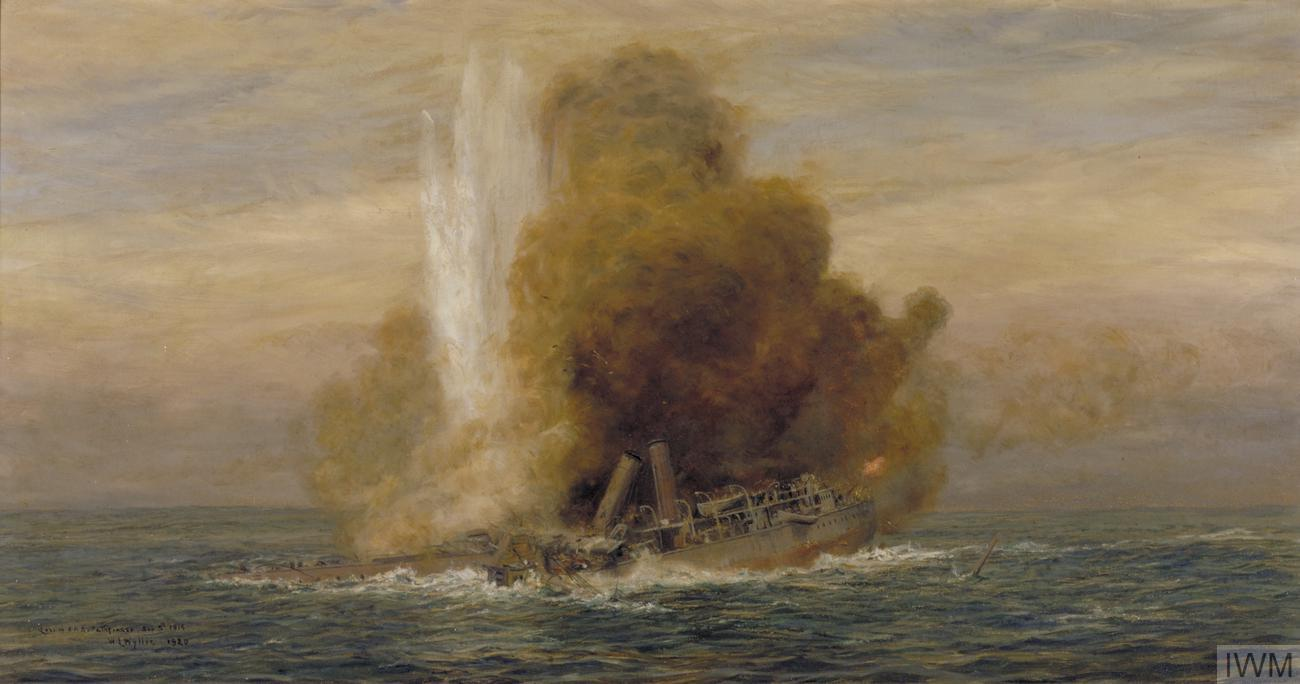
Painting of the sinking of HMS Pathfinder

On September 5, Hersing spotted the light cruiser Pathfinder off the Scottish coast, sailing at a reduced speed of 5 knots due to a shortage of coal. Hersing decided to attack the ship and hit her with a single torpedo just below the bridge, close to the ship's powder magazine, which was destroyed by a great explosion. The ship sank in a short time, and 261 sailors were killed. It was the first sinking of a modern warship by a submarine armed with torpedoes.

On 14 November, U-21 intercepted the French steamer Malachite. Hersing ordered the crew to abandon the ship before he sank the vessel with his deck gun. Three days later, the British collier Primo suffered the same fate. These two ships were the first vessels to be sunk in the restricted German submarine offensive against British and French merchant shipping.

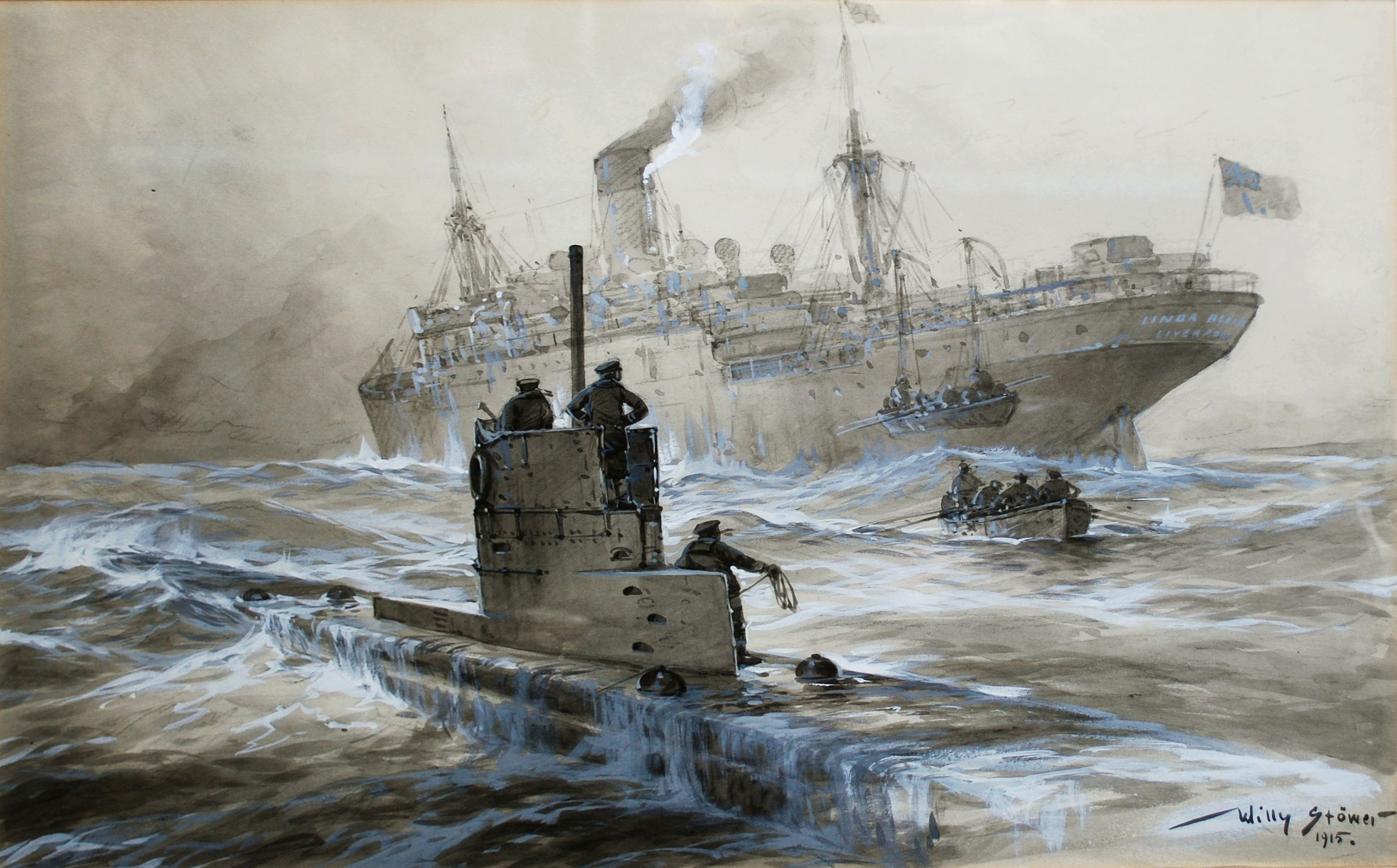
Willy Stöwer's painting of U-21 sinking Linda Blanche

At the beginning of 1915, Hersing received the Iron Cross, 2nd Class, and was ordered to extend German submarine warfare to the western coast of the British Isles. On 21 January, he sailed from Wilhelmshaven and entered the Irish Sea, where he tried to shell the airfield on Walney Island, but had no success. On 30 January U-21 met and sank three merchant ships, Ben Cruachan, Linda Blanche and Kilcuan. In every case, Hersing respected the prize rules, helping the crew of the intercepted ships. He then sailed back to Germany and at the beginning of February docked in Wilhelmshaven, having passed through the Dover Barrage without consequences for the second time in a short while.

=== Operations in the Mediterranean and the Dardanelles ===
Hersing was ordered in April to transfer to the Mediterranean Sea to support the Ottoman Empire, allied to Germany and under attack of British and French troops at the Dardanelles. He sailed with U-21 from Kiel on 25 April and arrived at the Austro-Hungarian port of Cattaro after eighteen days. Due to a problem in refueling, Hersing was forced to slow down his submarine and proceed part of the way on the surface, exposing it to the risk of being detected by Allied units.

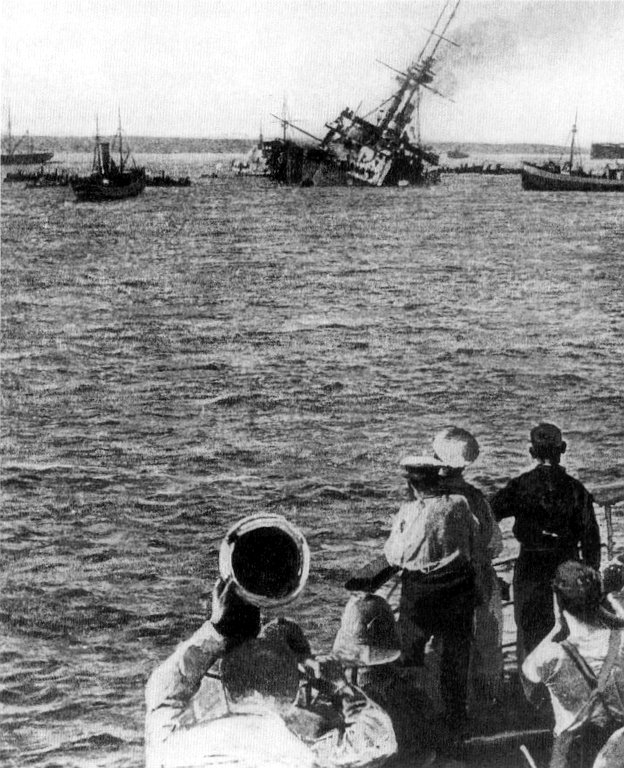
HMS Majestic torpedoed by U-21

After a week in the friendly port, Hersing sailed to his new operational area off Gallipoli, which he reached on 25 May. The same day, he spotted the British battleship HMS Triumph. Hersing brought his U-boat to within 300 yards (270 m) of his target and fired a single torpedo, which hit the battleship and caused it to capsize and sink, causing the death of 3 officers and 75 members of the crew. After the action, Kapitänleutnant Hersing took his submarine to the seafloor and waited there for 28 hours before resurfacing to recharge the electric batteries.

On 27 May, U-21 sank her second Allied battleship in the Dardanelles, the Majestic. Hersing was able to avoid the escorting vessels and the torpedo nets that surrounded the ship, and the Majestic sunk within four minutes of being hit off Cape Helles, causing the death of at least 40 members of the crew (many of them were trapped in the defensive nets that were supposed to protect the ship)

Hersing's successes forced the Allies to withdraw all major ships from Cape Helles, and Great Britain offered a 100,000 pound reward for the capture of the German commander. On 5 June Hersing received the Pour le Mérite, the highest German military honor, as a recognition of his success in the Mediterranean. In the same year, 1915, he was awarded honorary citizenship of the German town of Bad Kreuznach, and he began to be nicknamed Zerstörer von Schlachtschiffen (destroyer of battleships).

The U-21 crew spent a month in Constantinople, due to needed repairs to their submarine. In the Ottoman capital, they received a great welcome and were treated as heroes. Once the repair work was finished, U-21 sortied through the Dardanelles for another patrol. Hersing found the Allied munitions ship Carthage and sank her with a single torpedo on 4 July. Right after that, the submarine was forced to return to Constantinople after bumping an anti-submarine mine that did not cause serious damage. The boat then served briefly in the Black Sea, but with no results. It then returned to the Mediterranean, where in September Hersing found out that the Allies had established a complete blockade of the Dardanelles, using mines and nets in order to prevent enemy submarines to operate in that area.

Hersing therefore returned to Cattaro and received orders to help the Austro-Hungarian Navy in her fight against the Italian Regia Marina. U-21 and her crew were commissioned into the k.u.k. Kriegsmarine and the boat received the designation U-36. This was necessary to allow the submarine to operate against the Italian merchant fleet, since Germany was not yet legally at war with the Kingdom of Italy. The boat served under this name until Italy declared war on Germany on 27 August 1916. In February 1916, Hersing sank the British steamer Belle of France, then the French armored cruiser Amiral Charner, intercepted off the Syrian coast, which caused the death of 427 crew members. Between April and October 1916, U-36 sank numerous merchant ships, including the British steamer City of Lucknow (3,677 tons, sunk near Malta on April 30), three small Italian ships (intercepted near Corsica between October 26 and 28) and the steamboat SS Glenlogan (5,800 tons, October 31). In the first three days of November, Hersing's boat, positioned north of Sicily, sank four more Italian ships, for a total of almost 2,500 tons overall. On 23 December, the German submarine met near Crete the British steamer Benalder and hit her with a torpedo, but she managed to escape and reach Alexandria. In 1916, U-36 sank a total of 12 ships for more than 24,000 tons overall.

=== Return to the North Sea ===
At the beginning of 1917, Hersing left the Mediterranean to support the unrestricted submarine warfare campaign of the German Seekriegsleitung. Between 16 and 17 February, Hersing intercepted and sank two British merchant ships and two small Portuguese ones off the Portuguese coast. Four days later, it was the turn of the French freighter Cacique (2,917 tons), sunk in the Bay of Biscay.

On February 22, U-21 arrived in the Celtic Sea and finished off the Dutch steamer Bandoeng, already damaged by another German submarine. The same day Hersing sank six more Allied ships, five of them Dutch (the largest of which being Noorderdijk, over 7,000 tons) and one Norwegian (Normanna, 2,900 tons). A seventh ship, Menado suffered severe damage, but avoided sinking. In just one day, Hersing sank a total of seven ships, totalling more than 33,000 tons.

Hersing then sailed into North Sea between Scotland and Norway. On April 22, he sunk the steamers Giskö and Theodore William. On April 29 and 30, he sank the Norwegian Askepot and the Russian bark Borrowdale. In the same area, the British steamer Adansi and Killarney suffered the same fate on May 6 and 8, respectively. On June 27, Hersing sank the Swedish auxiliary barge Baltic, carrying a cargo of timber.

Hersing's service in command of U-21 ended in September 1918 when, two months before the Armistice of 11 November 1918, he was assigned to the submarine navigation school at Eckernförde as an instructor.

During the war. Hersing was responsible for the sinking of 40 ships (36 merchantmen and four warships), for a total of more than 113,000 tons; this made him one of the most successful submarine commanders of the Kaiserliche Marine.

=== After the war ===
After the armistice, Hersing was given responsibility for the withdrawal of German troops from the city of Riga (in present Latvia).

It is suspected that he subsequently was involved in the February 1919 sinking of U-21. His former boat was surrendered to the Allies after the end of the war and sank under mysterious circumstances on 22 February 1919, during the transfer to Great Britain, where it should have formally surrendered.

In 1920, he was probably involved in the Kapp Putsch, an attempted coup against the newly formed Weimar Republic, but this had no consequences and he remained in the navy.

In 1922, he was promoted to Korvettenkapitän (corvette captain), the highest rank that he attained in his career. His fame was still so great after the war that the French authorities offered a reward of 20,000 Marks for his capture in the occupied Rhineland.

Hersing ended his military service in 1924 for health reasons and moved with his wife to Rastede, a small town in Lower Saxony, where he became a potato farmer. In 1932, he published his memoir, U-21 rettet die Dardanellen ("U-21 saves the Dardanelles"). In 1935, he and his wife moved to Gremmendorf, a district of the city of Münster.

Hersing died in 1960 after a long illness; his grave is in the Angelmodde cemetery. The complete collection of his papers and writings is preserved in the Deutsches U-Boot Museum located in the Niedersachsen town of Altenbruch, in a room dedicated to his memory.

== Awards ==
- Iron Cross (1914)
  - 2nd Class
  - 1st Class
- Pour le Mérite
- Hanseatic Cross of Lübeck
- Military Merit Order (Bavaria)
- Albert Order (Saxony)
- U-Boat War Badge 1918 version
- The Honour Cross of the World War 1914/1918
- Iron Crescent (Ottoman Empire)

== See also ==
- Atlantic U-boat campaign of World War I
- Battle of Gallipoli

== Bibliography ==
- Dufeil, Yves (2011). Kaiserliche Marine U-Boote 1914-1918 - Dictionnaire biographique des commandants de la marine imperiale allemande [Biographic dictionary of the German Imperial Navy] (in French). Histomar Publications.
- Gibson, R.H.; Prendergast, M. (2002). The German Submarine War 1914–1918. Penzance: Periscope Publishing Ltd. ISBN 1-904381-08-1.
- Gilbert, Martin (2000). La grande storia della prima guerra mondiale [World War I] (in Italian). Milan: Oscar Mondadori. ISBN 88-04-48470-5.
- Gray, Edwyn A. (1994). The U-Boat War: 1914–1918. London: L.Cooper. ISBN 0-85052-405-9.
- Hadley, Michael L. (1995). Count Not the Dead: The Popular Image of the German Submarine. Quebec City: McGill-Queen's University Press. ISBN 0-7735-1282-9.
- Lowell, Thomas (2004). Raiders of the Deep. Annapolis: Naval Institute Press. ISBN 1-59114-861-8.
- Sondhaus, Lawrence (2017). German Submarine Warfare in World War I: The Onset of Total War at Sea. Rowman and Littlefield. ISBN 9781442269552.
