= List of Tobin instruments =

This is a list of Tobin string instruments made by members of the house of Richard Tobin. Many of the instruments made by Tobin and his son, George (sometimes mistakenly referred to as James), are uncredited or branded under the names of their employers or other shops. Identification in such cases is based solely on the quality of craftsmanship, particularly of the scrolls.

== Tobin instruments ==
=== Violins ===
This list has 14 entries.

Year	Location	LOB	Provenance	Notes
1789	Dublin	35.5 cm		One of the earliest known violins ever made by Tobin. Made while working for Thomas Perry in Dublin, possibly towards the end of his apprenticeship or thereafter. Labelled 'Made by Thos. Perry, 6 Anglesea Street, Dublin, No. 533, 1789'. Branded externally 'PERRY/DUBLIN' on the back below the button. Inscribed internally 'Richard Tobin Junior' on the inner table and inner bottom rib.
c. 1800	Waterford			One of the earliest known violins made independently by Tobin. Made whilst working in Waterford, where he is thought to have had family ties. Labelled 'Made by Richard Tobin, Mus. Instr. Maker, Waterford'.
c. 1800	Cork			Made while working for Bartholomew Murphy of Cork. Branded externally 'TOBIN/CORK' beneath the button. Consists of a one-piece front and two-piece back. F-holes have exaggerated Perry styling.
c. 1800	Cork	34.8 cm		Branded externally 'TOBIN/CORK' beneath the button. Consists of a one-piece front and one-piece back. In excellent working condition.
1807	Cork			Branded externally 'TOBIN/CORK' beneath the button and inscribed internally beneath the table. Amati model consisting of a one-piece front and one-piece back. In good working condition with restored sound-post crack. Currently in collection of Tim Wright Fine Violins.
1810	London			An unlabelled instrument (Cozio 104007). Consists of a one-piece front and two-piece back.
1813	London	35.8 cm		Labelled 'Richard Tobin London 1813'. Consists of a one-piece front and one-piece back. In decent working condition.
c. 1820	London			An unlabelled instrument (Cozio 104008). Consists of a one-piece front and two-piece back.
c. 1820	London			Labelled 'Copy of the Maker's Inscription/written under the table of this/violin :—/MADE BY/RICHARD TOBIN,/LONDON,/1820.'. Consists of a one-piece front and two-piece back.
c. 1820	London	35.0 cm		Made for Lockey Hill of London. Consists of a one-piece spruce front and one-piece maple back with stop length 19.2 cm and string length of 32.7 cm.
c. 1820	London	35.5 cm	Emma Pantel	In the collection of The Harrison-Frank Family Foundation. Consists of a one-piece front and two-piece back with widths of 16.5 cm and 20.4 cm.
c. 1825	London	35.5 cm		Sold by Ingles & Hayday in November 2021 for £10,200 (Lot 109). Branded 'Tobin' internally on the back and on the bottom block. Consists of a one-piece front and a two-piece back.
1834	London	35.0 cm		Sold by Bonhams in November 2008 for £5,160 (Lot 118). Labelled 'Richard Tobin London 1834'. Consists of a one-piece front with golden brown varnish. In excellent working condition with minor blemishes.
c. 1840	London	35.9 cm		Chimei Museum collection. Sold by Sotheby's in March 2008 for £9,375 (Lot 6). Branded 'Tobin' internally on the back and by the tailpin. Consists of a one-piece front and a two-piece back. Sold with the certificate of W. E. Hill & Sons, London, dated 20 November 1957.

=== Violas ===
This list has 5 entries.

Year	Location	LOB	Provenance	Notes
1810	London	38.4 cm		Sold by Phillips in September 2001 for £3,161.77 (Lot 40). Consists of a two-piece back, varnish of a brown colour. Minor restored blemishes only.
c. 1810	London	38.9 cm		Sold by Phillips in March 1991 for £2,860 (Lot 229).
c. 1820	London	38.7 cm		Sold by Skinner in October 2007 for $5,875 (Lot 346). Stamped internally 'TOBIN, LONDON'. Consists of a one-piece front and two-piece back.
c. 1820	London	38.8 cm		An unlabelled instrument (Cozio 10059). Consists of a one-piece front and two-piece back. Sold by J & A Beare in 1952.
1820	London	38.9 cm		Labelled 'Richard Tobin London 1820'. Consists of a two-piece front and two-piece back with red varnish. For sale by Ingles & Hayday (Lot 217) for £14,000-£18,000. Sold with certificate of J & A Beare, 12 February 2014.

=== Cellos ===
This list has 3 entries.

Year	Location	LOB	Provenance	Notes
c. 1820	London			For sale by JP Guivier in 2023 for £115,000. Consists of a one-piece front and two-piece back with double purfling.
c. 1820	London			For sale by JP Guivier in 2023 for £85,000. Consists of a one-piece front and two-piece back.
1826	London		Thomas Mesa	Used to record soundtracks for the first movies ever created.

=== Pochettes ===
This list has 1 entry.

Year	Location	LOB	Provenance	Notes
c. 1815	London			In the collection of the National Music Museum, Vermillion, South Dakota. Consists of a one-piece front and one-piece back. Total length of 39.5 cm.

=== Guitars ===
This list has 1 entry.

Year	Location	LOB	Provenance	Notes
1826	London			An English Guitar by Louis Panormo, sold by Brompton's in March 2017 for £960 (Lot 285). The brass machines are stamped 'Tobin' beneath a crown, possibly made or sold by one of the Tobins. The rollers are made from bone. String length of 63.5 cm.
