= List of shipwrecks in December 1914 =

The list of shipwrecks in December 1914 includes ships sunk, foundered, grounded, or otherwise lost during December 1914.

== 1 December ==
List of shipwrecks: 1 December 1914
Ship	State	Description
Anna	Italy	The cargo ship was destroyed by fire in the Atlantic Ocean 10 nautical miles (19 km) south of the Wolf Rock, Cornwall, United Kingdom. Her crew were rescued; eight of them by Mira (United Kingdom).
Richmond	United States	During a voyage in Southeast Alaska from Ketchikan to Wrangel, Territory of Alaska, the 12-gross register ton, 34.4-foot (10.5 m) motor vessel sank after striking a submerged log in Clarence Strait in the Alexander Archipelago. Her two-man crew survived.
Val de Saire	France	The schooner, sprang a leak in the Atlantic Ocean off the Tuskar Rock, Ireland and was abandoned. Her ten crew were rescued by Wexford (United Kingdom) and the Rosslare Lifeboat.

== 2 December ==
List of shipwrecks: 2 December 1914
Ship	State	Description
Carma	Sweden	World War I: The steamer left Amsterdam for Blyth and disappeared with all hands, a crew of fifteen. The weather was not bad, so the official Swedish history of war losses states that the probable cause was a mine explosion.
Drummuir	United Kingdom	World War I: The sailing vessel was scuttled in the Atlantic Ocean 70 nautical miles (130 km) east by north of Cape Horn, Chile by SMS Leipzig (Imperial German Navy).
HMT Tom Tit	Royal Navy	The naval trawler was wrecked at Peterhead, Aberdeenshire

== 4 December ==
List of shipwrecks: 4 December 1914
Ship	State	Description
Bellevue	United Kingdom	World War I: The cargo ship was captured and scuttled in the Atlantic Ocean by SMS Kronprinz Wilhelm (Imperial German Navy).

== 5 December ==
List of shipwrecks: 5 December 1914
Ship	State	Description
Alice M. Lawrence	United States	The 305-foot (93 m), 3,132-gross register ton six-masted schooner was wrecked on Tuckernuck Shoal in Nantucket Sound off the coast of Massachusetts at (41°24′13″N 070°13′00″W) after her seams open in rough seas, or striking the wreck of French Van Gilder. A gale the next day pushed her higher on the Shoal and she broke up during later storms.
Andrew Nebinger	United States	The schooner went ashore on Little Gull Island, New York. Refloated and returned to service.
Charcas	United Kingdom	World War I: The cargo ship was captured and scuttled in the Pacific Ocean 70 nautical miles (130 km) south by west of Valparaíso, Chile by SMS Prinz Eitel Friedrich (Imperial German Navy).
Harlington	United Kingdom	The cargo ship was driven aground in the North Sea on the Middle Sunk Sands. All fifteen crew were rescued by the Clacton Lifeboat.
Waterloo	Norway	The cargo ship foundered in the English Channel off The Lizard, Cornwall, United Kingdom with the loss of fourteen of her seventeen crew. The survivors were rescued by Cloch (United Kingdom).

== 7 December ==
List of shipwrecks: 7 December 1914
Ship	State	Description
Vedra	United Kingdom	The steam tanker, arriving at Barrow-in-Furness, England from Sabine, Texas with a cargo of benzine, went aground off Walney Island in a storm and subsequently exploded and caught fire. Of the crew of 36 all but two were consumed by the fire, and only one of those rescued survived his injuries.

== 8 December ==
List of shipwrecks: 8 December 1914
Ship	State	Description
SMS Gneisenau	Imperial German Navy	World War I: Battle of the Falkland Islands: The Scharnhorst-class armored cruiser was shelled and sunk in the Atlantic Ocean off the Falkland Islands by the battlecruiser HMS Inflexible (Royal Navy) with the loss of 598 of her 764 crew.
SMS Leipzig	Imperial German Navy	World War I: Battle of the Falkland Islands: The Bremen-class light cruiser was shelled and sunk in the Atlantic Ocean off the Falkland Islands by the armored cruiser HMS Cornwall and light cruiser HMS Glasgow (both Royal Navy) with the loss of 270 of her 288 crew.
SMS Nürnberg	Imperial German Navy	World War I: Battle of the Falkland Islands: The Königsberg-class light cruiser was shelled and sunk in the Atlantic Ocean off the Falkland Islands by the armored cruiser HMS Kent (Royal Navy) with the loss of 327 of her 334 crew.
SMS Scharnhorst	Imperial German Navy	SMS Scharnhorst World War I: Battle of the Falkland Islands: The Scharnhorst-class armored cruiser was shelled and sunk in the Atlantic Ocean off the Falkland Islands by the battlecruiser HMS Inflexible (Royal Navy) with the loss of all 860 crew. Wreck located 2019.
SMS Senator Strandes	Imperial German Navy	The Vorpostenboot was lost on this date.

== 9 December ==
List of shipwrecks: 9 December 1914
Ship	State	Description
Emma	Sweden	The cargo ship ran aground on the Knavestone Rock, in the North Sea off the coast of Northumberland, United Kingdom. She sank on or before 13 December. The crew survived.
SM U-11	Imperial German Navy	World War I: The Type U 9 submarine struck a mine in the North Sea off the coast of Belgium (51°06′N 1°09′E) and sank with the loss of all 26 crew.

== 11 December ==
List of shipwrecks: 11 December 1914
Ship	State	Description
Earl Howard	United Kingdom	World War I: The trawler struck a mine and sank in the North Sea 90 nautical miles (170 km) north east by north of the Spurn Lightship (United Kingdom) with the loss of nine of her crew.
Emma & John	United Kingdom	The smack was driven ashore and wrecked east of Lyme Regis, Dorset.
Rosaleen	United Kingdom	The cargo ship ran aground in Oxwich Bay. Her crew were rescued. She was refloated on 15 December.

== 12 December ==
List of shipwrecks: 12 December 1914
Ship	State	Description
Ispolnitelny	Imperial Russian Navy	The Leytenant Burakov-class destroyer sank in the Baltic Sea off Gotland, Sweden, during a minelaying sortie either because of the explosion of her own mines or because she capsized in a violent snowstorm, according to different sources.
Kildalton	United Kingdom	World War I: The sailing vessel was scuttled in the Pacific Ocean 870 nautical miles (1,610 km) south west by south of Valparaíso, Chile by SMS Prinz Eitel Friedrich (Imperial German Navy).
Letuchy	Imperial Russian Navy	The Leytenant Burakov-class destroyer sank in the Baltic Sea off Gotland, Sweden, during a minelaying sortie either because of the explosion of her own mines or because she capsized in a violent snowstorm, according to different sources.

== 13 December ==
List of shipwrecks: 13 December 1914
Ship	State	Description
Mesûdiye	Ottoman Navy	World War I: The Mesûdiye-class central battery ironclad was torpedoed and sunk in the Dardanelles by the submarine HMS B11 (Royal Navy) with the loss of 37 of her 673 crew.
Silurian	United Kingdom	The coaster ran aground at Porto, Portugal. She broke in two and was a total loss. Her crew were rescued by the salvage vessel Leixões (Portugal).

== 15 December ==
List of shipwrecks: 15 December 1914
Ship	State	Description
Gael	United States	The barque capsized off the Virginia Capes with the loss of a crew member. Survivors were rescued by Thelma (Norway).

== 16 December ==
List of shipwrecks: 16 December 1914
Ship	State	Description
Anna Greta	Sweden	World War I: The cargo steamer was last heard from departing Hull bound for Stockholm. Presumed sunk by a mine. Seventeen casualties.
Constance	United Kingdom	World War I: The trawler was shelled and sunk in the North Sea off Hartlepool, County Durham by Kaiserliche Marine warships.
Elterwater	United Kingdom	World War I: The cargo ship struck a mine placed by the cruiser SMS Kolberg (Imperial German Navy) and sank in the North Sea 3 nautical miles (5.6 km) east of Scarborough, Yorkshire with the loss of six of her crew.
HMT Margaret	Royal Navy	The naval trawler was lost on this date.
Princess Olga	United Kingdom	World War I: The cargo ship struck a mine and sank in the North Sea 5 nautical miles (9.3 km) east north east of Scarborough.
Vaaren	Norway	World War I: The collier struck a mine and sank 3 nautical miles (5.6 km) north-east of Filey.
Wayside Flower	United Kingdom	World War I: The trawler was shelled and sunk in the North Sea off Hartlepool by Kaiserliche Marine warships.

== 17 December ==
List of shipwrecks: 17 December 1914
Ship	State	Description
Fred Tyler	United States	The schooner sank at dock at Stonington, Connecticut. Later refloated and returned to service.
HMT Lorenzo	Royal Navy	The naval trawler was wrecked in Hoy Sound, Orkney Islands.

== 18 December ==
List of shipwrecks: 18 December 1914
Ship	State	Description
Jubilee	United Kingdom	The schooner was driven ashore at Orfordness, Suffolk and was wrecked with the loss of one of her three crew.
Kelvindale	United Kingdom	The cargo ship ran aground on the Anegada Reef, Tortola, Virgin Islands. She was refloated on 28 December but found to be severely damaged.
Kisagata Maru	Japan	The cargo ship collided with a hopper barge at Moji-Ku, Kitakyūshū and sank. She was declared a total loss.
Rivulet	United Kingdom	The cargo ship struck a rock off the Hole in the Wall Reef, Abaco, Bahamas and foundered.
SM U-5	Imperial German Navy	The Type U 5 submarine sank in the North Sea off the coast of Belgium with the loss of all 29 crew.
West Cock	United Kingdom	The tug collided with Needles (United Kingdom) in the River Mersey at Liverpool, Lancashire and sank with the loss of two of her crew.

== 19 December ==
List of shipwrecks: 19 December 1914
Ship	State	Description
Coos Bay	United States	The steamer was wrecked at Ventura, California. Some salvage of wreck occurred later.
HMT Orianda	Royal Navy	World War I: The naval trawler struck a mine placed by the cruiser SMS Kolberg (Imperial German Navy) and sank in the North Sea off Scarborough, Yorkshire with the loss of a crew member. Survivors were rescued by HMS Brighton (Royal Navy).
Tritonia	United Kingdom	World War I: The cargo ship struck a mine and sank in the Atlantic Ocean 22 nautical miles (41 km) north west of Tory Island, County Donegal.

== 20 December ==
List of shipwrecks: 20 December 1914
Ship	State	Description
Curie	French Navy	World War I: The Brumaire-class submarine was scuttled at Pula, Austria-Hungary. She was later refloated and entered service as U-14 (Austro-Hungarian Navy).
HMT Garmo	Royal Navy	World War I: The naval trawler struck a mine and sank in the North Sea with the loss of five of her crew.
Montrose	United Kingdom	The ocean liner was wrecked on the Goodwin Sands, Kent.

== 22 December ==
List of shipwrecks: 22 December 1914
Ship	State	Description
Brazil	United Kingdom	The steam barge was in collision with Megantic (United Kingdom) at Liverpool, Lancashire and sank. Her crew were rescued.
Boston	Norway	The 1,168 ton cargo ship SS Boston struck a mine laid by SMS Kolberg and wrecked on the rocky shore of Filey Brigg, Yorkshire. It drifted further south before running aground on the Black Dinks rocks at Filey Brigg. Scrapped on site.

== 23 December ==
List of shipwrecks: 23 December 1914
Ship	State	Description
Ocana	United Kingdom	World War I: The 125-foot (38 m), 260-ton steam trawler struck a mine and sank in the North Sea 75 nautical miles (139 km) north east by east of Flamborough Head, Yorkshire with the loss of nine of her crew.

== 25 December ==
List of shipwrecks: 25 December 1914
Ship	State	Description
Eli	Norway	World War I: The cargo ship struck a mine and sank in the North Sea. All sixteen people on board were rescued by Alistair (United Kingdom).
Gem	United Kingdom	World War I: The cargo ship struck a mine placed by the cruiser SMS Kolberg (Imperial German Navy) and sank in the North Sea 3.5 nautical miles (6.5 km) south east by east of Scarborough, North Riding of Yorkshire with the loss of ten of her crew.
HMT Night Hawk	Royal Navy	World War I: The naval trawler was lost on this date when she struck a mine placed by the cruiser SMS Kolberg (Imperial German Navy) 5.5 nautical miles (10.2 km) east of Scarborough. Six of her crew of thirteen were killed.

== 26 December ==
List of shipwrecks: 26 December 1914
Ship	State	Description
HMT Fair Isle	Royal Navy	The naval trawler was lost on this date.
Leersum	Netherlands	World War I: The cargo ship struck a mine placed by the cruiser SMS Kolberg (Imperial German Navy) and sank in the North Sea off Filey, Yorkshire, United Kingdom with the loss of two of her twenty crew.
Linaria	United Kingdom	World War I: The cargo ship struck a mine and sank in the North Sea 2.5 nautical miles (4.6 km) north north east of Filey.

== 27 December ==
List of shipwrecks: 27 December 1914
Ship	State	Description
Niggem	United Kingdom	The coaster foundered in the Mediterranean Sea whilst on a voyage from Alexandria, Egypt to Barcelona, Spain. Eight of her crew survived.
HMS Success	Royal Navy	The B-class destroyer foundered in the North Sea off Fife Ness.

== 28 December ==
List of shipwrecks: 28 December 1914
Ship	State	Description
Hemisphere	United Kingdom	World War I: The 3,486 GRT cargo ship on a voyage from Hull for River Plate with a cargo of coal, was captured in the Atlantic Ocean 400 nautical miles (740 km) north east of Pernambuco, Brazil by SMS Kronprinz Wilhelm (Imperial German Navy). She was scuttled on 8 January 1915.

== 29 December ==
List of shipwrecks: 29 December 1914
Ship	State	Description
Apollo	United Kingdom	The tug sank at Harwich, Essex during a storm.
Björgvin	Norway	The 2,792 GRT cargo ship on a trip from New York for Gothenburg with general cargo, foundered in the Atlantic Ocean 60 nautical miles (110 km) north of Rockall, Inverness-shire, United Kingdom. Her crew were rescued by Brynhild (Norway).

== 30 December ==
List of shipwrecks: 30 December 1914
Ship	State	Description
Giuseppe Vicava	Italy	The barque ran aground in the Atlantic Ocean 2 nautical miles (3.7 km) off Pensacola, Florida, United States.
Ivy	United Kingdom	World War I: The trawler struck a mine and sank in the North Sea with the loss of all five crew.
Numidian	United Kingdom	World War I: The Admiralty-requisitioned cargo ship was scuttled in Kirk Sound between Lamb Holm Island and mainland Scapa Flow (58°53′N 02°53′W) as a blockship. The wreck was pulled parallel to shore in 1919. It was scrapped in 1923 or 1924.
Ron	Ottoman Navy	The auxiliary minelayer was lost on this date.
Stranton	United Kingdom	The cargo ship collided with the steamer Benvorlich (United Kingdom) in The Downs and foundered. All eighteen crew survived.

== 31 December ==
List of shipwrecks: 31 December 1914
Ship	State	Description
Daito Maru No.2	Japan	The cargo ship foundered in the East China Sea off Port Hamilton, Korea with the loss of 24 of her 32 crew.
Jean	France	World War I: The barque was set afire and sunk 1.5 nautical miles (2.8 km) off Easter Island by SMS Prinz Eitel Friedrich (Imperial German Navy).
Manja Maru	Japan	The cargo ship collided with Tosan Maru at Tokyo and sank.

== Unknown date ==
List of shipwrecks: Unknown date 1914
Ship	State	Description
Asnières	France	The 3,100-ton Cape Horner ran aground under Castle Point, St Mawes, Cornwall, while entering Falmouth harbour without a pilot. She was refloated the following month and returned to service.
Bogor	Netherlands	The ship was wrecked on the Portuguese coast.
Glenmorven	United Kingdom	The cargo ship departed the River Tyne for an Italian port. No further trace, presumed foundered with the loss of all hands.
Semantha	Norway	World War I: The barque was captured and scuttled in the Atlantic Ocean off the coast of Brazil by SMS Kronprinz Wilhelm (Imperial German Navy). Her crew were taken as prisoners of war.
Therese Heymann	United Kingdom	The cargo ship departed the River Tyne for an Italian port. No further trace, presumed foundered with the loss of all hands.
