= HMS Pathfinder (1904) =

Lead ship of the Pathfinder class of scout cruisers

Coordinates: 56°07′21″N 02°09′15″E

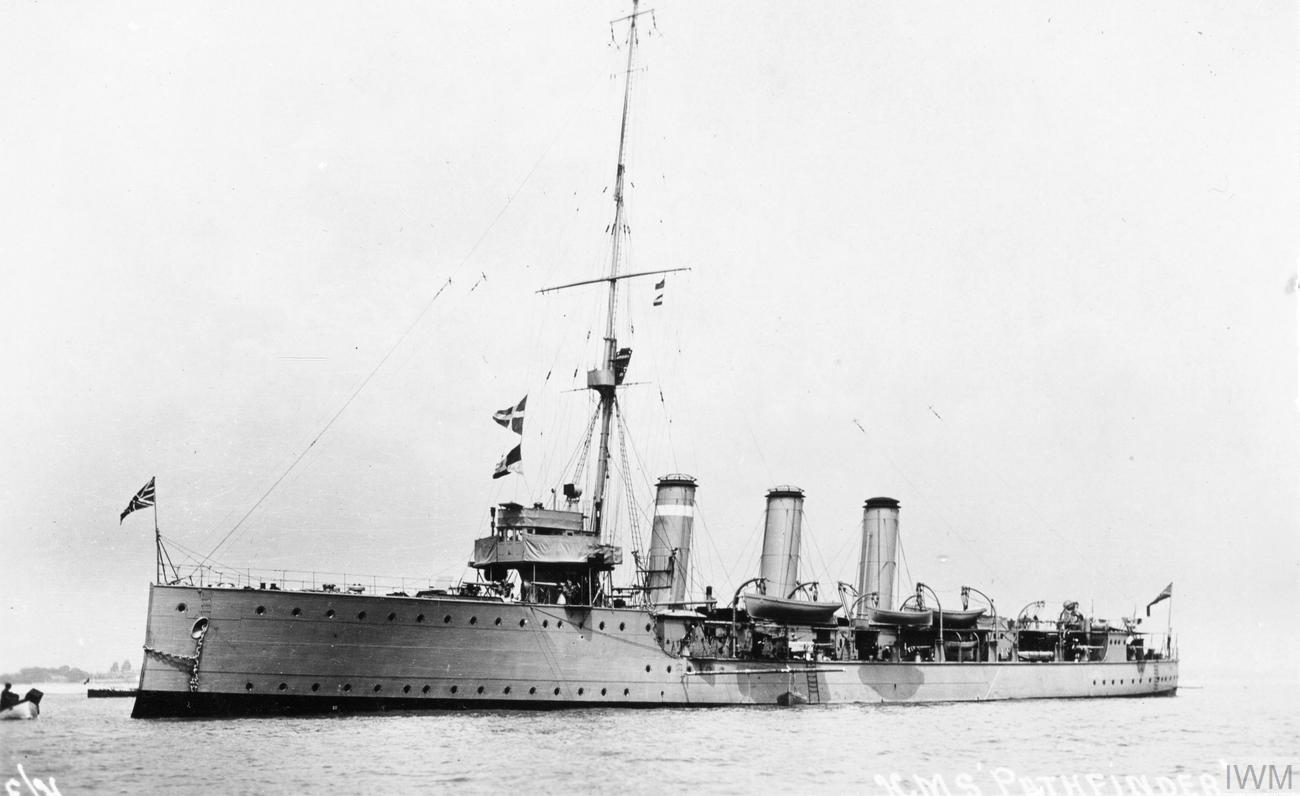
- HMS Pathfinder

History

United Kingdom
- Name: Pathfinder
- Builder: Cammell Laird, Birkenhead
- Laid down: 15 August 1903
- Launched: 16 July 1904
- Commissioned: 18 July 1905
- Fate: Sunk, 5 September 1914

General characteristics (as built)
- Type: Scout cruiser
- Displacement: 2,940 long tons (2,987 t)
- Length: 370 ft (112.8 m) (p/p)
- Beam: 38 ft 9 in (11.8 m)
- Draught: 15 ft 2 in (4.6 m) (deep load)
- Installed power: 16,500 ihp (12,300 kW); 12 Laird-Normand boilers
- Propulsion: 2 Shafts, 2 triple-expansion steam engines
- Speed: 25 knots (46 km/h; 29 mph)
- Range: 3,400 nmi (6,300 km; 3,900 mi) at 10 knots (19 km/h; 12 mph)
- Complement: 289
- Armament: 10 × QF 12-pdr 3 in (76 mm) guns; 8 × QF 3-pdr (47 mm) guns; 2 × 18 in (450 mm) torpedo tubes
- Armour: Waterline belt: 2 in (51 mm); Deck: 0.75–1.125 in (19.1–28.6 mm); Conning tower: 3 in (76 mm)

HMS Pathfinder was the lead ship of her class of two British scout cruisers, and was the first ship ever to be sunk by a self-propelled torpedo fired by submarine (the American Civil War sloop-of-war USS Housatonic had been sunk by a spar torpedo). She was built by Cammell Laird, Birkenhead, launched on 16 July 1904, and commissioned on 18 July 1905. She was originally to have been named Fastnet, but was renamed prior to construction. During the beginning of World War I, Pathfinder was sunk on 5 September 1914 by the German U-boat U-21.

== Construction ==
In May 1902, the British Admiralty issued an invitation to tender to several shipbuilding yards for a new type of small cruiser, intended to act as leaders for flotillas of destroyers. The new ships required high speed to keep up with the destroyers, good seaworthiness and good communications equipment, but as they were only intended to fight destroyer-type vessels, a heavy armament was not specified. The Admiralty produced a broad specification for the ships, normal practice at the time for destroyers, requiring a speed of 25 knots (46 km/h; 29 mph), a range of 2,000 nautical miles (3,700 km; 2,300 mi), light armour and an armament of ten 12-pounder (3 in, 76 mm) guns, eight 3-pounder (47 mm) guns and two torpedo tubes.

A total of eight scout cruisers were ordered, two each from Armstrong Whitworth, Fairfield, Cammell Laird and Vickers. Cammell Laird's ships, the Pathfinder class, were 379 feet 0 inches (115.52 m) long overall and 370 feet 0 inches (112.78 m) between perpendiculars, with a beam of 38 feet 9 inches (11.81 m) and a draught of 15 feet 2 inches (4.62 m). Displacement was 2,940 long tons (2,990 t) normal and 3,240 long tons (3,290 t) deep load. Twelve Normand water-tube boilers fed steam to two 4-cylinder triple-expansion steam engines rated at 16,500 indicated horsepower (12,300 kW) and driving two shafts. 17,582 indicated horsepower (13,111 kW) was achieved using forced draft during sea trials, allowing a trial speed of 25.48 knots (47.19 km/h; 29.32 mph). Range was 3,400 nmi (6,300 km; 3,900 mi) at 10 knots (19 km/h; 12 mph). A 2 inches (51 mm) thick armour belt protected the ship's engine rooms, with a 3/8 inch (9.5 mm) armoured deck over the ships engines and an armoured deck of 1/2–1 1/2 inches (13–38 mm) elsewhere, while the ship's conning tower was protected with 3 inches of armour.

The main armament of the Pathfinder class consisted of ten quick-firing (QF) 12-pounder 18 cwt guns. (Note: "Cwt" is the abbreviation for hundredweight, 18 cwt referring to the weight of the gun.) Three guns were mounted abreast on the forecastle and the quarterdeck, with the remaining four guns positioned port and starboard amidships. They also carried eight 3-pounder Hotchkiss guns and two above-water 18-inch (450 mm) torpedo tubes, one on each broadside.

Pathfinder was laid down at Cammell Laird's Birkenhead shipyard on 15 August 1903, was launched on 16 July 1904 and completed on 18 July 1905.

== Career ==
Not long after completion, two additional 12-pounder guns were added and the 3-pounder guns were replaced with six 6-pounder guns. In 1911–12 they were rearmed with nine 4-inch (102 mm) guns. Pathfinder spent her early career with the Atlantic Fleet, Channel Fleet (1906) and then the Home Fleet (1907).

In November 1907, Pathfinder was docked at Chatham Dockyard for inspection of her underwater fittings. On 8 February 1908, the torpedo gunboat Leda collided with the old cruiser Andromache in Harwich harbour and was holed, needing to be beached to avoid sinking. Pathfinder accompanied Leda to Sheerness Dockyard where the gunboat was repaired. In August 1909, Pathfinder, now leader of the 1st Destroyer Flotilla, was under refit at Sheerness.

When the aviator Gustav Hamel's aircraft went missing when crossing the English Channel on 23 May 1914, Pathfinder, leading the 8th Destroyer Flotilla, took part in unsuccessful search operations for the missing pilot. At the start of the First World War she was part of the 8th Destroyer Flotilla based at Rosyth in the Firth of Forth and commanded by Capt Francis Martin-Leake.

Pathfinder was sunk off St. Abbs Head, Berwickshire, Scotland, on 5 September 1914 by the German U-21, commanded by Kapitänleutnant Otto Hersing. The ship was struck in a magazine, which exploded, causing the ship to sink within minutes with the loss of 259 men.

=== Sinking ===
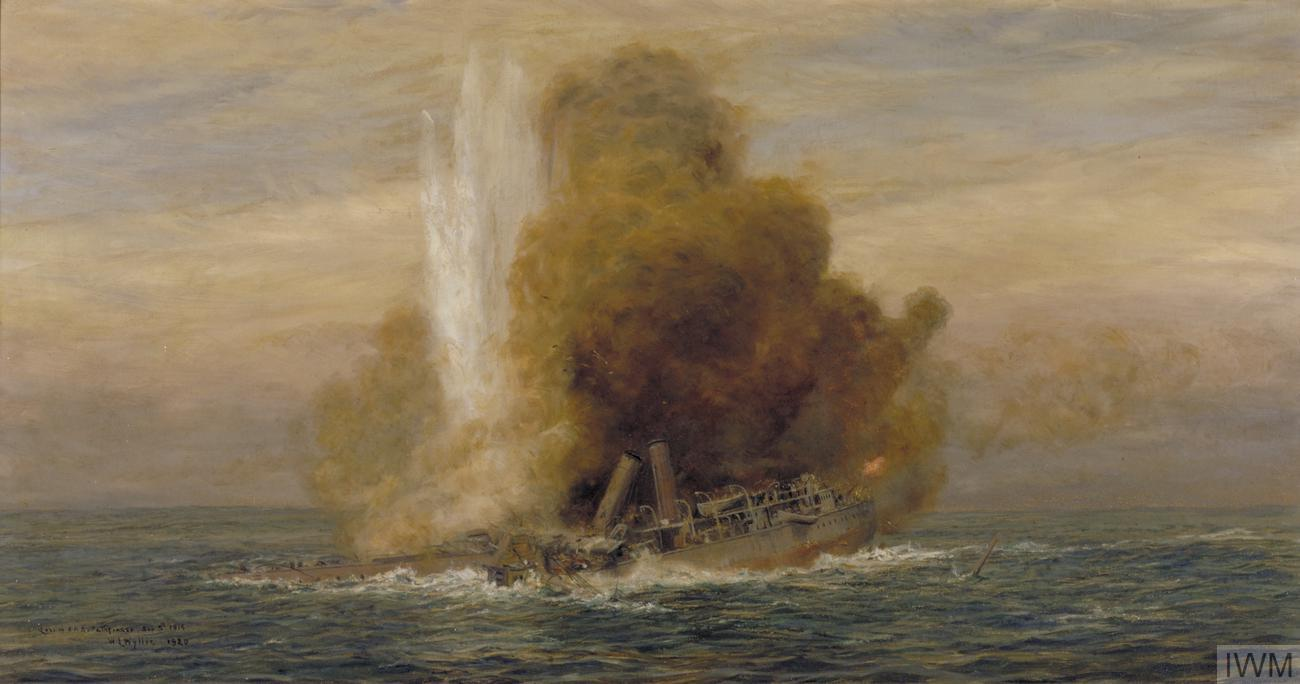
The loss of HMS Pathfinder

At the beginning of September 1914, Otto Hersing, commanding officer of U-21, ventured to the Firth of Forth, home to the major British naval base at Rosyth. Hersing is known to have penetrated the Firth of Forth as far as the Carlingnose Battery beneath the Forth Bridge. At one point the periscope was spotted and the battery opened fire but without success. Overnight Hersing withdrew from the Forth, patrolling the coast from the Isle of May southwards. On the morning of 5 September, he observed HMS Pathfinder on a south-southeast course, followed by elements of the 8th Destroyer Flotilla. At midday, the destroyers altered course back towards the Isle of May while Pathfinder continued her patrol. Shortly thereafter, Hersing spotted Pathfinder on her return journey through his periscope and resolved to make an attack.

At 1543 U-21 fired a single 50 cm (20 in) Type G/6 torpedo at a range of 2,000 yards (1,800 m). At 1545 lookouts spotted a torpedo wake heading towards the starboard bow and the officer of the watch, Lieutenant-Commander Favell, attempted to take evasive action by ordering the starboard engine be put astern and the port engine at full ahead while the wheel was turned hard a port, the manoeuvre was not in time and the torpedo struck the ship beneath the bridge. The detonation apparently set off cordite bags in the forward magazine which caused a second, more massive explosion within the fore section of the ship, essentially destroying everything forward of the bridge. Broken in two, Pathfinder instantly began sinking, dragging most of her crew down with her and leaving a massive pall of smoke to mark the ship's location. The vessel sank so quickly, in fact, that there was insufficient time to launch lifeboats. (Indeed, the remains of a lifeboat davit and rope can still be seen on the wreck, demonstrating the speed with which the vessel sank.)

There is significant confusion regarding the numbers of survivors. On 6 September The Times declared that 58 men had been rescued but that four had died of injuries. The fact that it is impossible to determine how many were on board that day adds to the problem, but modern research indicates that in all probability, there were 268 personnel on board plus two civilian canteen assistants. There were just twenty known survivors. Four more men died of injuries or exposure and are buried at Dalmeny in Fife and Warriston near Edinburgh. One unknown Pathfinder sailor is buried at Dunbar overlooking the scene of the sinking. The explosion was seen by British writer Aldous Huxley (while staying at Northfield House, St. Abbs).

Despite the events of 5 September having been easily visible from shore, the authorities attempted to cover up the fact that Pathfinder had been sunk by a torpedo, insisting instead that it had struck a naval mine. The reason for this is unclear, but probably has to do with the Admiralty's position that submarines — a still new and largely untested weapons platform — lacked the capacity to sink a surface warship with a torpedo. A local paper, however, The Scotsman, published an eye-witness account by an Eyemouth fisherman, who had assisted in the rescue, that confirmed rumors that a submarine had been responsible. (However The Scotsman also reported that Pathfinder had been attacked by two U-boats and had accounted for the second one in her death throes. Admiralty intelligence later claimed that cruisers had cornered the U-boat responsible and shelled it to oblivion.) The sinking of Pathfinder by a submarine made both sides aware of the potential vulnerability of large ships to attack by submarines.

== Footnotes ==
=== Works cited ===
- Chesneau, Roger & Kolesnik, Eugene M., eds. (1979). Conway's All the World's Fighting Ships 1860–1905. Greenwich: Conway Maritime Press. ISBN 0-8317-0302-4.
- Friedman, Norman (2009). British Destroyers From Earliest Days to the Second World War. Annapolis, Maryland: Naval Institute Press. ISBN 978-1-59114-081-8.
- Friedman, Norman (2011). Naval Weapons of World War I. Barnsley, South Yorkshire, UK: Seaforth. ISBN 978-1-84832-100-7.

=== General references ===
- Corbett, Julian (March 1997). Naval Operations to the Battle of the Falklands. History of the Great War: Based on Official Documents. Vol. I (2nd, reprint of the 1938 ed.). London and Nashville, Tennessee: Imperial War Museum and Battery Press. ISBN 0-89839-256-X.
- Gardiner, Robert & Gray, Randal, eds. (1985). Conway's All the World's Fighting Ships 1906–1921. Annapolis, Maryland: Naval Institute Press. ISBN 0-85177-245-5.
