= SMS Prinz Eitel Friedrich =

SMS Prinz Eitel Friedrich may refer to:

- SS Prinz Eitel Friedrich (1904), a German auxiliary cruiser taken over by the US and commissioned as USS DeKalb (ID-3010) during the First World War
- SMS Prinz Eitel Friedrich (1915), an unfinished Mackensen-class battlecruiser built for the German Navy during the First World War
