= SM U-21 (Germany) =

U-boat built for the Imperial German Navy (1913)

Coordinates: 54°14′30″N 04°02′50″E

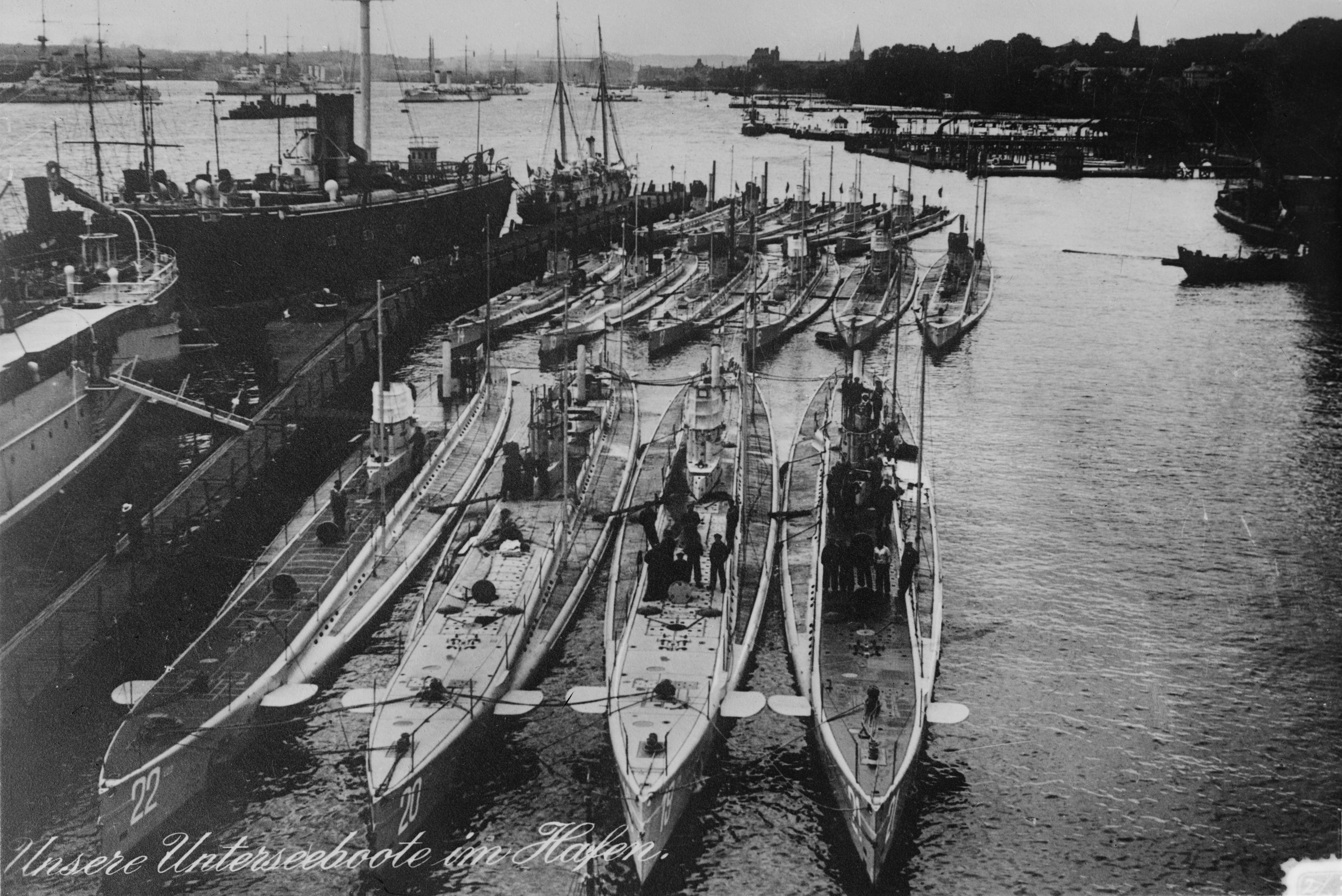
- SM U-21 (rightmost boat in foreground)

History

German Empire
- Name: U-21
- Ordered: 25 November 1910
- Builder: Kaiserliche Werft Danzig
- Yard number: 15
- Laid down: 27 October 1911
- Launched: 8 February 1913
- Commissioned: 22 October 1913
- Fate: Sunk accidentally, 22 February 1919

Austria-Hungary
- Name: U-36
- Commissioned: 21 September 1915
- Decommissioned: 1 October 1916
- Fate: Returned to Imperial German Navy command

General characteristics
- Class & type: Type U 19 submarine
- Displacement: 650 t (640 long tons) surfaced; 837 t (824 long tons) submerged
- Length: 64.15 m (210 ft 6 in)
- Beam: 6.10 m (20 ft)
- Height: 8.10 m (26 ft 7 in)
- Draft: 3.58 m (11 ft 9 in)
- Propulsion: 2 shafts; 2 × MAN 8-cylinder two stroke diesel engines; 2 × AEG double Motordynamos
- Speed: 15.4 knots (28.5 km/h; 17.7 mph) surfaced; 9.5 knots (17.6 km/h; 10.9 mph) submerged
- Complement: 4 officers, 25 men
- Armament: 4 × 50 cm (19.7 in) torpedo tubes; 1 × 8.8 cm (3.5 in) SK L/30 gun (from 1916 2 ×)

Service record
- Part of: Imperial German Navy: III Flotilla; 1 August 1914 – 5 June 1915; Constantinople Flotilla; 5 June 1915 – unknown end; Pola Flotilla; Unknown start – 4 March 1917; III Flotilla; 4 March 1917 – 11 November 1918
- Commanders: Kptlt. Otto Hersing; 22 October 1913 – 31 August 1918; Kptlt. Friedrich Klein; 1 September – 11 November 1918
- Operations: 11 patrols
- Victories: 36 merchant ships sunk (79,005 GRT); 4 warships sunk (34,575 tons); 2 merchant ships damaged (8,918 GRT)

SM U-21 was a Type U 19 U-boat built for the Imperial German Navy shortly before World War I. The third of four Type U-19-class submarines, these were the first U-boats in German service to be equipped with diesel engines. U-21 was built between 1911 and October 1913 at the Kaiserliche Werft (Imperial Shipyard) in Danzig. She was armed with four torpedo tubes and a single deck gun; a second gun was added during her career.

In September 1914, U-21 became the first submarine to sink a ship with a self-propelled torpedo when she destroyed the cruiser HMS Pathfinder off the Firth of Forth. She also sank several transports in the English Channel and the Irish Sea later in the year, all in accordance with the cruiser rules then in effect. In early 1915, U-21 was transferred to the Mediterranean Sea to support the Ottoman Empire against the Anglo-French attacks during the Gallipoli Campaign. Shortly after her arrival, she sank the British battleships HMS Triumph and HMS Majestic while they were bombarding Ottoman positions at Gallipoli. Further successes followed in the Mediterranean in 1916, including the sinking of the French armored cruiser Amiral Charner in February.

Throughout 1916, U-21 served in the Austro-Hungarian Navy as U-36, since Germany was not yet at war with Italy and thus could not legally attack Italian warships under the German flag. She returned to Germany in March 1917 to join the unrestricted commerce war against British maritime trade. In 1918, she was withdrawn from front line service and was employed as a training submarine for new crews. She survived the war and sank while under tow by a British warship in 1919.

== Design ==
U-21 was 64.15 meters (210 ft 6 in) long overall with a beam of 6.10 m (20 ft) and a height of 8.10 m (26 ft 7 in). She displaced 650 metric tons (640 long tons) surfaced and 837 t (824 long tons) submerged. The boat's propulsion system consisted of a pair of 8-cylinder 2-stroke diesel engines manufactured by MAN for use on the surface, and two electric double motor-dynamos built by AEG for use while submerged. U-21 and her sister boats were the first German submarines to be equipped with diesel engines. The electric motors were powered by a bank of two 110-cell batteries. U-21 could cruise at a top speed of 15.4 knots (28.5 km/h; 17.7 mph) on the surface and 9.5 knots (17.6 km/h; 10.9 mph) submerged. Steering was controlled by a pair of hydroplanes forward and another pair aft, and a single rudder.

U-21 was armed with four 50-centimeter (19.7 in) torpedo tubes, which were supplied with a total of six torpedoes. One pair was located in the bow and the other was in the stern. She was initially fitted with a machine gun for use on the surface; by the end of 1914 this was replaced with a 8.8 cm (3.5 in) SK L/30 gun. In 1916, a second 8.8 cm gun was added. U-21 had a crew of four officers and twenty-five enlisted sailors.

== Service history ==
U-21 was built at the Kaiserliche Werft (Imperial Shipyard) in Danzig (now Gdańsk, Poland). She was laid down on 27 October 1911 and launched on 8 February 1913. After fitting-out work was completed, she was commissioned into the fleet on 22 October 1913.

=== North Sea operations ===
At the outbreak of World War I in August 1914, U-21 was based at Heligoland in the German Bight, commanded by Kapitänleutnant (Captain Lieutenant) Otto Hersing. In early August, Hersing took U-21 on a patrol into the Dover Straits but he found no British vessels. On 14 August U-21 went on a second patrol, this time with her sister boats U-19 and U-22, to the northern North Sea between Norway and Scotland. The patrol was an attempt to locate the British blockade line and gather intelligence, but they spotted only a single cruiser and a destroyer off the Norwegian coast. Hersing attempted to enter the Firth of Forth—a major Royal Navy fleet base—later in the month but was unsuccessful.

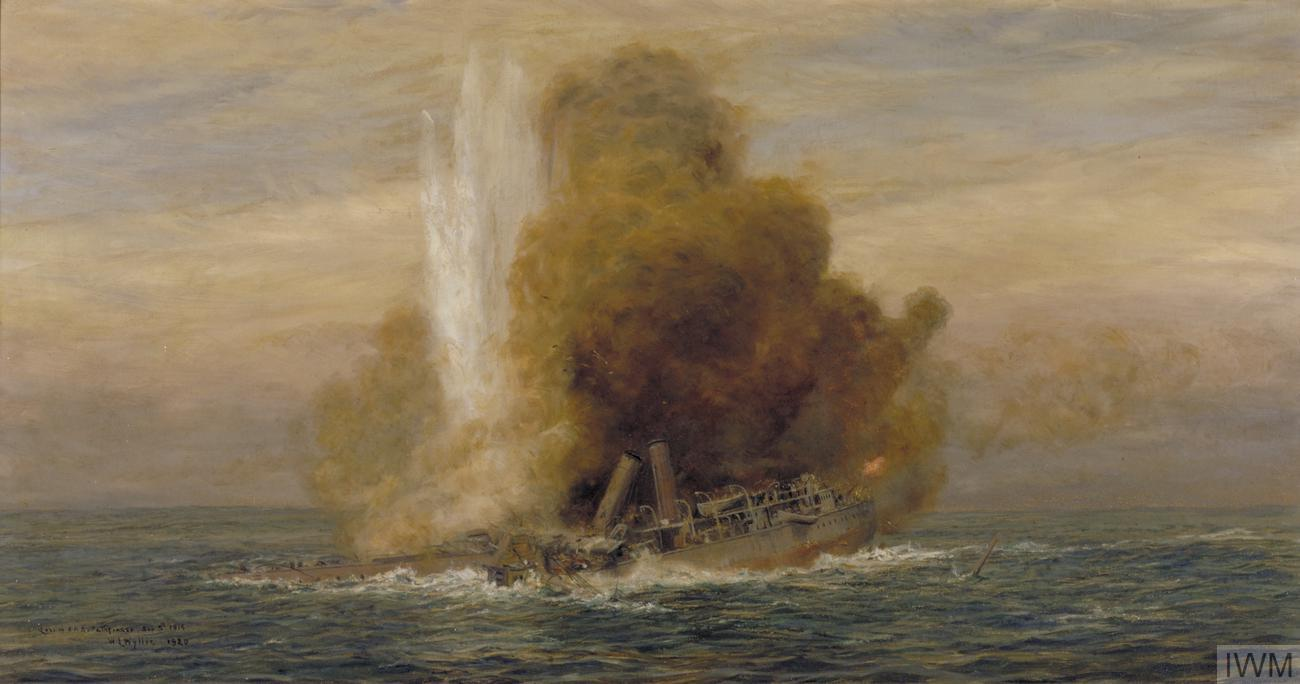
Painting of the sinking of HMS Pathfinder by W L Wyllie

On 5 September 1914, U-21 encountered the British scout cruiser HMS Pathfinder off the Isle of May. Hersing had surfaced his U-boat to recharge his batteries when a lookout spotted smoke from Pathfinder's funnels on the horizon. U-21 submerged to make an attack, but Pathfinder turned away on her patrol line; U-21 could not hope to keep up with the cruiser while submerged, so Hersing broke off the chase and resumed recharging his batteries. Shortly thereafter, Pathfinder reversed course again and headed back toward U-21. Hersing maneuvered into an attack position and fired a single torpedo, which hit Pathfinder just aft of her conning tower. The torpedo detonated one of the cruiser's magazines, which destroyed the ship in a large explosion. The British were able to lower only a single lifeboat before Pathfinder sank. Other survivors were found clinging to wreckage by torpedo boats that rushed to the scene. Pathfinder was the first warship to be sunk by a modern submarine. A total of 261 sailors were killed in the attack.

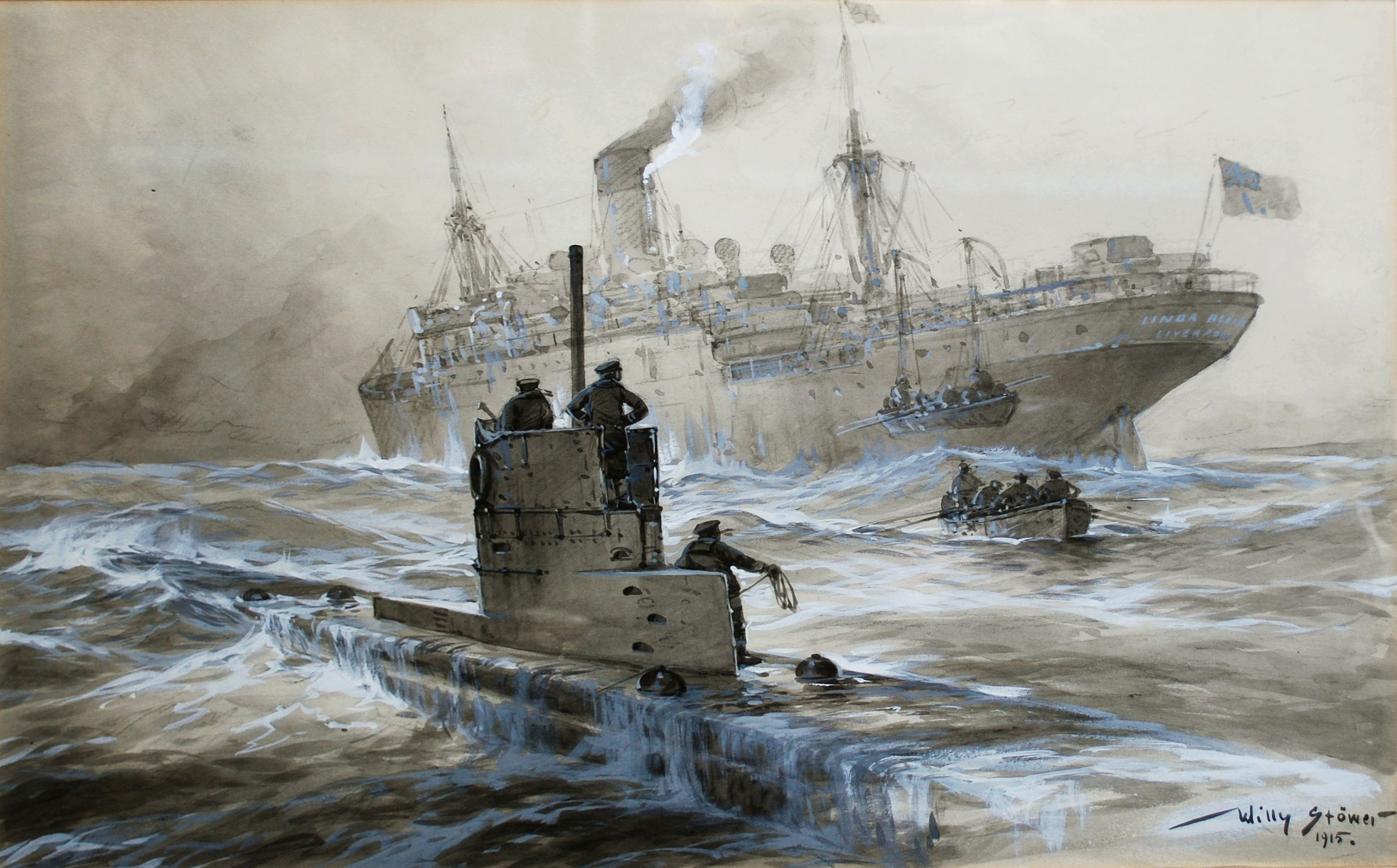
Willy Stöwer's painting of U-21 sinking Linda Blanche

U-21 caught the French steamer SS Malachite on 14 November; Hersing forced the ship to stop and examined her cargo manifest, ordered the crew to abandon ship, then sank Malachite with his deck gun. U-21's next success came three days later with the British collier SS Primo, which he also sank in accordance with the cruiser rules that governed commerce raiding. These two ships were the first vessels to be sunk in the restricted German submarine offensive against British and French merchant shipping.

On 22 January, Hersing took his U-boat through the Dover Barrage in the Channel before turning into the Irish Sea. He shelled the airfield on Walney Island, though a coastal battery quickly forced him to withdraw. The next week, U-21 stopped the collier SS Ben Cruachan; after evacuating her crew, the Germans sank her with scuttling charges. Later that day, 30 January 1915, U-21 stopped and sank the steamers SS Linda Blanche and SS Kilcuan. In both cases, Hersing adhered to the prize rules, including flagging down a passing trawler to pick up the ships' crews. After these successes, U-21 withdrew from the area to avoid the British patrols that would arrive in the aftermath of the sinkings. After passing back through the Dover Barrage, U-21 cruised back to Wilhelmshaven.

=== In the Mediterranean 1915–1917 ===
In April 1915, U-21 was transferred to the Mediterranean Sea to support Germany's ally, Turkey. She left Kiel on 25 April, and the first leg of the voyage, from Germany to Austria-Hungary, took eighteen days. Hersing took his submarine north around Scotland to avoid the Dover patrols, and rendezvoused with the supply ship SS Marzala off Cape Finisterre to refuel. Unfortunately for the Germans, Marzala carried poor quality oil that could not be burned in the boat's diesel engines; U-21 had less than half of her fuel supply remaining, and was only halfway on the voyage to Austria-Hungary. Hersing was forced to run his U-boat on the surface to conserve fuel, which increased the risk of detection by Allied forces. While en route the Germans managed to avoid patrolling British and French torpedo boats and transport ships that might have reported their location.

U-21 finally arrived in Cattaro on 13 May, with only 1.8 t (1.8 long tons) of fuel left in her tanks—she had left Germany with 56 t (55 long tons). She spent a week at the Austro-Hungarian submarine bases at Pola and Cattaro in mid-May, where she was visited by Georg von Trapp, an Austro-Hungarian U-boat commander. Several other German submarines joined U-21 in the following months, after calls for assistance from the Ottoman ground forces on the Gallipoli peninsula, who were taking heavy casualties from the bombardments from Allied warships. These U-boats included U-33, U-34, U-35, and U-39.

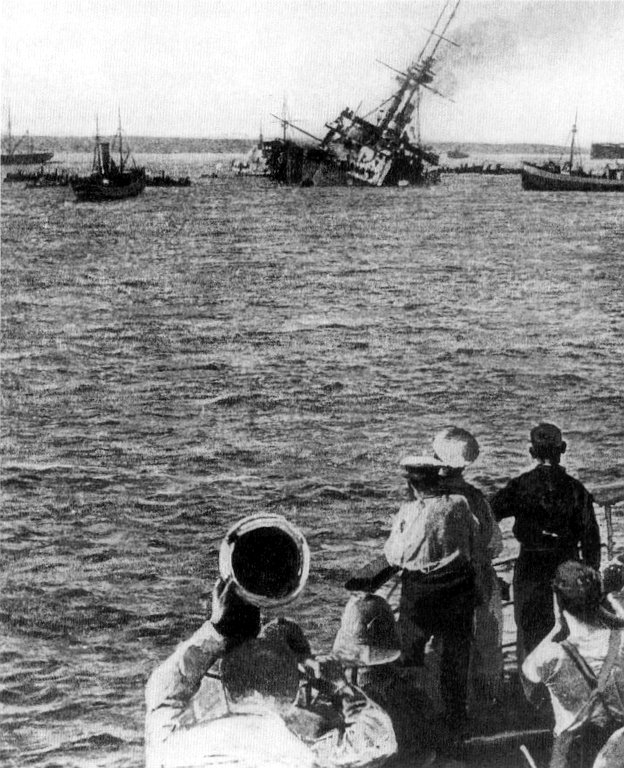
HMS Majestic torpedoed by U-21

U-21 arrived in her operational area off Gallipoli on 25 May; that day, she encountered the British pre-dreadnought battleship HMS Triumph. Hersing brought his U-boat to within 300 yards (270 m) of his target and fired a single torpedo, which hit Triumph. U-21 then dived under the sinking battleship to escape the destroyers hunting her. Hersing took his boat to the sea floor to wait for the Allied forces to abandon the chase. After twenty-eight hours on the bottom, U-21 surfaced to recharge her batteries and bring in fresh air. On 27 May, Hersing attacked and sank his second battleship, HMS Majestic. This time, the British had attempted to protect her with torpedo nets and several small ships, but Hersing was able to aim a torpedo through the defenses. Majestic sank in four minutes. These two successes brought significant dividends: all Allied capital ships were withdrawn to protected anchorages and were thus unable to bombard Ottoman positions on the peninsula. For these two successes, the crew of U-21 was awarded the Iron Cross by Kaiser Wilhelm II, while Hersing himself received the Pour le Mérite, Germany's highest award for valor.

After sinking Majestic, Hersing took his submarine to refuel at a Turkish port before attempting the dangerous route through the Dardanelles to Constantinople. While transiting the straits, U-21 was nearly pulled into a whirlpool but the Germans managed to escape. After arriving in the Ottoman capital, the crew were given a large welcoming ceremony attended by Enver Pasha. U-21 required significant maintenance, and so the crew was given a month of shore leave while the repairs were carried out. Once the repair work was finished, U-21 sortied through the Dardanelles for another patrol. Hersing spotted the Allied munitions ship Carthage, which he sank with a single torpedo. Later on the patrol, a lookout on an Allied trawler spotted U-21's periscope; the Germans had to crash-dive to escape being rammed, but doing so brought them into a minefield. One mine exploded off the U-boat's stern but it caused no significant damage, and U-21 was able to withdraw to Constantinople.

U-21 thereafter moved to the Black Sea where she and UB-14 served as the nucleus of the newly formed Black Sea Flotilla. In September, U-21 undertook another patrol in the eastern Mediterranean. In the meantime, the Allies had established a complete blockade of the Dardanelles with mines and nets to prevent submarines from operating out of Constantinople. Unable to return to Constantinople, Hersing instead took his U-boat back to Cattaro. Germany would not be in a formal state of war with Italy until August 1916. As a result, German U-boats could not legally attack Italian ships, despite the fact that Italy was at war with Austria-Hungary. To circumvent this restriction, German submarines operating in the Mediterranean were commissioned into the Austro-Hungarian Navy, though their German crews remained aboard. Following her arrival in Cattaro, U-21 was commissioned as the Austro-Hungarian U-36. She served under this name until Italy declared war on Germany on 27 August 1916.

In the meantime, U-36 began to have further successes against Allied maritime trade. On 1 February 1916, she sank the British steamer SS Belle of France. A week later, U-36 torpedoed and sank the French armored cruiser Amiral Charner off the Syrian coast. The cruiser sank quickly with heavy loss of life; 427 men went down with their ship. In early 1916, while patrolling off Sicily, U-36 encountered an Allied Q-ship, an auxiliary cruiser disguised as an unarmed merchant ship. U-36 fired a shot across the Q-ship's bow, but it refused to stop and returned fire with a small deck gun. Hersing decided to close and sink the ship, which then revealed her heavy armament. Wounded by shell splinters, Hersing withdrew his submarine under cover of a smoke screen before submerging.

On 30 April, Hersing sank the British steamer City of Lucknow. He sank three small Italian sailing vessels off Corsica between 26 and 28 October, and on 31 October U-21 sent the 5,838 grt steamship Glenlogan to the bottom. Over the next three days, another four Italian ships—the steamships Bernardo Canale and Torero and two small sailing vessels—were sunk off Sicily. On 23 December, U-21 torpedoed the British steamer SS Benalder east of Crete, but the ship managed to reach Alexandria.

=== Return to the North Sea ===
In early 1917, U-21 was recalled to Germany to join the unrestricted submarine warfare campaign being waged against Britain. While en route, she stopped and sank a pair of British sailing vessels off Porto on 16 February and another pair of Portuguese sailing ships the next day. On 20 February, U-21 sank the French steamer Cacique in the Bay of Biscay. Two days later in the Western Approaches, she finished off the Dutch steamer Bandoeng, which had been damaged by the submarine UC-5 on 15 February. Seven more ships followed Bandoeng that day. They included six more Dutch steamers—Eemland, Gaasterland, Jacatra, Noorderdijk, Zaandijk, and Menado—and the Norwegian steamer Normanna. On another patrol in late April, Hersing caught four more ships: the Norwegian Giskö and Theodore William on 22 April and Askepot on 29 April, along with the Russian Borrowdale on 30 April. Another Russian vessel, Lindisfarne, followed on 3 May. The British steamer Adansi and Killarney were sunk on 6 and 8 May, respectively. The Swedish Baltic, which proved to be Hersing's last victory, was sunk on 27 June.

Hersing attacked a convoy of fifteen merchant ships escorted by fourteen destroyers in August south-west of Ireland. He took U-21 between two of the escorting destroyers and briefly used his periscope to gauge the speed and course of the transports before firing two torpedoes and diving. Hersing reported both torpedoes hit and the destroyers immediately rushed to begin their depth charge attacks. After a five-hour hunt, the destroyers withdrew to rejoin the convoy. The experience led Hersing to change tactics in future attacks on escorted convoys; instead of attacking the ships from as far away as possible, he chose to fire his torpedoes at closer range and then dive under the transport ships, where the destroyers would be unable to launch their depth charges for fear of damaging the transports. As of 1918, she was assigned to the III U-boat Flotilla. Later in 1918, the submarine was used as a training boat for new crews. She survived the war, but on 22 February 1919, she accidentally sank in the North Sea while under tow to Britain, where she was to be formally surrendered.

In the course of her commerce raiding, U-21 sank forty ships for a combined 113,580 gross register tons (GRT), and damaged two more for a total of 8,918 gross register tons (GRT). The ships sunk included two battleships and two cruisers.

== Summary of raiding history ==
Date	Name	Nationality	Tonnage (Note: Merchant ship tonnages are in gross register tons. Military vessels are listed by tons displacement.)	Fate
5 September 1914	HMS Pathfinder	Royal Navy	2,940	Sunk
23 November 1914	Malachite	United Kingdom	718	Sunk
26 November 1914	Primo	United Kingdom	1,366	Sunk
30 January 1915	Ben Cruachan	United Kingdom	3,092	Sunk
30 January 1915	Kilcoan	United Kingdom	456	Sunk
30 January 1915	Linda Blanche	United Kingdom	369	Sunk
25 May 1915	HMS Triumph	Royal Navy	11,985	Sunk
27 May 1915	HMS Majestic	Royal Navy	14,900	Sunk
4 July 1915	Carthage	France	5,601	Sunk
1 February 1916	Belle of France	United Kingdom	3,876	Sunk
8 February 1916	Amiral Charner	French Navy	4,750	Sunk
30 April 1916	City of Lucknow	United Kingdom	3,669	Sunk
26 October 1916	Marina G.	Italy	154	Sunk
28 October 1916	Gilda R.	Italy	37	Sunk
28 October 1916	Tre Fratelli D.	Italy	190	Sunk
31 October 1916	Glenlogan	United Kingdom	5,838	Sunk
1 November 1916	Bernardo Canale	Italy	1,346	Sunk
1 November 1916	Torero	Italy	767	Sunk
2 November 1916	San Antonio O.	Italy	113	Sunk
3 November 1916	San Giorgio	Italy	258	Sunk
23 December 1916	Benalder	United Kingdom	3,044	Damaged
16 February 1917	Mayola	United Kingdom	146	Sunk
16 February 1917	Rose Dorothea	United Kingdom	147	Sunk
17 February 1917	Emilia I	Portugal	25	Sunk
17 February 1917	Lima	Portugal	108	Sunk
20 February 1917	Cacique	France	2,917	Sunk
22 February 1917	Bandoeng	Netherlands	5,851	Sunk
22 February 1917	Eemland	Netherlands	3,770	Sunk
22 February 1917	Gaasterland	Netherlands	3,917	Sunk
22 February 1917	Jacatra	Netherlands	5,373	Sunk
22 February 1917	Noorderdijk	Netherlands	7,166	Sunk
22 February 1917	Normanna	Norway	2,900	Sunk
22 February 1917	Zaandijk	Netherlands	4,189	Sunk
22 February 1917	Menado	Netherlands	5,874	Damaged
22 April 1917	Giskö	Norway	1,643	Sunk
22 April 1917	Theodore William	Norway	3,057	Sunk
29 April 1917	Askepot	Norway	1,793	Sunk
30 April 1917	Borrowdale	Russia	1,268	Sunk
3 May 1917	Lindisfarne	Russia	1,703	Sunk
6 May 1917	Adansi	United Kingdom	2,644	Sunk
8 May 1917	Killarney	United Kingdom	1,413	Sunk
27 June 1917	Baltic	Sweden	1,125	Sunk
