= SS Cuxhaven (1882) =

History

United Kingdom
- Name: 1882–1910: Cuxhaven; 1910–1916: Torero
- Operator: 1882–1895: Yorkshire Coal and Steamship Company; 1895–1905: Goole Steam Shipping Company; 1905–1910: Lancashire and Yorkshire Railway; 1910–1912: Giuseppe Sfilio, Catania; 1912–1916: Società Trasporti Internazionali Marittimi (Giacomo Randazzo)
- Builder: William Thompson, Dundee
- Yard number: 40
- Launched: 6 May 1882
- Fate: Sunk 1 November 1916

General characteristics
- Tonnage: 757 gross register tons (GRT)
- Length: 220 feet (67 m)
- Beam: 32 feet (9.8 m)
- Depth: 13.7 feet (4.2 m)

SS Cuxhaven was a cargo ship built for the Yorkshire Coal and Steamship Company in 1882.

== History ==
The ship was built by William Thompson of Dundee, Scotland, for the Yorkshire Coal and Steamship Company and launched on 6 May 1882.

On 20 April 1886 she was in collision with the Manchester Wholesale Co-operative Society steamer Progress, which left a breach in the Cuxhaven's stokehold. Cuxhaven was beached. She was salvaged by the Dundee Salvage Company early in May which required the removal of 300 tons of mud.

Cuxhaven, inwards from Hamburg, was damaged on 18 November 1890 when driven into the cargo steamer Equity in the Goole Channel after her anchor lifted during a heavy swell; she was then beached to avoid sinking. Refloated the following day, she entered Goole for discharge and repairs.

In 1895 Cuxhaven was acquired by the Goole Steam Shipping Company. In 1905 she was acquired by the Lancashire and Yorkshire Railway. She was sold in 1910 to Giuseppe Sfilio, Catania and renamed Torero. In 1912 she was sold to Giacomo Randazzo, Palermo and the following year the firm became the Società Trasporti Internazionali Marittimi. During World War I, she was sunk in the Mediterranean Sea on 1 November 1916 6 nautical miles (11 km) off Capo Gallo, Sicily (38°30′N 13°28′E) by the Imperial German Navy submarine SM U-21. Her crew survived.
