= William P. Frye (barque) =

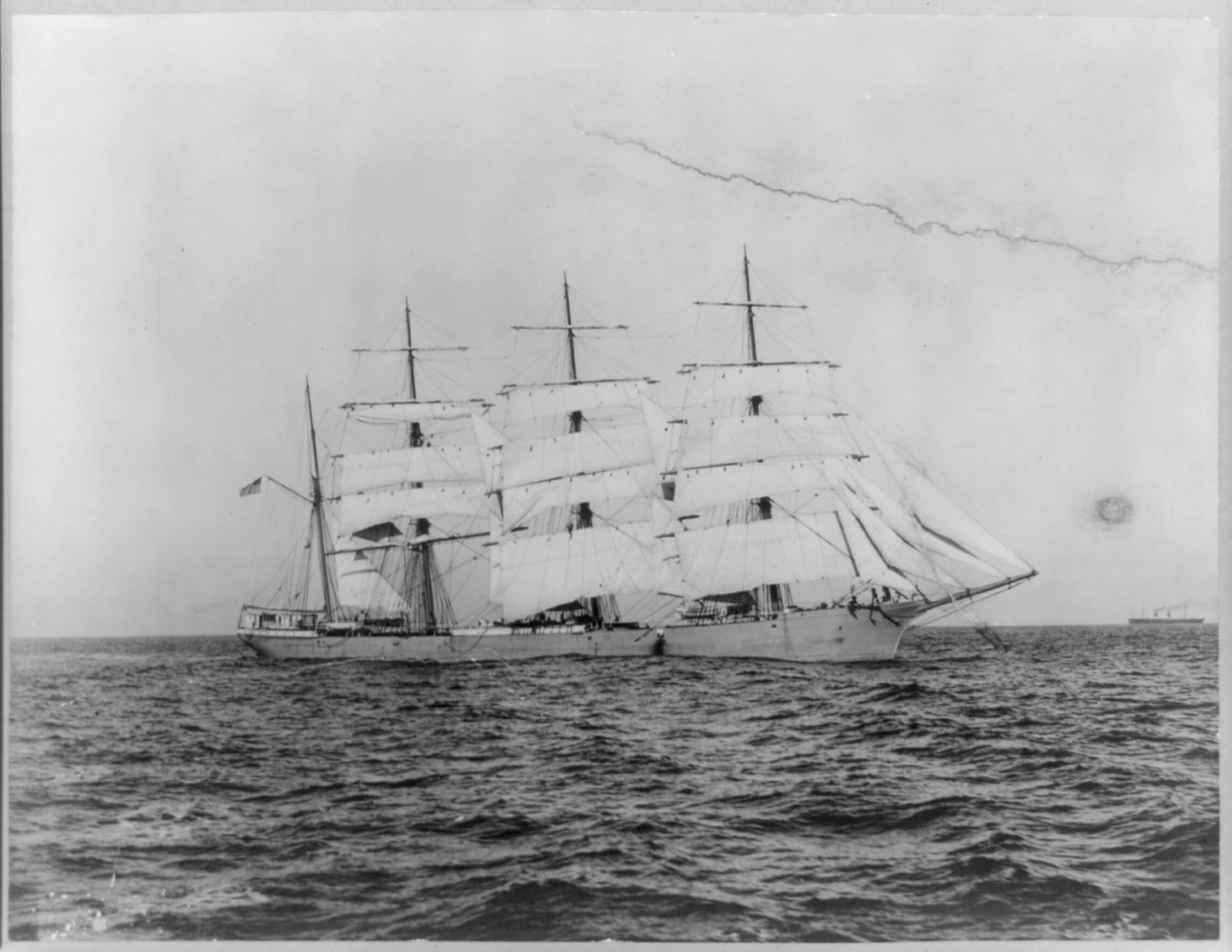
- William P. Frye under sail

History

United States
- Name: William P. Frye
- Namesake: William P. Frye
- Owner: Arthur Sewall & Co.
- Port of registry: Bath, Maine
- Builder: Arthur Sewall & Co
- Completed: 1901
- Identification: US official number 81792; code letters KRGL
- Fate: Scuttled, January 28, 1915

General characteristics
- Tonnage: 3,374 GRT, 2,998 NRT
- Length: 332.4 ft (101.3 m)
- Beam: 45.5 ft (13.9 m)
- Depth: 26.2 ft (8.0 m)
- Sail plan: four-masted barque

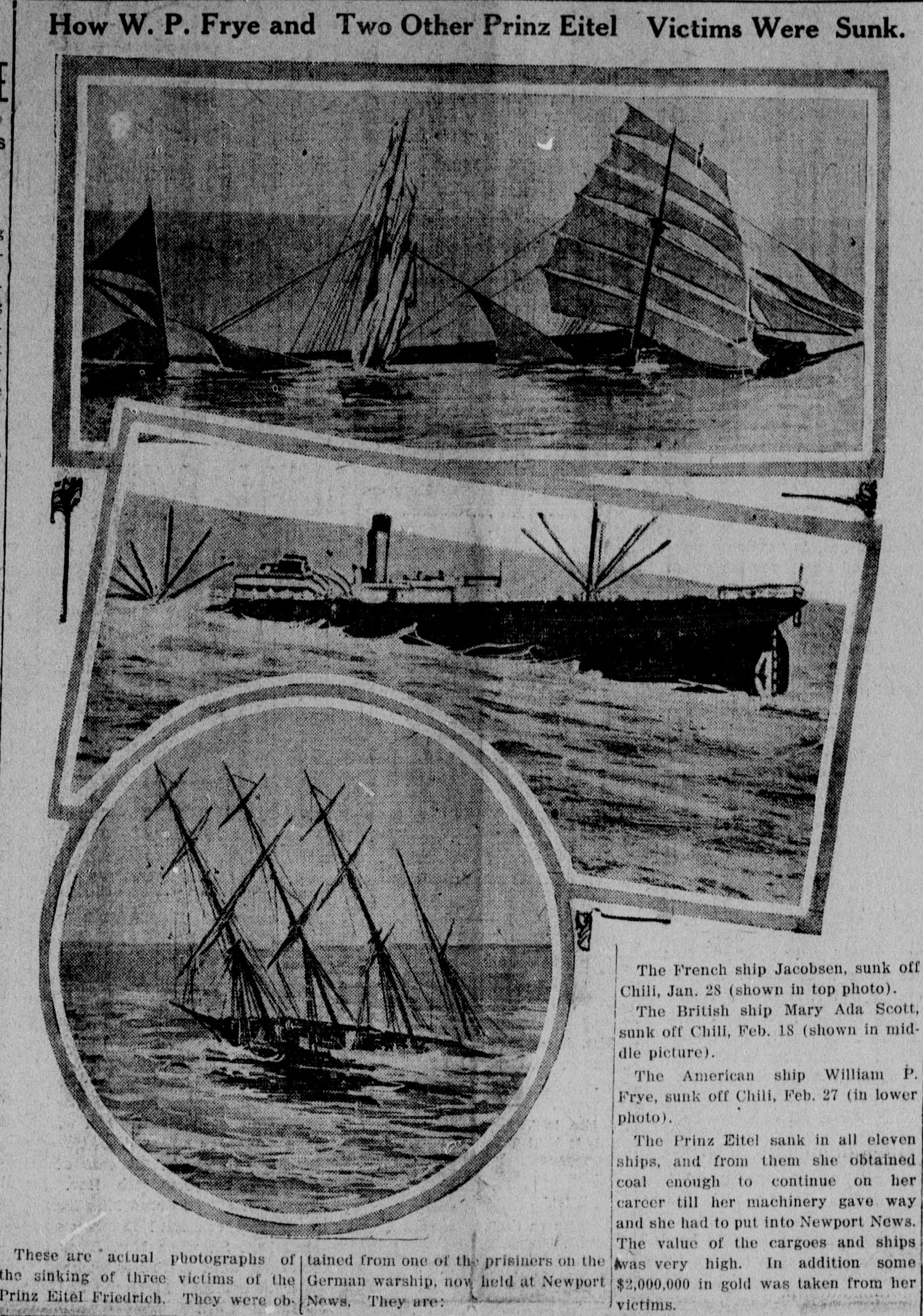
Three ships sunk by Imperial German Naval raider SMS Prinz Eitel Friedrich: French Friedrich Jacobsen (top); British Mary Ada Scott (middle); American William P Frye (bottom)

William P. Frye was a steel-hulled, four-masted barque, named after a US Republican politician William P. Frye, from the state of Maine. Arthur Sewall & Co of Bath, Maine built her in 1901, andoperated her thereafter. The Imperial German Navy merchant raider SMS Prinz Eitel Friedrich sank her in 1915. She was the first US vessel sunk in World War I.

== Building ==
Arthur Sewall & Co built William P. Frye in Bath, ME, in 1901. Her registered length was 332.4 ft (101.3 m), her beam was 45.5 ft (13.9 m), and her depth was 26.2 ft (8.0 m). Her tonnages were 3,374 GRT and 2,998 NRT. She had four masts. She was registered as a full-rigged ship, but photographs show her as a barque. Sewall registered her in Bath. Her US official number was 81792, and her code letters were KRGL.

== Loss ==
The ship sailed from Seattle, Washington, on November 4, 1914, with a cargo of 189,950 US bushels (1,768,300 US gal) of wheat for the United Kingdom. She was to call at Queenstown (now Cobh), Falmouth, or Plymouth, presumably for further orders of where to take her cargo, as she had no wireless.

The UK was at war with Imperial Germany, but the United States was still neutral. On January 27, 1915, off the coast of Brazil, the German merchant raider SMS Prinz Eitel Friedrich stopped William P. Frye and put a boarding party aboard her. While William P. Frye was US-owned and thus a neutral ship, her cargo was deemed contraband, because the Germans believed it was bound for Britain's armed forces. The captain of Prinz Eitel Friedrich, Max Thierichens, ordered that William P. Frye's cargo of wheat be thrown overboard. When his orders were not followed quickly enough, he took the ship's crew and passengers prisoner, and on January 28, 1915 he had her scuttled. William P. Frye was the first US ship sunk in World War I.

== Aftermath ==
The crew and passengers of William P. Frye, including women and children, were among about 350 people taken prisoner from eleven different ships that Prinz Eitel Friedrich had searched and sunk. All 350 were released on March 10, 1915, when she docked in the Us port of Newport News, Virginia, due to engine trouble. An outraged American government forced the Germans to apologize for the sinking. The owners of the ship, Arthur Sewall & Co, sought damages for the sinking of the ship and presented a claim for $228,059.54 ($7,258,100 in 2025).

Claim	Cost in 1915	Cost in 2025
Value of the ship	$150,000	$4,773,800
Value of freight	$39,759.54 (Note: "Actual freight as per freight list, 5034 1000/2240 tons at 32-6-£8180-19-6 at $4.86")	$1,265,400
Travel expenses of Captain Kiehne and Arthur Sewall & Co	$500	$15,900
Personal effects of Captain H. H. Kiehne	$300	$9,500
Damages due to loss of use of the ship	$37,500	$1,193,500
Total	$228,059.54	$7,258,100

== See also ==
- American entry into World War I
- United States in World War I

== Bibliography ==
Notes

References

- Bisher, Jamie (2016). The Intelligence War in Latin America, 1914–1922. McFarland. ISBN 9781476620268.
- Bruzelius, Lars (March 2, 1997). "William P. Frye". bruzelius.info.
- Burlin, Paul T. (2008). Imperial Maine and Hawai'i: Interpretative Essays in the History of Nineteenth Century American Expansion. Lexington Books. ISBN 9780739127186.
- Department of State (June 1915). "Case of the William P. Frye". The American Journal of International Law. 9 (3): 180–193. doi:10.2307/2212245. ISSN 0002-9300. JSTOR 2212245.
- History.com (2017). "Germans sink American merchant ship". History.com.
- Lloyd's Register of Shipping. Vol. I.–Sailing Vessels, Owners, &c. London: Lloyd's Register of Shipping. 1914 – via Internet Archive.
- Skinner, Inc. (2017). "Diorama of the Ship WILLIAM P. FRYE". Skinner, Inc..
