= SS Prinz Eitel Friedrich (1904) =

German passenger liner

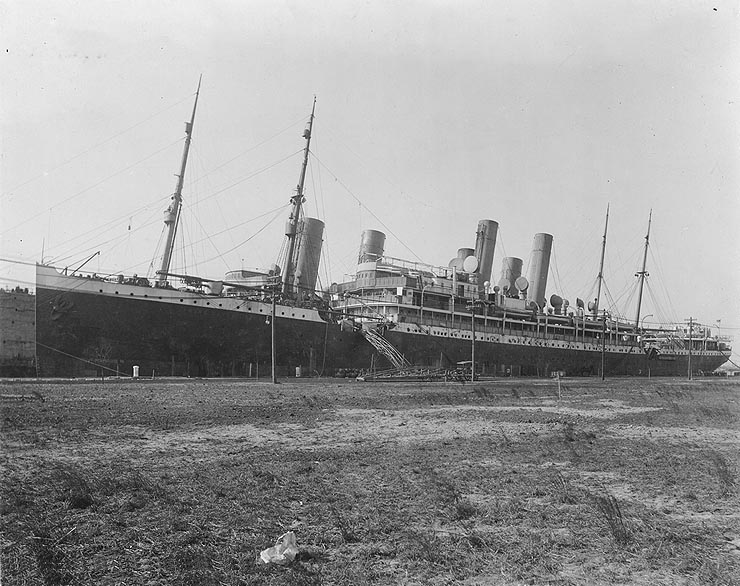
- SS Prinz Eitel Friedrich on 28 March 1917, interned at the Philadelphia Navy Yard, Pennsylvania (Kronprinz Wilhelm is moored behind)

History

German Empire
- Name: Prinz Eitel Friedrich
- Builder: Vulcan. Stettin
- Launched: 1904
- Commissioned: 5 August 1914
- Fate: Interned 1915, seized 1917

General characteristics
- Tonnage: 8,797 GRT
- Displacement: 16,000 tons
- Length: 153.3 m (503 ft)
- Beam: 16.9 m (55 ft)
- Draught: 7.1 m (23 ft)
- Propulsion: 2 × 4 cylinder expansion
- Speed: 15 kn (28 km/h)
- Range: 10,000 nm
- Complement: 402
- Armament: 4 × 10.5 cm SK L/40 naval guns; 6 × 8.8 cm SK L/40 guns; 4 × 3.7 cm quick-firing cannon

SS Prinz Eitel Friedrich was a German passenger liner which saw service in the First World War as an auxiliary cruiser of the Imperial German Navy and named after Prince Eitel Friedrich of Prussia. Though largely overlooked, Prinz Eitel Friedrich was, after SS Kronprinz Wilhelm, the most successful of Germany's first wave of auxiliary cruisers. She was able to remain at large for seven months, from August 1914 to March 1915, and sank 11 ships, for a total tonnage of 33,000 GRT.

== Early career ==
Prinz Eitel Friedrich was built for the Norddeutscher Lloyd, a former shipping company of the Hapag-Lloyd, by the AG Vulcan shipyard in Stettin, in 1904. For the ten years prior to the First World War she served on NDL routes in the Far East. On the eve of war in August 1914 she was at Shanghai, with orders to proceed to the German naval base at Qingdao for conversion as an auxiliary cruiser (Hilfskreuzer).

== Service history ==
At Qingdao Prinz Eitel Friedrich was equipped for her role as a commerce raider, receiving the armaments and crews of the aging gunboats Luchs, and Tiger. KK Max Therichens, of Luchs, took command.

She was commissioned on 5 August 1914 and sailed from Qingdao the same day to join company with Admiral Graf von Spee and the German East Asia Squadron. These were at Pagan in the Caroline Islands, and Prinz Eitel Friedrich arrived there on 12 August.

On 13 August she was detached for independent operations with a remit to attack and destroy allied commerce. She sailed south to start this mission along the coast of Australia.

In the following seven months she operated in the Pacific and South Atlantic, sinking 11 vessels, mostly sailing ships, for a total of 33,423 gross register tons (GRT).

In March 1915, with her bunkers nearly empty and her engines worn out, Prinz Eitel Friedrich headed for the neutral United States, and on 11 March 1915 sailed into Newport News harbour.

== Armament ==
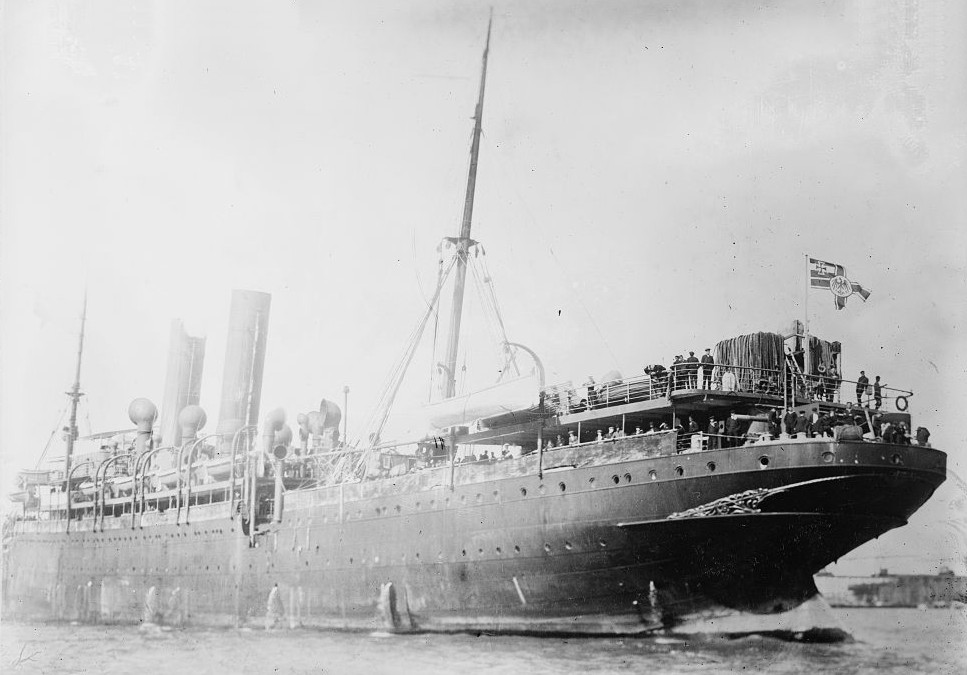
SS Prinz Eitel Friedrich, showing port aft gun mount

Four 10.5 cm SK L/40 cannons. Two each mounted fore and aft. The port aft gun pictured at right.

An original 10.5 cm SK L/40 naval gun from Prinz Eitel Friedrich can be seen at Memorial Park in Cambridge, New York.

== Table ==
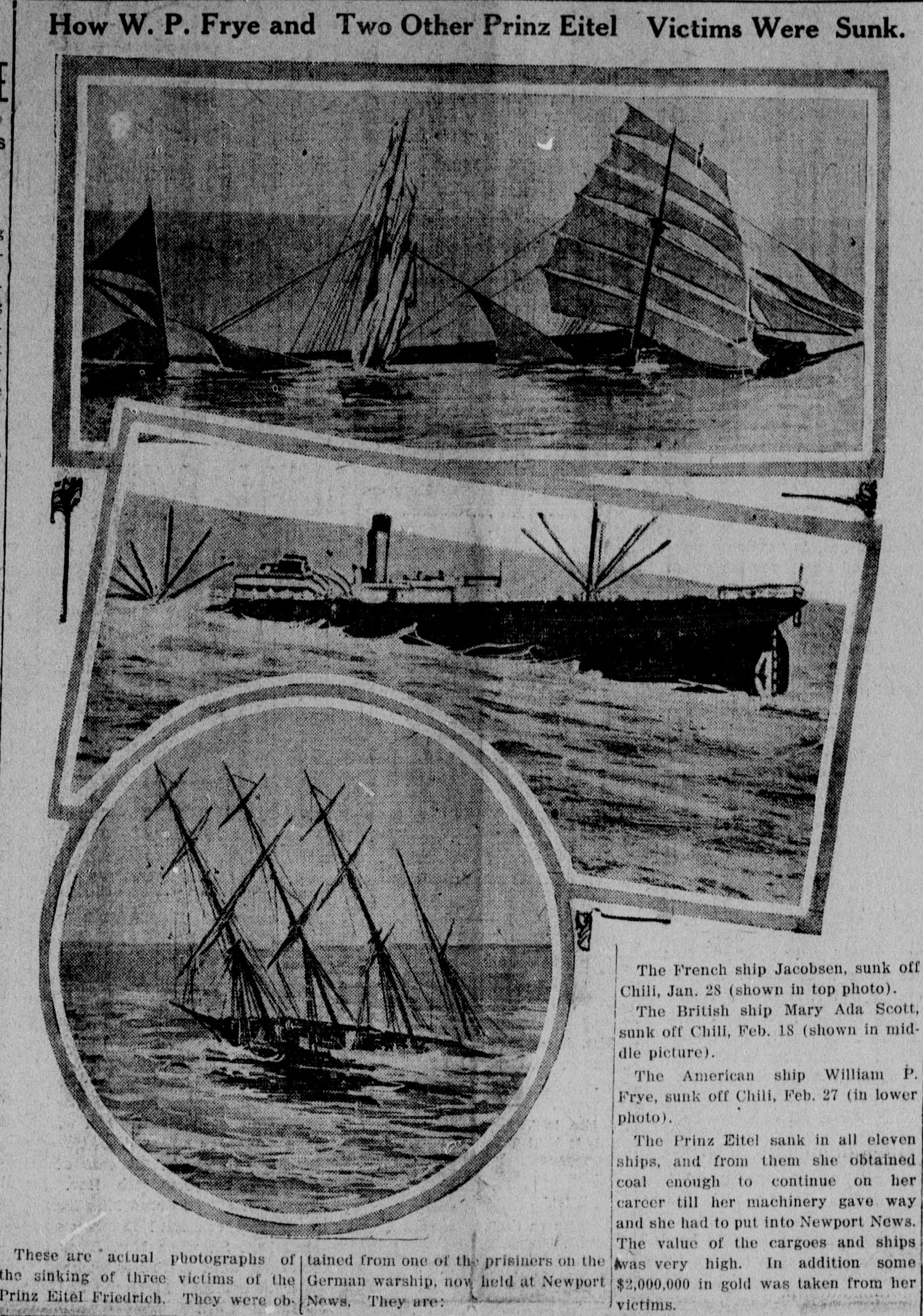
3 ships sunk by Imperial German Naval raider SMS Prinz Eitel Friedrich: French Jacobsen (Top) - British Mary Ada Scott (Middle) - American William P Frye (Bottom)

Date	Ship	Type	Nationality	Tonnage GRT	Fate
5.12.1914	Charcas	Freighter	British	5,067	Sunk
11.12.1914	Jean	Sailing ship	French	2,207	Retained as collier Scuttled 31.12.14
12.12.1914	Kidalton	Sailing ship	British	1,784	Sunk
26.1.1915	Isabel Browne	Sailing ship	Russian	1,315	Sunk
27.1.1915	Pierre Loti	Sailing ship	French	2,196	Sunk
27.1.1915	William P Frye*	Sailing ship	American	3,374	Sunk
28.1.1915	Jacobsen	Sailing ship	French	2,195	Sunk
12.2.1915	Invercoe	Sailing ship	British	1,421	Sunk
18.2.1915	Mary Ada Short	Sailing ship	British	3,605	Sunk
19.2.1915	Floride	Freighter	French	6,629	Sunk
20.2.1915	Willerby	Freighter	British	3,630	Sunk

- William P Frye was the first U.S. ship sunk during World War I. Its sinking contributed to the neutral U.S. entering the war.

== Internment and United States flag ==
Prinz Eitel Friedrich failed to leave the neutral port in the time prescribed by international law and was interned on 9 April 1915. The ship, still under the German flag, was moved to the Philadelphia Navy Yard where, upon the United States declaration of war with Germany on 6 April 1917, she was seized by U.S. Customs officials and then transferred to the Navy.

=== U.S. Naval service ===
Reconditioned and refitted as a troop transport and given the identification number (Id.No.) 3010, she was renamed and commissioned USS DeKalb (ID-3010) at the Philadelphia Navy Yard on 12 May 1917. DeKalb served for the remainder of the war as a troopship on the trans Atlantic route.

=== Immigrant ship ===
The ship was acquired by W. Averell Harriman and included with ten previous ships acquired from the Kerr Navigation Company in a name change so that all were prefixed with an American mountain and thus renamed Mount Clay. The ship was specially modified to be a steerage only immigrant ship for the United American Line of New York. Mount Clay made the initial voyage as an immigrant ship on Christmas Day 1920 (Marine Review) or 26 December (DANFS).

Mount Clay made the last westbound voyage from Hamburg to New York on 15 October 1925 and was laid up until scrapped in 1934.
