= SMS Kronprinz Wilhelm =

Two ships of the Kaiserliche Marine were named Kronprinz Wilhelm:

- SMS Kronprinz Wilhelm (1914), an auxiliary cruiser
- SMS Kronprinz Wilhelm (1918), a battleship launched in 1914 and originally named SMS Kronprinz renamed in 1918
