= Skinner, Inc. =

American auction house

- Logo used until 2022
- Type: Private
- Industry: Auctions, Valuations
- Founded: 1971; 55 years ago Bolton, Massachusetts, U.S.
- Founder: Robert W. Skinner, Jr.
- Defunct: 2022
- Fate: Merged with Bonhams
- Successor: Bonhams Skinner
- Website: skinnerinc.com

Skinner (colloquially Skinner Auctioneers and Appraisers) was an American auction house headquartered in Marlborough, Massachusetts. It has been among the world's leading auction houses for antiques and fine art.

In 2022, Skinner was acquired by Bonhams and is currently doing business as Bonhams Skinner.

== History ==
Skinner was founded by dealer Robert W. Skinner Jr. (1932-1984), who believed that New England, with its long history as an international arts center, was a fitting location for a world-class auction house. The company began operations in the 1960s and was incorporated in 1971 in Bolton, Massachusetts. Skinner's Boston gallery opened in 1978. The company has seen steady growth, and in 2009, Skinner moved its headquarters to nearby Marlborough.

In March 2022, Skinner was acquired by the international auction house Bonhams for an undisclosed sum, and the entity now operates as Bonhams Skinner. The acquisition was part of Bonhams' strategy to expand its presence in the North American market and enhance its digital capabilities. Existing management, including CEO Karen Keane and Stephen Fletcher, remained in leadership roles as part of the transition, and the company continues to conduct auctions across numerous specialist categories from its Massachusetts locations.

== Expert departments ==
Skinner's appraisers regularly appear on the PBS-TV series, Antiques Roadshow, and other arts and culture programs. Representing 20 specialty collecting areas, the appraisers are expert in the areas of American furniture & decorative arts, American & European paintings & prints, European furniture & decorative arts, fine ceramics, fine jewelry, 20th Century design, fine musical instruments, Asian Works of Art, Fine Judaica, Science, Technology & Clocks, Rare Books & Manuscripts, Fine Silver, Antique Motor Vehicles, American Indian & Ethnographic Art, Fine Wines, Oriental rugs & carpets, Textiles & Couture, Toys, Dolls & Collectibles, and Discovery.

== Notable auctions ==
Skinner conducts more than 60 auctions and events each year and has achieved world-record prices for many pieces sold at auction. Fitz Henry Lane’s Manchester Harbor, a 24x36 inch oil painting, sold for $5.5 million in November 2004, a world record for the artist and the highest price ever at auction in New England.

- A rare and historically important previously undiscovered broadside copy of the United States Declaration of Independence sold in 2007 for $693,500. Another broadside copy printed in Exeter, New Hampshire in 1776 by Robert Luist Fowle sold for $380,000 on November 14, 2010.
- A molded copper touring car with driver weather vane, made in Boston circa 1910, sold for $941,000
- 1958/63 Gibson Explorer Electric Guitar sold for $611,000 setting a world record price for a Gibson Guitar.
- In 2011, the sale of the folk art "Portrait of Abigail Rose" achieved $1.27 million, establishing a world record for an American folk art portrait.
- In September 2014, Skinner set a U.S. record for Chinese art by auctioning a monumental Imperial Qing dynasty fencai vase for $24.7 million, which at the time was the highest price ever achieved by a Chinese artwork at auction in the United States, and the largest price realized for any lot at auction in New England.
