= Mahinland =

Area near Lagos, Nigeria

Location of Mahin in Nigeria

Mahinland (sometimes known as the Mahin area) was a piece of land in the coast east of Lagos on the Bight of Benin in modern Nigeria. In the late 19th century it was briefly the object of German colonial initiatives.

== German interests in Mahinland ==
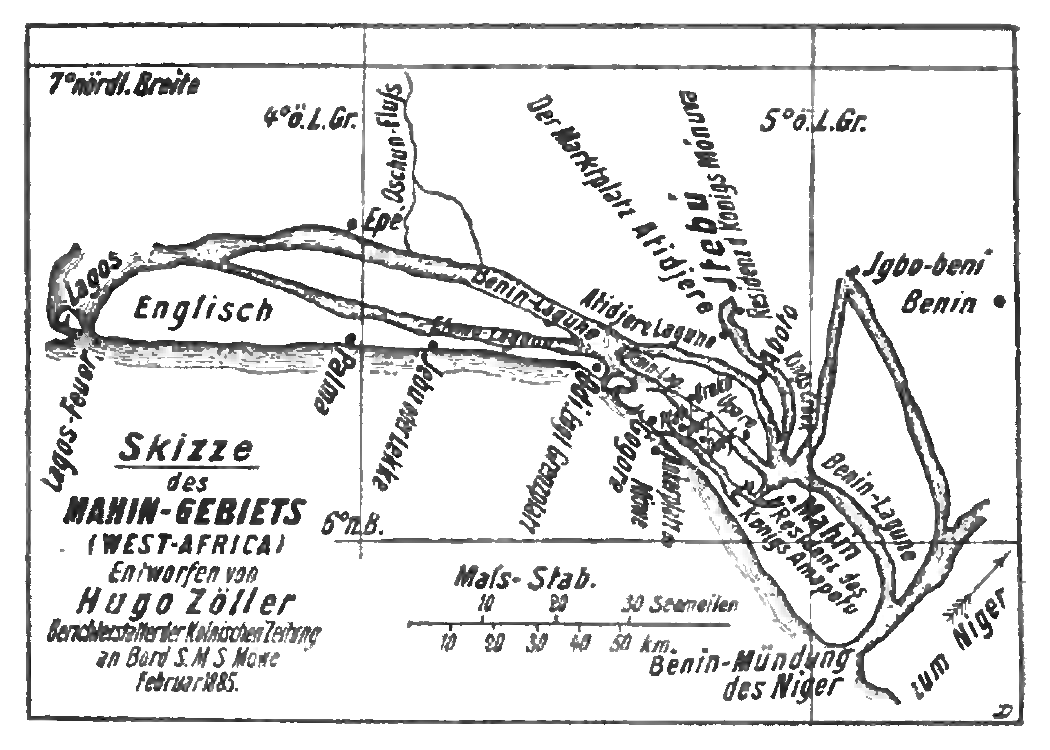
Mahin on a map by Hugo Zöller (1885)

The Hamburg businessman Gottlieb Leonhard Gaiser had a trading post in the British colony of Lagos and wanted to extend its interests in palm oil to the east along the coast and into the interior. He therefore hired a number of agents, including the explorer Gottlob Krause to conduct negotiations with local rulers. From May 1884 Krause and Heinrich Bey, who was both German consul and agent for G. L. Gaiser, opened friendly discussions with the rulers of Mahin and a trading post was opened in Akpata.

On 23 August 1884 Bey met Gustav Nachtigal, the Imperial Commissioner for German West Africa in Lagos and tried to convert these friendly agreements into sovereign treaties. On 15 December 1884 Bey moved the firm's steamer Tender into the Artijere lagoon where it remained as a hulk.

On 14 January 1885 one of Gaiser's agents, Zimmer, asked Gustav Nachtigal, then in Kamerun, to assure German protection for their property. German traders supported this request as they wanted to ensure their goods could reach the upper Niger region free of the duties applied by the British in the areas they controlled. Since 1882 the coast between Lagos and Cameroon had fallen under the jurisdiction of the British consul in Calabar, although it was too large for Britain to be able to exercise effective control over it. On 18 January 1885 another of Gaiser's agents, Eugen Fischer reached a private agreement with the Amapetu (king) of Mahin, granting sovereign rights to G. L. Gaiser over fifty miles of coastal land to the east of Lagos. On 20 January 1885 Nachtigal steamed from Victoria (today Limbe, Cameroon) to Gogoro in the western Niger with the gunboat SMS Möwe and the Gaiser, accompanied by the explorer and journalist Hugo Zöller.

With Zöller accompanying them, Gustav Nachtigal and Eugen Fischer concluded a treaty of protection over Mahinland with the Amapetu on 29 January 1885 (some sources say 25 January). According to German sources the treaty covered lagoon, forest and swamp areas with stilt dwellings, in which 8–10,000 people lived. The village of Mahin, where the Amapetu lived, was sprawling and prosperous although the other settlements were less significant. These included Gogoro in the coast, and Aboto (or Agboto), where the most important subchiefs lived. in return for ceding his land the Amapetu was given silk, liquor, 20 pounds sterling and a Reichsadler inscribed with the words King of Mahin.

== British response and final agreement ==
The British authorities in Lagos recognised the German agreements and the British governor was ready to enter into bilateral negotiations. On 11 March 1885 Nachtigal confirmed that the German protectorate extended over the “stretch of coast in Mahinland known as Mahin beach” from Abejamura to Abotobo. The protectorate was conditional on ratification by the German government within 18 months.

Chancellor Otto von Bismarck regarded territories such as Mahinland and Santa Lucia Bay, which he did not even bother to take under formal protection, as useful bargaining chips in his negotiations with the British; he did not see colonies as valuable in themselves. He therefore instructed Nachtigal to avoid “any further steps with regard to Mahin.” During the negotiations leading to the Anglo-German agreement of 29 April 1885 Mahinland was traded for British recognition of the German protectorate over Cameroon. Germany undertook not to establish any protectorates between Lagos in the west and Rio del Rey in the east, while Britain had already guaranteed the free navigation of the Niger at the Berlin Conference. On 24 October 1885 Mahinland was formally handed over to the British. Gaiser received no compensation as trade was unimpeded.

== Mahin today ==
Today Mahin lies in the Nigerian state of Ondo.

== See also ==
- Kapitaï and Koba (West African coastal areas also briefly claimed by Germany)
