= Braugold =

Coordinates: 50.9689°N 11.0344°E

Braugold Vertriebs GmbH & Co. KG was a prominent brewery located in Erfurt, a city in central Germany. The brewery was one of the largest in the state and, for a period, held the position of market leader in Thuringia, a federal state known for its rich brewing tradition.

== History ==
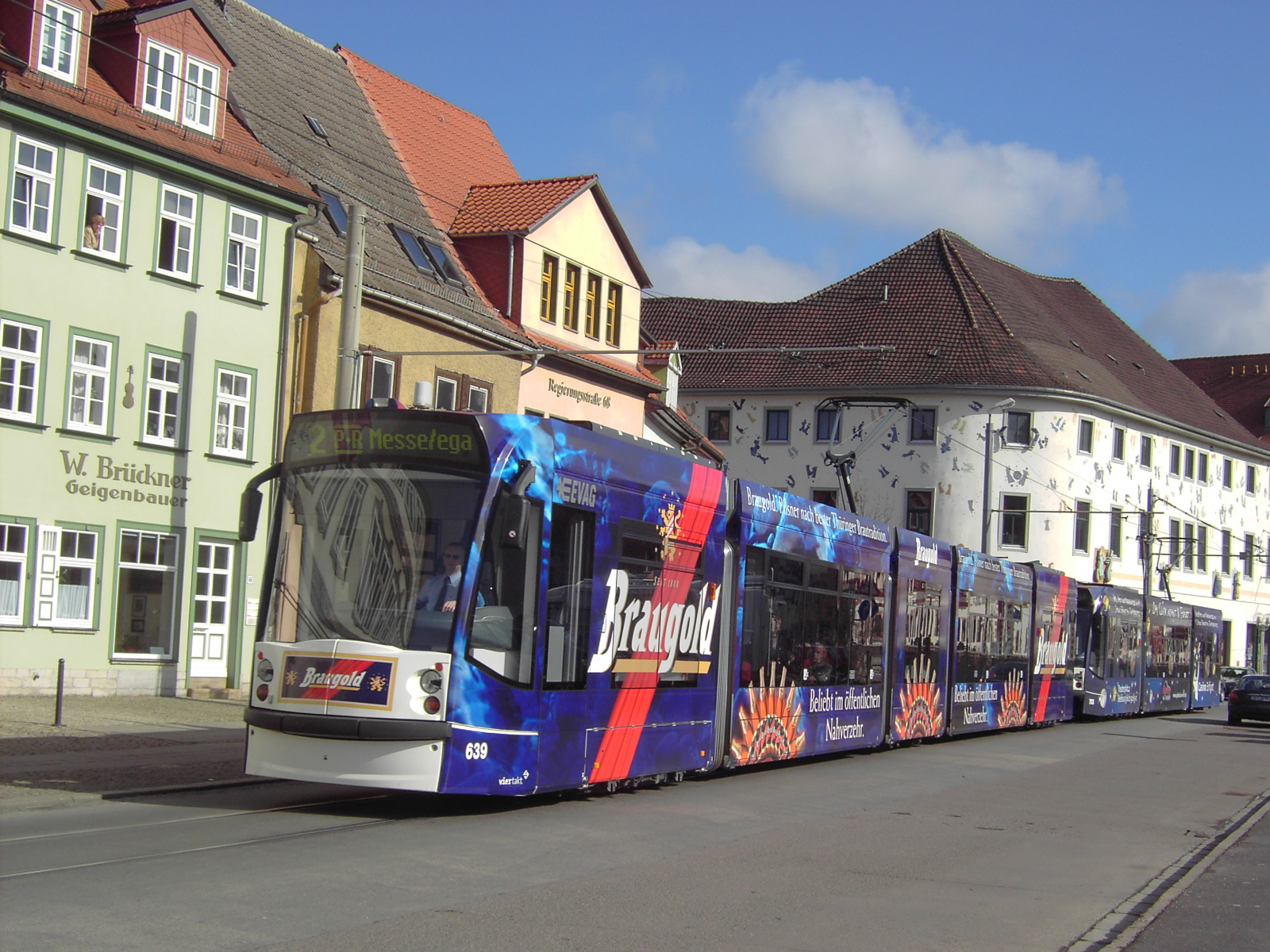
Trolley with Braugold advertising in Erfurt

The history of Braugold Brewery goes back to two breweries formed in the 19th century. Originally, two farm breweries were bought on the downtown street Große Arche in the years 1822 and 1827 by Volkmar Döppleb. These were middle-class houses with the right to brew beer on their agricultural land. The consolidated brewery later went to a Baumann family, which also bought the brewery Schedel in 1848. The second line was founded by Christian Buchner in 1823 by buying the brewery Lauenburg. Under his leadership, the brewery moved in 1888 to its new location in Löbervorstadt near Erfurt's city parks.

In 1920 the brewery acquired Baumann Buchner AG. At the same time the brewery merged with Leipzig Riebeck Brauerei AG, founded by Carl Adolf Riebeck. In 1921 the reorganized brewery produced 2.5 million gallons of beer.

After the end of World War II, the brewery was transferred to public ownership in 1948. With the entry of the trademark Braugold the brewery in 1956 received its current name. In 1967, the production of today's best-selling beer brewing Pilsner special gold began. 1969 was formed by the merger of nine breweries in the district of Erfurt VEB Kombinat drinks Erfurt. The Braugold brewery was the parent company and seat of the line of the combine.

After the turn and the associated end of the beverages combine the Braugold brewery was first adopted by the Lich private brewery in 1990. In 1996 it was taken over by the successor to the former owner, the Riebeck group, which included at that time the brewery in Eisenach and the Wernesgrüner brewery. On 1 January 2011 took over the beverage group Forest Hoff Braugold Brewery.

In the fall of 2010, production in the Erfurt was halted for all seven types of beer, as the largely run-down brewery building did not allow for economical production. The actual brewing and bottling is now done in a brewery in Braunschweig.

== Links ==
- Homepage der Brauerei
- Historische Bieretiketten der Brauerei
