= German West Africa =

Former colony of the German Empire

German West Africa Deutsch-Westafrika
- 1884–1919
- Service flag of the Colonial Office Coat of arms of the German Empire

- German colonies in Africa in 1913
- Status: German colony
- Religion: Christianity; Indigenous beliefs
- Historical era: Scramble for Africa
  - Established: 1884
  - Treaty of Versailles: 28 June 1919

Area
- 1912 (Including Togo): 879,510 km^{2} (339,580 sq mi)

Population
  - 1912 (Including Togo): 5,645,000

German West Africa (Deutsch-Westafrika) was an informal designation for the areas in West Africa that were part of the German colonial empire between 1884 and 1919. The term was normally used for the territories of Cameroon and Togo. German West Africa was not an administrative unit. However, in trade and in the vernacular the term was sometimes in use.

== German interests in West Africa before 1884 ==
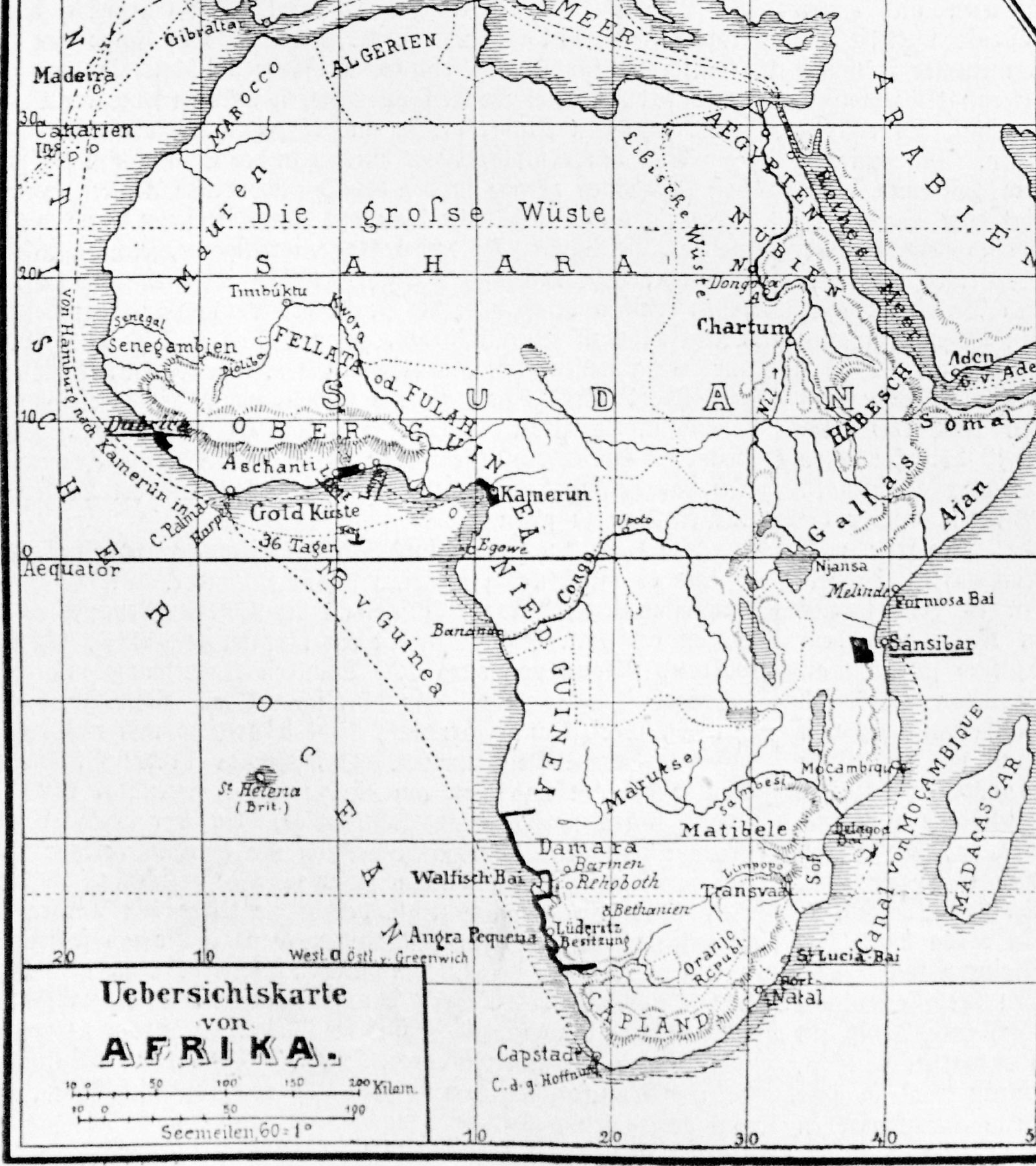
1885 map showing German interests in West Africa (Kapitaï and Koba appear as 'Dubrica')

German interest in West Africa dated from the 17th and 18th centuries, when the Duchy of Courland and Brandenburg-Prussia established fortifications and trading posts in the region. But after 1720, the Germans had no presence in West Africa until the middle of the 19th century, when German trading companies, including C. Woermann, Jantzen & Thormählen, Wölber & Brohm and GL Gaiser, became active on the West African coast. German missionaries, such as the North German Missionary Society, also became active there from the mid-19th century.

By the early 1880s, German interests in West Africa consisted of:

- trading posts in modern Guinea at Kapitaï and Koba, operated by Friedrich Colin
- trading posts in modern Togo at Baguida and Little Popo, dating from 1857
- trading posts and agreements with rulers of coastal villages in modern Cameroon, including Bimbia, Malimba, Batanga, and Kribi. There were German trading posts and agreements in the land of the Duala people, at Akwa-Town, Bell-Town and Dido-Town, which also had similar arrangements with British and other European traders.

The Anglo-French Convention of 1882 led to concerns among Hamburg merchants that their interests would be threatened, and they began to seek the protection of the German Empire for their activities. At the same time as established German commercial interests in West Africa were seeking government and naval support, the broader social movement in favour of colonisation was gaining ground. The German Colonial Society (“Deutscher Kolonialverein”) was founded on December 6, 1882, in Frankfurt am Main with Hermann, Prince of Hohenlohe-Langenburg as its first president; it soon had about 15,000 members.

== Imperial Commissioner for West Africa ==
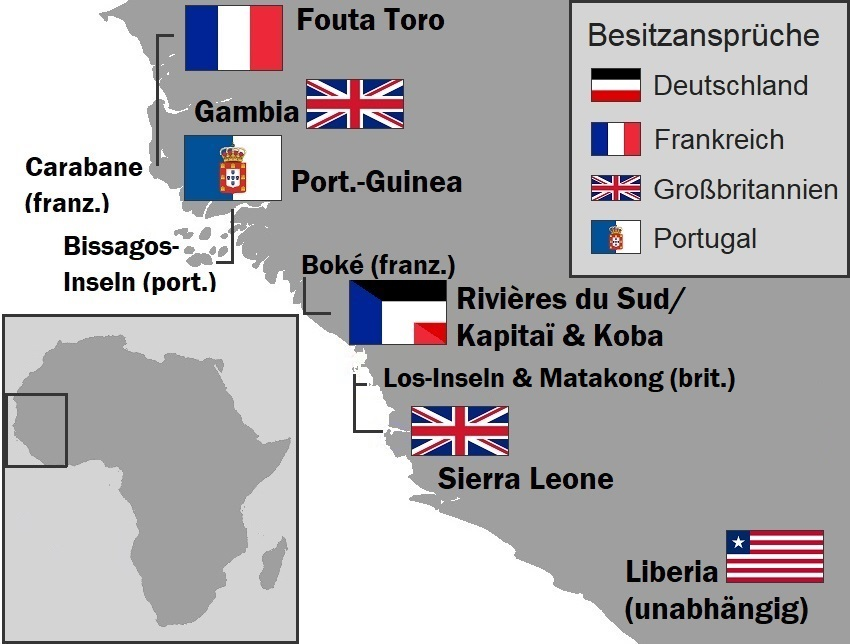
European claims in West Africa 1885: Rivières du Sud and Kapitaï & Koba were disputed between Germany and France.

Chancellor Otto von Bismarck asked for views on potential German intervention in West Africa from the senates of Lübeck, Hamburg and Bremen. In response, Woermann submitted to the Chancellor plans for the establishment of a German-West African trade colony in 1883, which Bismarck initially received with some reservations. In December 1883 the government undertook to take action to protect German traders by sending an Imperial Commissioner for West Africa to enter into formal treaties with local rulers.

On February 3rd 1884, 100 German marines sailed to Aného, a prominent coastal city of Togo, where they kidnapped royals and killed one of their men before boarding the Imperial Corvette SMS Sophie, a German warship led by Captain Wilhelm Stubenrauch. These 5 men were the chiefs of Aného: King G.A Lawson III, William Tevi George Lawson, both royals of Aného, as well as Robert Leandro Gomez, the son of the biggest Slave coast merchant, and, Albert Adjétégan Wilson, currently the counsellor of the prime minister. The Aného royals were forcibly sailed to Germany to meet with the Kaiser to negotiate the surrender of their homeland and people. The Lawson clan had been resisting trade laws imposed by German firms who raised complaints to the Hamburg Chamber of Commerce, which, as a consequence, sent German soldiers to use any necessary violence to get the Lawson clan to comply and handover Aného, a clan always known for resisting colonial influences. This event paved the way for Germany to start its colonial progress across Togo to create German Togoland.

In May 1884, Bismarck decided to appoint Gustav Nachtigal as Imperial Commissioner. His mission was to sail the Atlantic coast of the continent, to explore and test the existing German claims in the region, and where possible to establish new ones. Bismarck's plan was to use Nachitigal's treaties to establish German sovereignty over key areas in West Africa, which would then be governed indirectly, with administration undertaken mainly by a commercial company.

In June 1884, Nachtigal reached Sangareya bay and the Los islands aboard the gunboat Möwe. He sent a party ashore to seek treaties with the rulers of Kapitaï and Koba, but by the time he arrived the local chiefs had already reached agreements with France, and did not want to sign any new treaties. Nachtigal therefore steamed on to the German trading posts on the Bight of Benin.

On 5 July 1884, Nachtigal signed a treaty with Mlapa III, ruler of Togo (a village known today as Togoville) establishing a German protectorate over a stretch of coastal territory. This formed the basis of the future German colony of Togoland. On 14 July 1884, Nachtigal raised the German flag in Bell town and signed treaties placing under German protection the areas which became the colony of Kamerun. He spent some weeks visiting various ports around the Bight of Biafra before sailing south to Gabon, Angola and South West Africa. He steamed back to Kamerun in December 1884 and the Niger Delta in January 1885. On 29 January 1885 he signed a treaty which brought Mahinland under German protection. After this Nachtigal began his return journey to Germany but caught malaria and died off the coast of Guinea in April.

== West African squadron, 1884–1885 ==
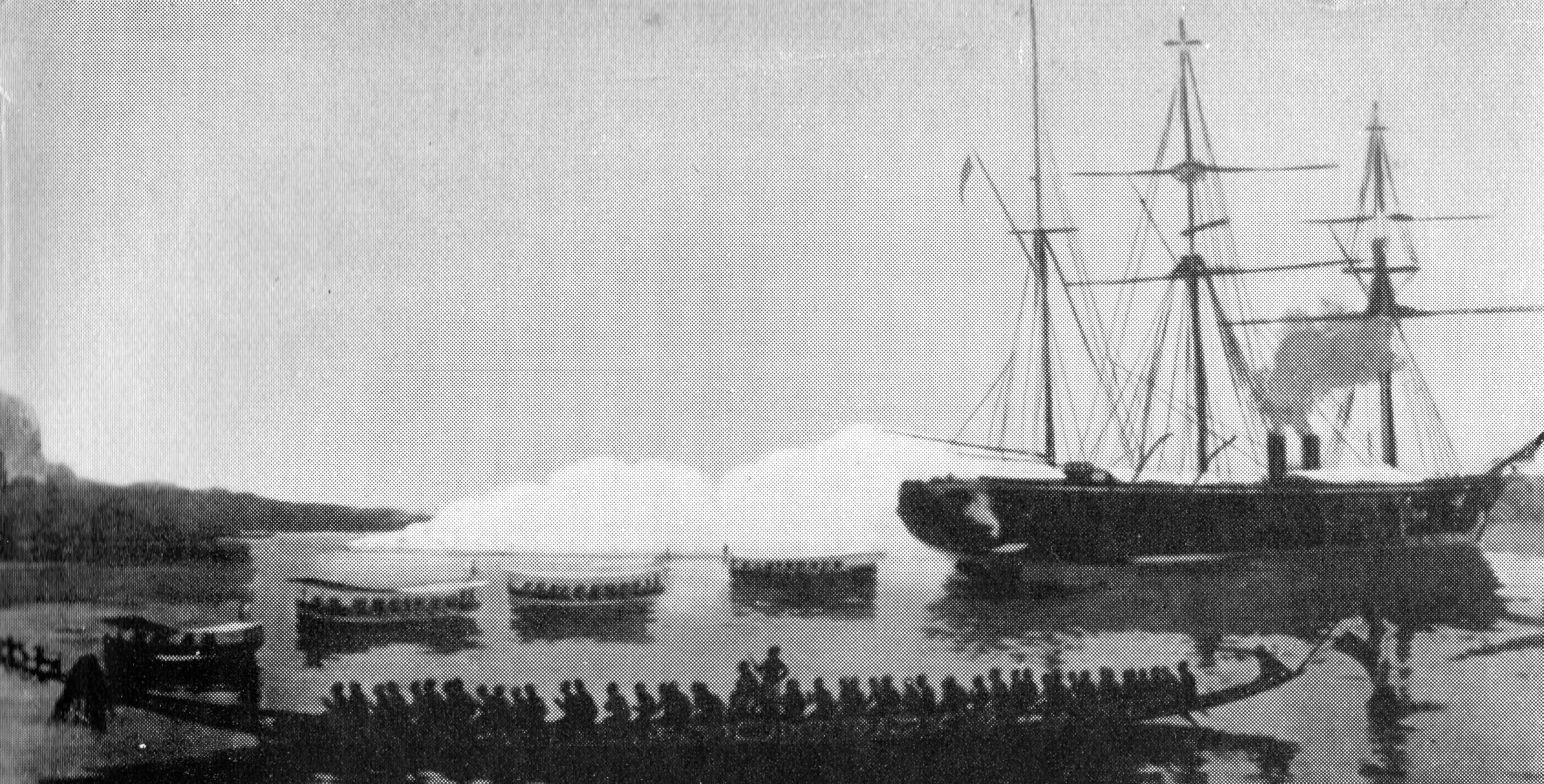
SMS Olga at the bombardment of Hickorytown (Douala), 21 December 1884

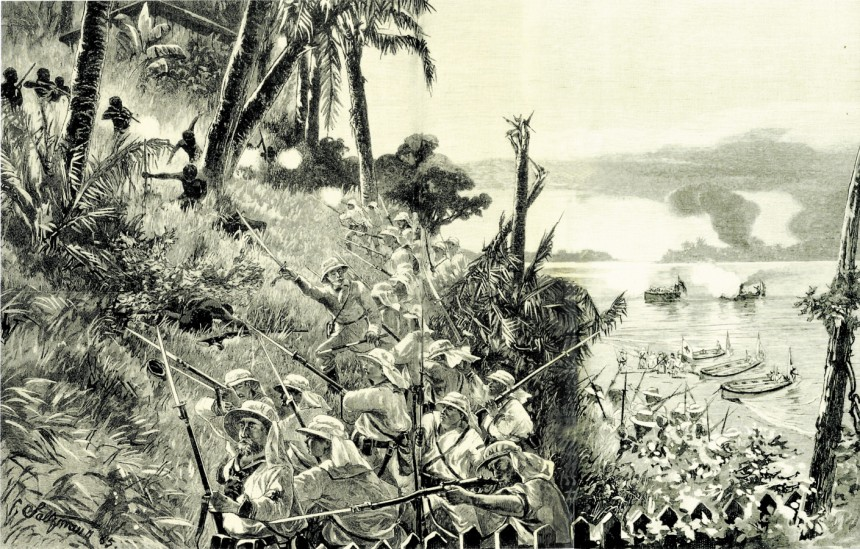
The storming of Belltown by a landing party from SMS Olga, December 1884 (depiction by Carl Saltzmann, 1885)

After Nachtigal had completed his mission of establishing German rights in West Africa, there was a need for naval support to reinforce them. On September 30, 1884, Emperor Wilhelm I issued an order establishing a West African squadron under the command of the Chief of the Staff of the Admiralty, Rear Admiral Eduard von Knorr. The squadron was composed of the corvettes SMS Bismarck (flagship), SMS Gneisenau, SMS Ariadne, SMS Olga and the steam tender Adler. The squadron departed for West Africa on 30 October. On reaching the Cape Verde Islands, it dispatched the Ariadne to Liberia and the Guinea coast and the Gneisenau was sent to East Africa. On December 18, the Bismarck and the Olga reached the Cameroon River.

Shortly before the squadron arrived, the settlement of chief Manga Ndumbe Bell, who had signed a treaty with Nachtigal, had been burned down and the German flag removed. Admiral Knorr decided on immediate intervention and sent landing parties ashore to destroy the villages of the rebels and arrest their chiefs. Two coastal steamers, the Fan and the Dualla were used as landing craft to bring 307 soldiers ashore at Hickorytown on 20 December. The landing party received word that rioters on the opposite bank had attacked the Jantzen & Thormählen factories and carried off their managers, and they stormed Joss town to try and recover them. The next day the Olga steamed upriver on the rising tide and bombarded the local villages. The landing party returned to their ships on 22 December. The Olga, with Rear Admiral Knorr on board, remained in the area where the anti-German uprising had taken place. Calm was gradually restored; in January 1885 the violence ended and in March the murderer of the factory manager was handed over for execution.

On 23 March 1885, the gunboat SMS Habicht arrived to replace the Olga at its permanent station in the river, allowing the Olga to return home together with the Adler. Meanwhile, the Bismarck cruised up and down the coast, hoisting the German flag in a number of places. Following the arrival of the first Imperial Governor of Kamerun, Julius von Soden on 7 July 1885, the Bismarck received orders to sail for East Africa while the gunboat Cyclop took up its position as the second gunboat on the West Africa station. After pacification of tribal feuds and unrest in the area under German protection, the West African Squadron was dissolved in July 1885.

However, in September 1885 Captain Karl Paschen was commanded to re-form the squadron with SMS Stosch, SMS Prinz Adalbert and SMS Gneisenau, deployed under Rear Admiral Knorr in East Africa, and return to the coast of West Africa. In the event, the multiple demand on Germany's small force of gunboats meant that on reaching Cape Town, the Gneisenau was ordered back to East Africa, leaving only the Prince Adalbert and the Stosch to continue to West Africa before proceeding back to Germany, and the West African squadron was dissolved in December 1885. After this the Imperial German Navy established the West African Station, covering the maritime area off the coast of West Africa. Warships were assigned to the ports of the new German colonies.

== West Africa Conference and territorial adjustments ==
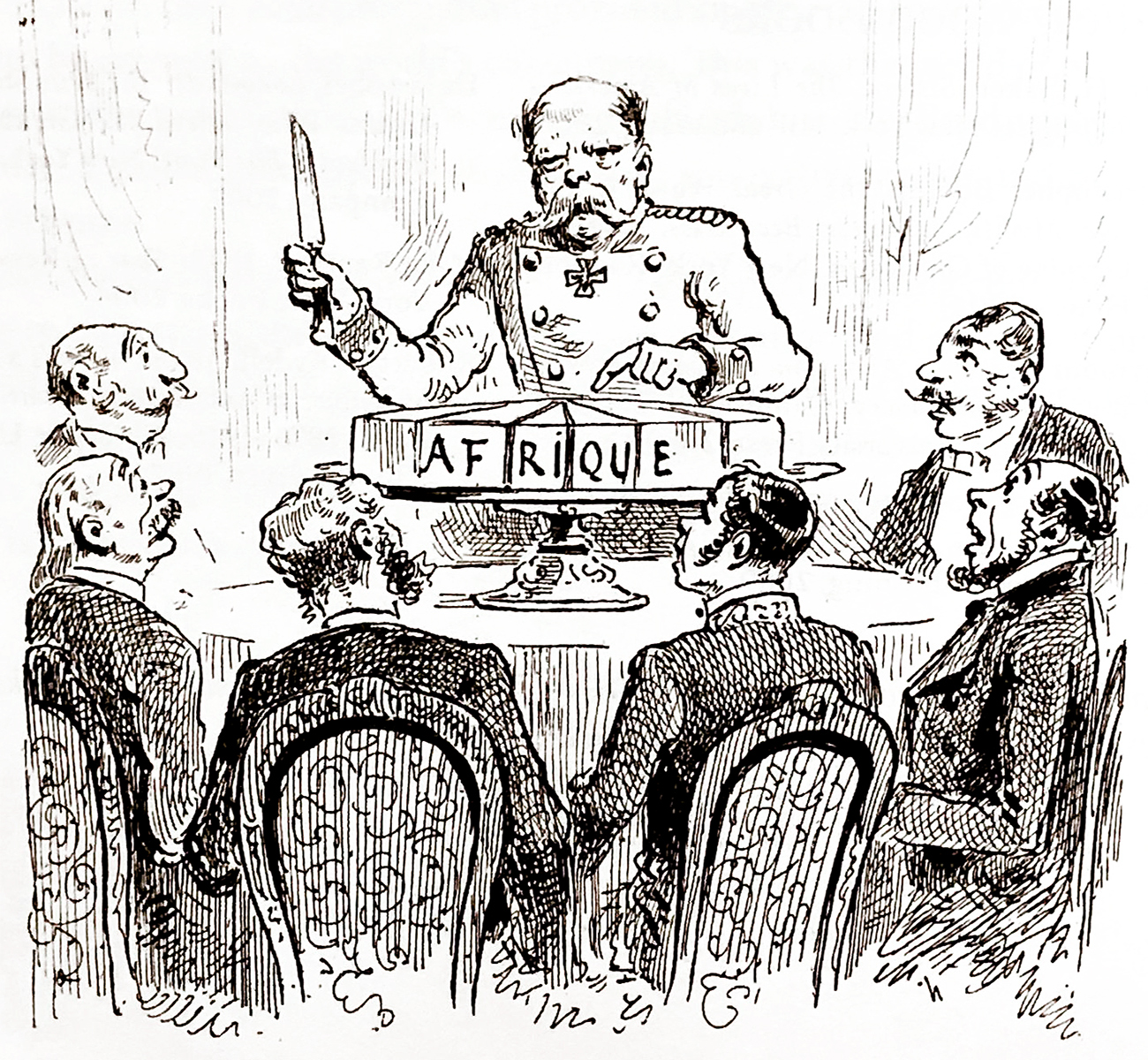
Cartoon of Bismarck dividing Africa at the Berlin Conference, 1885

Having staked its claims with Nachtigal and backed them up with naval force by dispatching the West Africa Squadron, Germany needed to secure international recognition of its position in the region. Bismarck believed that the acquisition of colonies, while expensive and of no real economic or military interest, was beneficial in terms of gaining bargaining power with other governments. His foreign policy goal was to secure an international agreement that would place a check on the extensive ‘informal empire’ that Britain had built up. With French support, he, therefore, convened a conference in Berlin which would place Germany's acquisitions in Africa on an internationally recognised footing and would establish the rules that all powers would follow in future when making territorial claims in the continent.

The Berlin Conference (known as the ‘West Africa Conference’ or the ‘Congo Conference’) convened in November 1884, and remained in session until February 1885. The General Act of the conference made no mention of Togo, Kamerun or any specific territory other than the basin of the Congo. Nevertheless, the conference did confirm the steps required in order for the Powers to recognise each other's territorial claims in West Africa – steps which Nachtigal had followed. Along with a number of claims by other Powers, German claims in West Africa were thus effectively recognised by means of the conference. In parallel with the main conference sessions, discussions were pursued which were intended to avoid possible conflict by tidying up overlapping claims and starting to define borders. Just two months after the Berlin Conference, on 22 April 1885, Germany concluded a treaty with England which established the borders around Mount Cameroon. The following year, on 6 May 1886, another treaty extended the frontier to the east. An agreement with France on 24 December 1885, fixed the Campo River as the southern border of Kamerun.

As these border agreements proceeded, Germany abandoned certain of its claims in order to consolidate its position in Togoland and Kamerun. Thus on 24 October 1885, Mahinland came under British protection in return for territorial compensation to Germany. On 24 December 1885 Kapitaï and Koba were ceded to France in return for compensation in Togo.

In 1884, an expedition led by Eduard Schulze tried to establish a Germany colony near Nokki on the Congo, but it received no official support. The International African Association recognised the German claim, the borders of which were never defined. However at the Berlin Conference Bismarck ceded German rights in Nokki to Portugal.

== Race for the Niger ==
While the Berlin Conference was largely concerned with the Congo, there was also competition between Germany, France and Britain for rights on the Niger, an important artery for the colonization of the interior. Despite the failure of Gottlieb Leonhard Gaiser’s venture in Mahinland, German traders still wanted duty-free access to the upper Niger. The Benue expedition of Paul Staudinger in 1885/86 sought to establish relations with the Sokoto Caliphate and the Emirate of Gwandu, but this did not lead to occupation or protection. Likewise Friedrich Colin’s attempt to reach the headwaters of the Niger from Guinea came to nothing after Germany agreed to cede Kapitaï and Koba (also known as ‘Colinsland’) to France.

In 1894/95 an expedition funded by the Togo Committee and led by Hans Gruner attempted to acquire territories for Germany in the central Niger region. Gruner and his companion Ernst von Carnap-Quernheimb travelled the Niger and concluded "treaties of protection" with chiefs of Gwandu and Gurma. However the French and British representatives signed similar agreements with the same chiefs, so they were of no value to Germany. Other German forays towards Niger, by Erich Kling, Gaston Thierry, Ludwig Wolf and Julius von Zech auf Neuhofen were similarly unsuccessful. Ultimately all Germany was able to gain for its efforts in the Niger basin was favourable adjustments to the border between Togoland and French West Africa when the border was settled by agreement in 1897.

== West African Syndicate ==
In October 1884, with Bismarck's support, the syndicate for West Africa was founded, which was intended to take over the internal administration of the West African colonies. However, the companies involved refused to assume this responsibility on their own and instead demanded the establishment of German government administration. Bismarck's idea of indirect rule in the German "protected areas" had thus failed in West Africa. In 1886, the syndicate dissolved.

== Administrative relations for the German colonies in West Africa ==
The German colonial enterprise in West Africa was started by Gustav Nachtigal as Imperial Commissioner for West Africa. He started formally the "Schutzgebiete" (literally: "protectorates") in Kamerun, Togo and South-West Africa. This connection is reflected in the first legal decrees which were jointly done for the posts of the chief officials in these colonies, i.e. governor of Kamerun and the commissioners of Togo and South West Africa

Later a number of decrees were jointly issued for Kamerun and Togo. Togo was ruled as a separate colony by an Imperial Commissioner (from 1893: "Landeshauptmann") until 1898 who was supervised by a Chief Commissioner ("Oberkomissar") who was at the same time the governor of Kamerun. The first governor of Kamerun, Julius von Soden, was also the Chief Commissioner for Togo. In 1898, the position in Togo was elevated to the rank of governor.

For the courts in charge of Europeans, there was a joint "Appellate Court for the protectorates of Kamerun and Togo" (Kaiserliches Obergericht der Schutzgebiete von Kamerun und Togo).

The designation Deutsch-Westafrika appeared in a few non official publications concerning the two colonies.

A trading company which was active in Kamerun, Togo, Nigeria, and Gold Coast used the name "Deutsch-Westafrikanische Handelsgesellschaft" (German West African Trading Company), founded in 1896 and was also involved in the 1904 founding of the "Deutsch-Westafrikanische Bank" (German West African Bank).

== Territories ==
Areas under German rule in West Africa between 1884 and 1919 were the following (excluding German South West Africa):

Territory	Period	Area (circa)	Population (circa)	Current countries
Altkamerun (without the north-east)	1884–1919	488,000 km^{2} (Excluding "Entenschnabel")	2,588,000	Cameroon; Nigeria
Ambasbay/Victoria	1887–1919	?	12,000	Cameroon
Entenschnabel	1894–1911	12,000 km^{2}	?	Cameroon; Chad
Kapitaï and Koba	1884–1885	2,310 km^{2}	35,000	Guinea
Mahinland	1885	5,210 km^{2}	10,000	Nigeria
Neukamerun (Deutsch-Kongo)	1911–1919	295,000 km^{2}	2,000,000	Gabon; Republic of the Congo; Chad; Central African Republic
Salaga Area (East)	1899–1919	2,800 km^{2}	?	Ghana
Togo	1884–1919	87,200 km^{2} (Including the Eastern Salaga Area)	1,000,000	Ghana; Togo
Total		879,510 km^{2}	5,645,000	

== See also ==
- British West Africa
- French West Africa
- German colonial empire
- German East Africa
