= Emil Riebeck =

German explorer and scientist (1853–1885)

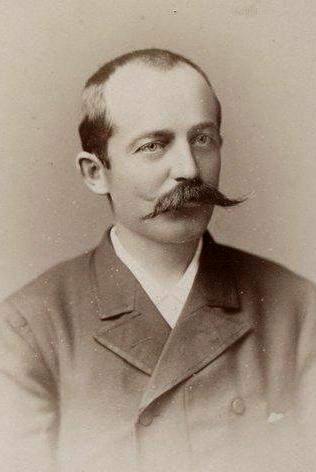
- Born: 11 June 1853; Preußlitz
- Died: 22 June 1885 (aged 32); Feldkirch, Vorarlberg

Emil Riebeck (11 June 1853 – 22 June 1885) was a German explorer, mineralogist, ethnologist, and naturalist. He was born in Preußlitz to Carl Adolf Riebeck, an industrial magnate. He travelled to North Africa and Arabia several times, and in 1881 travelled with Georg Schweinfurth on an expedition to Socotra. He travelled with Adolf Bastian to the hills of Chittagong in 1882.

In 1884, he financed Gottlob Krause’s expedition to the Niger River, Benue River, and Lake Chad.

Riebeck amassed an extensive collection of artifacts from Eastern Asia, India, Arabia, and Africa.

The mineral riebeckite is named after him.

Also, a species of Socotran lizard, Haemodracon riebeckii, is named in his honour.
