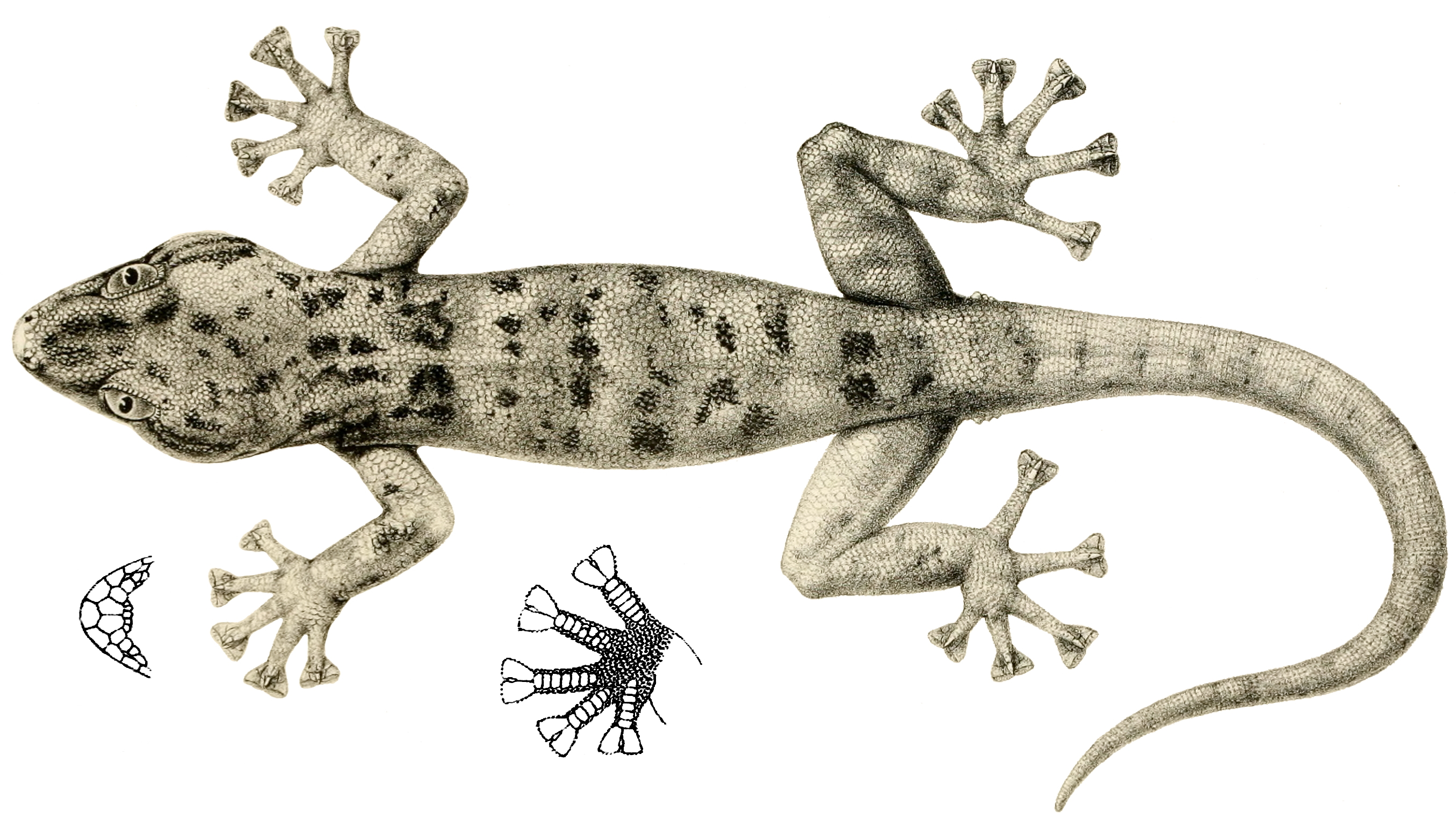

Conservation status
- Least Concern (IUCN 3.1)

Scientific classification
- Kingdom: Animalia
- Phylum: Chordata
- Class: Reptilia
- Order: Squamata
- Suborder: Gekkota
- Family: Phyllodactylidae
- Genus: Haemodracon
- Species: H. riebeckii

Binomial name
- Haemodracon riebeckii (W. Peters, 1882)

Synonyms
- Diplodactylus riebeckii W. Peters, 1882; Ptyodactylus homolepis Blanford, 1887; Phyllodactylus riebeckii — Boulenger, 1885; Ptyodactylus socotranus Steindachner, 1902; Haemodracon riebeckii — Bauer et al., 1997

= Haemodracon riebeckii =

Species of lizard

Haemodracon riebeckii, known as the dragon-tree gecko or blood dragon gecko, is a species of lizard in the family Phyllodactylidae. The species is endemic to the Socotra archipelago, Yemen.

== Etymology ==
The specific name, riebeckii, is in honor of German ethnologist Emil Riebeck.

== Geographic range ==
H. riebeckii is found on Socotra Island and nearby Samhah Island. Both Islands belong to Yemen.

== Habitat ==
The preferred habitats of H. riebeckii are rocky areas and shrubland, at altitudes of 0–938 m (0–3,077 ft).

== Behavior ==
H. riebeckii is active at night.

== Reproduction ==
H. riebeckii is oviparous.
