= Kapitaï and Koba =

Colonies in German West Africa

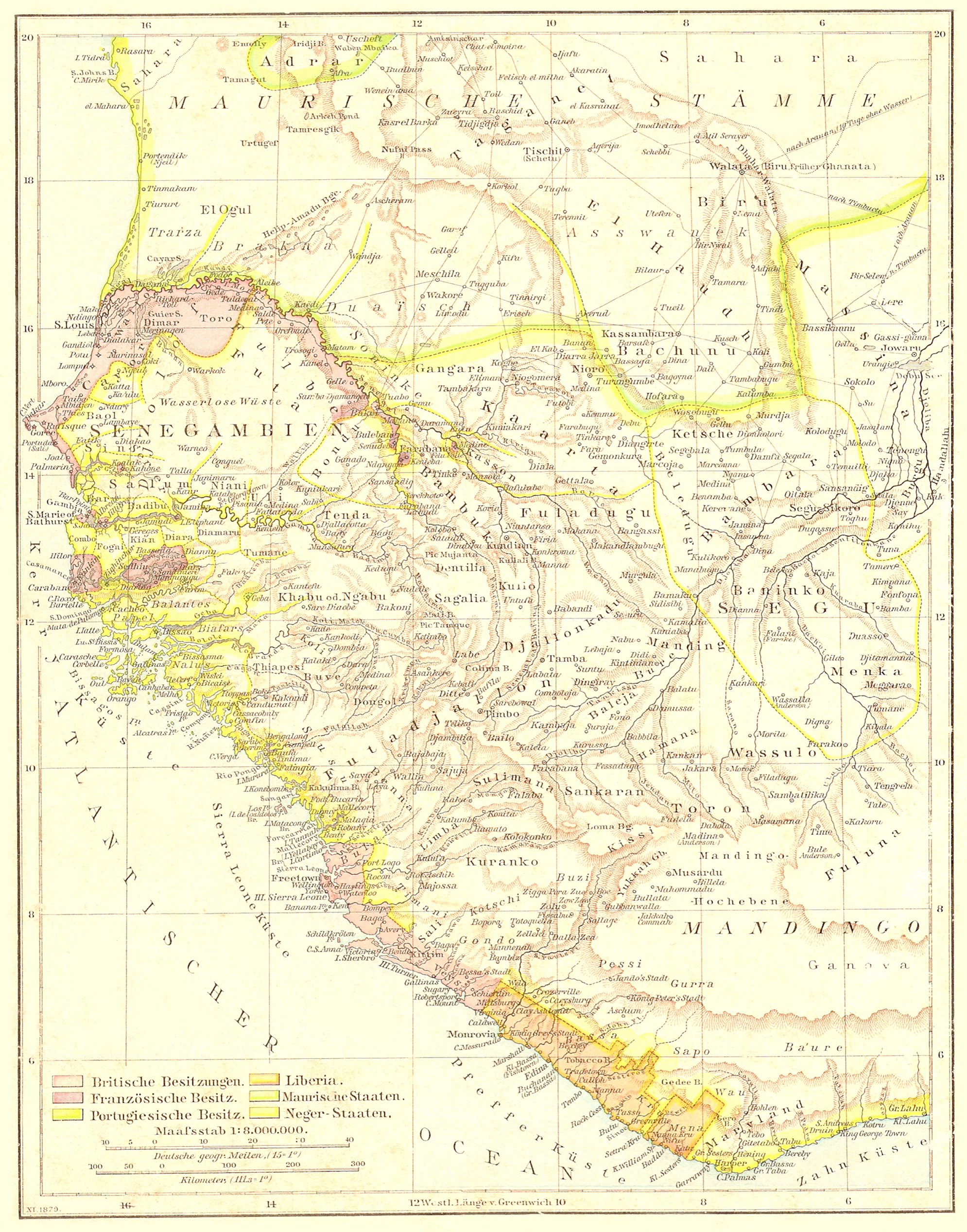
1881 map of Senegambia. The rivers Dubréka and Dembia debouching into the bay are labelled Sangari, with the Los Islands marked as an area of British interest.

Kapitaï and Koba (also known as Kabitai and Coba or Kobah) were two areas on the coast of West Africa which were the object of German colonial initiatives in 1884 and 1885. They lay between the Pongo and Dubréka rivers, south of Senegal and Gambia in modern Guinea; in the terms commonly used in the 19th century they were considered part of Senegambia. The short-lived German colony there was known as the Dembiah colony or Colinsland (after its founder).

== Friedrich Colin’s business interests ==
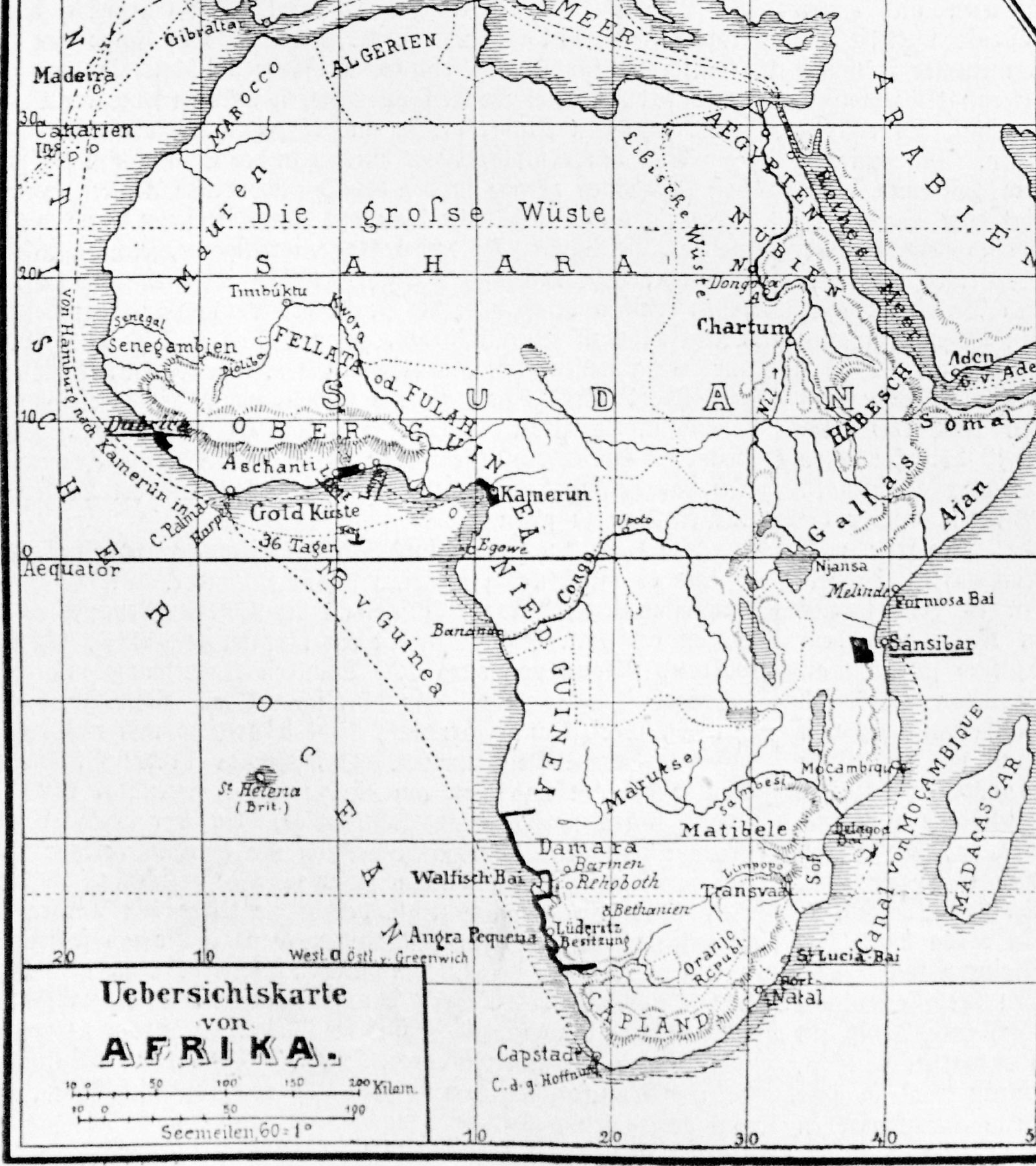
1885 map of German possessions in Africa, with Kapitaï and Koba shown as Dubrica

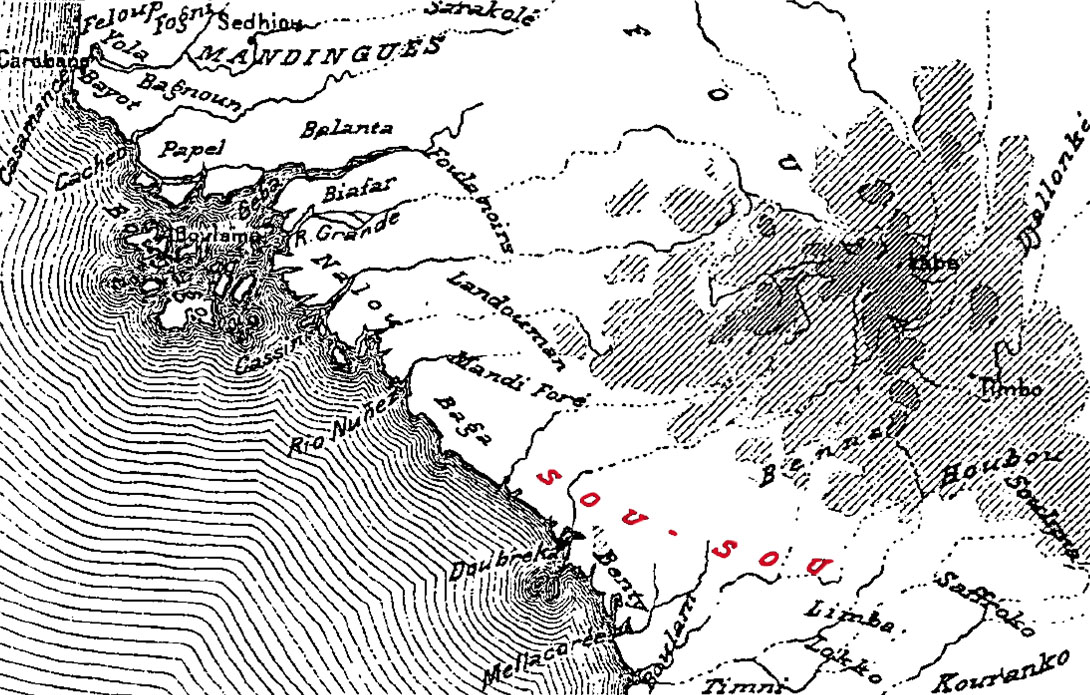
Detailed map of Lower Guinea with the settled areas of Baga and Sousou (late 19th century)

The Stuttgart businessman Friedrich Colin had been trading in West Africa since 1870 on behalf a French company. In 1882, France claimed the region as part of its Rivières du Sud territory, although it did not act to obtain effective control. As a result of this claim Colin broke away from his French partners and set up his own concern, although the Deutscher Kolonialverein declined to give him any support.

In 1883 and 1884, with the support of his brother Ludwig, a director of the Württembergische Vereinsbank in Stuttgart, Colin established trading posts of his own in the unclaimed areas of Baga und Sousou and along the Dubreka river, including one at Bramaia, and signed agreements with the local rulers. In the same region there were also a French trading post and a British one, with German employees. At a meeting of Chancellor Otto von Bismarck with businessmen trading in Africa on April 28, 1884, Colin first called on the government to protect his possessions by annexing territory in Rivières du Sud.

On 9 March 1885, together with partners from Hamburg, Colin founded the firm Fr. Colin, Deutsch-Afrikanisches Geschäft in Frankfurt am Main, to explore and develop trade with West Africa and in particular to reach the source of the Niger in the Fouta Djallon mountains. The founding capital was 600,000 marks of which 420,000 marks was directly subscribed in Frankfurt, with shares at a face value of 10,000 marks. Colin’s trading posts in Africa were brought under the new company. Through his brother, Colin was able to bring on board as partners and sponsors Prince Hermann, Prince of Hohenlohe-Langenburg, Count Friedrich von Frankenberg und Ludwigsdorf, Freiherr Karl von Varnbüler, the bankers Albert Andreae de Neufville and Julius Stern, as well as businessmen Adolf von Brüning, Gustav Godeffroy, Leopold Schoeller and Gustav Siegle. These names assured him of the goodwill of the Foreign Office.

== Establishing “Colinsland” ==
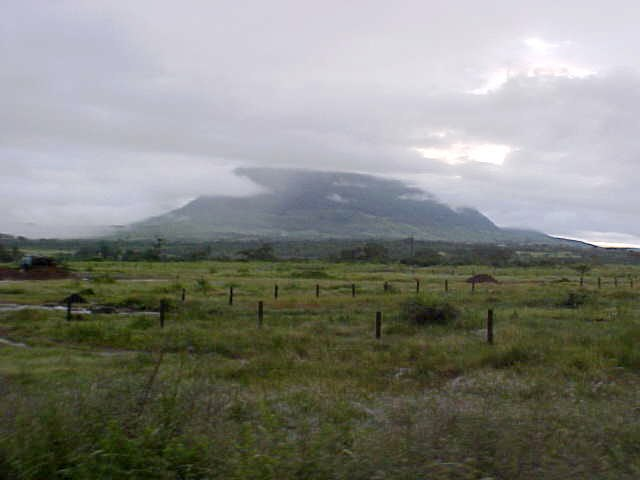
The landscape between Conakry and Kamsar, formerly Koba

The land Colin was claiming consisted of five petty kingdoms Kapitaï, Koba, Bramaia, Dubréka and Sumbuja, of which only the first two were eventually to come under Imperial protection. The hilly and wooded Kapitaï (also Capitay, Kapitay, Kabitai or Khabitaye) lay between the Dembiah and Dubréka rivers around 400–500 metres above sea level. and covered around 1,650 km² in today’s Dubréka Prefecture. The main town was Iatia (Yatiya). The smaller kingdom of Koba (Kobah) lay to the North on a plain between the Dembiah and Pongo Rivers, covering some 660 km² in modern Boffa Prefecture, with its main town at Taboria (Taboriya). At the time Koba was rich in palm, kola, nut and other trees. Kapitaï had rubber trees but was more noted for its iron ore, on account of which its local name translated as "land of the smiths". Both were suitable for the establishment of coffee or cotton plantations. Together, Kapitaï and Koba had around 30-40,000 inhabitants who were predominantly Muslim. Kapitaï comprise around 48 villages, Koba 45. Overseas trade was conducted mostly by barter, exchanging rubber and copal for cotton cloth, liquor, gunpowder and flintlocks.

To the south, the kingdom of Sumbuja (also Sumbayland, Simbaya, Symbaya or Sumbujo) in the modern Coyah Prefecture, with its centre at Wonkifong, had been thrown into disorder in 1884 following the death of its ruler. Colin’s local agents Louis Baur, Eduard Schmidt and Johannes Voss signed an agreement with one of the pretenders to the throne, Mory Fode, on 11 July 1884, and on 13 July signed another with Alkali Bangali, ruler of Kapitaï. After signing an identical agreement with Allie Te Uri of Koba on 10 October 1884, Colin proposed in a letter to Bismarck on 12 October that the German Empire should assume the status of protector of these territories. King Bala Demba of Dubréka, father of the king of Kapitaï also sent a letter, forwarded to Berlin by Colin, in which he asked Kaiser Wilhelm I to send traders and promised to protect them.

The somewhat ambiguous agreements with King Mory and King Alkali each guaranteed, in return for an annual salary of $200 that Sumbuja and Kapitaï would not enter into agreements with other powers without the approval of Germany, and would leave trading arrangements to Colin. The royal families, their subjects and the whole countries were to be placed under German "protection", with disputes between Europeans and Africans governed by German law. Mory and Alkali were to make grants of land to Colin at no charge for the erection of roads, roads, bridges, railroads and German mission schools, and to provide the workers necessary for construction and maintenance.

== French claims and Nachtigal’s expedition ==
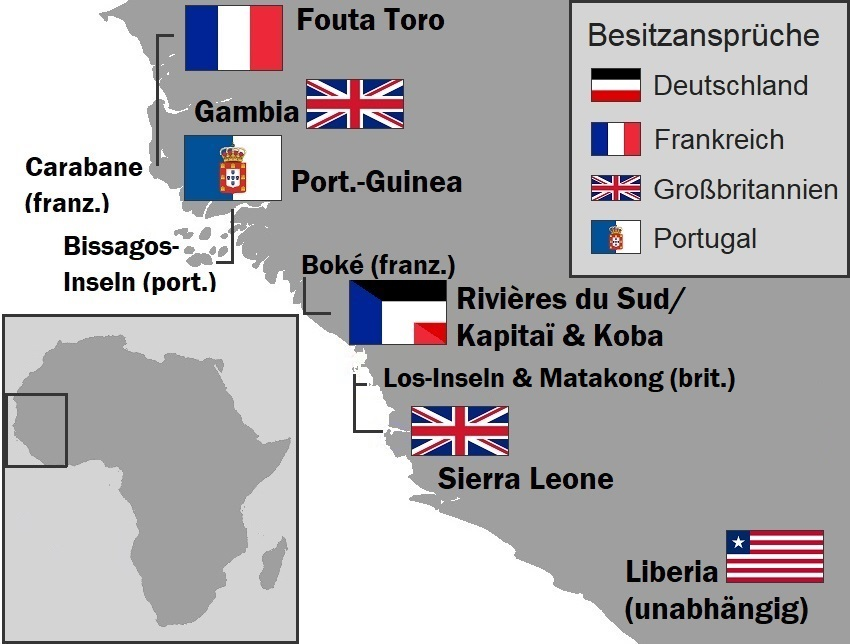
European claims on the coast of West Africa in 1885. Rivières du Sud, including Kapitaï and Koba were disputed by France and Germany.

As early as 1880, French colonial agents from Senegal had been signing agreements with other chiefs and kings of the region. The French Government therefore laid claim to the entire territory between the Pongo River to the north and Sierra Leone in the south. France imposed customs duties on goods brought into the region from Europe and required health certificates and anchorage fees from visiting ships.

In June 1884 the Imperial Commissioner for German West Africa (later Togo and Cameroon), Gustav Nachtigal, and his representative, Max Buchner arrived on board the warships SMS Möwe and SMS Elisabeth with the aim of testing the new German claims against those of France. Nachtigal presented Bala Demba with a reply from the German Emperor Wilhelm I and a gilded Renaissance sword as a gift. (Another gift, an iron equestrian statue of the Emperor, was not presented out of consideration for the proscription of images in Islam).

However, the hoped-for conclusion of a treaty of protection did not take place. According to Buchner, Bala Demba was "apparently against writing". Nachtigal and Buchner therefore returned to their ships and steamed away. Alarmed by Colin's treaties and the presence of German warships, on 3 September 1884 France formally established a protectorate over the whole of Bramayaland (Bramiah, in today's Fria Prefecture) and extended its claims to the Fouta Djallon (source of the Niger, Senegal and Gambia Rivers).

== The Ariadne expedition ==
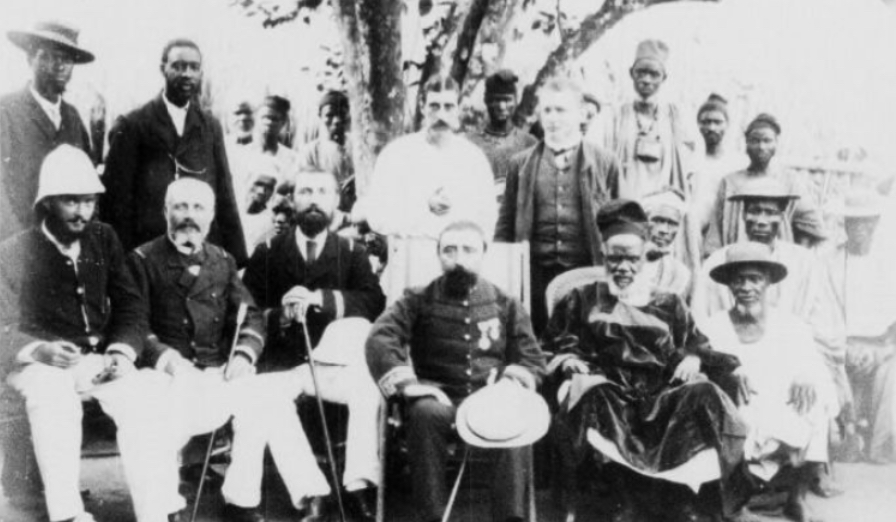
King William Fernandez of Bramiah (front, second from right) with the future governor Jean-Marie Bayol in 1885

Unlike Nachtigal, who considered that French claims made conditions unsuitable for German colonial acquisitions in Senegambia or Guinea, Colin recognised no French rights and in October 1884 urged the government to send another warship to protect his possessions. The government made a commitment to do so in November 1884 and at the end of December 1884 the corvette SMS Ariadne arrived at the mouth of the Dubréka and placed the region under German protection. The Ariadne headed a short way up the rivers Dubréka and Dembia at the end of December 1884. On January 1, 1885 a steam launch took Lieutenant Commander Chüden, Lieutenant du Bois, Lieutenant Oppenheimer and five other Germans ashore. Like Colin, Chüden did not consider the areas he was visiting to be French territory. The Bramiah king William Fernandez received Chüden hospitably and was willing to cooperate, but said he had already signed agreements with France, most recently on September 4, 1884. Chüden therefore abandoned the plan to raise the German flag there.

The next day the Germans went on to Yatiya (Jatia) where Chüden met on the king of Kapitaï, Alkali Bangali. On 2 January 1885 he finally had the German flag hoisted at Sangaréa Bay in the presence of the King, the German officers and some sailors. Kapitaï was thenceforth considered the property of the house of F. Colin in Stuttgart. The king of Koba, Allie Te Uri, was opposed to French demands for cooperation and willingly agreed with the German representatives to raise the German flag in three of his villages between 4 and 6 January 1885. This raising of the flag was communicated to the neighboring French military post of Boffa.

On 6 January 1885 Emperor Wilhelm I issued an official letter of protection for the Dubréka and Dembia colonies. Colin agreed to pay the cost of building a German colonial administration, but this never happened. As a result of the West Africa Conference, France and Germany began to delineate their spheres of influence and spheres of influence as of February 1885. Bismarck’s aim was to weaken French revanchism and to encourage its colonial ambitions instead, which would have the effect of pitting France against England.

== Agreement with France ==
After Nachtigal's death in April 1885 the German ambassador in Paris, Prince Chlodwig zu Hohenlohe-Schillingsfürst, sought an understanding with France. Colin’s interests were not the only ones to be considered: the German firm of Wölber & Brohm was campaigning to round out the borders of Togoland in return for renouncing Kapitaï and Koba and Bismarck placed greater value of good relations with France than on trying to secure Colin’s possessions. On the other hand the ambassador’s cousin Prince Hohenlohe-Langenburg, who sat on the board of Colin's company, tried to persuade him to ask France to renounce its claims on Kapitaï and Koba, otherwise Colin's company would suffer significant losses. Negotiations paused in the summer of 1885, but when they resumed in November of the same year, Herbert von Bismarck's threat to Paris that "if necessary, Germany would definitely settle Sangareah Bay" was only a bluff to force a decision.

In the German-French Protocol of 24 December 1885, Germany finally acknowledged France's sovereignty over the region. In return, the German Empire received Batanga in Cameroon and Anecho in Togo by way of compensation. Colin's "German-African business" fell under French jurisdiction and Prince Hermann zu Hohenlohe-Langenburg withdrew from the company.

== Modern era ==
In modern Guinea Koba together with Taboriya forms the subprefecture of Koba-Tatema in Boffa Prefecture. Khabitaye is a 4,900 hectare national park, while Kapitaï’s former administrative centre of Yatiya now falls within the subprefecture of Khorira.

== See also ==
- German West Africa
