= Haemodracon trachyrhinus =

Conservation status
- Least Concern (IUCN 3.1)

Scientific classification
- Kingdom: Animalia
- Phylum: Chordata
- Class: Reptilia
- Order: Squamata
- Suborder: Gekkota
- Family: Phyllodactylidae
- Genus: Haemodracon
- Species: H. trachyrhinus

Binomial name
- Haemodracon trachyrhinus (Boulenger, 1899)

Species of lizard

Haemodracon trachyrhinus, the rough-nosed haemodracon, is a species of lizard in the family Phyllodactylidae. It is endemic to Socotra. They are active at night and live mainly in rocky habitats.

== Geographic Range ==
Endemic to Socotra island, part of the socotra Archipelago in Yemen.
