= Ockrilla =

Village in Meissen, Saxony, Germany

Coordinates: 51°11′40″N 13°30′25″E

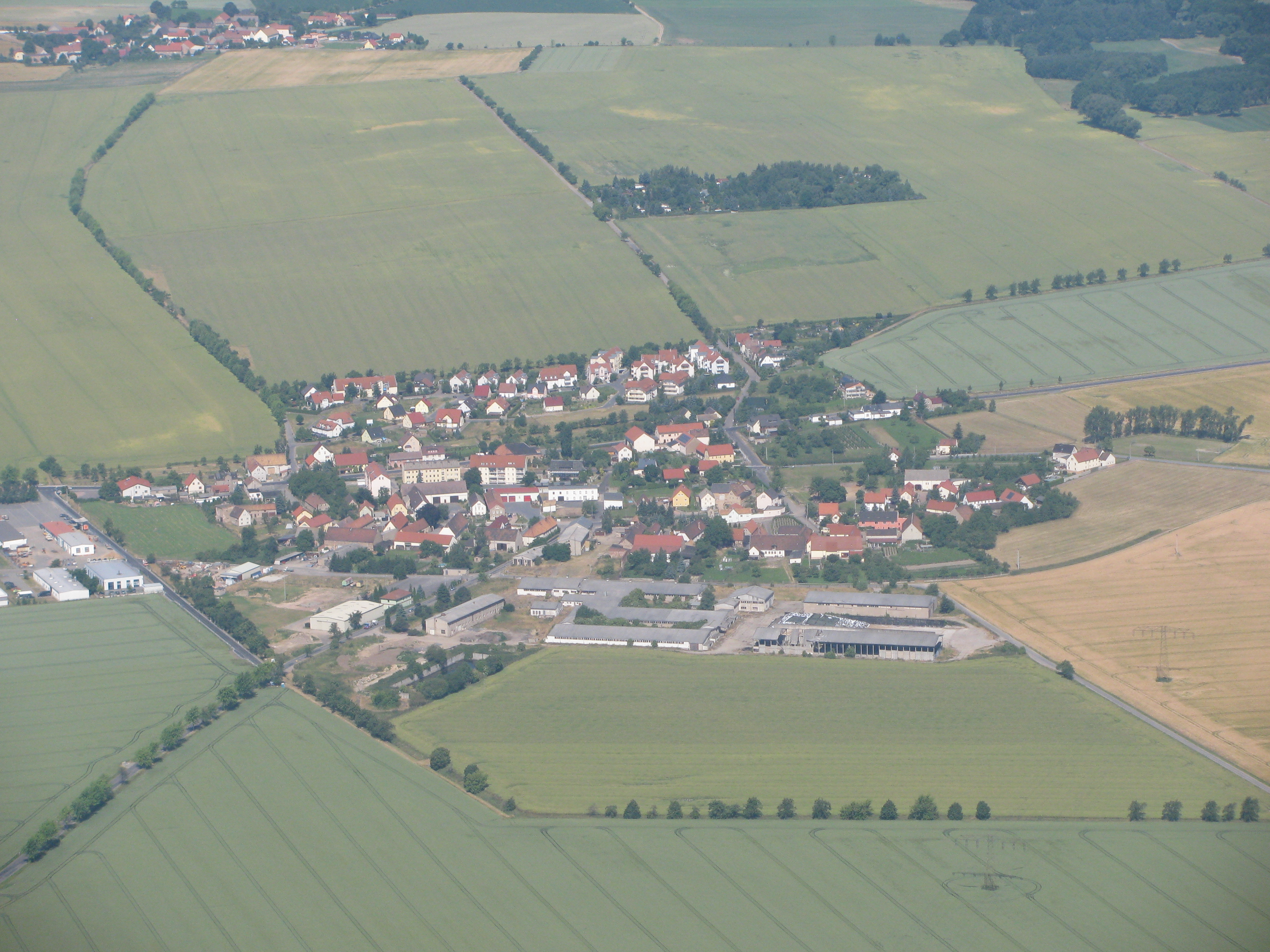
Aerial view Niederau-Ockrilla

Ockrilla, is a village in the district of Meissen, Saxony, Germany. With 633 inhabitants, it is the largest village in the municipality of Niederau.

The village was the birthplace of Gottlob Krause.
