= Carl Adolf Riebeck =

German industrialist and mining entrepreneur

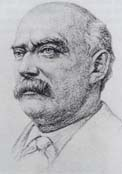

Carl Adolf Riebeck, originally Carl Adolph Riebeck (27 September 1821 in Clausthal – 28 January 1883 in Halle) was an industrialist and mining entrepreneur. The controversy around his sole possession after his death led to the establishment of A. Riebeck’sche Montanwerke by his heirs.

== Personal life ==
Riebeck was born into a mining family from Clausthal. In 1827, his father, Steiger, a mine surveyor's assistant, moved with his family to Harzgerode to work in the Lower Harz ironstone mines in Anhalt.

In 1847, Riebeck married Maria Renk ( 1825-1873 ). From this marriage 7 children were born, of which three survived to adulthood. Of these 7 children, only two were sons, Emil Riebeck and Paul Riebeck. His daughter Margaret (1864-1904) married General Reinhard Gottlob Georg Heinrich Freiherr von Scheffer-Boyadel, who was knighted in 1890. His daughter Maria married geoscientist Herbert Credner in 1872.

In 1877, Riebeck married his second wife, Emilie Balthasar, producing two children.

His grave is located on the Halle Stadtgottesacker.

== Career ==
Riebeck eventually left school to begin working in 1835 as a pit boy and later as Lehrhäuer in Harzgerode's Albertine ironstone mine. At the age of 18, he left the Harz mountains to work in the brown coal mines of Zeitz and Weissenfels. He attended a mining school in Eisleben and qualified to become a mining foreman.

After an accident, Riebeck was sentenced to one year of imprisonment for criminal breach of duty, which he served between 1848 and 1849. After his release, he found a job at Sächsisch-Thüringischen Aktiengesellschaft, that excavated brown coal. In 1856 he was promoted to the post of mining inspector.

He resigned in 1858 after realizing that he would not be considered for a higher position. He bought brown coal mines in the area of Bitterfeld und Weißenfels and soon began mining operations. Riebeck borrowed money to invest in the upgrade of coal technology as well as distillation units for the production of paraffin, mineral oil and tar. The petroleum factories of Gosserau, Webau, Reußen bei Theißen and Oberröblingen became the foundation of Riebeck's empire.

Within a few years, Riebeck acquired refining plants and briquette factories in Hall, Schwelereien, Whiterock and Bitterfeld. He developed brown coal mining into a large scale industry within Saxony and Thuringia.

Riebeck later became the wealthiest citizen of Halle, operating the Riebecksche brewery, Leipziger Brauhaus zu Reudnitz, in the Saxon Reudnitz and some manors.

Even before social legislation was created, he provided social security measures for his workers.

=== References ===
- Hermann Krey: Carl Adolph Riebeck. In: Mitteldeutsche Lebensbilder, 1. Band Lebensbilder des 19. Jahrhunderts, Magdeburg 1926, S. 258-270
- P. Franke et al.: 25 Jahre Carl Adolph Riebeck 50 Jahre A. Riebeck'sche Montanwerke Aktiengesellschaft 1858–1933, München 1933
- Sebastian Kranich: Mathäus Ludwig Wucherer, Carl August Jacob, Johann Gottfried Boltze, Carl Adolph Riebeck: Christliche Unternehmer im Raum Halle. In: Ders., Peggy Renger-Berka, Klaus Tanner (Hg.): Diakonissen - Unternehmer - Pfarrer. Sozialer Protestantismus in Mitteldeutschland im 19. Jahrhundert, Leipzig 2009, ISBN 978-3-374-02686-9, S. 83–118, hier S. 111–118.
- Petra Listewnik (2003). "Riebeck, Carl Adolph". Neue Deutsche Biographie (in German). Vol. 21. Berlin: Duncker & Humblot. pp. 557–558. (full text online).

== Links ==
- Literature by and about Carl Adolf Riebeck in the German National Library catalogue
- Biographie (leicht fehlerhaft)
- Der Riebeck-Konzern
