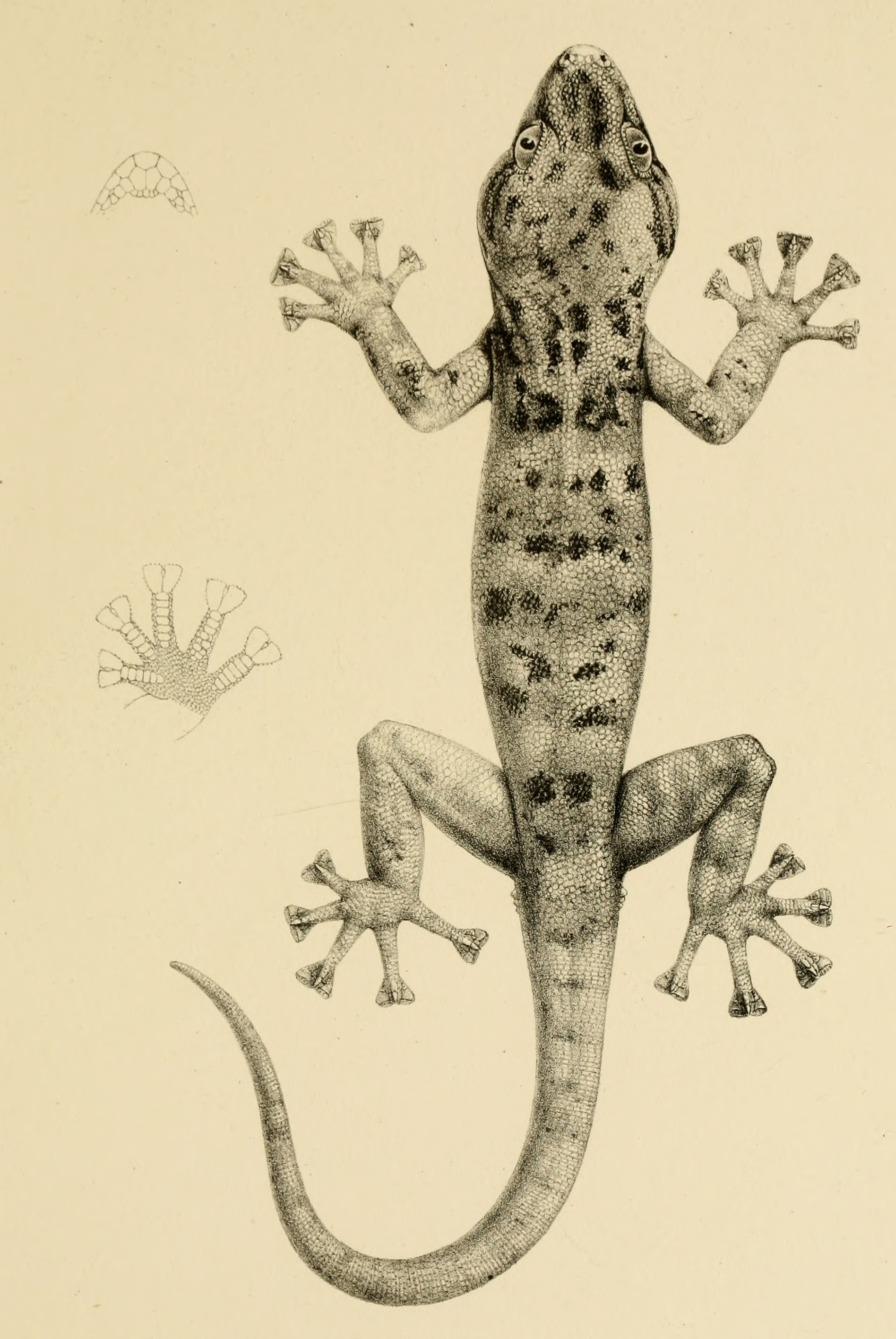
- Haemodracon riebeckii

Scientific classification
- Kingdom: Animalia
- Phylum: Chordata
- Class: Reptilia
- Order: Squamata
- Suborder: Gekkota
- Family: Phyllodactylidae
- Genus: Haemodracon; Bauer, Good & Branch, 1997

= Haemodracon =

Genus of lizards

Haemodracon is a small genus of rare geckos from Socotra archipelago.

It contains the following species:

- Haemodracon riebeckii (W. Peters, 1882) — type species
- Haemodracon trachyrhinus (Boulenger, 1899)

The genus name is related to Dracaena cinnabari — the most famous tree of Socotra. It gives a red resin known as dragon's blood. The word Haemodracon is derived from the Latinized Greek haema-, meaning "blood", and dracon meaning "dragon".
