= SMS Gneisenau (1879) =

Screw corvette of the German Imperial Navy

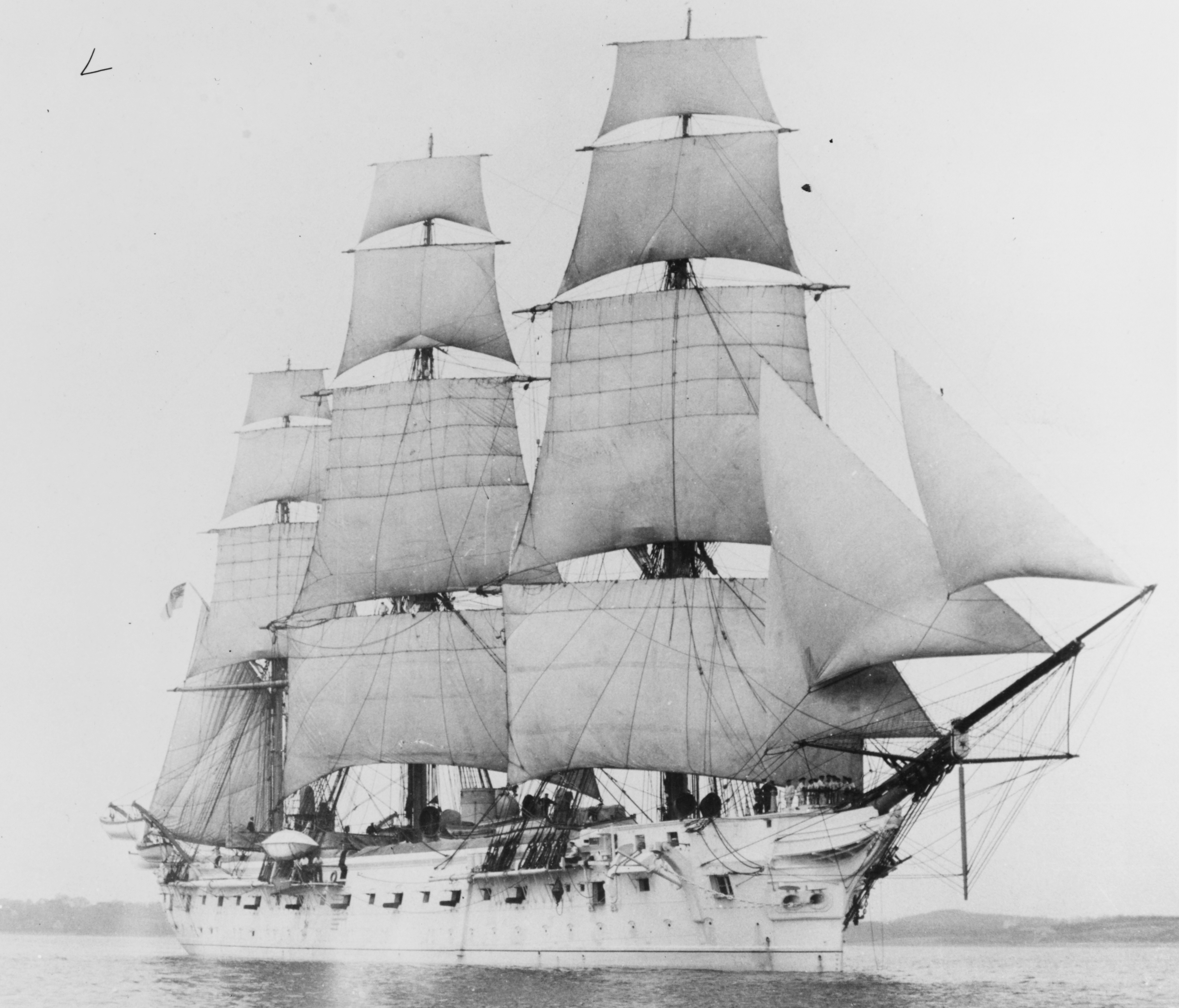
- Gneisenau in the 1890s

History

German Empire
- Name: SMS Gneisenau
- Namesake: Field Marshal August von Gneisenau
- Builder: Kaiserliche Werft Danzig, Danzig
- Laid down: June 1877
- Launched: 4 September 1879
- Commissioned: 3 October 1880
- Fate: Sunk in storm off Málaga, Spain, 16 December 1900

General characteristics
- Class & type: Bismarck-class corvette
- Displacement: Full load: 2,994 t (2,947 long tons)
- Length: 82 m (269 ft)
- Beam: 13.7 m (44 ft 11 in)
- Draft: 5.2 m (17 ft 1 in)
- Installed power: 2,866 ihp (2,137 kW); 4 × fire-tube boilers
- Propulsion: 1 × screw propeller; 1 × marine steam engine
- Speed: 13.8 knots (25.6 km/h; 15.9 mph)
- Range: 2,380 nmi (4,410 km; 2,740 mi) at 12 knots (22 km/h; 14 mph)
- Complement: 452 (including trainees)
- Armament: 14 × 15 cm (5.9 in) guns; 2 × 88 mm (3.5 in) quick-firing guns; 6 × 37 mm (1.5 in) Hotchkiss revolver cannon

SMS Gneisenau was a Bismarck-class corvette built for the German Imperial Navy (Kaiserliche Marine) in the late 1870s. The ship was named after the Prussian Field Marshal August von Gneisenau. She was the fifth member of the class, which included five other vessels. The Bismarck-class corvettes were ordered as part of a major naval construction program in the early 1870s, and she was designed to serve as a fleet scout and on extended tours in Germany's colonial empire. Gneisenau was laid down in June 1877, launched in September 1879, and was commissioned into the fleet in October 1880. She was armed with a battery of fourteen 15 cm (5.9 in) guns and had a full ship rig to supplement her steam engine on long cruises abroad.

Gneisenau went abroad on two major foreign deployments in the first decade of her career. The first, in 1882, was to protect German nationals in Egypt during the 'Urabi revolt, though by the time she arrived, British forces had largely defeated the rebels, allowing Gneisenau to return home. The second, lengthier deployment came two years later and lasted from 1884 to 1886, and primarily focused on German colonial designs on eastern Africa. She was involved in the seizure of the colony of German East Africa in 1885, and she briefly toured German interests in the Pacific Ocean in 1886.

In 1887, Gneisenau began her service as a training ship, a role she held for more than a decade. During this period, she was generally occupied with training cruises and individual, squadron, and fleet training. Long-distance cruises frequently alternated between the West Indies and the Mediterranean Sea. While on one such cruise on 16 December 1900, the ship was driven into the mole outside Málaga by heavy winds and destroyed, with the loss of 41 officers and crew. Her wreck proved impossible to salvage, and so she was sold for scrap shortly after the accident.

== Design ==
An unidentified Bismarck-class corvette

The six ships of the Bismarck class were ordered in the early 1870s to supplement Germany's fleet of cruising warships, which at that time relied on several ships that were twenty years old. Gneisenau and her sister ships were intended to patrol Germany's colonial empire and safeguard German economic interests around the world. They were designed as a smaller and more economical version of the preceding Leipzig-class corvettes.

Gneisenau was 82 meters (269 ft) long overall, with a beam of 13.7 m (44 ft 11 in) and a draft of 5.2 m (17 ft 1 in) forward. She displaced 2,994 metric tons (2,947 long tons) at full load. The ship's crew consisted of 18 officers and 386 enlisted men. Her hull had a straight stem and was sheathed with zinc to prevent marine biofouling on long voyages abroad.

She was powered by a single marine steam engine that drove one 2-bladed screw propeller, with steam provided by four coal-fired fire-tube boilers, which was vented through a single, retractable funnel. Her propulsion system gave her a top speed of 13.8 knots (25.6 km/h; 15.9 mph) at 2,866 metric horsepower (2,827 ihp). She had a cruising radius of 2,380 nautical miles (4,410 km; 2,740 mi) at a speed of 12 knots (22 km/h; 14 mph). As built, Gneisenau was equipped with a full ship rig, but this was later reduced.

Gneisenau was armed with a battery of sixteen 15 cm (5.9 in) 22-caliber (cal.) breech-loading guns and four 8 cm (3.1 in) 25-cal. guns. Her armament was revised several times during her career; by 1890, the number of 15 cm guns had been reduced to ten. She also had six 3.7 cm (1.5 in) Hotchkiss revolver cannon installed for close-range defense against torpedo boats. During another refit in the 1890s, she had four of her 15 cm guns restored, bringing the total to fourteen. She also received a pair of 8.8 cm (3.5 in) guns were added, along with four 6 cm (2.4 in) guns. In the early 1900s, she was rearmed with a pair of 10.5 cm (4.1 in) guns, ten 8.8 cm guns, and four 3.7 cm guns.

== Service history ==
=== Construction and first overseas deployment ===
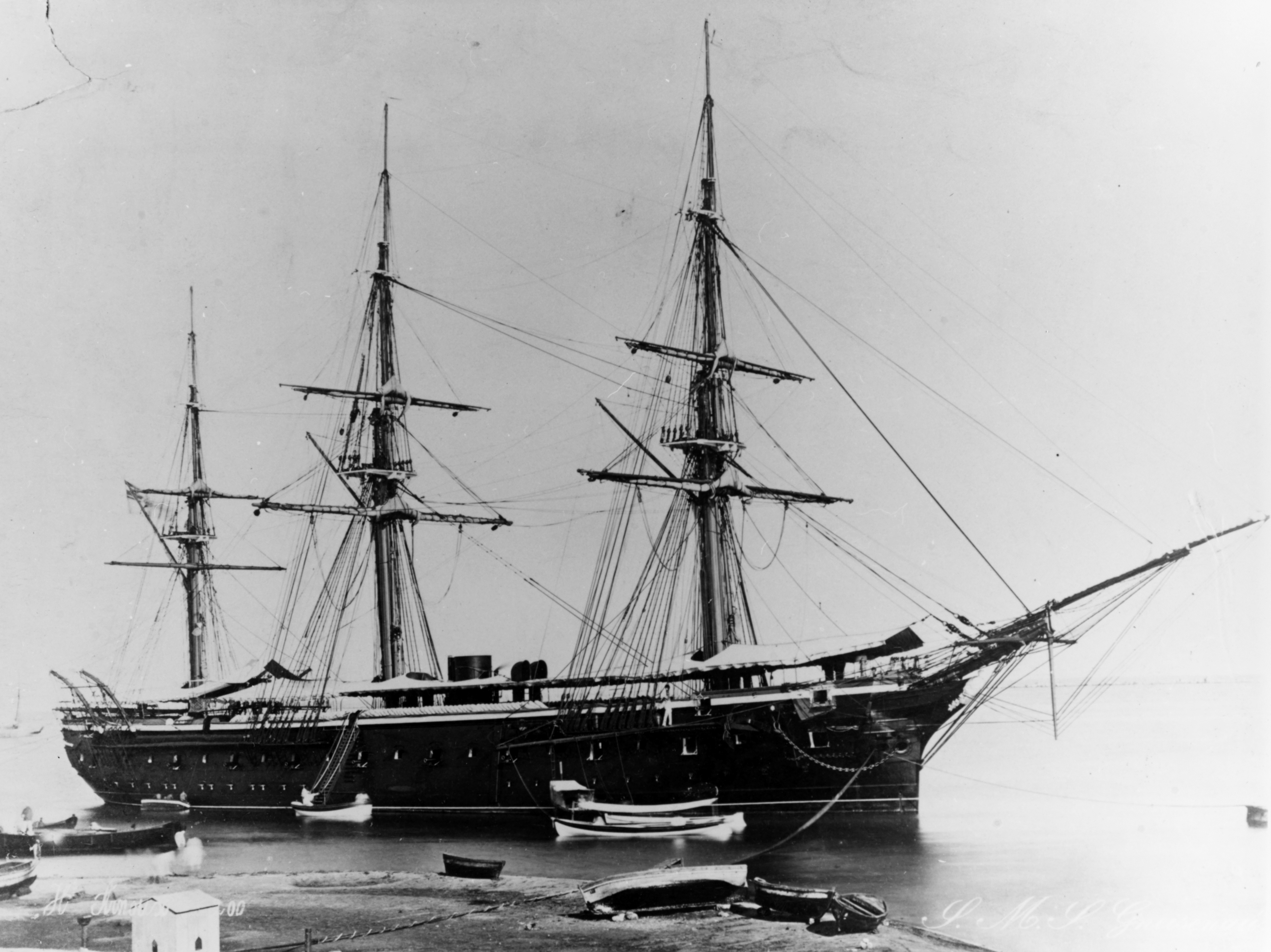
Gneisenau in port, likely in the 1880s

The new corvette, ordered under the contract name "D", (Note: German warships were ordered under provisional names. Additions to the fleet were given a single letter; ships intended to replace older or lost vessels were ordered as "Ersatz (name of the ship to be replaced)".) was laid down in June 1877 at the Kaiserliche Werft (Imperial Shipyard) in Danzig (Gdańsk). She was launched on 4 September 1879, and was christened with the name Gneisenau, after the veteran of the Napoleonic Wars and Prussian military reformer Generalfeldmarschall (Field Marshal) August von Gneisenau, during the launching ceremony by Admiral Albrecht von Stosch, the head of the Kaiserliche Admiralität (Imperial Admiralty). She was commissioned on 3 October 1880 before work on the ship actually finished in order to transfer her to the Kaiserliche Werft in Kiel, where her guns were installed. Sea trials were then conducted, lasting from the end of December to 12 February 1881, after which she was decommissioned and placed in reserve. Her commander during this period was Kapitän zur See (KzS—Captain at Sea) Bartholomäus von Werner. At the time, Stosch had implemented a plan whereby Germany's colonies would be protected by gunboats, while larger warships would generally be kept in reserve, with a handful assigned to a flying squadron that could respond to crises quickly.

By the early 1880s, French and British controls in Egypt and particularly the Suez Canal produced the 'Urabi revolt, led by Ahmed ‘Urabi. In June 1882, the revolutionaries, angered by foreign influence in the country, murdered fifty Europeans, prompting the British Royal Navy to bombard Alexandria and then land forces to pursue the rebels. In the wake of the conflict, the German government determined that warships should be sent to protect Germans in the country. Initially hoping to avoid mobilizing any vessels in Germany to keep the cost of the operation to a minimum, the Admiralität ordered a pair of gunboats, Habicht and Möwe, that had been returning from overseas deployments to proceed to Egypt. There, they sent sailors ashore to protect Germans in Alexandria and Port Said, respectively.

These two small vessels proved to be insufficient for the task, and so on 13 August, Gneisenau, the corvette Nymphe, the aviso Zieten, and the gunboat Cyclop were commissioned to reinforce them. They departed Kiel on 19 August, under the command of Gneisenau's captain KzS Max von der Goltz, who was made Kommodore of the squadron. The ships arrived in Port Said on 21 August, and on 13 September the British defeated 'Urabi's forces at the Battle of Tell El Kebir, effectively ending the rebellion. The paddle steamer Loreley, the station ship in Constantinopel, joined the German squadron in the area. The German squadron remained in the area until December, primarily to protect the German embassy in Alexandria, when the squadron was disbanded; Gneisenau arrived back in Kiel on 24 December, where she was decommissioned on 9 January 1883, though Nymphe and Cyclop remained in the eastern Mediterranean Sea as a precaution against further unrest.

=== Second overseas deployment ===
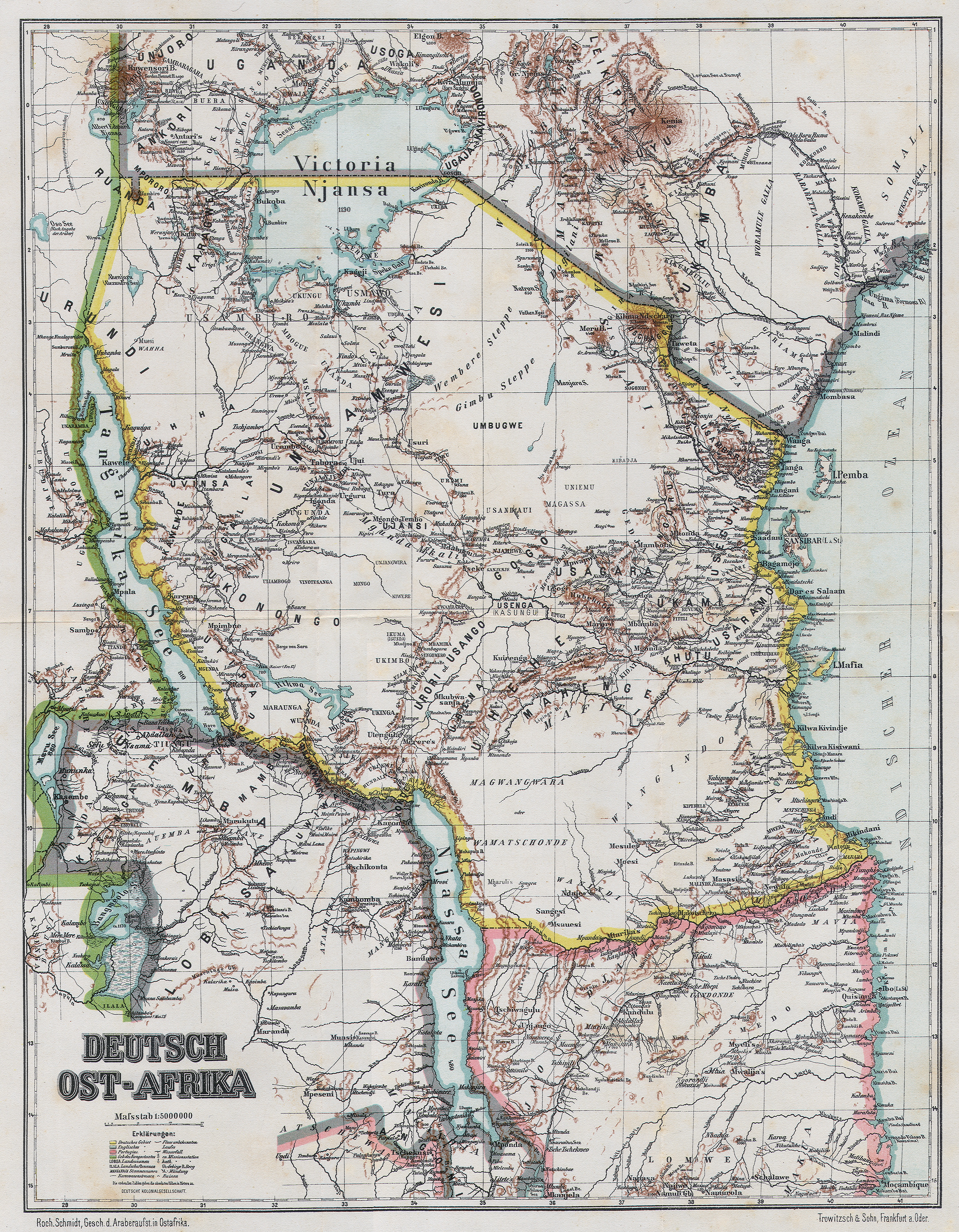
Contemporary map of German East Africa

Gneisenau was recommissioned for another tour abroad on 5 October 1884 to join the newly-formed West African Cruiser Squadron, which was commanded by Konteradmiral (Rear Admiral) Eduard von Knorr aboard his flagship Bismarck. The ship's new commander was KzS Victor Valois. While en route from Kiel to Wilhelmshaven to join the rest of the squadron, Gneisenau ran aground off the island of Lolland in heavy fog; she had to be towed free by the ironclad Hansa, though she was undamaged in the accident. The squadron left Wilhelmshaven on 30 October, bound for West Africa. While in the Cape Verde islands, Knorr detached Gneisenau to Cape Town, where she arrived on 8 January 1885. There, she embarked Friedrich Gerhard Rohlfs, who had been appointed consul to Zanzibar, and took him to the island on 28 January. Gneisenau then went to the port of Lamu to survey the coast of eastern Africa, particularly the area around Wituland. Gneisenau's survey of the area led the German government to instruct Rohlfs to accept the offer of the Witu Sultan, Ahmed ibn Fumo Bakari, to form a protectorate on 27 May.

Gneisenau left Zanzibar on 1 April, bound for Melbourne, Australia, where she was to meet the corvette Augusta in August, but Augusta sank in the Bab-el-Mandeb. Gneisenau instead proceeded on to Port Louis on the island of Mauritius. There, she met the cruiser squadron commanded by Kommodore Carl Paschen, which included her sister ship Stosch and the corvette Prinz Adalbert, the frigate Elisabeth, and the supply ship Ehrenfels. Paschen had been tasked to take his squadron to East Africa to settle disputes over the German protectorate with the Sultan of Zanzibar, Barghash bin Said, which he accomplished by mid-August. On 18 August, Bismarck arrived with Knorr, who replaced Paschen as the squadron commander. Knorr sent Gneisenau to Wituland, where Valois informed Bakari that the Sultan of Zanzibar had agreed to recognize the protectorate and stop interfering in the internal affairs of Wituland. After anchoring in Lamu on 28 August, Gneisenau sent a contingent ashore, led by the executive officer, Curt von Prittwitz und Gaffron, to hold a parade to celebrate the agreement. Three days later, Valois took three officers and twenty-nine enlisted men to the Witu capital to meet Bakari, returning to the ship on 4 September.

Gneisenau departed Lamu on 6 September and went to Kismayu, before proceeding on to Zanzibar four days later. In the meantime, Paschen had been instructed to form a second cruiser squadron, which was to consist of his flagship Stosch, along with Gneisenau and Prinz Adalbert. The squadron was to proceed to the Caroline Islands, which were at the center of a dispute between Germany and Spain. Gneisenau first went to Cape Town, arriving on 11 October. While there, she received new orders to proceed instead to what was now German East Africa; on 9 November she was formally reassigned back to Knorr's squadron. Gneisenau patrolled the coast of East Africa until 6 March 1886, when Knorr's squadron, at that time consisting of Gneisenau, Bismarck, and the corvette Olga, departed for Australia. After reaching the south Pacific, the ships toured Australian ports, New Zealand, Tonga, and Samoa before Gneisenau was detached first to the Gazelle Peninsula on the island of New Pomerania to suppress an uprising against German colonial rule. She then went to the Palau Islands, part of the Caroline group, to retrieve a German monument, as Germany had dropped its claim to the islands in favor of Spain. On 25 July, Gneisenau began the journey back to Germany, reaching Kiel on 27 September. She was decommissioned there on 14 October.

=== Training ship duties ===
An unidentified member of the class, likely in the 1890s

==== 1887–1895 ====
Gneisenau returned to service on 13 April 1887 under the command of KzS August von Thomsen, now in the role of a training ship for naval cadets and four-year enlisted volunteers. In late May, she joined the Training Squadron, which was present at the ceremony marking the beginning on construction of the Kaiser Wilhelm Canal on 3 June. The squadron took part in the annual fleet training exercises that began on 6 August; during the maneuvers, the squadron filled the role of the II Division of the main fleet. After the exercises concluded the following month, the Training Squadron embarked on a winter cruise to the Mediterranean. During this voyage, the squadron flagship, Stein, caught fire and had to be docked for repairs, during which time Gneisenau served as the flagship from 19 November 1887 to 8 January 1888. On the way back to Germany in 1888, the ships stopped at Cape St. Vincent and in Funchal, before arriving back in Wilhelmshaven on 10 April. Gneisenau proceeded on to Kiel, where she underwent an overhaul. The ship embarked on individual training exercises after returning to service before rejoining the Training Squadron on 25 June. The following month, the squadron escorted Kaiser Wilhelm II on a tour of Scandinavian ports aboard the ironclad Baden.

The Training Squadron began another Mediterranean cruise on 29 September, during which they participated in celebrations commemorating the 25th anniversary of King George I of Greece. The ships toured ports in the Ottoman Empire in Asia Minor and Egypt. On 16 April 1889, Gneisenau and the other training ships arrived back in Wilhelmshaven. Gneisenau moved to Kiel, where on 30 April she was again decommissioned. On 1 January 1891, Gneisenau was formally re-designated as a training ship. The ship remained out of service until 1 April 1892, when she was reactivated for a cruise in the Baltic and North Seas under the command of Korvettenkapitän (KK—Corvette Captain) Felix Stubenrauch. In August and September, she took part in the annual fleet maneuvers, and beginning on 3 October, she participated in the winter cruise, which this time went to the West Indies and Venezuela. While in the Caribbean Sea, the German squadron met the French West Indies Squadron and exchanged formal visits between the squadrons' commanders. On the way back to Germany, the squadron spent a month in British waters, from 22 May to 21 June, during which time they took part in the Cowes Regatta with Wilhelm II aboard the new aviso Blitz.

Upon returning to Germany, she underwent a short overhaul before joining the ships of III Division during the fleet training exercise in August and September. During the maneuvers she accidentally collided with the torpedo boat D2, which was badly damaged. Gneisenau continued in the exercises until she too was decommissioned for repairs on 30 September. On 3 April 1894, Gneisenau embarked on the summer training cruise, which this year just went to Christiana, Norway and concluded with the Kiel Week regatta. The ships thereafter took part in the fleet maneuvers in August and September again as III Division, with Gneisenau's commander now KK Hermann da Fonseca-Wollheim. On 1 October, Gneisenau began the winter training cruise to the Mediterranean, and while in La Valletta, Malta, she met the unprotected cruisers Condor and Cormoran. Gneisenau then visited Souda Bay, Crete from 16 November to 20 December, followed by Smyrna for three weeks. On 18 January 1895, she began the voyage back to Germany, arriving in Kiel on 27 March.

==== 1895–1900 ====
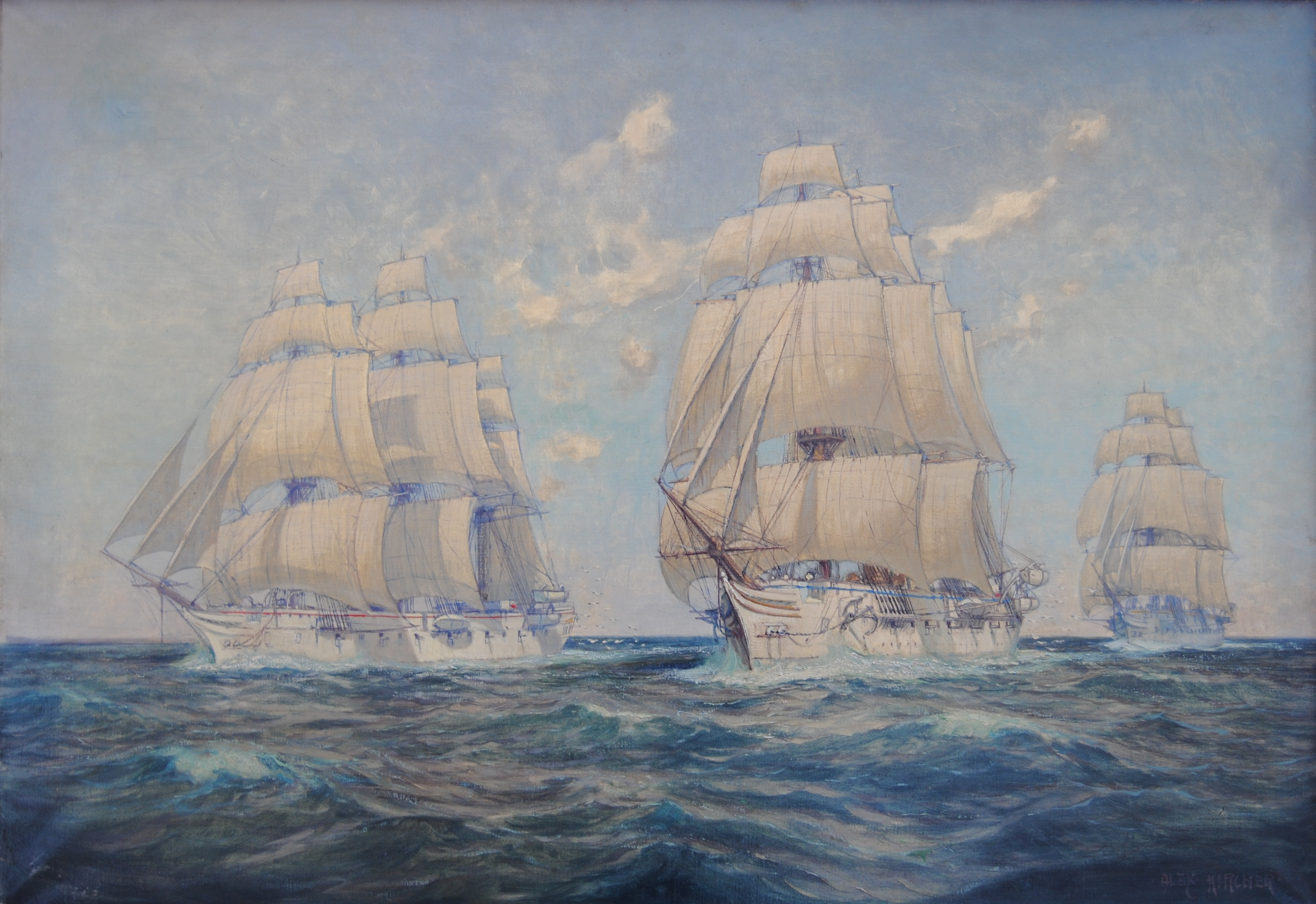
A painting of Gneisenau, Stein, and Stosch under sail, by Alexander Kircher

The next set of training exercises began on 6 May, and were conducted in the North Sea and concluded with ceremonies marking the opening of the Kaiser Wilhelm Canal. On 21 June, Gneisenau joined the newly formed IV Division in the Kieler Förde, at the Baltic entrance to the canal, where the ships' bands played the national anthems of each countries' warships as they arrived for the celebration. Gneisenau cruised alone in the North Sea in July, and on 14 August joined III Division for the fleet maneuvers, which concluded on 17 September. During the exercises, Gneisenau collided with the Danish schooner Delphin off Horns Rev on 24 August, and could save only three men from her crew before the latter sank. On 28 September she embarked on the annual winter cruise, which again went to the West Indies. While in Charlotte Amalie, Gneisenau and the Danish gunboat Fyen helped to suppress a major fire in the port. She visited Havana, Cuba on 21 January 1896, where she, Stosch, and Stein monitored the civil unrest on the island. On 7 February, Gneisenau left Cuban waters and arrived back in Kiel on 18 March. Gneisenau departed Kiel on 15 May, bound for Bergen for a training cruise. While in Norway, Gneisenau was visited by the German imperial family on 19 June and by King Oscar II of Sweden and Norway on 14 July. She returned to Kiel on 18 July, where she prepared for the annual fleet maneuvers in August and September.

On 2 October, Gneisenau began the winter cruise to the Mediterranean, where she visited numerous foreign ports. She initially joined Stein for the return voyage to Germany in early 1897, but while en route Gneisenau was ordered to Tangier to enforce German claims for compensation for a German banker who had been murdered in the country in December 1896. She arrived there on 27 February 1897, and was able to leave on 2 March, her mission having been accomplished in that time. After arriving in Kiel on 25 March, she went into drydock on 4 April for an overhaul, which was completed by mid-May; on 17 May, she began another training cruise in the Baltic. The ship began another major overseas cruise on 16 August, rather than participate in the annual fleet exercises. This trip went to South America, and included stops in Rio de Janeiro and São Francisco do Sul in Brazil, and Havana, where she rendezvoused with the training cruiser Charlotte. On 1 March 1898, Gneisenau left Havana to return to Germany, stopping in Key West and Horta on the way back. Heavy storms in the North Sea forced her to put into Den Helder in the Netherlands on 27 March. She reached Kiel three days later, where she was decommissioned on 18 April for another overhaul.

She remained out of service for the next year, before being recommissioned on 9 April 1899, thereafter embarking on a training cruise to Bergen on 5 July. On 24 July, she began another training voyage that went first to Iceland and then Queenstown, Ireland before continuing on to the Mediterranean. Foreign ports that were visited included Jaffa from 16 to 20 December and Beirut from 20 December to 2 January 1900. She began the journey back to Germany on 5 January, departing Port Said and sailing to La Spezia, Italy, where she was visited by Kaiserin Friedrich and her daughter Princess Viktoria. Gneisenau arrived in Kiel on 23 March, and after minor repairs began a training cruise in the Baltic on 26 May. Another short visit to Bergen followed on 10 September.

==== Loss ====
Gneisenau wrecked alongside the mole in Málaga

On 18 September, she left Kiel once again for another overseas cruise, stopping in Dartmouth on the way through the English Channel. She toured ports in Spain, Portugal, and Morocco, stopping in Málaga on 13 November, where she remained for nearly a month. On 10 December, she left the port to begin shooting exercises; she moored off the mole, some 800 to 900 m (2,600 to 3,000 ft) from shore, where the exercises were held. At around 10:30 on 16 December, the weather off Málaga worsened considerably, with force 8 winds. The ship's commander, KzS Kretschmann, ordered the crew to raise steam in the boilers so the ship could be moved into the safety of the harbor, and thirty minutes later a miscommunication between the engine room personnel and the captain led to Kretschmann ordering the anchors raised so the ship could get underway. The commander believed the engine room had reported 50 revolutions per minute (rpm) on the propeller shaft, but the actual figure was 15 rpm, not sufficient to propel the ship. As a result, the now-unmoored ship drifted helplessly in the heavy winds.

The crew attempted to drop the starboard anchor, but it did not catch in the stony ground. Gneisenau was driven into the mole repeatedly, striking it with her stern twice before being turned and pushed bow-first on the starboard side, forcing her aground. A merchant ship attempted to come to the crew's aid, but they were unable to connect a line between the two ships before Gneisenau began to list 35 degrees. A boat from shore also attempted to rescue the crew, but it too was forced ashore in the heavy seas. Wave action quickly smashed Gneisenau's hull against the mole, and part of her crew attempted to find safety by climbing the rigging. The ship rolled over onto her side, and the surviving crewmen reached shore with a line. Forty-one men were killed in the accident, including Kretschmann and the ship's first officer. Charlotte and the British ironclad HMS Devastation were sent to aid the wounded. Those killed in the sinking were buried in Málaga's cemetery, and the survivors returned to Germany aboard the HAPAG steamship SS Andalusia on 2 January 1901.

The equipment director from the Kaiserliche Werft of Wilhelmshaven, KK Otto Mandt, surveyed the wreck to determine if it could be salvaged, but he determined that it was too badly damaged. Instead, the guns and other valuable equipment were removed and the wreck was blown up to test the strength of the hull's construction. The remains of the ship were then sold for scrap, to be broken up in situ.
