= SMS Möwe (1879) =

German gunboat of the 1870s

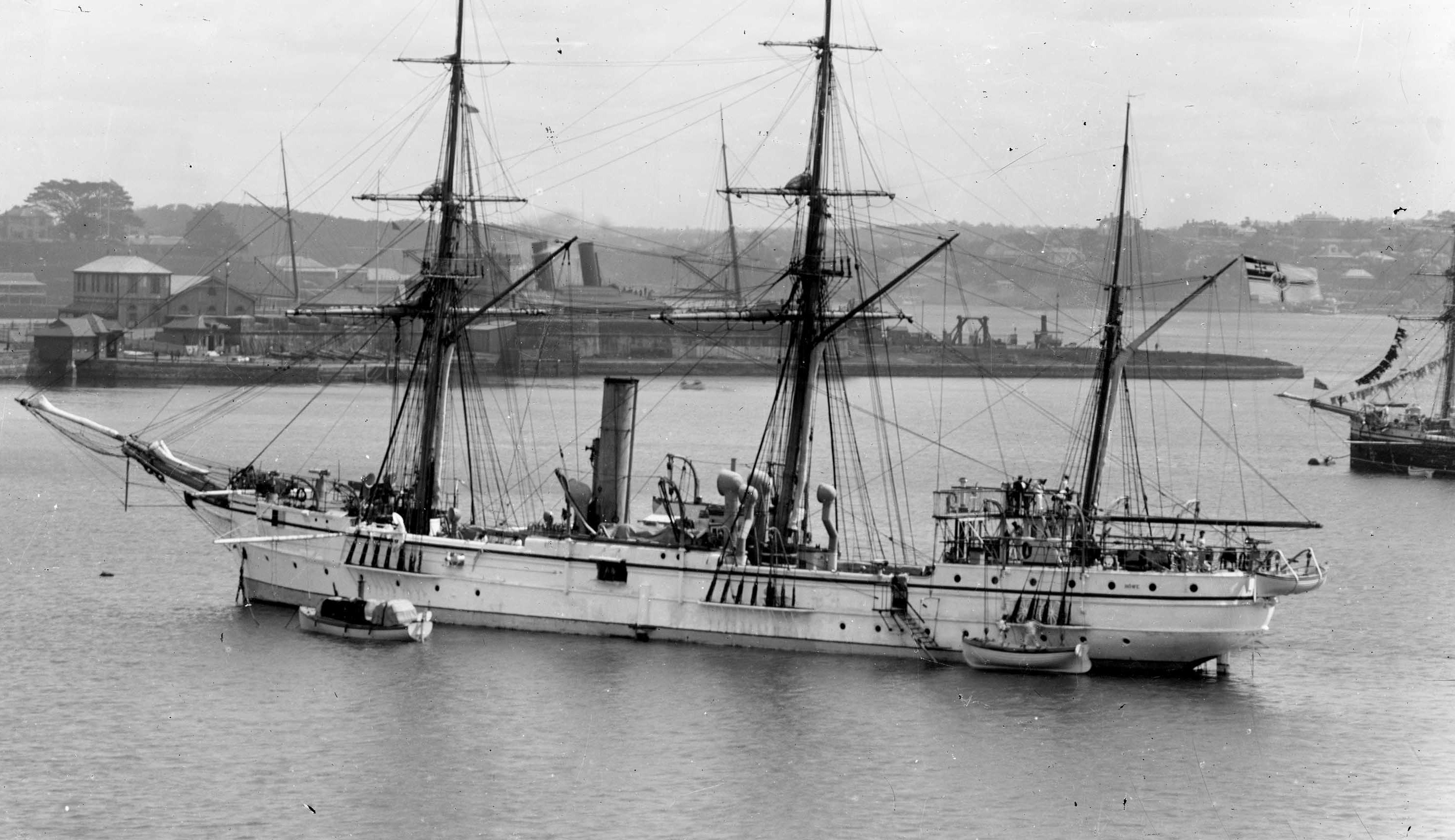
- SMS Möwe in Sydney, Australia

History

German Empire
- Name: Möwe (Seagull)
- Operator: Imperial German Navy
- Builder: Schichau-Werke, Elbing
- Laid down: 1878
- Launched: 8 October 1879
- Commissioned: 31 May 1880
- Decommissioned: 29 October 1905
- Stricken: 9 December 1905
- Fate: Sold 1910, broken up

General characteristics
- Class & type: Habicht-class gunboat
- Displacement: Design: 840 t (830 long tons); Full load: 1,005 t (989 long tons)
- Length: 59.2 m (194 ft 3 in)
- Beam: 8.9 m (29 ft 2 in)
- Draft: 3.52 m (11 ft 7 in)
- Installed power: 2 × fire-tube boilers; 600 PS (590 ihp)
- Propulsion: 1 × double-expansion steam engine; 1 × screw propeller
- Speed: 11 knots (20 km/h; 13 mph)
- Range: 2,010 nmi (3,720 km; 2,310 mi) at 9 kn (17 km/h; 10 mph)
- Complement: 6–7 officers; 121–126 enlisted men
- Armament: 1 × 15 cm (5.9 in) gun; 4 × 12 cm (4.7 in) guns

SMS Möwe (Seagull) was the second member of the Habicht class of steam gunboats built for the German Kaiserliche Marine (Imperial Navy) in the late 1870s. Intended to serve abroad, the ship was ordered as part of a construction program intended to modernize Germany's fleet of cruising vessels in the mid-1870s. The Habicht class was armed with a battery of five guns, and was the first class of German gunboat to use compound steam engines. The ship had a top speed of 11 knots (20 km/h; 13 mph).

Möwe embarked on three major overseas cruises during her career, the first two as a frontline combat vessel. The first, from 1880 to 1882, took the ship to the South Pacific. On the way home, she was diverted to Egypt in response to the Anglo-Egyptian War to protect Germans and other foreign nationals in the country. A second major deployment followed, this time to Africa, which lasted from 1884 to 1889. Möwe was involved in the establishment of the German colonial empire in German West Africa, carrying the imperial commissioner, Gustav Nachtigal, to establish formal colonial treaties in Togoland and Kamerun. Nachtigal died from malaria while aboard Möwe in 1885. Later that year, the ship moved to German East Africa, where she assisted in the suppression of the Abushiri revolt in 1888.

After returning to Germany in 1889, Möwe was converted into a survey ship, and in that guise she began her final overseas voyage in 1890. She initially sailed to German East Africa and worked off the coast for the next four years. In 1894, she moved to the South Pacific to begin surveying the colonies in German New Guinea, Micronesia, and Melanesia. Worn out and unable to make the voyage back to Germany by 1905, she instead sailed to the German naval base in Qingdao, China, where she was hulked. In 1910, she was sold and subsequently broken up.

== Design ==
By the mid-1870s, the large screw frigates and screw corvettes that formed the backbone of the German cruiser force were beginning to need to be replaced. Some of these ships had been in service for twenty years, and in that time spent considerable periods on deployments overseas. To replace these older vessels, the German Kaiserliche Marine (Imperial Navy) ordered the six Carola-class corvettes and three Habicht-class steam gunboats. The three gunboats were the first vessels of the type to use compound steam engines, which increased speed and engine efficiency.

Möwe was 59.2 meters (194 ft 3 in) long overall, with a beam of 8.9 m (29 ft 2 in) and a draft of 3.52 m (11 ft 7 in) forward. She displaced 840 metric tons (830 long tons) as designed and 1,005 t (989 long tons) at full load. The ship's crew consisted of 6–7 officers and 121–126 enlisted men. She was powered by a double-expansion steam engine that drove a 2-bladed screw propeller, with steam provided by two coal-fired, cylindrical fire-tube boilers. Her propulsion system was rated to produce a top speed of 11 knots (20 km/h; 13 mph) at 600 metric horsepower (590 ihp), but she reached 11.7 knots (21.7 km/h; 13.5 mph) in service. At a cruising speed of 9 knots (17 km/h; 10 mph), she could steam for 2,010 nautical miles (3,720 km; 2,310 mi). To supplement the steam engine on long voyages, the ships were fitted with a schooner sailing rig. While cruising under sail, the screw could be raised.

The ship was armed with a single 15 cm (5.9 in) RK L/22 built-up gun, which supplied from a magazine with 115 shells. She also carried four 12 cm (4.7 in) K L/23 built-up guns, which were supplied with a total of 440 rounds of ammunition. After 1882, the ship's armament had been standardized on a uniform battery of five 12.5 cm (4.9 in) K L/23 built up guns and five 37 mm (1.5 in) Hotchkiss revolver cannon. In 1889, two of the 12.5 cm guns were removed.

== Service history ==
=== Construction and first overseas deployment, 1880–1882 ===
Illustration of Möwe in the South Pacific

Möwe laid down at the Schichau-Werke shipyard in Elbing in 1878 under the contract designation "C", (Note: German warships were ordered under provisional names. Additions to the fleet were given a single letter; ships intended to replace older or lost vessels were ordered as "Ersatz (name of the ship to be replaced)".) and was launched on 8 October 1879. Work on the ship was completed at Danzig the following year, and she was commissioned on 31 May 1880 to be moved to Kiel, under the command of Korvettenkapitän (KK—Corvette Captain) Franz von Kyckbusch. There, her guns were installed between 10 and 28 June. She then completed a short period of sea trials, and following their conclusion, she was decommissioned on 17 July. Her time out of service proved to be brief, as on 1 October, Möwe was recommissioned to join her sister ship Habicht in the Australian Station. She was again captained by Kyckbusch. The ship sailed from Kiel on 17 October, and on 28 October 1880, Möwe was driven into the British schooner Rescue at Plymouth, Devon, United Kingdom. The schooner was severely damaged at the bow. Möwe lost her bowsprit and topsail yard. Möwe continued on south through the Atlantic, stopping in Funchal, Madiera, and then Rio de Janeiro, Brazil, on the way. She arrived in Cape Town, South Africa, on 2 January 1881. There, she met Habicht and the two vessels sailed together the rest of the way to Melbourne, Australia.

Möwe stayed in Melbourne to represent Germany at the Melbourne International Exhibition and left on 24 March, bound for Apia in Samoa. She anchored there on 29 April; Möwe and Habicht replaced the previous station ships, the gunboats Nautilus and Hyäne. Möwe remained in Samoa through mid-October, when she sailed south to Sydney, Australia, so her crew could be sent home and their replacements embarked, though Kyckbusch remained in command of the ship. On 21 January 1882, she sailed back north to Samoa, which she reached on 2 March. The screw corvette Carola arrived in Apia on 18 April to replace Möwe as the station ship there, allowing her to return home. But on the way, her orders were changed, redirecting her to Ottoman Egypt, where tensions between Britain and the Khedivate of Egypt had grown dangerously high. Concerns for the safety of foreigners in the country prompted the collection of warships in the eastern Mediterranean Sea, and Möwe joined the German contingent, which also included the corvette Gneisenau, Habicht, and the gunboat Cyclop.

Möwe sent a landing party of twenty-five men ashore in Port Said on 7 July to defend the German consulate there. She remained in the area around the Suez Canal through the end of September. During this period, she sailed to Ismailia in the canal and embarked around 150 German, Austro-Hungarian, Italian, and French nationals and evacuated them to Port Said. Möwe also escorted convoys of merchant ships in the area during the fighting. On 24 September, the ship left Egypt for home, arriving in Kiel on 1 November. She was decommissioned there four days later for an overhaul that would begin in 1883, which included replacement of the ship's armament. The crew's experience during the voyage in the south Pacific had demonstrated that the 15 cm gun was unnecessary, and that lighter, faster-firing weapons were preferable.

=== Second overseas deployment, 1884–1889 ===
==== West African operations ====
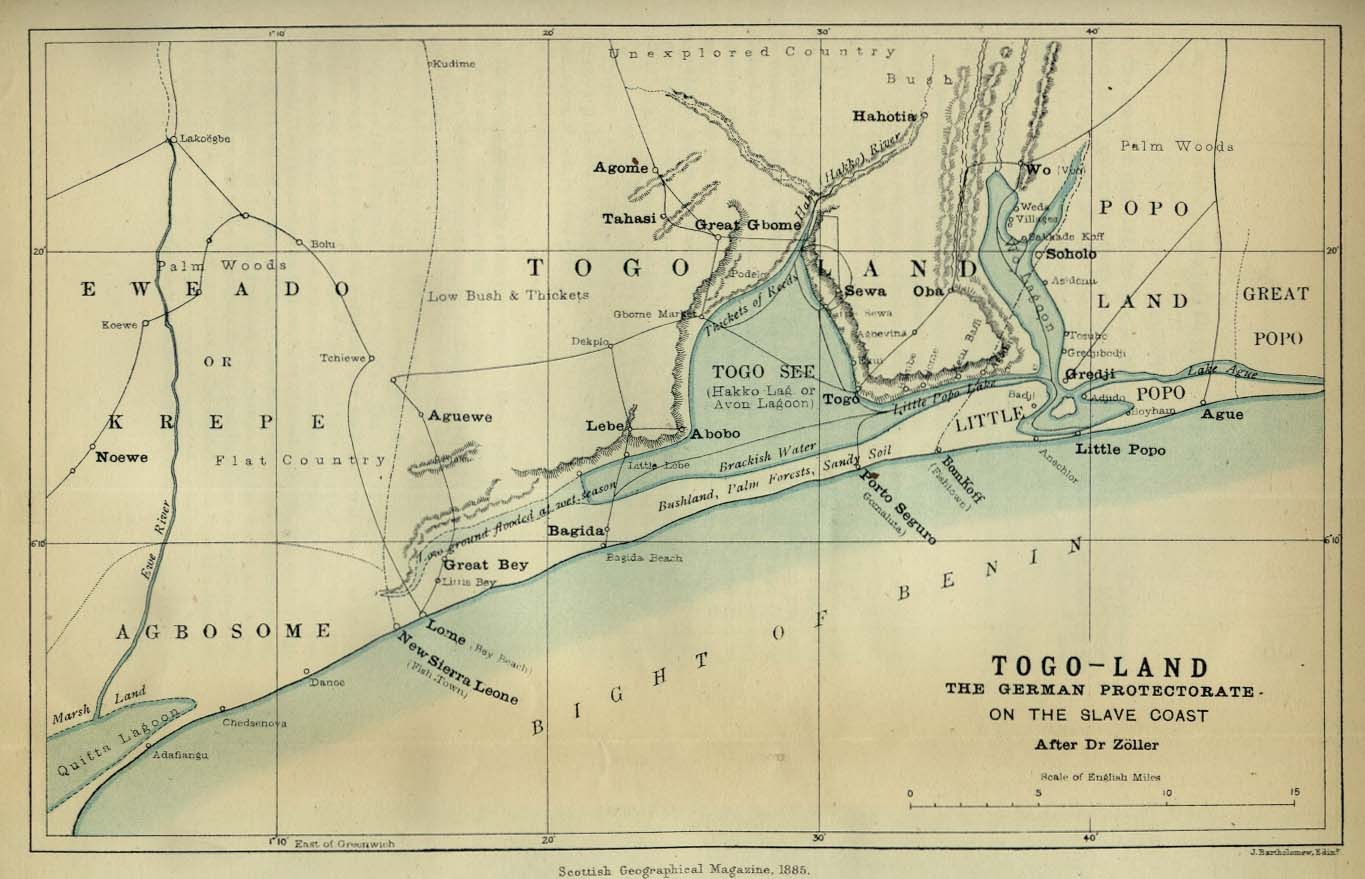
Map of Togoland in 1885

Möwe was recommissioned for another tour abroad on 1 April 1884, this time to western Africa. Her captain at that time was KK Paul Hoffmann. Beginning in 1880, German trading companies had moved operations from British West Africa to the so-called Slave Coast, as these areas were not yet subjected to European colonial rule and customs duties were more favorable. The German intrusion led to violent reactions from the local residents, and encouraged power struggles between rival leaders. The German corvette Sophie attempted to suppress the fighting in early 1884, and arrested three of the leaders. The Germans brought them back to Germany to impress on them the scale of the German Empire. Möwe was to embark the three captives and return them to Africa. In addition, Hoffmann was ordered to support the activities of Gustav Nachtigal, a renowned explorer of Africa, who had been designated as the imperial commissioner for Germany's colonial empire. Nachtigal was to establish the first German protectorates in what would become German West Africa.

The ship sailed from Kiel on 15 April and stopped in Lisbon, Portugal, on 3 May. There, she embarked Nachtigal and his partner, Maximilian Buchner, before departing on 19 May. The ship stopped briefly to show the flag in Tangier on 26 May and then continued on to the Cape Verde islands, arriving there on 9 June. There, she met the screw frigate SMS Elisabeth, and the two ships sailed together to the Los Islands off the coast of West Africa. While there, the Germans negotiated agreements with local chiefs over German trading posts on the islands. An outbreak of fever forced Möwe to leave earlier than planned, and she sailed on to Freetown in British Sierra Leone and then Monrovia, Liberia, before reaching the Gulf of Guinea. She initially stopped in Klein Popo, in the recently acquired protectorate of Togoland, where the three African captives were released. On 4 July, Nachtigal negotiated a formal protection agreement in Baguida, followed by a similar agreement in Lomé. German flags were raised in the cities to mark the establishment of German authority. Nachtigal also claimed Klein Popo and Ouidah for Germany, but soon abandoned them over conflicting claims with France.

Map of Germany's colonial empire in Africa; Möwe was instrumental in securing control of three of the four colonies

Möwe sailed east to Douala, at the mouth of the Wouri River, arriving there on 12 July. German trading companies operating in the area had requested that Germany formally colonize the country, and Chancellor Otto von Bismarck eventually approved the proposal. Accordingly, on 14 July, Nachtigal secured protection treaties with the rulers of Douala, Deido, and Akwa. Buchner became the imperial commissioner for the colony of Kamerun, which was to initially comprise the coastal area along the Bay of Biafra, between the Niger River delta and Gabon. Möwe toured the rea, raising the German flag in several towns, including Bimbia, Malimba, Kribi, Klein Batanga, and Benito. German claims encroached on French interests in neighboring French Gabon led to negotiations in Libreville, Gabon, on 10 August where Nachtigal agreed with withdraw from Benito. Möwe sailed there on 18 August to remove the German flag.

With the international borders thus clarified, Nachtigal boarded Möwe and continued south on 9 September. On 4 October, the ship stopped at the southern border of Portuguese Angola, where Nachtigal directed the construction of a border guard post at the Kunene River; Nachtigal intended to claim the land to the south of Angola for Germany. Three days later, the ship anchored in Lüderitz Bay, where Nachtigal disembarked to travel inland and negotiate protection treaties with rulers further inland. Möwe sailed on without him, bound for Cape Town, where she underwent an overhaul and her crew was given time to rest. Nachtigal arrived back at the ship on 20 November, and Möwe traveled back north to Walvis Bay. There, Nachtigal met with British colonial authorities for negotiations of the borders of the newly created German South West Africa. Möwe then sailed back north to Kamerun, stopping at the mouth of the Kunene on 27 November on the way.

While Möwe had been away from Kamerun, significant unrest had broken out in the colony at the instigation of British consuls and naval officers. The German Admiralty organized the West African Squadron, led by the screw corvette Bismarck and commanded by Konteradmiral (Rear Admiral) Eduard Knorr. The ships arrived in Kamerun on 17 December, shortly before Möwe reached the colony on 31 December. In January 1885, Möwe sailed initially to Bimbia and then Victoria to support efforts to restore order in the colony. In late January, the ship moved to Togoland, where unrest against German rule had also broken out. German authorities quickly arrested the leaders of the rebellion, allowing Möwe to return to Kamerun on 10 February. Nachtigal returned to the ship on 22 February, sailing for Libreville for further discussions on border arrangements with the French. From there, the ship sailed to Lagos for border negotiations with authorities in British Nigeria related to German claims on Mahinland. Möwe was present for the raising of the German flag there later. On 21 March, after having returned to Kamerun, Möwe hosted a negotiated settlement between rival chiefs off Douala.

Habicht arrived in Kamerun on 21 March to relieve Möwe; the latter was to be transferred to German East Africa. But first, she sailed with Nachtigal aboard to the mouth of the Rio del Rey. On the way, Nachtigal became very ill with malaria, so Möwe turned westward, in an attempt to take him to cooler climates. While the ship cruised off Cape Palmas on 20 April, Nachtigal died. Because there was no way to return his body to Germany, he was buried there the next day (though his remains were later moved to Kamerun in 1888). The ship stayed in Cape Verde from 4 to 12 May before proceeding north and entering the Mediterranean Sea. She underwent an overhaul while there (the location of which was not recorded), before continuing on through the Suez Canal to the Indian Ocean.

==== East African operations ====
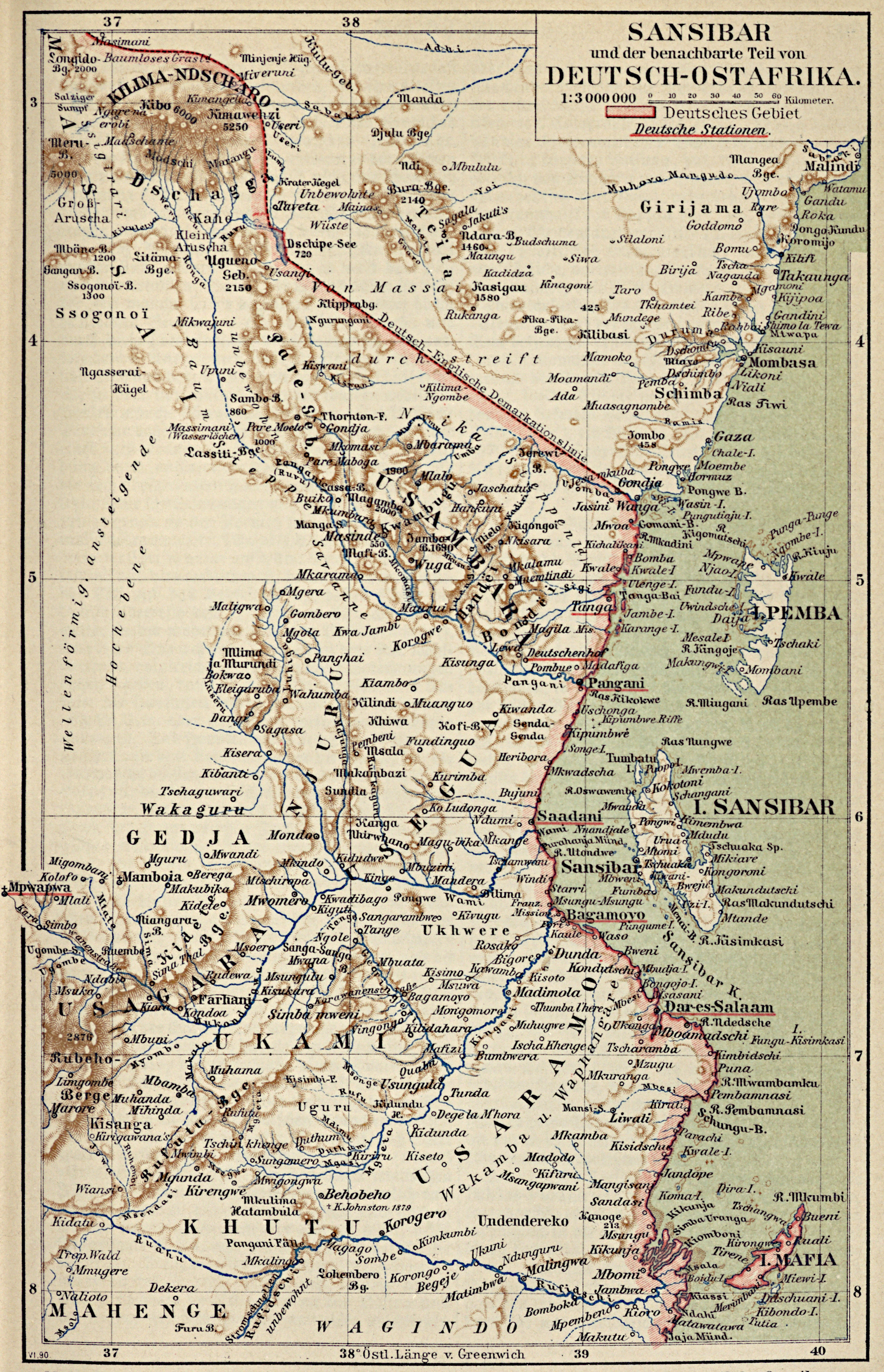
Map of German East Africa from c. 1890

Möwe arrived off Zanzibar on 17 August to join the cruiser squadron being assembled there, initially under the command of Kommodore Carl Paschen. Two days later, Knorr arrived aboard Bismarck and assumed control of the unit. Tensions in the area soon calmed, and on 9 January 1886, Knorr took the bulk of the squadron to the South Pacific, leaving b behind only Möwe and Hyäne to patrol the colony. The two vessels cruised off the coast for the first half of the year, and then they sailed to Aden in early July. At that time, KK Oscar Boeters arrived to relieve Hoffmann after more than two years in command abroad. From Aden, the ships sailed to visit the coast of Somalia. Later that year, Möwe sailed to Bombay, British India, for an overhaul and to give her crew time to recover from the malaria that afflicted many of the men. The ship arrived back in East Africa on 16 November. Political tensions had increased by that time, prompting the return of the cruiser squadron on 12 December, though they soon departed, however.

In the second half of January 1887, Möwe examined the coastline from Kismayo in southern Somalia to Tanga in German East Africa; she remained at the latter port until early March. Soon thereafter, a transport ship arrived, carrying a battery of six embellished field guns that Kaiser Wilhelm I presented as a gift to Barghash bin Said of Zanzibar, and Möwe escorted the ship to Zanzibar. On 18 March, Boeters and the German consul presented the gifts to bin Said. On 1 June, Hyäne sailed for home, leaving Möwe as the only warship in the colony until the arrival of Nautiulus on 15 August. In that time, Möwe toured the region, sailing as far as Victoria in the Seychelles. In September, she made another trip to Aden. The ship spend the second half of November in Zanzibar, and on 8 December, she sailed for Cape Town for an overhaul and to replace her crew. She arrived back in East Africa on 19 April 1888.

In mid-1888, the Abushiri revolt broke out in German East Africa, and the cruiser squadron returned to the colony again on 19 July. In response to unrest in Tanga, Möwe shelled rebels there and sent her landing party ashore to disperse the on 5 August. The ship was sent to Pangani to attack a group of rebels there on 17 August, but by the time she arrived, the situation had calmed there. On 8 September, she returned to Tanga to again attack rebels in the town. A planned assault on Kilwa Kivinje on 21 September was cancelled after the Germans realized that the number of rebels significantly outnumbered Möwe's landing party. The ship thereafter sailed to Dar es Salaam to strengthen the town's defenses, remaining there through December. The Germans thereafter began a blockade of the coast; Möwe was responsible for the section between Dar es Salaam and Mafia Island.

A fever epidemic broke out during this period, and many of the crew were afflicted, including the captain and executive officer. The former, KK Erhardt, turned over command to the latter in September, who was in turn replaced by KK Theodor Heinrich Riedel in December. On 11 and 12 January 1889, German forces in Dar es Salaam, which included a landing party from Möwe, came under heavy attack from the rebels. The ship provided gunfire support, which helped defeat the assault. By early June, the Germans lifted the blockade, though heavy fighting continued into the following month. On 13 August, Möwe was detached from the squadron, and the other warships transferred a large number of sick crewmen to be taken to Germany. Möwe arrived in Kiel on 16 October and she was decommissioned there on 1 November for an overhaul and modernization. In the course of the fighting in German East Africa, the ship's crew had captured a pair of field guns from the rebel forces, and these were handed over to the Marinestation der Ostsee (Baltic Sea Naval Station).

=== Later career ===
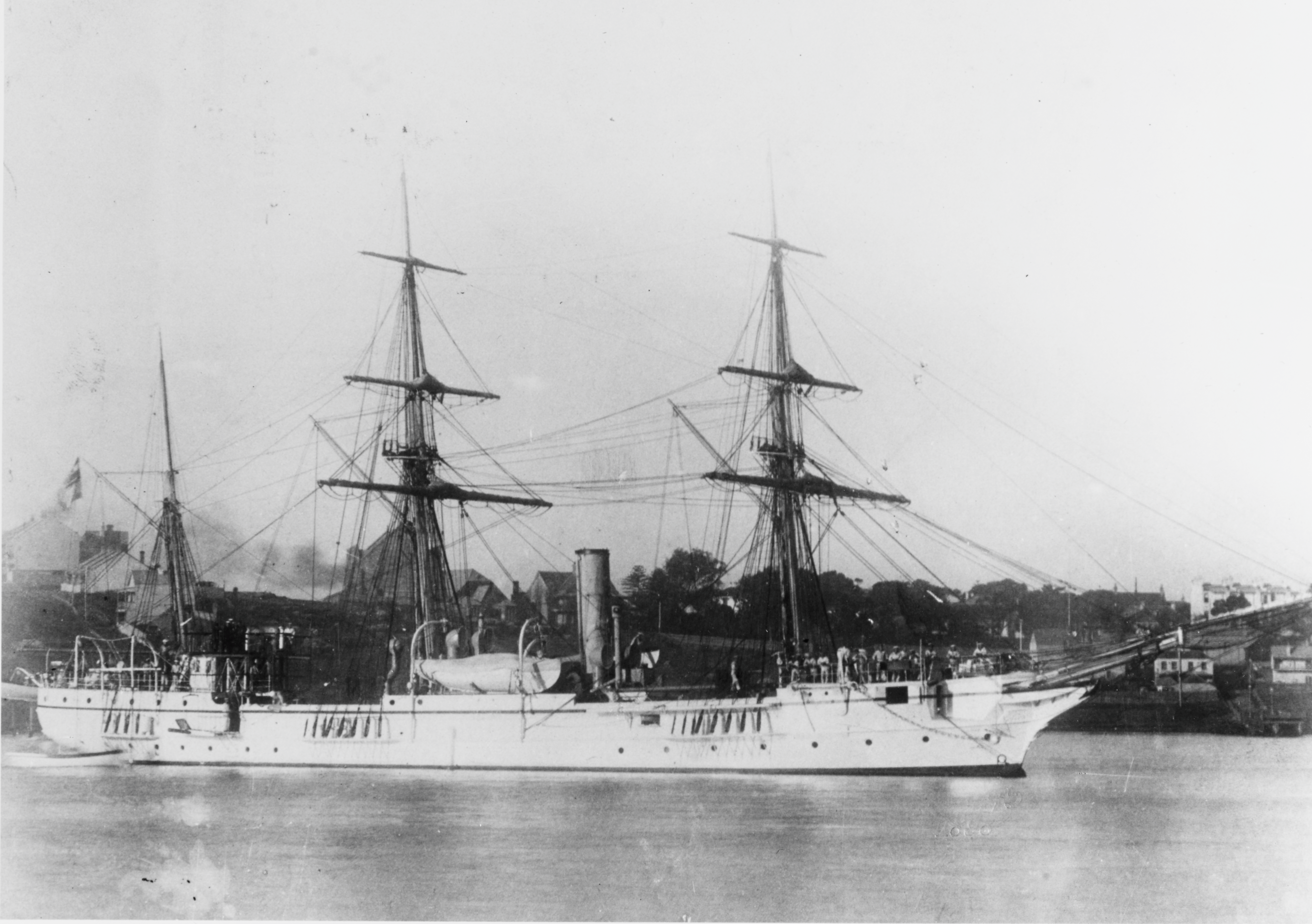
Möwe in Kiel, c. 1898

During the overhaul conducted at the Kaiserliche Werft (Imperial Shipyard) in Kiel, the ship's hull was found to be in good condition. The navy accordingly decided to convert Möwe into a survey ship; two of her guns were removed and her sailing rig was altered to incorporate topsails. A small deck house was erected aft. The ship recommissioned on 1 November 1890; ten days later, she sailed from Germany, bound once again for the coast of German East Africa. Over the following four years, the ship conducted extensive surveys of the coast. Every year, she sailed to Bombay for an overhaul and to rest the crew. The ship saw little combat during this period; in June and July 1892, she assisted in the suppression of unrest in the Kilimanjaro area. And in September 1894, she joined the unprotected cruiser Schwalbe to repel attacks on Kilwa Kivinje. In November, KK Walther Faber took command of the ship.

Möwe left East Africa on 15 December 1894, bound for the South Pacific. At that time, Germany only possessed relatively modern maps of the region from the Gazelle expedition that had been carried out between 1874 and 1876. Beyond that, naval and merchant vessels largely relied on 17th and 18th century maps from British and French explorers, and these were not sufficient. Möwe's operations in the region marked the beginning of a decades-long project to map some 240,000 km^{2} (93,000 sq mi) of territory that covered the German colonial empire in the Pacific, which included Kaiser-Wilhelmsland, the Bismarck Archipelago, German Samoa, and several Melanesian and Micronesian islands.

The ship sailed to Sydney for an overhaul that began on 11 March 1895. While there, she took aboard Dr. Hayn from the Leipzig Observatory to conduct astronomical work during the survey process. Möwe left Sydney on 15 June and sailed north to begin survey work. Over the following years, the ship's activities were routinely interrupted by annual overhauls, which were conducted either at Sydney or Hong Kong. Additionally, the tropical climate necessitated frequent breaks in cooler areas. And local populations occasionally proved hostile to the crew's presence. Later in 1895, while exploring Kaiser-Wilhelmsland, the crew discovered the body of the explorer Otto Ehrenfried Ehlers, who had died during an expedition on the island. The same year, Möwe discovered a bay previously unknown to Europeans, which the crew named "Möwe Harbor". Kapitänleutnant (KL—Captain Lieutenant) Georg Janke took command of the ship in September 1895.

In February 1897, KK Johannes Merten relieved Janke as the ship's captain. During mapping work near Berlinhafen (near modern Aitape) on 12 April on the northern coast of Kaiser-Wilhelmsland, the survey detachment was attacked by locals, and several were injured. In early 1899, locals on the island of Bougainville killed the captain of a German merchant vessel, which prompted Möwe to bring a police unit to the island to find the perpetrators. In 1900, the ship embarked Rudolf von Bennigsen, the colonial governor, and Robert Koch, a scientist conducting research on malaria in the South Pacific, and took them on a cruise from 28 June to 10 July that included visits to French-controlled islands in the region. Unrest in the Admiralty Islands and on the St Matthias Islands in 1900 prompted Möwe to join operations to suppress the rebels. These operations lasted into 1901. During this period, in December 1900, KK Carl Schönfelder arrived to take command of the ship. He was relieved by KL Karl Seiferling in December 1901.

KL Ulrich Lübbert arrived in December 1904 to take command of the ship; he was to be her last commander. The crew celebrated the ship's 25th year in service on 31 May 1905. The ship was worn out by that time, however, and in August, her replacement—the survey ship SMS Planet—arrived to replace her. It was not feasible for Möwe to make the voyage back to Germany, so she departed Matupi Harbor on 14 August, bound for the German naval base at Qingdao, China. She was decommissioned there on 29 October, and struck from the naval register on 9 December. The ship was used as a hulk until 1910, when she was sold. Though Möwe is commonly stated to have been sunk during the Siege of Tsingtao in World War I, she was instead broken up.
