= Gottlob Krause =

German Africanist and linguist

Gottlob Adolf Krause (January 5, 1850 in Ockrilla near Meissen – February 19, 1938 in Zürich) was a German Africanist and linguist.

== Research ==
Krause researched languages of Central and West Africa, and is credited with labeling the Kwa languages.

== Political Beliefs ==
Krause was an anti-colonialist, and did not cooperate with the German Empire's goals of imposing colonies in Africa. Akinwumi cites this as the reason for which Krause's scientific reputation was undermined in Germany.

== Works ==
- Ein Beitrag zur Kenntnis der fulischen Sprache in Afrika. In: Mitteilungen der Riebeckschen Nigerexpedition (1884),
- Proben der Sprache von Ghat in der Sahara (Leipzig, 1884).
- Die Musuksprache in Centralafrika. In: Veröffentlichungen der Wiener Akademie. Wien (1886),
- Beitrag zur Kenntnis des Klimas von Salaga, Togo und der Goldküste. Abhandlungen der Kaiserlichen Leopoldinisch-Carolinischen Deutschen Akademie der Naturforscher (Halle/Saale), 93 (3) (1910), pp. 193–472.
