= Freya (disambiguation) =

Freya, or Freyja, is a goddess in Norse mythology.

Freya may refer to:

== Music and performers ==
- Freya (band), an American metal/hardcore band
- "Freya" (song), a song by The Sword from the 2006 album Age of Winters
- Jo Freya, British singer

== Other people ==
- Freya (given name), a feminine given name derived from the name of the Norse goddess

== Plants and animals ==
- Freya (plant), a genus in the daisy family
- Freya (cat), owned by George Osborne, British Chancellor of the Exchequer
- Freya (spider), a genus of jumping spiders
- Freya (walrus), walrus euthanized in 2022

== Fiction ==
- Freya (character), a Marvel Comics character
- Freya Crescent, a character in the video game Final Fantasy IX
- Freya, a character in the anime television series Saint Seiya
- Freya, a character in the manga series Chobits

== Ships ==
- SMS Freya, two vessels of the German Imperial Navy
- UC1 Freya, a private Danish submarine
- Freya, former name of the schooner American Spirit

== Mountains ==
- Mount Freya, Victoria Land, Antarctica
- Freya Peak, in the Baffin Mountains, Baffin Island, Canada

== Other subjects ==
- Freya radar, a German World War II radar
- Freya, third stable version of elementary OS, a Linux distribution
- Freya, a brand of large-bust and full-figure lingerie manufactured by Wacoal
- Freya (missile system), a pan-European anti-ballistic missile defense project

== See also ==
- Freia (disambiguation)
- Freja (disambiguation)
- Freyja (disambiguation)
