= American Spirit =

American Spirit may refer to:

- American Spirit (album), a Mannheim Steamroller album
- American Spirit (schooner), a schooner
- American Spirit (ship), a small cruise ship
- Natural American Spirit, a tobacco brand
- The American Spirit, a 2017 book written by David McCullough

== See also ==
- American Spirit Foundation
- American Spirit Honor Medal
