= Leipzig-class corvette =

Screw corvette class of the German Imperial Navy

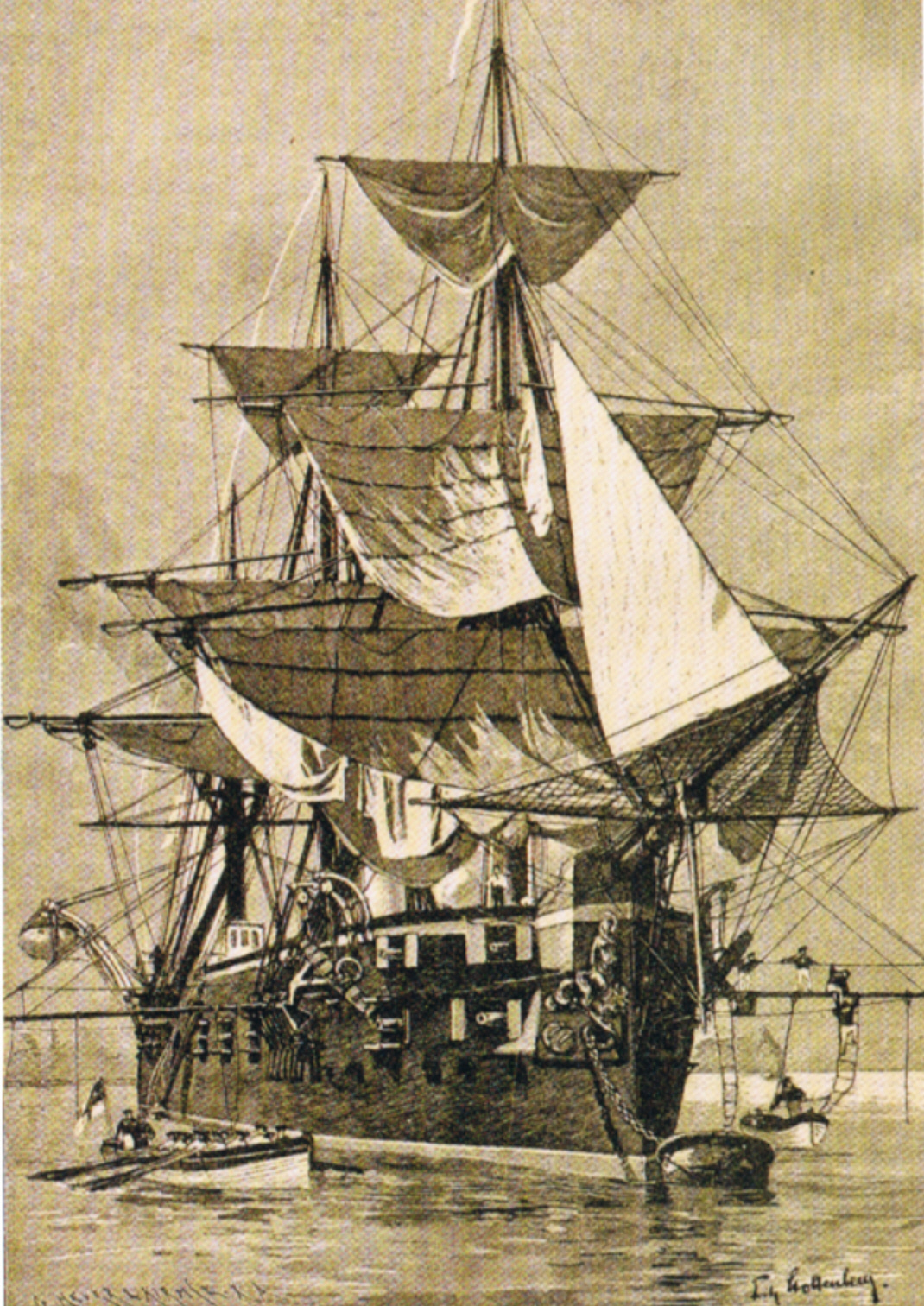
- Illustration of Leipzig by Fritz Stoltenberg

Class overview
- Builders: AG Vulcan, Stettin
- Preceded by: Ariadne-class corvette
- Succeeded by: Bismarck-class corvette
- Built: 1875–1877
- In service: 1877–1894
- Completed: 2
- Scrapped: 2

General characteristics
- Type: Screw corvette
- Displacement: Full load: 4,626 metric tons (4,553 long tons)
- Length: 87.5 m (287 ft 1 in) (loa)
- Beam: 14 m (45 ft 11 in)
- Draft: 6.2 m (20 ft 4 in)
- Installed power: 10 × fire-tube boilers (Leipzig); 6 × fire tube boilers (Prinz Adalbert); 6,050 metric horsepower (5,970 ihp)
- Propulsion: 1 × marine steam engine; 1 × screw propeller
- Sail plan: Full ship rig
- Speed: 15.8 knots (29.3 km/h; 18.2 mph)
- Range: 2,330 nautical miles (4,320 km; 2,680 mi) at 10 kn (19 km/h; 12 mph)
- Crew: 39 officers; 386 sailors
- Armament: 2 × 17 cm (6.7 in) RK L/25 guns; 10 × 17 cm RK L/20 guns

The Leipzig class was a group of two screw corvettes built for the German Kaiserliche Marine (Imperial Navy) in the 1870s. The two ships of the class were Leipzig and Prinz Adalbert; Prinz Adalbert was originally named Sedan after the Battle of Sedan, but was renamed shortly after entering service to avoid angering France. They were based on the earlier corvette Freya, but were significantly larger, carried a stronger armament, and unlike the wooden-hulled Ariadne-class corvettes, adopted iron construction, making them the first corvettes of the German fleet to be built with iron. Originally intended to serve abroad and with the fleet, British experiences during the Battle of Pacocha in 1877 convinced the German naval command that unarmored warships were useless against the fleets of ironclads being built by the European navies, and so Leipzig and Prinz Adalbert would be used only on foreign stations.

The ships went on two cruises each in the late 1870s and early 1880s, primarily to East Asia. In 1878, Leipzig was involved with a diplomatic dispute with Nicaragua. Prinz Adalbert was used to secure Germany's growing colonial empire in Africa. In the mid-1880s, Leipzig was heavily rebuilt to allow her use as a squadron flagship on foreign stations. She served abroad in this capacity from 1888 to 1893; during this extended deployment, she participated in the campaign to suppress the Abushiri revolt in German East Africa in 1888–1890. She then alternated between East Africa, China, and Chile, where she protected German nationals during the Chilean Civil War of 1891. In the meantime, Prinz Adalbert had been converted into a training ship in 1886, and served in that role for three years, before being reduced to a barracks ship in May 1890. In 1907, she was sold for scrap; by that time, Leipzig too had been reduced to a barracks ship and stationary training hulk in 1895, though she survived until 1919, when she sank accidentally. Raised in 1921, she too was broken up for scrap.

== Background ==
The development of the Leipzig class traces as far back as the fleet plan of 1867, which was initially created by Eduard von Jachmann in 1865. The plan was an expansion program aimed at strengthening the Prussian Navy in the wake of the Austro-Prussian War, and it called for a total of twenty screw corvettes, along with a host of other vessel types. By the time the Prussian Landtag (State Diet) approved the plan on 15 October 1867, the country had created the North German Confederation with it at its head, and thus the Prussian Navy briefly passed into existence as the North German Federal Navy, though it remained an entirely Prussian organization. The navy was at that time under the direction of Albrecht von Roon, the Minister of War.

Following the German victory in the Franco-Prussian War of 1870–1871, the northern and southern German states unified into the German Empire in January 1871; at the same time, the Federal Navy was again renamed, now as the Kaiserliche Marine (Imperial Navy). Kaiser Wilhelm I created the Kaiserliche Admiralität (Imperial Admiralty) to govern the navy on 30 November 1871, and placed General Albrecht von Stosch as its head as the admiralty chief. At the same time, the Reichstag (Imperial Diet) requested an update on the progress of the fleet plan thus far. By then, the navy had completed nine of the corvettes and another four were under construction, leaving another seven due to be built by 1877.

The Reichstag was displeased with the state of the fleet, and on 28 May 1872, ordered a revision of the plan. One of the chief issues that confronted Stosch as the new head of the navy was the strategic purpose of his fleet. He believed the primary purposes of the fleet were to defend the German coast and to protect German merchant shipping abroad. The large and expensive capital ships that had already been acquired in the late 1860s were sufficient to accomplish the former task, and so Stosch preferred focusing on a fleet of cruising vessels for the commerce protection mission. Accordingly, he retained the number of corvettes as originally prescribed in the fleet plan that was ultimately approved in April 1873.

== Design ==
The Admiralty initially planned the next corvette to be a repeat of Freya, which was a variant of the Ariadne class, being half a knot faster and about 300 metric tons (300 long tons; 330 short tons) heavier than her half-sister ships. The new ship, to have been named Thusnelda, would be built at the Kaiserliche Werft (Imperial Shipyard) in Danzig, and it was intended that her top speed be increased by another half-knot, to 15 knots (28 km/h; 17 mph). The design study soon demonstrated that the required propulsion system was too heavy for the existing, wooden hull, so it would be necessary to substitute iron as the chief construction material. At the time, there was significant debate over the use of iron to construct the hull of large warships, rather than traditional wood planking. The iron-hulled Preussen class of ironclad warships that had been begun in 1868 proved to be a success, as had the British screw frigate HMS Inconstant, the first iron-hulled cruising warship in the world. As a result, the Construction Department decided to adopt an iron hull for the new corvette design.

The new design was prepared in 1871–1872, using the British Inconstant as a model, though scaled down in size, as the British vessel was far too large (and expensive) for German needs. Work began two years later. The designers had intended that the ships would be used as reconnaissance vessels for the main fleet in addition to normal cruiser duties like showing the flag, protecting German merchant shipping, and securing German economic interests abroad. But shortly before work on the two corvettes was completed, the British frigate HMS Shah and the corvette HMS Amethyst fought the Peruvian ironclad Huáscar in the Battle of Pacocha, which demonstrated that unarmored warships were effectively useless against modern armored warships. So Leipzig and Prinz Adalbert would be used only on foreign deployments where they would be unlikely to encounter such vessels. Carl Paschen, who later commanded both ships during his career, described them as "livable ships", praising their spacious hulls that proved to be well-suited to the ships' long deployments abroad.

=== Characteristics ===
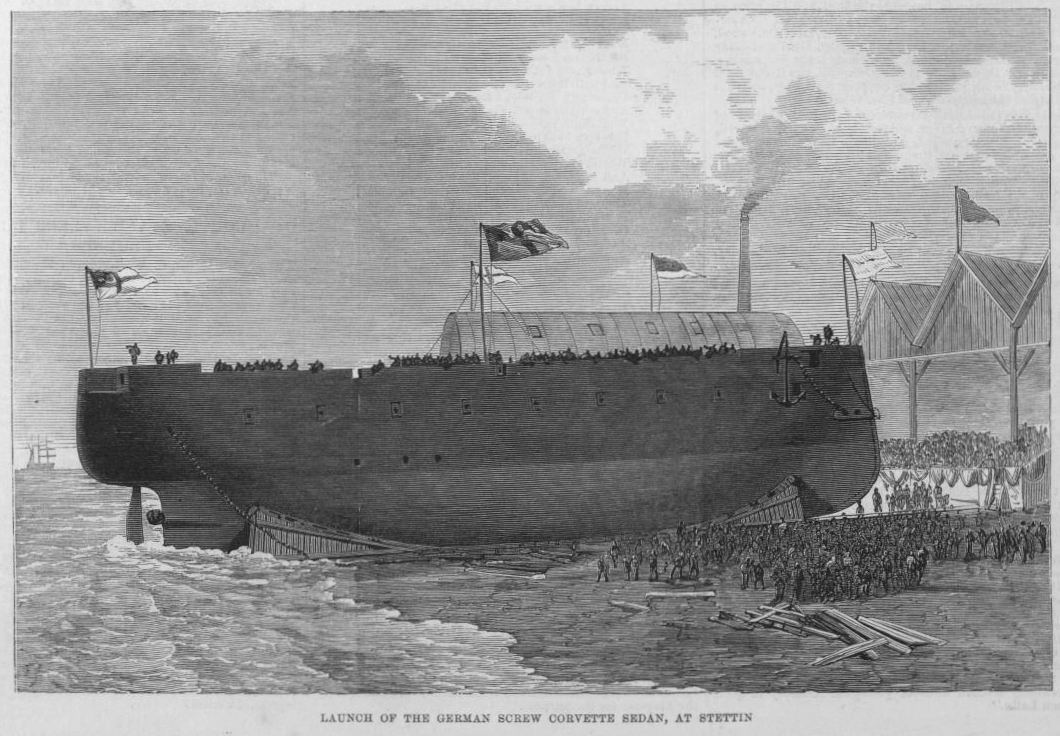
Launch of Prinz Adalbert, showing the shape of the ship's hull

The ships of the Leipzig class were 87 meters (285 ft 5 in) long at the waterline and 87.5 m (287 ft 1 in) long overall. They had a beam of 14 m (45 ft 11 in) and a draft of 6.2 m (20 ft 4 in) forward and 6.9 m (22 ft 8 in) aft. They displaced 3,980 metric tons (3,920 long tons) as designed and up to 4,626 t (4,553 long tons) at full load.

The ships' hulls were constructed with transverse and longitudinal iron frames, to which the iron hull plating was fixed. Because iron was much more susceptible to biofouling, it was necessary to protect the hull with two layers of wood planking—the first teak and the second oak—and a layer of copper sheathing. (Note: The wood layers were needed to prevent electrolytic reaction between differing metal types, which was already a well-known phenomenon at the time.) This was particularly necessary, since the ships were intended to be deployed on long-distance cruises where periodic maintenance would not be possible. The hulls were divided into seven watertight compartments. Both ships had a double bottom under the engine room. The ships were designed with a forecastle, but were completed with a flush deck instead. They had a straight stem and, unlike most larger vessels of the era, did not have a ram bow.

Leipzig and Prinz Adalbert were stiff vessels, rolling and pitching badly, particularly when their fuel bunkers were full. They performed moderately under sail. The ship's crew consisted of 39 officers and 386 enlisted men. Each ship carried a number of smaller boats, including one picket boat, two launches, one pinnace, one cutter, two yawls, and one dinghy.

=== Machinery ===
The ships were powered by a single horizontal, 3-cylinder marine steam engine that drove one 2-bladed screw propeller that was 6 m (20 ft) in diameter. Steam was provided by six coal-fired fire-tube boilers. These were placed in a single boiler room and were ducted into a single, retractable funnel. Leipzig had a designed speed of 14 knots (26 km/h; 16 mph) from 1200 nominal horsepower, but on speed trials, she reached 15.8 knots (29.3 km/h; 18.2 mph) at 6,050 metric horsepower (5,970 ihp). Prinz Adalbert had similar performance. The ships had a cruising radius of 2,330 nautical miles (4,320 km; 2,680 mi) at a speed of 10 knots (19 km/h; 12 mph), and at a speed of 14 knots, their range fell to 1,580 nmi (2,930 km; 1,820 mi).

Leipzig and Prinz Adalbert were equipped with a full ship rig to supplement their steam engines on long-distance cruises. The total sail area amounted to 2,600 m^{2} (28,000 sq ft), which was found to be insufficient once the ships entered service; this was the same sail area as the Arcona-class frigates, which were half the size of the Leipzigs. As a result, the corvettes were not particularly effective under sail.

=== Armament ===
Leipzig in dry dock in 1885 during an extensive refit; the forward gun port for one of the 17 cm guns is clearly visible

The ships of the Leipzig class were armed with a battery of twelve 17 cm (6.7 in) breech-loading guns, two of which were 25-caliber (cal.); the other ten were shorter 20-cal. weapons. The two longer guns were mounted on the upper deck, one forward and the other aft, for use as chase guns, while the rest were located on the broadside. The forward-most pair of broadside guns could also be directed through gun ports firing on limited arcs directly ahead. The guns had a range of 5,000 m (16,000 ft) and were supplied with a total of 1,226 shells. The ships each carried a pair of 8.8 cm (3.5 in) landing guns that could be taken ashore with a landing party.

=== Modifications ===
Between 1881 and 1882, both ships had four 37 mm (1.5 in) Hotchkiss revolver cannon installed, along with four 35 cm (13.8 in) torpedo tubes. These were all above-water launchers, with two in the bow and one on each side. The ships carried a total of ten torpedoes. By that time, the number of landing guns was increased to four. Leipzig later had her light gun battery augmented with another pair of 3.7 cm cannon.

When she was modernized again in the mid-1880s, Leipzig received ten Scotch marine boilers, which were divided into two boiler rooms. The additional boilers necessitated the installation of a second funnel, which unlike her original funnel, was fixed in place. Her original screw was replaced with a four-bladed propeller that was 5.8 m (19 ft) in diameter. She also had an electrical generator installed, which produced 9.1 kilowatts (12.2 hp) at 55 Volts. In addition, Leipzig had her copper sheathing replaced, and her hull was divided into ten watertight compartments.

After having been taken out of service in 1894, Leipzig was reduced to training duties; this included the installation of the first wireless telegraphy school in the German fleet. Her conversion into a training ship also included removal of her masts and the construction of a large deck house.

== Ships ==
Construction data
| Ship | Builder | Laid down | Launched | Completed |
|---|---|---|---|---|
| Leipzig | AG Vulcan, Stettin | 1 April 1874 | 13 September 1875 | 1 June 1877 |
| Prinz Adalbert | AG Vulcan, Stettin | 1875 | 17 June 1876 | 28 August 1877 |

== Service history ==
=== Leipzig ===
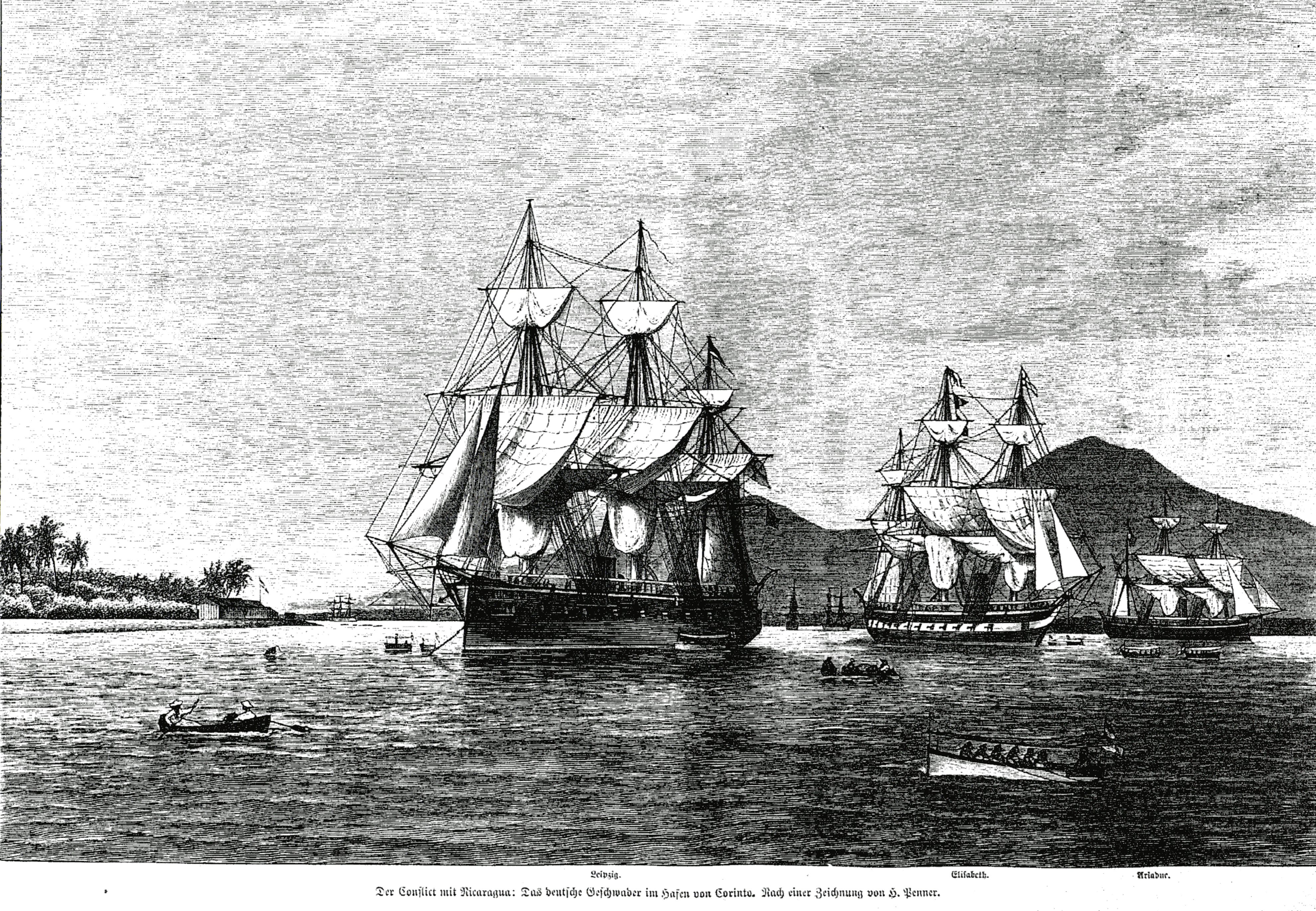
Illustration of the Central America Squadron, with Leipzig, Elisabeth, and Ariadne from left to right

Leipzig went on two overseas cruises as a training ship for naval cadets early in her career. The first, in 1877–1878, went to Central America and East Asia; while in Central American waters, she was involved in an international dispute between Germany and Nicaragua. The bulk of her time in Asia was spent in Japan and passed uneventfully. The second cruise, which took place from 1882 to 1884, also went to East Asia. During this deployment, she carried the German Consul General from China to Korea to negotiate a trade deal. While on the way back to Germany, she stopped in the newly proclaimed colony of German Southwest Africa, where she participated in the flag-raising ceremony. From 1885 to 1888, Leipzig was extensively modernized and reconstructed for use as a squadron flagship overseas. Repeated problems with the modernization, particularly over the ship's speed, delayed completion of the work by a year and a half.

In 1888, Leipzig embarked on a major overseas deployment, first to German East Africa, which was in the midst of the Abushiri revolt. Leipzig and several other warships formed a cruiser squadron under the command of Konteradmiral (Rear Admiral) Karl August Deinhard. The ships assisted in the defense of Dar es Salaam and Bagamoyo, bombarded rebel troops along the coast, and sent landing parties ashore to help retake towns that had been captured by the rebels. The revolt was defeated by 1890, allowing Leipzig and the other corvettes of the squadron to sail to East Asia. But after the outbreak of the Chilean Civil War of 1891, the ships were sent to protect German nationals in the country and they sent a landing party to Valparaíso to safeguard Germans in the city. After the war ended, Leipzig sailed to East Africa, where her presence proved to be unnecessary. She continued on to East Asia before being recalled to East Africa owing to fears of renewed conflict resulting from the succession of Sultan Ali bin Said of Zanzibar. This was an unfounded concern, and after an inspection in Cape Town revealed a significant deterioration in her condition, she was recalled to Germany. Found to be not worth repairing, she was converted into a barracks ship and training hulk in 1895, a role she filled until 1919, when she sank unexpectedly. She was raised in 1921 and subsequently broken up that year.

=== Prinz Adalbert ===
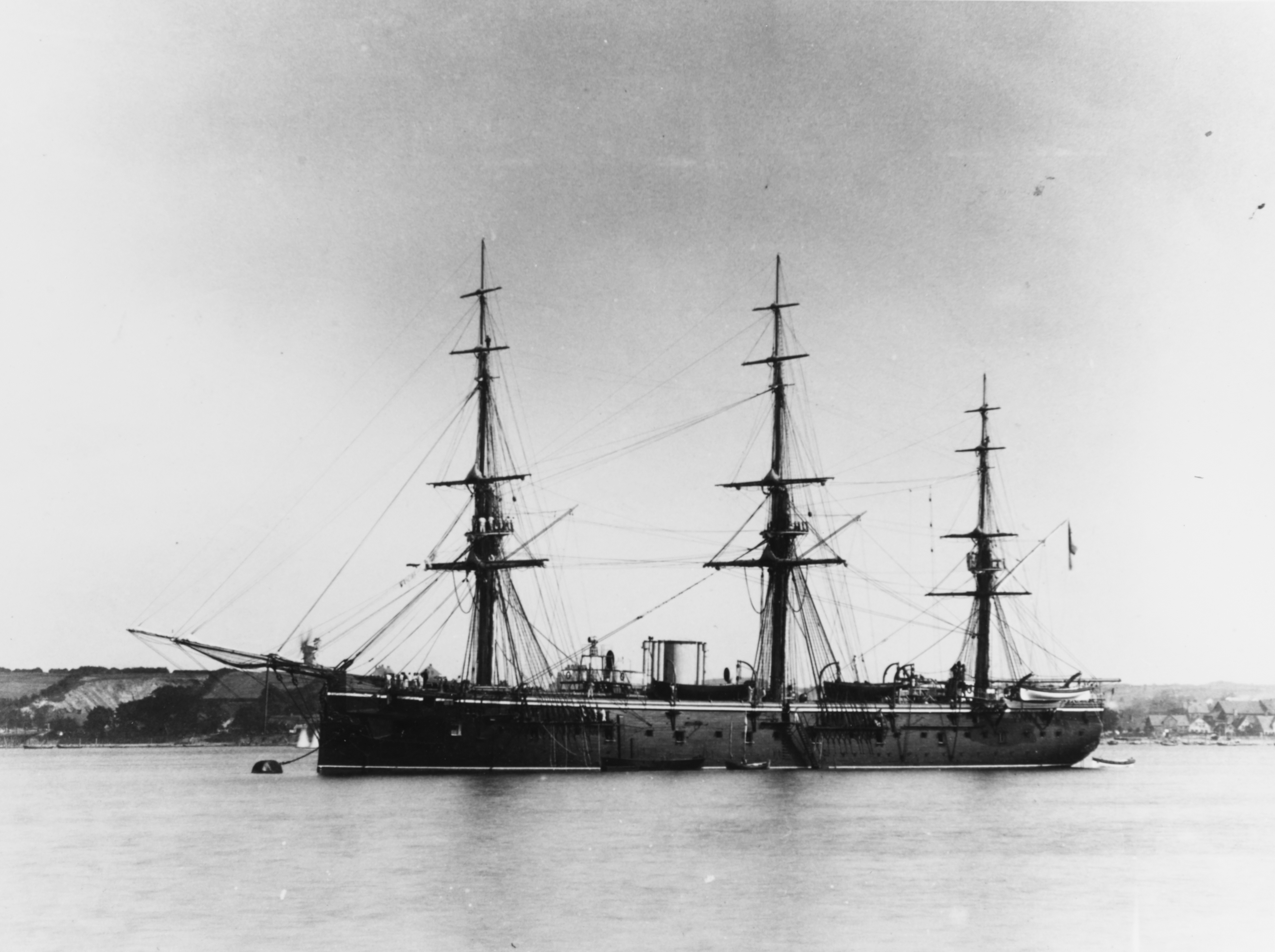
Prinz Adalbert in Wilhelmshaven in the 1880s

The second Leipzig-class corvette was originally named Sedan after the 1870 Battle of Sedan of the Franco-Prussian War, but she was renamed Prinz Adalbert in 1878 to avoid antagonizing France. Prinz Adalbert went on two overseas cruises during her career, both to East Asia. The first voyage, which lasted from late 1878 to late 1880, saw the ship pass through the Atlantic, around South America, and across the Pacific to China. Her time there was uneventful, though Prince Heinrich, Kaiser Wilhelm I's grandson, was aboard the ship as part of his naval training. The second cruise, from late 1883 to late 1885, was repeatedly altered; her voyage to East Asia was delayed by an order to carry Crown Prince Friedrich to Spain. From there, she passed through the Suez Canal, transited the Indian Ocean, and then sailed north to China. While she was in Asian waters, she observed the Sino-French War of 1884, during which she helped protect Europeans in China. Prinz Adalbert remained in Asia for less than six months before being ordered home. The return voyage was delayed several times, first with orders to protect German interests in western South America, then to join a new cruiser squadron to settle a dispute with Zanzibar, once again to serve as the flagship of that squadron while the other vessel was being repaired, and again during a colonial dispute with Spain.

After Prinz Adalbert returned to Germany in late 1885, she was converted into a training ship for naval cadets the following year, a role she filled for less than three years. During this period, she conducted training cruises in the Baltic Sea, participated in fleet exercises, and joined the other training ships on long-distance cruises to the West Indies and Cape Verde. Worn out by 1888, she was decommissioned and reduced to a barracks ship, a role she filled until 1907, when she was stricken from the naval register and broken up in Rotterdam.
