= Ariadne-class corvette =

Screw corvette class of the Prussian and German Imperial Navy

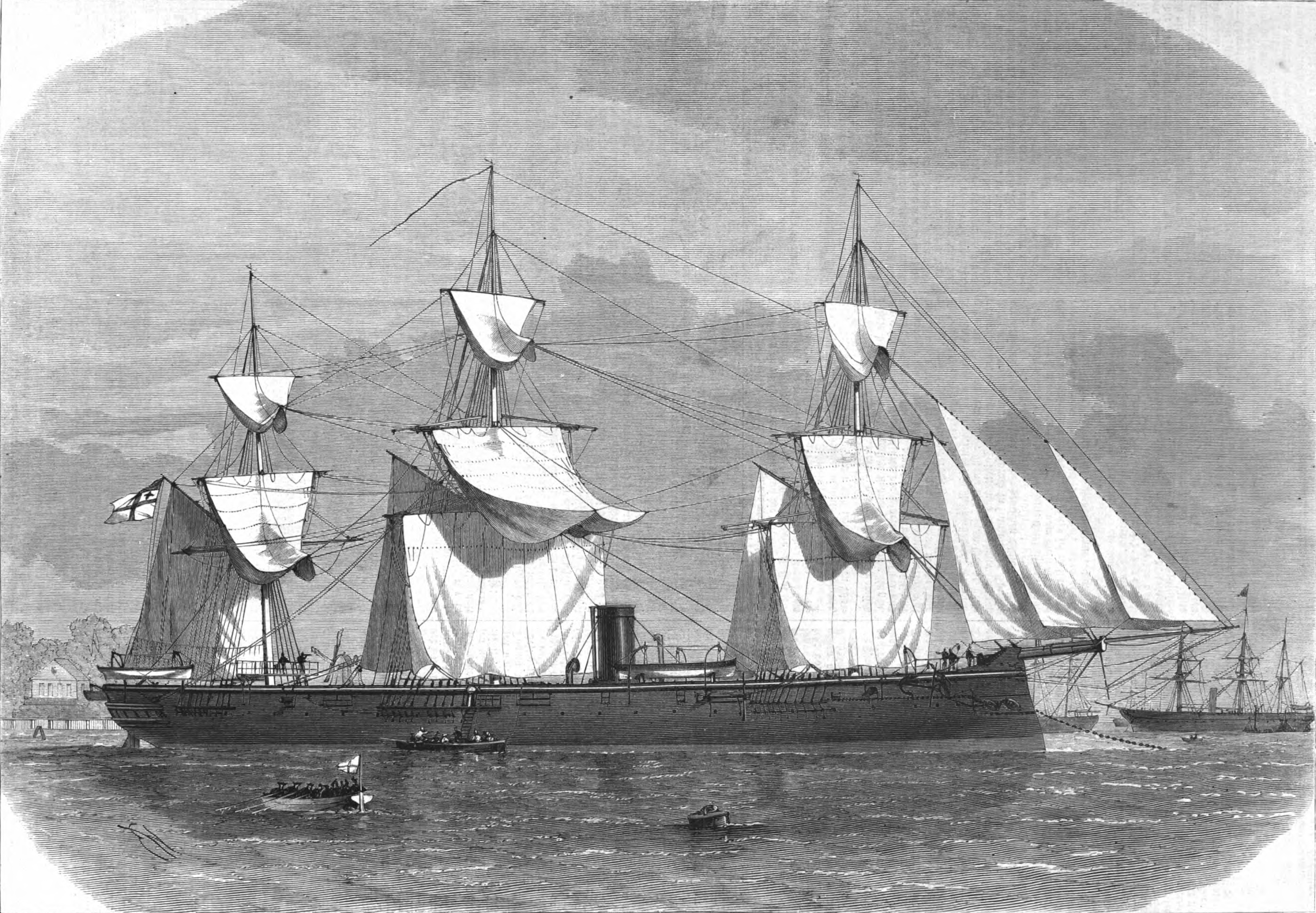
- Illustration of Ariadne, c. 1871

Class overview
- Name: Ariadne class
- Builders: Kaiserliche Werft, Danzig
- Preceded by: Augusta-class corvette
- Succeeded by: Leipzig-class corvette
- Built: 1868–1876
- In service: 1872–1896
- Completed: 3
- Scrapped: 3

General characteristics
- Type: Screw corvette
- Displacement: Full load: 2,072 metric tons (2,039 long tons)
- Length: 68.16 meters (223 ft 7 in) (loa)
- Beam: 10.8 m (35 ft 5 in)
- Draft: 4.8 m (15 ft 9 in)
- Installed power: 4 × fire-tube boilers; 2,100 metric horsepower (2,100 ihp)
- Propulsion: 1 × marine steam engine; 1 × screw propeller
- Sail plan: Full-rigged ship
- Speed: 14 knots (26 km/h; 16 mph)
- Range: 1,340 nautical miles (2,480 km; 1,540 mi) at 10 kn (19 km/h; 12 mph)
- Crew: 13 officers; 220 sailors
- Armament: 6 × 15 cm RK L/22 (5.9 in) guns; 2 × 12 cm (4.7 in) guns

The Ariadne class was a group of three screw corvettes of the North German Federal Navy and Imperial Navy, built in the 1860s and 1870s. The class comprised three ships: Ariadne, Luise, and Freya. The first two vessels were identical, but Freya was built to a modified design with a longer hull, which allowed her to carry more powerful engines and additional coal for the boilers. The ships were ordered as part of a naval construction program directed at strengthening the North German Federal Navy, though by the time they entered service, all of the German states had united into the German Empire. They were intended to serve on extended cruises abroad, protecting German interests overseas. Their primary armament consisted of six or eight 15 cm (5.9 in) guns, and they were fitted with full ship rigs to supplement their steam engines on long voyages abroad.

All three of the ships served extensively on overseas deployments throughout the 1870s and early 1880s, primarily in South America, the Mediterranean Sea, and East Asia. On these voyages, the ships and their captains performed a number of duties, including protecting German nationals during periods of unrest or open warfare in various countries, negotiating trade agreements with numerous governments, and combating piracy. They were also tasked with conducting surveys to improve navigational charts and scientific experiments.

In the early to mid-1880s, all three of the ships were converted into training ships for apprentice seamen, and they went on training cruises over the course of the rest of the decade. These frequently went to the West Indies, where they were used to show the flag. While on one such training cruise in 1883, Freya helped to protect civilians in Haiti during a period of unrest on the island. All three ships were decommissioned by 1892, with Ariadne being immediately scrapped. Luise survived as a hulk and torpedo test ship until 1896 when she too was sold for scrap, and Freya simply saw no further use between her decommissioning in 1884 and her disposal in 1896.

== Design ==
In 1867, the North German Admiralty under the direction of Konteradmiral (Rear Admiral) Eduard von Jachmann formulated a new fleet plan, an expansion program aimed at strengthening the North German Federal Navy in the wake of the Austro-Prussian War. The plan called for a total of twenty screw corvettes, which were intended to be used to protect German economic interests abroad. At the time, German commercial interests began to expand to overseas markets in Asia and the Pacific, which required long-range cruising warships, particularly as other European powers started to exclude German businesses from activity abroad. The Admiralty issued an order on 15 February 1868 to begin construction of a new class of corvettes; at the same time, the contract for the first ship, to be named Ariadne, was awarded to the Königliche Werft (Royal Shipyard) in Danzig. Design work on the class was completed in 1869, the same year construction began on the first vessel. Freya was the last wooden-hulled vessel of the German fleet. She was built to a slightly different design, essentially having a lengthened hull, with the increased space being used to house more powerful machinery and additional coal storage for an extended cruising radius. The three vessels were the first cruising ships of the German fleet to carry breech-loading guns.

=== General characteristics ===
The Ariadne-class ships were 65.8 meters (215 ft 11 in) long at the waterline and 68.16 m (223 ft 7 in) long overall. They had a beam of 10.8 m (35 ft 5 in) and a draft of 4.8 m (15 ft 9 in) forward and 5.7 m (18 ft 8 in) aft. They displaced 1,692 metric tons (1,665 long tons) as designed and up to 2,072 t (2,039 long tons) at full load. The ships' hulls were constructed with transverse timber frames, with the outer hull being carvel built. They were sheathed with copper to protect the wood from biofouling on long-distance cruises, where regular maintenance could not be performed. Freya had four watertight compartments, while the earlier two ships had none.

Over the course of their careers, the ships' crews varied between 13 and 14 officers and 220 to 234 enlisted men. Each ship carried a number of small boats, including two pinnaces, two yawls, and three dinghies. The ships were excellent sea boats, but they suffered from severe weather helm, they sailed badly, and they were not maneuverable vessels under sail. Freya was particularly difficult to steer. The ships' propeller did not rotate freely from the shaft at low speed, and so it had a significant braking effect under sail. Despite their characteristics under sail, they maneuvered quite well under steam.

=== Machinery ===
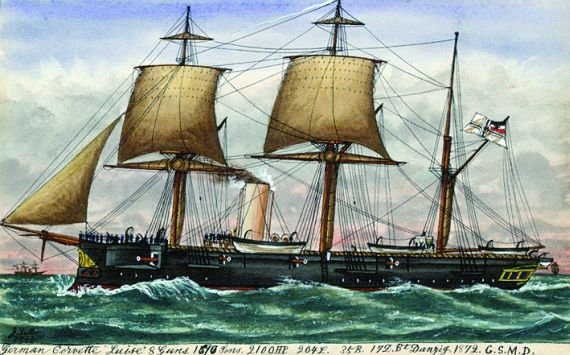
Watercolor of Luise

The ships were powered by a single 3-cylinder marine steam engine that drove one 4-bladed screw propeller. The first two ships' screws were 4.56 m (15 ft) in diameter, and Freya's was 5.34 m (17 ft 6 in) wide. Steam was provided by four coal-fired fire-tube boilers, which were ducted into a single, retractable funnel. As built, the Ariadne-class ships were equipped with a full ship rig, but this was later reduced to a barque rig in all three vessels. Steering was controlled with a single rudder.

The first two ships were rated at a top speed of 14 knots (26 km/h; 16 mph) from 2,100 metric horsepower (2,100 ihp), but they both slightly exceeded those figures on speed trials, both making 14.1 knots (26.1 km/h; 16.2 mph) at 2,260 to 2,392 PS (2,229 to 2,359 ihp). Freya was designed to have a speed of 14.5 knots (26.9 km/h; 16.7 mph) from 2,400 PS (2,400 ihp), but she reached a speed of 15.2 knots (28.2 km/h; 17.5 mph) from 2,801 PS (2,763 ihp) on trials. Ariadne and Luise could carry 168 t (165 long tons) of coal, while Freya could carry 264 t (260 long tons). The first two ships had a cruising radius of 1,340 nautical miles (2,480 km; 1,540 mi) at a speed of 10 knots (19 km/h; 12 mph), which reduced to 630 nmi (1,170 km; 720 mi) at a speed of 13 knots (24 km/h; 15 mph). Freya had significantly more endurance, owing to her increased coal supply, being capable of steaming for 2,500 nmi (4,600 km; 2,900 mi) at 10 knots and 1,060 nmi (1,960 km; 1,220 mi) at 15 knots (28 km/h; 17 mph).

=== Armament ===
Ariadne and Luise were armed with a battery of six 15 cm RK L/22 breech-loading guns, which had a length of 22-calibers. There were also two 12 cm (4.7 in) L/23 guns, all on the broadside. Of the 15 cm guns four were on sliding carriages for changing gunport. The guns were supplied with 400 rounds and 200 rounds, respectively. In 1882, they had four 37 mm (1.5 in) Hotchkiss revolver cannon installed. Freya, instead, had eight and later seven 15 cm 22-cal. guns with 760 shells and four 17 cm (6.7 in) 25-cal. guns, though the latter were removed early in her career; these were also broadside guns. In 1881, she also received six 37 mm Hotchkiss revolver cannon.

== Ships ==
Construction data
Ship	Builder	Laid down	Launched	Completed
Ariadne	Königliche Werft, Danzig	1868	21 July 1871	23 November 1872
Luise	Kaiserliche Werft, Danzig	1871	16 December 1872	4 June 1874
Freya	Kaiserliche Werft, Danzig	1874	29 December 1874	1 October 1876
Thusnelda	Contract reordered as Leipzig	—	—	—

== Service history ==
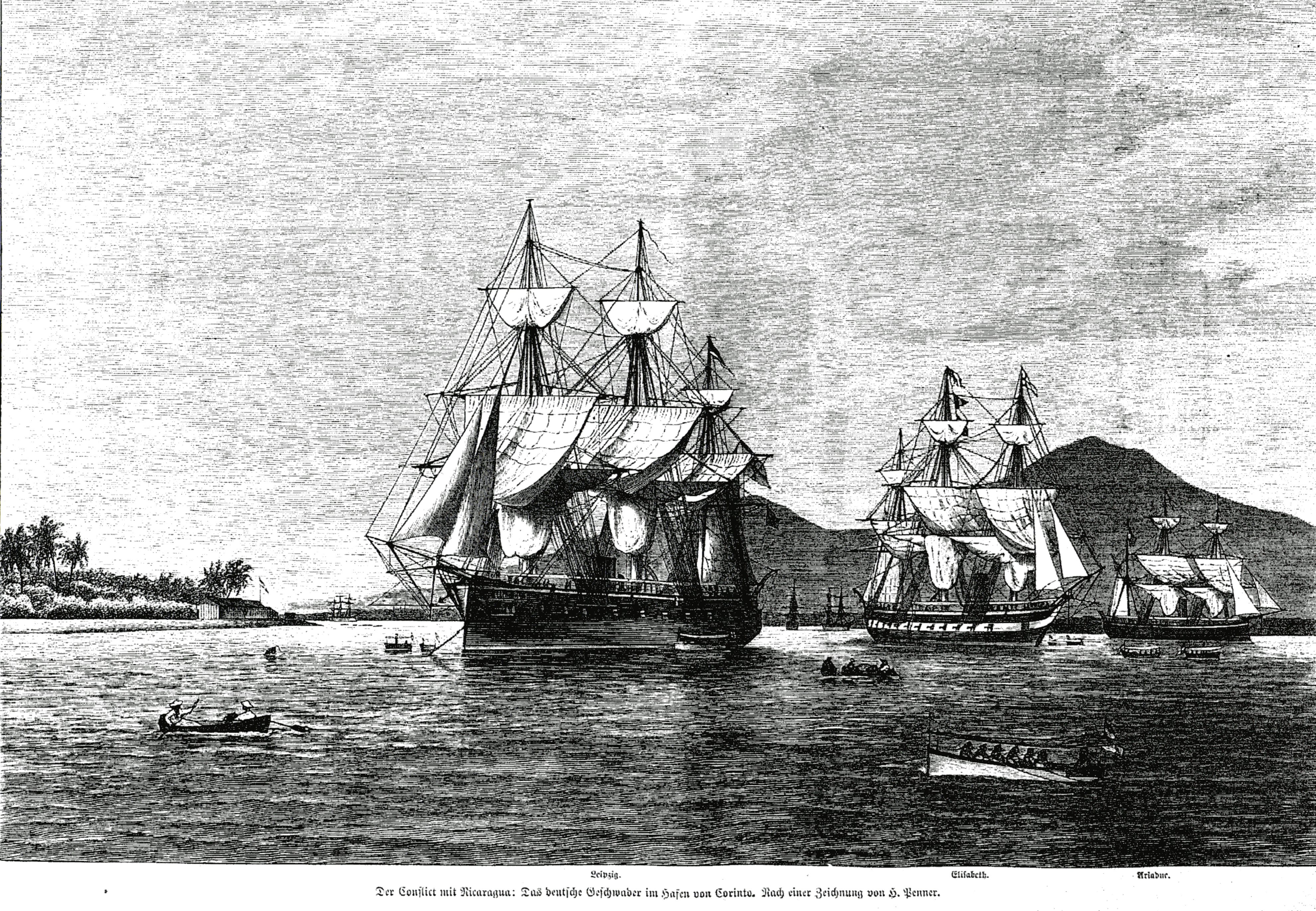
Illustration of the Central America Squadron, with Leipzig, Elisabeth, and Ariadne from left to right

=== Ariadne ===
Ariadne went on four major overseas cruises during her career. The first, from late 1874 to late 1876, saw the ship visit Chinese waters where she protected German shipping from pirate attacks, which were a common problem in the region in the 1870s. During the second, which lasted from late 1877 to late 1879, Ariadne operated off South America and the central Pacific Ocean. While in South American waters, she visited several countries in the area to show the flag. In the central Pacific, her captain negotiated a series of trade agreements with local chiefs on various islands in Melanesia, Micronesia, and Polynesia. In 1880–1881, the ship went to South American waters to protect German interests during the War of the Pacific between Peru, Chile, and Bolivia; her operations during this period were largely confined to the cities of Ancón and Lima, Peru. In 1884–1885, she operated off West Africa, where she negotiated the acquisition of a protectorate in what is now Guinea.

The rest of Ariadne's career was uneventful. After returning to Germany in 1885, Ariadne was reassigned as a training ship for apprentice seamen, a role she performed for the next five years. During this period, she went on training cruises to the Caribbean Sea and visited numerous foreign ports, conducted training in the Baltic Sea, and participated in fleet exercises in German waters. Ariadne also participated in ceremonial activities, including the beginning of construction of the Kaiser Wilhelm Canal in 1887 and a naval review held during a visit from an Austro-Hungarian squadron in 1890. She was decommissioned in September 1890, stricken from the naval register in April 1891, and sold to ship breakers in October.

=== Luise ===
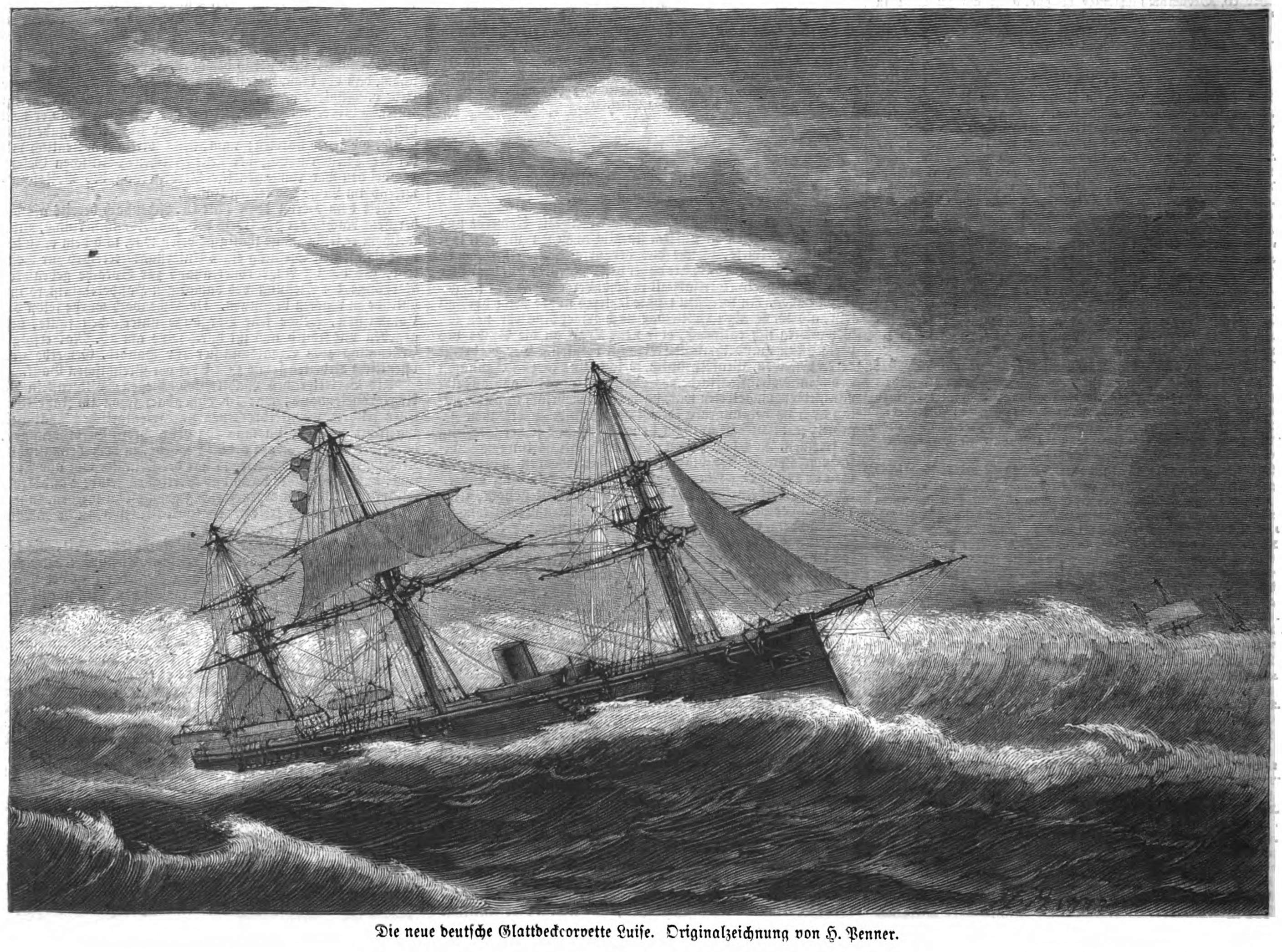
Illustration of Luise in heavy seas

Luise went on two major overseas cruises early in her career, both to East Asian waters. The first lasted from 1875 and 1877; during the cruise, she visited Chinese ports to protect German interests and show the flag. She also conducted a hydrographic survey of the Yangtze river, and was damaged in an accidental collision with a British ironclad warship in Japan. The second lasted from 1878 to 1880 and saw similar activities, though during her time in the East Asia Squadron, she served as its flagship. During this deployment, she conducted deep-ocean temperature and salinity experiments and protected German nationals in Shanghai during unrest in the area. While on the way home, she attempted to negotiate a dispute between Germany and Madagascar, but a severe storm forced her to leave before a settlement could be reached in order to avoid being damaged.

In 1881, after returning to Germany, Luise was converted into a training ship, and she served in this capacity for most of the rest of her career. She made several overseas cruises, visiting the Americas twice in 1881–1882 and 1885; during these cruises, she visited numerous ports in North, Central, and South America. In 1886, she participated in the British fleet review, where she represented Germany. The ship carried replacement crews to the gunboats stationed in German West Africa in 1886 and 1887. Luise was hulked in 1892 and used as a torpedo test ship in 1894–1896, before being stricken from the naval register in December 1896. She was sold for scrap the following year and broken up in Hamburg.

=== Freya ===
Freya went on two major overseas cruises in the course of her fairly uneventful career. The first was from 1877 to 1879, and the second followed immediately thereafter from 1879 to 1881. On the first cruise, she went to the eastern Mediterranean Sea and toured various ports in Greece and the Ottoman Empire, and then proceeded to China as part of the East Asia Squadron. On the way back to Germany, she had a boiler explosion that killed four crewmen and badly burned several more. The second voyage began with a deployment to Chilean waters to protect German interests during the War of the Pacific, after which she returned to Chinese waters. There, she conducted hydrographic surveys and attempted to suppress piracy; on the return to Germany her captain died from typhoid fever.

After returning to Germany in 1881, she was converted into a training ship and returned to service in that capacity in 1883. She went on only one major training cruise, which lasted from mid-1883 to late 1884. During the voyage she toured ports in the Americas and helped to protect civilians during a period of civil unrest in Haiti in late 1883. She was thereafter decommissioned and remained out of service for the rest of her existence, seeing no further use. She was stricken from the naval register in 1896 and sold to ship breakers the following year.
