= Frøydis =

Frøydis or Freydis is a Norwegian female first name. It is from the Norse god Frøya's name and dís (goddess).

== People with the given name ==
Frøydis

- Frøydis Armand
- Frøydis Ree Wekre

Freydis

- Freydís Eiríksdóttir

== See also ==
- Freyja
- Freya (given name)
- Dís
