= SMS Luise =

Screw corvette of the Prussian and German Imperial Navy

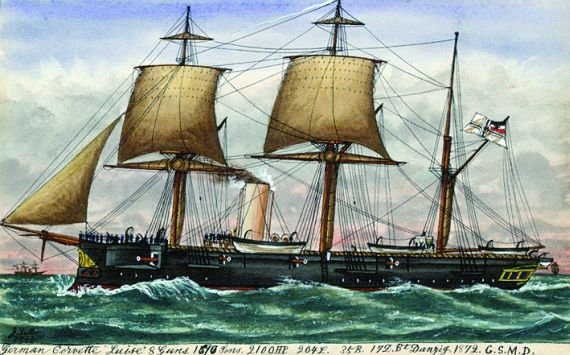
- Luise, by James Scott Maxwell

History

German Empire
- Name: Luise
- Namesake: Princess Louise of Prussia
- Builder: Kaiserliche Werft, Danzig
- Laid down: 1871
- Launched: 16 December 1872
- Commissioned: 4 June 1874
- Decommissioned: 16 April 1896
- Stricken: 19 December 1896
- Fate: Broken up, 1897

General characteristics
- Class & type: Ariadne-class corvette
- Displacement: Full load: 2,072 metric tons (2,039 long tons)
- Length: 68.16 meters (223 ft 7 in) (loa)
- Beam: 10.8 m (35 ft 5 in)
- Draft: 4.8 m (15 ft 9 in)
- Installed power: 4 × fire-tube boilers; 2,100 metric horsepower (2,100 ihp)
- Propulsion: 1 × marine steam engine; 1 × screw propeller
- Sail plan: Full-rigged ship
- Speed: 14 knots (26 km/h; 16 mph)
- Range: 1,340 nautical miles (2,480 km; 1,540 mi) at 10 kn (19 km/h; 12 mph)
- Crew: 13 officers; 220 sailors
- Armament: 6 × 15 cm RK L/22 (5.9 in) guns; 2 × 12 cm (4.7 in) guns

SMS Luise was a steam corvette of the German Kaiserliche Marine (Imperial Navy). She was the second member of the Ariadne class, which included two other ships, Ariadne and Freya. Ordered as part of a large naval expansion program after the Austro-Prussian War, she was laid down in 1871 during the Franco-Prussian War. She was launched in December 1872 and completed in June 1874. Luise was a small vessel, armed with a battery of just eight guns.

Luise went on two major overseas cruises early in her career, both to East Asian waters. The first lasted from 1875 and 1877; during the cruise, she visited Chinese ports to protect German interests and show the flag. The second lasted from 1878 to 1880 and saw similar activities, though during her time in the East Asia Squadron, she served as its flagship. While on the way home, she attempted to negotiate a dispute between Germany and Madagascar, but a severe storm forced her to leave before a settlement could be reached.

In 1881, Luise was converted into a training ship, and she served in this capacity for most of the rest of her career. She made several overseas cruises, visiting the Americas twice in 1881–1882 and 1885. The ship carried replacement crews to the gunboats stationed in German West Africa in 1886 and 1887. Luise was hulked in 1892 and used as a torpedo test ship in 1894–1896, before being stricken from the naval register in December 1896. She was sold for scrap the following year and broken up in Hamburg.

== Design ==
The three Ariadne-class corvettes were ordered as part of the fleet plan of 1867, an expansion program aimed at strengthening the Prussian Navy in the wake of the Austro-Prussian War. The plan called for a total of twenty screw corvettes. The design for Luise was prepared in 1869, but work on the ship was delayed until 1871 by the outbreak of the Franco-Prussian War.

Luise was 68.16 meters (223 ft 7 in) long overall, with a beam of 10.8 m (35 ft 5 in) and a draft of 4.8 m (15 ft 9 in) forward. She displaced 2,072 metric tons (2,039 long tons) at full load. The ship's crew consisted of 12 officers and 220 enlisted men. She was powered by a single marine steam engine that drove one 4-bladed screw propeller, with steam provided by four coal-fired fire-tube boilers, which gave her a top speed of 14.1 knots (26.1 km/h; 16.2 mph) at 2,392 metric horsepower (2,359 ihp). She had a cruising radius of 1,340 nautical miles (2,480 km; 1,540 mi) at a speed of 10 knots (19 km/h; 12 mph). As built, Luise was equipped with a full ship rig, but this was later reduced to a barque rig.

Luise was armed with a battery of six 15 cm (5.9 in) 22-caliber (cal.) breech-loading guns and two 12 cm (4.7 in) 23-cal. guns. In 1882, she had four 37 mm (1.5 in) Hotchkiss revolver cannon installed.

== Service history ==
The keel for Luise, named for Princess Louise of Prussia, was laid down in 1871 at the Kaiserliche Werft (Imperial Shipyard) in Danzig. She was launched on 16 December 1872 without any celebration and she was commissioned into the fleet on 4 June 1874. She then began sea trials, which ended in mid-July, after which she was moved to Wilhelmshaven and decommissioned in late August.

=== First deployment abroad ===
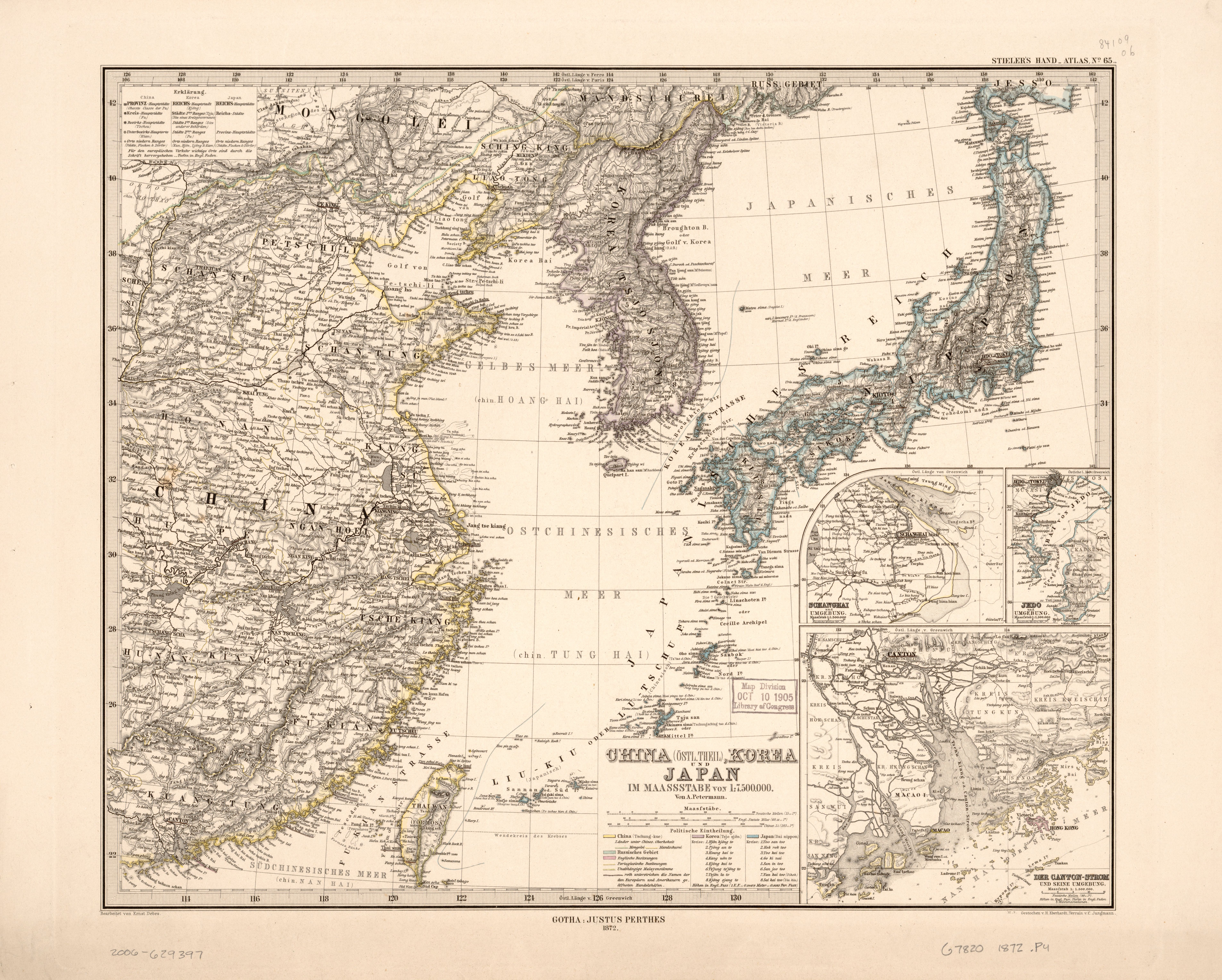
German 1872 map of China, Japan, and Korea

Luise was reactivated in early 1875 for training operations with the main fleet in German waters. She was ordered on a deployment abroad late in the year, which she began on 11 October. She left Wilhelmshaven on 26 October and sailed through the Atlantic Ocean to Rio de Janeiro, Brazil before rounding the Cape of Good Hope into the Indian Ocean. She arrived in Melbourne, Australia on 1 April 1876, where she was compelled to stay for two weeks, since a fever had broken out among the crew. From there, Luise sailed to Jolo, the main island of the Sulu Archipelago of the Philippines. In the capital of Jolo, she attempted to secure payment of a debt owed to a German merchant, but she was unable to do so, as the residents of the town had burned it to the ground and fled to the interior of the island during a revolt against the colonial Spanish government.

Luise met with the East Asia Squadron in Hong Kong on 1 July and she relieved her sister ship Ariadne, which then began the voyage back to Germany. On 13 July, Luise sailed to Chefoo in company with the squadron flagship, the screw frigate Vineta, since the German ambassador feared there would be Chinese riots as a result of British activities in the area. By the end of September, the threat of unrest had passed, and so on 1 October, Luise was able to begin a tour of several Chinese ports. At the end of January 1877, Luise went to Shanghai to ensure that the Chinese authorities had dropped the tax on German imports in the port. She then steamed up the Yangtze to Wuhu to show the flag and conduct hydrographic surveys. Luise sailed to Nagasaki, Japan, after her work around Wuhu was completed. There, she underwent an overhaul; during this work, the British ironclad warship HMS Audacious accidentally collided with her, crushing three of her boats and wrecking one of the boat cranes. After repairs were completed, Luise received the order to return to Germany; she left Nagasaki on 7 May and arrived back in Wilhelmshaven on 1 September. At the beginning of 1878, she went into the shipyard to be modernized, which included a reduction of her sailing rig.

=== Second deployment abroad ===
Luise was reactivated in late 1878 for another foreign cruise, and Otto von Diederichs, the executive officer, arrived in late August to prepare the ship to go to sea. The crew was assembled by 20 November, and over the next ten days, they made preparations for the voyage. These included repairs to the ship, remounting of her guns, and the installation of a pair of torpedo tubes for Whitehead torpedoes, which were to be tested during the cruise. On 30 November, Konteradmiral (Rear Admiral) Carl Ferdinand Batsch came aboard to preside over her recommissioning. Luise left Germany on 3 December under the command of Korvettenkapitän (KK—Corvette Captain) Rudolf Schering. The voyage was plagued by repeated engine problems that necessitated a stop for repairs at Plymouth, United Kingdom. While passing through the Bay of Biscay, the Germans encountered a barque that was short of water and food, which the Germans provided. This time, she passed through the Suez Canal on her way to East Asian waters. On 16 January 1879, the ship's bowsprit snapped in bad weather. The ship stopped in Aden for repairs, which took several days to complete. While on the way from Aden to Bombay on 26 January 1879, she collected deep-ocean temperature and salinity samples in conjunction with scientific expeditions conducted by the German frigate Gazelle and the British corvette HMS Challenger. Luise then stopped in Bombay and Calcutta, the first time the ports had been visited by a German warship. In Bombay, Schering and Diederichs met with local authorities and attended a reception held for Ulysses S. Grant, then on a world tour following the end of his presidency.

From Indian waters, Luise sailed to Singapore, arriving on 11 April. She proceeded on to Hong Kong, where she arrived in early May to replace her sister Freya. Shortly thereafter, the corvette Leipzig reached Hong Kong; her captain, Kapitän zur See (Captain at Sea) Carl Paschen, had been the senior officer of the East Asia Squadron by date of rank, but he was replaced in this position by Schering. At that time, the other German warships in the region included the gunboats Cyclop and Wolf. Schering had limited control over the other vessels, however, as each ship was directly controlled from the Admiralty and also subject to requests from Max von Brandt, the German ambassador to China. In June, Schering took Luise to Japanese waters, and while on the way on 5 June, a fire broke out in her engine room. The crew suppressed the fire quickly, but the poorly ventilated engine room could not be easily cleared of smoke, so Luise continued under sail alone. She visited a number of ports in southern Japan over the following months, including Nagasaki, Kobe, and Yokohama. In the latter port, she met the corvette SMS Prinz Adalbert, then on a training cruise, and not intended to operate with Schering's unit. The Germans again encountered Grant's entourage in Yokohama on 4 July. Luise then toured northern Japan, including a stop at Hakodate. In August she conducted additional deep-see tests in the Korea Strait.

By 1 September, Luise had arrived back in Chinese waters, stopping first at Chefoo. By that time, the ship was in need of repairs, and so on 20 October, she moved to Shanghai, where a British-operated dockyard was available. Once the work was done in late December, Schering decided to winter his vessel in Amoy, staying there from 30 December to 17 March 1880. A war scare between Qing China and Russia, which typically provoked anti-foreigner violence in China, prompted Brandt to request Luise's presence in Shanghai, which she reached on 23 March. She was joined in this task by Cyclop and Wolf. Not long after, the British had intervened to defuse the situation, and the ships' presence in northern China was no longer necessary. On 24 April, she sailed south for Hong Kong in anticipation of orders that were expected to arrive soon. These did not arrive until 1 July; Schering was directed to bring his ship home by way of the Cape of Good Hope, rather than the Suez Canal; he was also to visit Madagascar to support a diplomatic mission while on the way back to Germany. The ship got underway on 3 July, sailing first for Saigon in French Indochina to take on coal.

Luise arrived in Port Louise, Mauritius, on 9 August, and reached Madagascar soon thereafter. Anti-European sentiment was strong among the island's population in the context of French colonial ambitions, and they refused to recognize the German ambassador. Luise stopped in the main port at Tamatave, where Schering and five officers met with Prime Minister Rainilaiarivony on 16 August. Further negotiations were not possible with the government as a result of the approach of a very strong storm that forced Luise to leave the island immediately. She proceeded on to Simonstown to replenish her stock of coal before continuing. Two more stops, in the Cape Verde Islands and at Plymouth, saw additional coal taken on. She finally arrived in Wilhelmshaven on 9 November and after the crew completed work to deactivate the ship, she was decommissioned on 20 November. Over the course of her cruise abroad, Luise had repeatedly conducted experiments with her torpedoes. The crew routinely found them difficult to operate effectively, and subject to frequent failures of their delicate internal components, such as gyroscopes.

=== Training ship ===
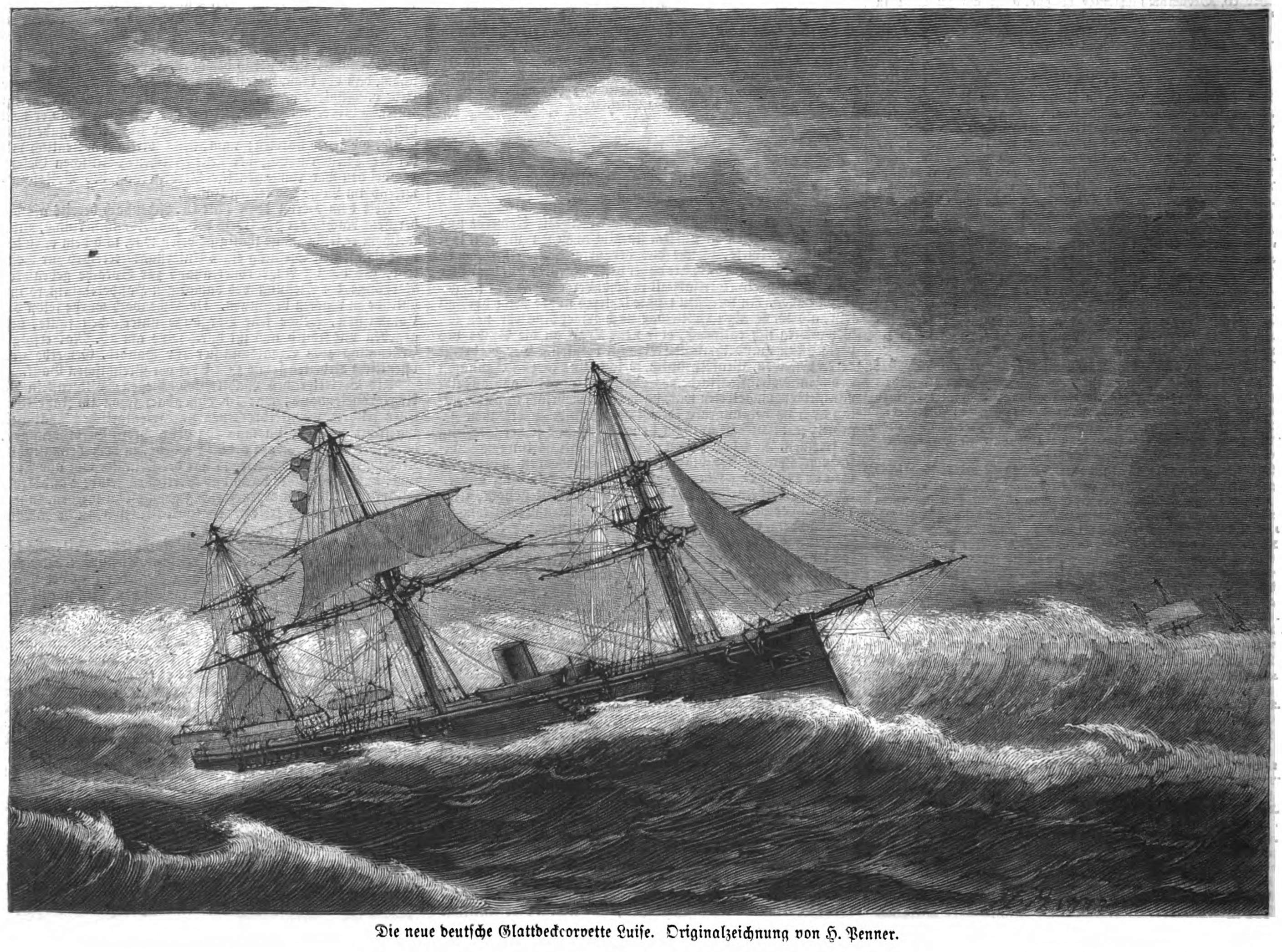
Illustration of Luise in heavy seas

Luise was converted into a training ship for Schiffsjungen (apprentice seamen) in early 1881, and she entered service in this role on 15 April, now under the command of KK Gustav Stempel. From 18 May to the middle of June, she conducted a training cruise in the Baltic Sea, and on 19 June she began a voyage to North, Central, and South America. She visited a number of ports, including Halifax, Canada, and Georgetown, British Guiana. She arrived back in Kiel on 4 September 1882, where she joined the fleet training exercises that were being conducted in the Baltic. She was decommissioned for the year on 25 September.

The ship had deteriorated in condition by this time, so in 1883 she was taken into the Kaiserliche Werft in Danzig for a thorough repair. This work lasted until February 1885, and on the 24th she was recommissioned to resume her training duties. Luise conducted a short set of trials outside Kiel before cruising in the Baltic starting on 11 May. The ship began another overseas cruise on 1 June, again to the Americas. On the way back from the tour, she stopped in Queenstown, Ireland, and then went to Cowes to represent Germany at a Royal Navy fleet review in 1886. She left Cowes on 10 August and visited Gravesend and Leith before arriving in Wilhelmshaven on 10 September.

On arrival in Wilhelmshaven, Luise received orders to carry replacement crews to the gunboats that were stationed in German West Africa, Cyclop and Habicht. She sailed to Douala, Kamerun to transfer the new crews, and arrived back in Wilhelmshaven on 26 January 1887. She was then formally re-designated as a school ship. Luise moved to Kiel on 10 February, where her crew was reduced. On 5 April, she had her crew replenished to resume training duties, and KK Wilhelm Büchsel took command of the vessel. She was present during the celebration of the beginning of construction of the Kaiser Wilhelm Canal in Kiel. She went on further cruises in German waters until 9 September; six days later she was decommissioned and assigned to the I. Reserve.

A month later on 15 October, Luise was reactivated to carry another set of replacement crews to the gunboats in West Africa. She reached Douala on 17 December, transferred the crews, and left ten days later, arriving back in Kiel on 18 February 1888. Two days later, she was again decommissioned and placed in the I. Reserve, which lasted until April, when she was recommissioned for another stint as a training ship. She cruised in the Baltic until 29 September, when she returned to Kiel for an overhaul. She spent the years 1890 and 1891 as a training ship; she also participated in those years' fleet maneuvers. KK Felix Stubenrauch captained the ship during the 1891 training cycle. Luise was converted into a hulk in 1891 and based in Kiel, serving in that capacity until 19 December 1896, when she was stricken from the naval register. During this period, she was also used as a torpedo test ship from late 1894 to 16 April 1896, and Kapitän zur See (Captain at Sea) Carl Wodrig commanded the ship. She was sold the following year and broken up in Hamburg.
