= Freyja (disambiguation) =

Freyja is a goddess in Norse mythology.

Freyja may also refer to:

- MV Millennial Spirit, a Moldovan chemical tanker formerly known as MV Freyja
- ICGV Freyja, an offshore patrol vessel of the Icelandic
- Freyja, British band of which Jo Freya is a member
- Freyja, a given name
- Freyja (missile system) - a pan-European anti-ballistic missile defense project

== See also ==
- Freia (disambiguation)
- Freja (disambiguation)
- Freya (disambiguation)
- Frøya (disambiguation)
