= Freya (given name) =

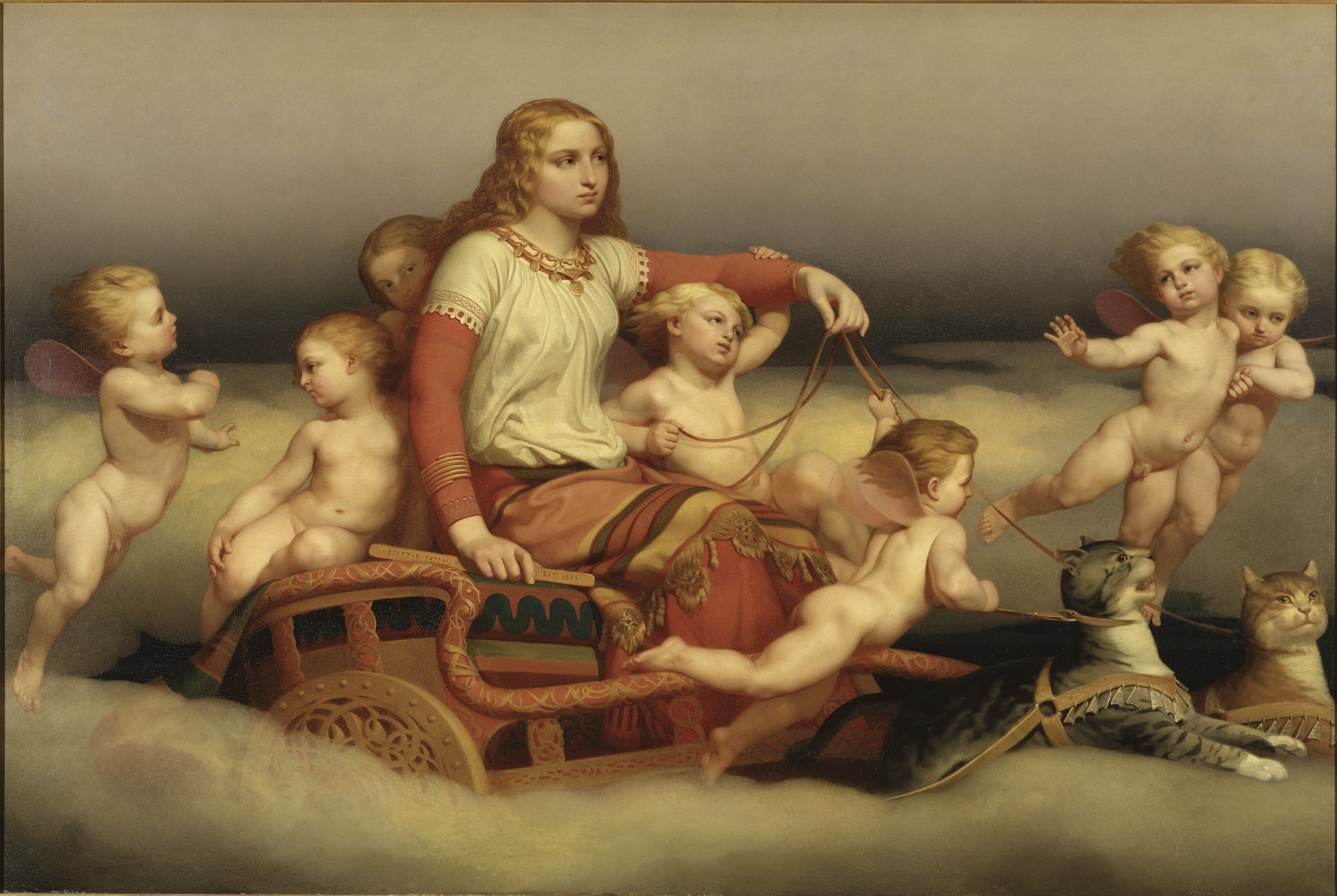
- The goddess Freyja depicted in a portrait by Nils Blommér.
- Pronunciation: /ˈfreɪ.ə/ FRAY-ə
- Gender: female

Origin
- Origin: Old Norse
- Meaning: "Lady"

Other names
- Related names: Freja, Frøya, Frida, Priya, Ffreuer, Freydis

Freya or Freyja is an Old Norse feminine given name derived from the name of the Old Norse word for noble lady (Freyja). The theonym of the goddess Freyja is thus considered to have been an epithet in origin, replacing a personal name that is now unattested. Another hypothesis suggests a possible cognate with Pratibha, from Sanskrit meaning "light".

Freya, along with its variants, has been a popular name in recent years in English-speaking countries, Germany, and Scandinavian countries.

== Notable people ==
- Freya Adams, American actress
- Freya Allan, English actress
- Freya Anderson, English freestyle swimmer
- Freya Aswynn, Dutch neopagan
- Freya Black (born 2001), British Olympic sailor
- Freya Blackwood, Australian Illustrator
- Freya Blekman, Dutch professor
- Audrey Freyja Clarke, Icelandic figure skater
- Freya Clausen, Danish singer/songwriter known also by the mononym Freya
- Freya Waley-Cohen (born 1989), British-American composer
- Freya Godfrey (born 2005), English footballer
- Freya Hoffmeister, German sea kayaker
- Freya Jayawardana, Indonesian singer and dancer known also member of Mataram royal family
- Freya Kemp (born 2005), English cricketer
- Freya Klier, German author and film director
- Freya Lim, Taiwanese singer
- Freya Manfred, American poet
- Freya Mathews, Australian philosopher and author
- Freya Mavor (born 1993), Scottish actress and model
- Freya North, English novelist
- Freya Ostapovitch (born 1956), Australian politician
- Freya Piryns, Belgian politician
- Freya Ridings, English singer-songwriter
- Freya Ross, Scottish long-distance runner
- Freya Stafford, Australian actress
- Freya Stark (1893–1993), Anglo-Italian explorer and travel writer
- Freya Tingley, Australian actress
- Freya Van den Bossche, Belgian Flemish politician
- Freya von Moltke (1911–2010), German anti-Nazi resistance group member

=== Fictional characters ===
- Princess Freya, character in the 2016 American fantasy action-adventure film, The Huntsman: Winter's War
- Freya Beauchamp, character in American television series based on the 2011 novel of the same name, Witches of East End
- Freya Crescent, main character in the 2000 video game, Final Fantasy IX
- Freya Gardner, character in the British television miniseries, The Politician's Husband
- Freya Mikaelson, re-occurring character from the American fantasy-drama television series, The Originals
- Freya Wilson, character from the BBC soap opera, Doctors
- Freya Wozniak, character from the Australian television soap opera, Neighbours
- Freya, daughter of Rothgar, character in 2008 action film, Outlander (film)

== Other ==
- Freya, a cat employed as Chief Mouser to the Cabinet Office from 2012 to 2014
