= Freia =

Freia may refer to:

- Freyja, a Norse goddess
- 76 Freia, a main belt asteroid
- Freia (chocolate), a Norwegian chocolate brand

== See also ==
- Freja (disambiguation)
- Freya (disambiguation)
- Freyja (disambiguation)
