= SMS Prinz Adalbert (1876) =

Screw corvette of the German Imperial Navy

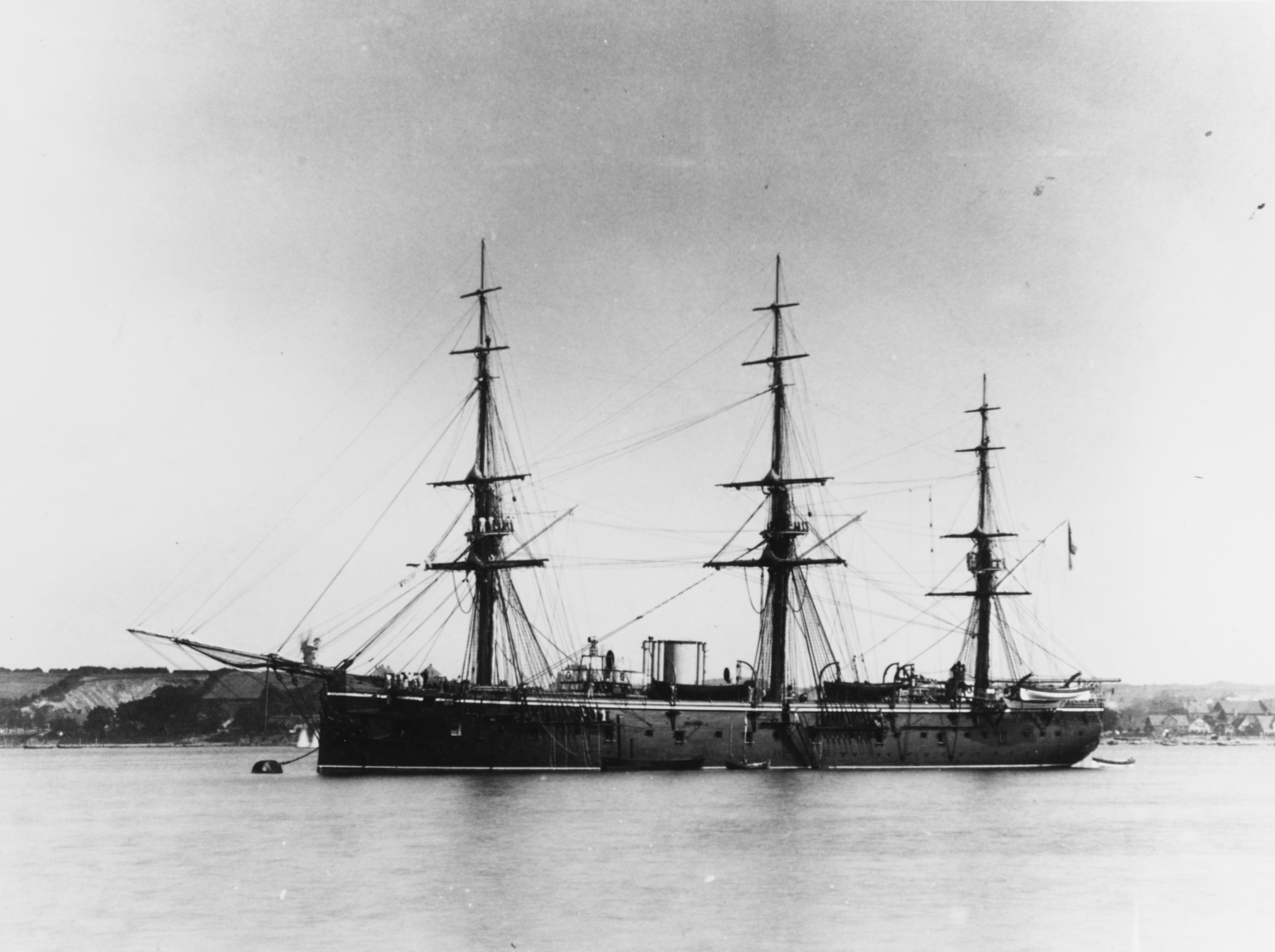
- Prinz Adalbert in Wilhelmshaven in the 1880s

History

German Empire
- Name: Prinz Adalbert
- Namesake: Prince Adalbert of Prussia
- Builder: AG Vulcan, Stettin
- Laid down: 1875
- Launched: 17 June 1876
- Commissioned: 1 September 1877
- Decommissioned: 20 September 1888
- Stricken: 6 May 1890
- Fate: Broken up, 1907

General characteristics
- Class & type: Leipzig-class corvette
- Displacement: Full load: 4,626 metric tons (4,553 long tons)
- Length: 87.5 m (287 ft 1 in) (loa)
- Beam: 14 m (45 ft 11 in)
- Draft: 6.2 m (20 ft 4 in)
- Installed power: 6 × fire tube boilers; 6,050 metric horsepower (5,970 ihp)
- Propulsion: 1 × marine steam engine; 1 × screw propeller
- Sail plan: Full ship rig
- Speed: 15.8 knots (29.3 km/h; 18.2 mph)
- Range: 2,330 nautical miles (4,320 km; 2,680 mi) at 10 kn (19 km/h; 12 mph)
- Crew: 39 officers; 386 sailors
- Armament: 2 × 17 cm (6.7 in) RK L/25 guns; 10 × 17 cm RK L/20 guns

SMS Prinz Adalbert was a steam corvette of the German Kaiserliche Marine (Imperial Navy), the second and final member of the Leipzig class. She was laid down in 1875 at the AG Vulcan shipyard in Stettin, was launched in June 1876, and was commissioned into the fleet in August 1877. Originally named Sedan after the Battle of Sedan of the Franco-Prussian War, she was renamed Prinz Adalbert to avoid antagonizing France in 1878, less than a decade after the battle.

Prinz Adalbert went on two overseas cruises during her career, both to East Asia. The first, from late 1878 to late 1880, was uneventful, though Prince Heinrich, the Kaiser's grandson, was aboard the ship as part of his naval training. The second cruise, from late 1883 to late 1885, was repeatedly altered; her voyage to East Asia was delayed by an order to carry Crown Prince Friedrich to Spain. Once she reached East Asia, she observed the Sino-French War of 1884, though she remained in the area for less than six months before being ordered home. The return voyage was delayed several times, first with orders to protect German interests in western South America, then to join a new cruiser squadron to settle a dispute with Zanzibar, once again to serve as the flagship of that squadron while the other vessel was being repaired, and again during a colonial dispute with Spain.

After Prinz Adalbert returned to Germany, she was converted into a training ship for naval cadets, a role she filled for less than three years. Worn out by 1888, she was decommissioned and reduced to a barracks ship, a role she filled until 1907, when she was stricken from the naval register and broken up in Rotterdam.

== Design ==
After the Franco-Prussian War of 1870–1871, the newly formed Kaiserliche Marine (Imperial Navy) began an expansion program to strengthen the fleet. The naval command determined that modern steam corvettes were necessary for scouting purposes, as well as overseas cruising duties to protect German interests abroad. The two Leipzig-class corvettes were ordered as part of the fleet plan of 1873, which called for a total of twenty unarmored corvettes, twelve of which were already either in service or under construction.

Prinz Adalbert was 87.5 meters (287 ft 1 in) long overall, with a beam of 14 m (45 ft 11 in) and a draft of 6.2 m (20 ft 4 in) forward. She displaced 4,626 metric tons (4,553 long tons) at full load. The ship's crew consisted of 39 officers and 386 enlisted men. She was powered by a single marine steam engine that drove one 2-bladed screw propeller, with steam provided by six coal-fired fire-tube boilers, which gave her a top speed of 15.8 knots (29.3 km/h; 18.2 mph) at 6,050 metric horsepower (5,970 ihp). She had a cruising radius of 2,330 nautical miles (4,320 km; 2,680 mi) at a speed of 10 knots (19 km/h; 12 mph). Prinz Adalbert was equipped with a full ship rig to supplement her steam engines on long-distance cruises.

Prinz Adalbert was armed with a battery of twelve 17 cm (6.7 in) breech-loading guns, two of which were 25-caliber (cal.); the other ten were shorter 20-cal. weapons. The two longer guns were on the upper deck as chase guns, one forward and one aft, and the rest were placed on the broadside. The ship also carried a pair of 8.8 cm (3.5 in) landing guns that could be taken ashore with a landing party. Later in her career, she had four 37 mm (1.5 in) Hotchkiss revolver cannon installed, along with four 35 cm (13.8 in) torpedo tubes. These were all above-water launchers, with two in the bow and one on each side.

== Service history ==
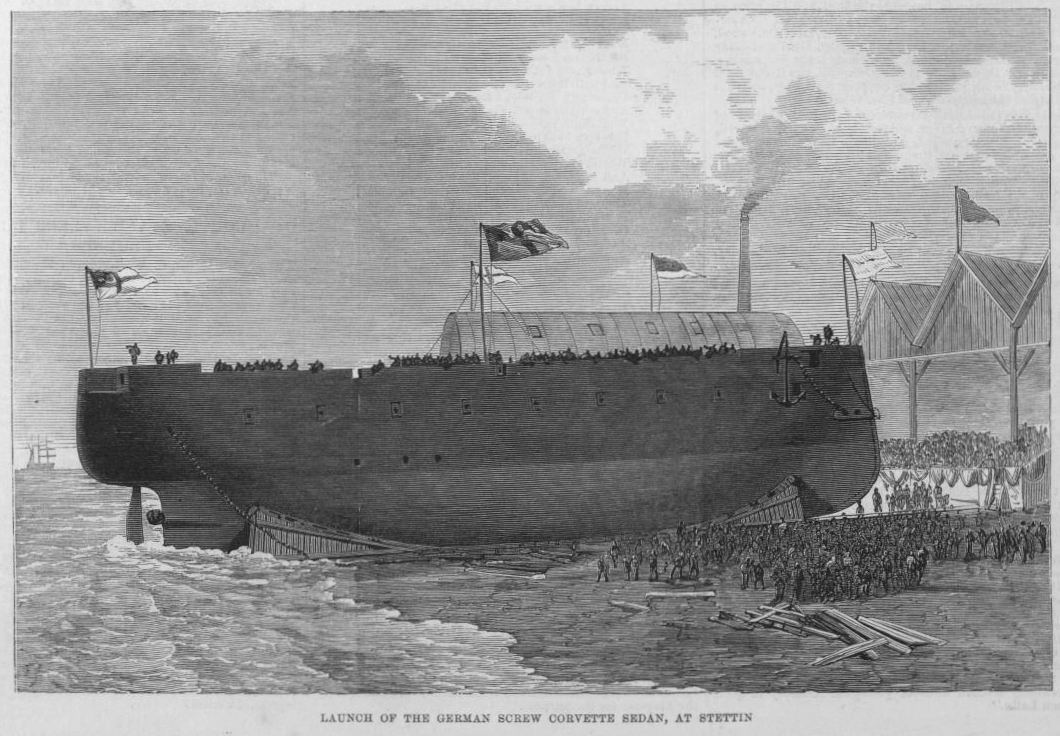
Launch of the German screw corvette Sedan, at Stettin, Illustrated London News

The keel for the second member of the Leipzig class was laid down in 1875, under the contract name "A", (Note: German warships were ordered under provisional names. Additions to the fleet were given a single letter; ships intended to replace older or lost vessels were ordered as "Ersatz (name of the ship to be replaced)".) at the AG Vulcan shipyard in Stettin. She was launched on 17 June 1876 and christened by Konteradmiral (KAdm—Rear Admiral) Ludwig von Henk as Sedan, after the Battle of Sedan of the Franco-Prussian War. The ship was completed the following year, and she was commissioned into the fleet on 1 September 1877. She was then moved to Kiel for final fitting-out, which included the installation of the four torpedo tubes, making Sedan the first large German warship to be equipped with them. On 1 September 1878, her name was changed to Prinz Adalbert after Prince Adalbert of Prussia, by order of the Kaiserliche Admiralität (Imperial Admiralty) so as to not offend France, since the French had been defeated at Sedan just eight years before.

Prinz Adalbert remained out of service in 1878 owing to a shortage of officers and crewmen, since the available men had been assigned to the Armored Squadron, which was on a training cruise. Following the sinking of the ironclad Grosser Kurfürst in an accidental collision in May, the cruise was cancelled and the ships returned to Germany; the crews from the ironclads that were then placed in reserve could then be used to commission Prinz Adalbert for an overseas deployment. Naval cadets from the 1877 crew year, which included Prince Heinrich, were taken aboard for the cruise. Heinrich was briefly accompanied by his brother Wilhelm while the ship was in German waters.

=== First overseas deployment ===
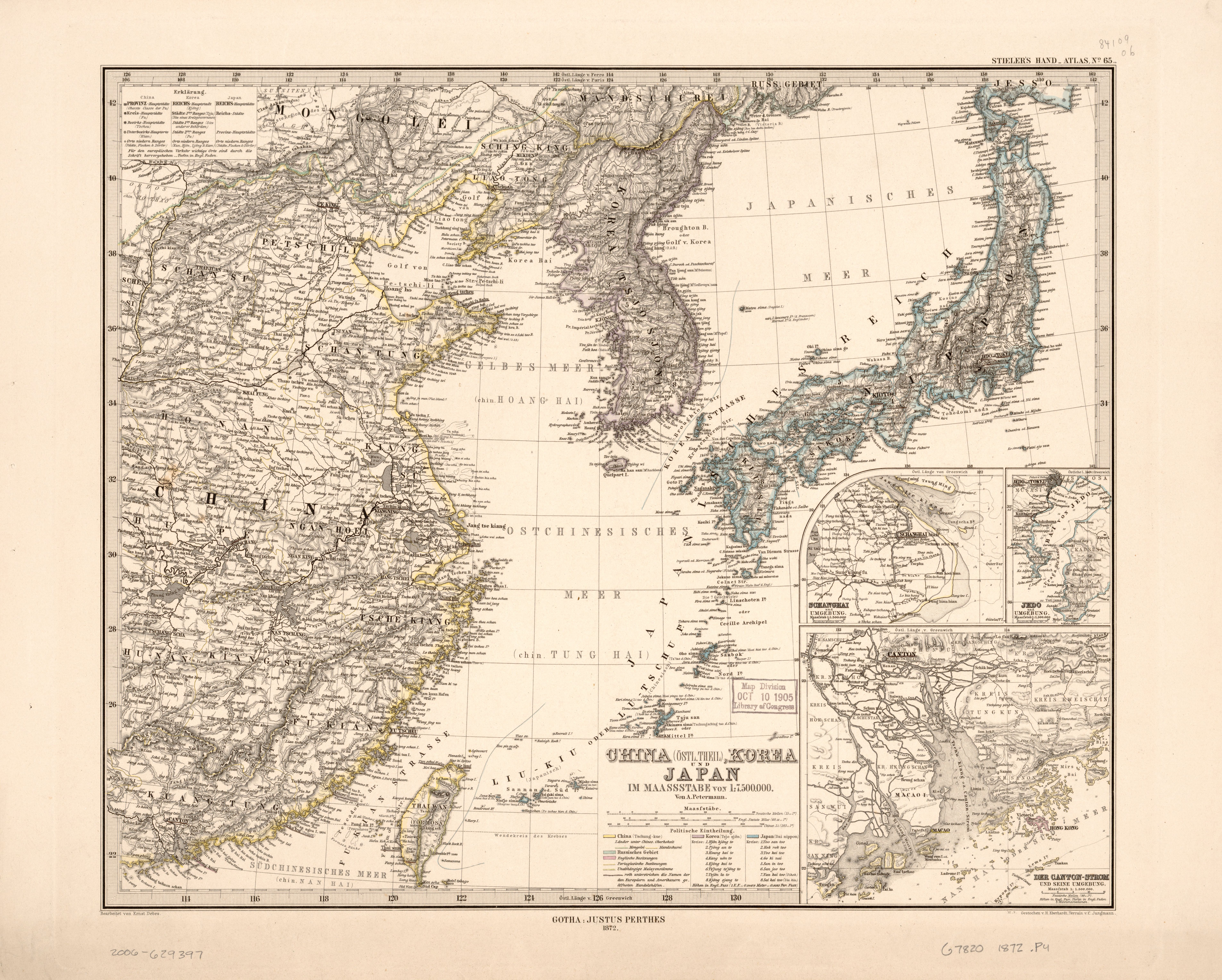
German 1872 map of China, Japan, and Korea

On 14 October 1878, the ship left Kiel, bound for East Asia, under the command of Kapitän zur See (KzS—Captain at Sea) Archibald MacLean. She sailed south through the Atlantic Ocean, around South America, passed through the Strait of Magellan and crossed the Pacific Ocean. Prinz Adalbert arrived in Japan in May 1879, and MacLean, having the earliest date of rank of the captains in East Asia, became the squadron commander. At the time, the East Asia Squadron also included the corvette Luise and the gunboats Wolf and Cyclop. Prinz Adalbert then began a tour of Japanese and Russian ports, at times in company with Luise. Prinz Adalbert remained in Japanese waters into early 1880, and visited a number of cities, include Kobe, Nagasaki, and Yokohama.

Unrest in China threatened German interests, particularly around Shanghai, but Prinz Adalbert had too deep a draft to allow her to operate in the area, so only Luise, Wolf, and Cyclop were available to protect Germans in the city. Prinz Adalbert therefore remained in Hong Kong from May to June. While in Hong Kong, MacLean received word that the steam frigate Vineta had arrived in Japan to replace Prinz Adalbert, though at the time, the latter's crew was battling a severe gastrointestinal disease. It was hoped that the fresh air of the high seas would help the crew return to health, so Prinz Adalbert began the voyage back to Germany.

She passed through the Dutch East Indies, stopping in the Sultanate of Johor, before transiting the Indian Ocean. She stopped in Simonstown, South Africa, and the island of Saint Helena, where the crew visited the tomb of Napoleon. The ship finally arrived in the Kieler Förde on 29 September 1880, where she was greeted by Kaiser Wilhelm I, Prince Heinrich's grandfather, and Admiral Albrecht von Stosch, the chief of the Admiralität. Since the voyage had gone so well, Stosch promoted MacLean to the rank of Konteradmiral; the ship's first officer, Kapitänleutnant (KL—Lieutenant Captain) Albert von Seckendorff, was also promoted.

=== Second overseas deployment ===
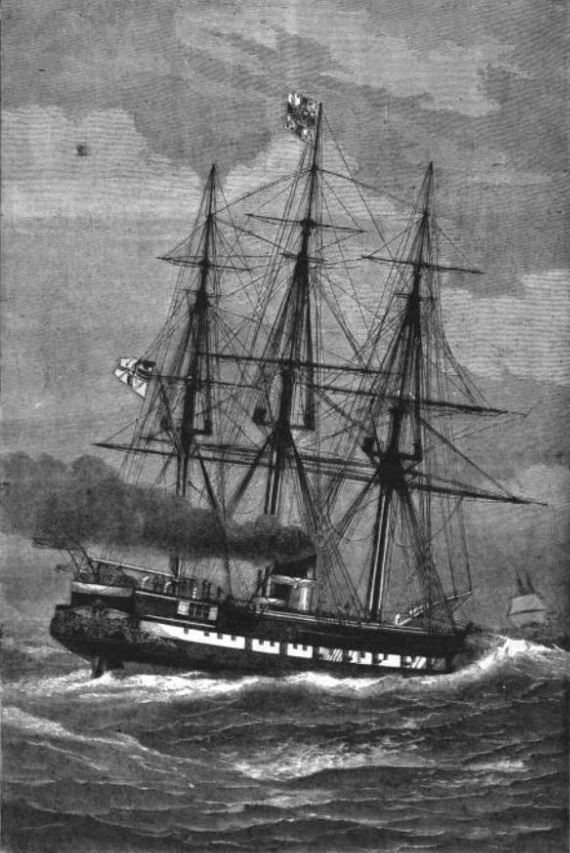
Sketch of Prinz Adalbert at sea, c. 1884

Prinz Adalbert remained out of service until 1883, when she was reactivated for another foreign deployment. Before she began the cruise, however, she was ordered to carry the Crown Prince, Frederick, from Genoa, Italy for a visit to Spain. She left Kiel on 20 October, and on 19 November, Frederick boarded the ship in Genoa. Prinz Adalbert was joined by the corvette Sophie and the old aviso Loreley for the trip to Spain. Severe storms battered the ships on the voyage to and from Spain. The flotilla arrived in Spanish waters on 24 November, where they remained until 15 December. While they were there, Loreley was detached to repair storm damage at Malta on 14 December. The next day, Prinz Adalbert and Sophie left to return to Genoa, where they arrived on 16 December and disembarked Frederick. From there, Prinz Adalbert was able to embark on the overseas cruise to East Asia for which she had been activated.

She arrived in Singapore on 24 April 1884, where she replaced her sister ship Leipzig. Prinz Adalbert then steamed to Shanghai, where she rendezvoused with the squadron flagship, the corvette Stosch, and its commander, KzS Carl Paschen. In mid-May, a fever epidemic broke out among the crews of the German ships, prompting Paschen to take the vessels to Japan to receive treatment, but in July, Prinz Adalbert and Stosch had to return to Chinese waters owing to increase in tensions that led to the Sino-French War the following month. The ships stayed in Shanghai until late August, when Paschen ordered Prinz Adalbert to sail to Fuzhou. The French squadron under Vice Admiral Amédée Courbet was preparing to attack the Chinese fleet there, and Prinz Adalbert joined warships from Britain and the United States to protect Europeans and Americans in the city. In the ensuing Battle of Fuzhou, the French rapidly defeated the Chinese forces, allowing Prinz Adalbert to return to Shanghai in early September.

Shortly thereafter, she received orders to return to Germany. She left Shanghai and stopped in Japan and Papeete, Tahiti en route to South America. Prinz Adalbert arrived in Callao, Peru on 11 January 1885; here her voyage to Germany was interrupted with a change of orders. A conflict between Colombia and Nicaragua threatened German interests, prompting the German naval command to send Prinz Adalbert there to protect Germans in the area. She remained there for two months, before steaming south to Valparaíso, Chile, where she stayed from 21 to 28 March. From there she resumed her voyage back to Germany, and after rounding Cape Horn and entering the Atlantic, she arrived in Montevideo on 7 May. There, she again received new orders, diverting the ship to Mauritius, where she was to join a new cruiser squadron, again led by Paschen aboard Stosch.

Paschen's new squadron was tasked with settling the dispute between Germany and Zanzibar over the protectorate of Wituland in eastern Africa. After the squadron was assembled in Mauritius, the ships proceeded to Zanzibar, where they quickly convinced the Sultan of Zanzibar to drop his objections to the protectorate. This allowed the squadron to be dissolved and Prinz Adalbert to resume her voyage home. She was again delayed, however, as Stosch was in need of maintenance, and so Paschen transferred to Prinz Adalbert while the former was in the dry dock in Cape Town. Prinz Adalbert went to the recently acquired colony of Kamerun so Paschen, who had been promoted to the rank of Konteradmiral, could examine conditions there. In late November, Prinz Adalbert met with Stosch in Freetown; Paschen returned to his flagship, and the two ships steamed to Cape Verde to join the Training Squadron, which had stopped there during a dispute between Germany and Spain over the Caroline Islands. After Pope Leo XIII intervened to settle the dispute, Prinz Adalbert could finally resume the voyage back to Germany, where she arrived in Wilhelmshaven on 22 December.

=== Training ship ===
Shortly after her return to Wilhelmshaven, Prinz Adalbert was placed in the I. Reserve with a reduced crew. The navy decided to convert the vessel into a training ship, and she was reactivated for that role on 8 April 1886 with a crew of naval cadets and four-year volunteers aboard. The ship's commander at this time was KzS Iwan Oldekop. Prinz Adalbert began a series of short training cruises in the Baltic Sea to familiarize the crew with the ship before she joined the Training Squadron. The squadron participated in fleet exercises from 20 July to 15 August. Following the conclusion of the exercises, the Training Squadron embarked on a major cruise to the West Indies, departing Wilhelmshaven on 14 October. The ships were in Saint Thomas at the start of 1887, and on the way back to Germany, Prinz Adalbert collided with the Hamburg-flagged schooner Ellenholt, though she was not seriously damaged in the accident. The Training Squadron returned to Wilhelmshaven on 30 March, where Prinz Adalbert went into the Kaiserliche Werft (Imperial Shipyard) for repairs.

Prinz Adalbert began the 1887 training schedule on 5 May with another contingent of cadets and four-year volunteers, again with familiarization cruises in the Baltic. On 3 June, she was present at the celebration marking the beginning of construction of the Kaiser Wilhelm Canal. In August, the squadron participated in the fleet maneuvers as II. Division. The winter training cruise began on 1 October; the ships were to have gone into the Mediterranean Sea, but an outbreak of cholera in Italy led to the trip being limited to Cape Verde and the Canary Islands. The squadron arrived back in Wilhelmshaven on 10 April 1888. The normal training routine for the year was interrupted in July, when the Training Squadron and the Maneuver Squadron were sent to accompany the new Kaiser, Wilhelm II, on a visit to Scandinavian ports from 2 to 31 July. This was to be Prinz Adalbert's last cruise, and she was forced to depart early for badly needed repairs.

=== Later career ===
Prinz Adalbert was worn out from her long overseas deployments by 1888, and after just ten years in active service, she was retired from training duties on 20 September. On 6 May 1890, Prinz Adalbert was stricken from the naval register and thereafter converted into a barracks ship, based in Wilhelmshaven. She served in that capacity until 1907, when she was sold for scrap on 7 June. The ship was broken up later that year in Rotterdam, the Netherlands. Her figurehead is preserved at the Naval Academy Mürwik. Curiously, the ship was never renamed, despite the christening of the armored cruiser Prinz Adalbert in 1901.
