= SMS Freya =

Two ships of the German Kaiserliche Marine (Imperial Navy) have been named SMS Freya:

- SMS Freya (1874), a screw corvette launched in 1874
- SMS Freya (1897), a protected cruiser launched in 1897
