= Frøya =

Frøya may refer to:

== Places ==
- Frøya Municipality, a municipality in Trøndelag county, Norway
- Frøya (island), an island within Frøya Municipality in Trøndelag county, Norway
- Frøya Tunnel, an undersea tunnel connecting the islands of Frøya and Hitra in Trøndelag county, Norway
- Frøya, Bremanger, an island in Bremanger Municipality in Vestland county, Norway
- Frøya Church, a church in Bremanger Municipality in Norway

== Sports ==
- Frøya Ambassadors, a Norwegian basketball team
- Frøya FK, a Norwegian association football club from Frøya, Trøndelag
- Frøya official football team, the official association football team of Frøya in Trøndelag, Norway

== Other ==
- Frøya Sjursæther (born 2006), Norwegian politician
- HNoMS Frøya, a minelayer ship in the Norwegian Navy
- Frøya or Freyja (disambiguation), a Norse goddess
