= Freja =

Freja is a female given name of Scandinavian origin. It comes from Freyja, a goddess in Norse mythology.

== Notable people ==
- Freja Abildå (born 1998), Danish association football player
- Freja Cohrt (born 1994), Danish handball player
- Freja Beha Erichsen (born 1987), Danish fashion model
- Freja Olofsson, Swedish footballer
- Freja Ryberg (1832–1920), Finnish actress

== Other ==
- Freja (satellite), a Swedish satellite
- Freja Fjord, Greenland
- HDMS Freja, ships of the Royal Danish Navy
- Randers Sportsklub Freja, a Danish sport club
- Cheritra freja, a butterfly found in India

== See also ==
- Freia (disambiguation)
- Freya (disambiguation)
- Freyja (disambiguation)
