= Pratibha =

- Gender: Female
- Language: Sanskrit

Origin
- Meaning: "genius" "ingenuity" "light" "intelligence" "splendour"
- Region of origin: India

Other names
- Related names: Protiva

Pratibha (Sanskrit: प्रतिभा, romanized: Pratibhā) is a Hindu Sanskrit Indian feminine given name, which means "genius", "ingenuity", "light", "intelligence", and "splendour".

== Notable people named Pratibha ==
- Pratibha Patil (born 1934), 12th President of India
- Pratibha Ray (born 1943), Indian academic and writer
- Pratibha Satpathy (born 1945), Indian poet
- Pratibha Singhi (born 1951), Indian pediatric neurologist
- Pratibha Parmar (born 1955), British director, producer and writer
- Pratibha Nandakumar (born 1955), Indian poet, journalist, feminist, columnist and activist
- Pratibha Singh (born 1956), Indian politician and member of the parliament
- Pratibha Rani (born 1956), Indian judge
- K. Pratibha Bharati (born 1956), Indian politician
- Pratibha Shukla (born 1960), Indian politician and member of legislative assembly
- Pratibha Prahlad (born 1962), Indian dancer and choreographer
- Pratibha Sinha (born 1969), Indian-Nepalese actress
- Pratibha Dhanorkar (born 1986), Indian politician and member of legislative assembly
- Pratibha Ranta (born 2000), Indian actress
- Pratibha Gai, British microscopist
- Pratibha Paul, Indian actress
- Pratibha Advani, Indian talk show host, anchor and producer
- Pratibha Singh Baghel, Indian singer

== See also ==
- Pratibha Mahila Sahakari Bank, an Indian cooperative bank founded by Pratibha Patil
- Pratibha cauvery, an oil tanker that ran aground when cyclone Nilam made landfall
- Rajkiya Pratibha Vikas Vidyalaya, an Indian system of schools run by the Directorate of Education, Government of Delhi
- Valmiki-Pratibha, an Indian opera created by Rabindranath Tagore
- Hello Pratibha, an Indian television drama show which aired on Zee TV
