= Freya Blekman =

Dutch researcher

- Born: Netherlands
- Education: University of Amsterdam (MSc, PhD)
- Scientific career
- Fields: Experimental particle physics
- Workplaces: Deutsches Elektronen-Synchrotron (DESY); University of Hamburg; Vrije Universiteit Brussel; Imperial College London (postdoc); Cornell University (postdoc)
- Thesis: Measurement of the top quark pair production cross section in the all-hadronic channel with the Dzero experiment
- Website: https://www.freyablekman.net/

Freya Blekman is a Dutch professor at the University of Hamburg and the lead scientist at Deutsches Elektronen-Synchrotron (DESY). She contributed to the discovery of the Higgs boson at CERN and has been endowed the Helmholtz Distinguished Professorship. Her individual work specializes in the physics and experimental aspects of elementary particles and fields, specifically looking at the top quark sector by using precision measurements.

== Early life and education ==
Blekman was born in the Netherlands. She grew up with a relatively arts and social-sciences focused family. Her grandmother was more math-oriented, but was forced to quit studying after high school to support her brother. This event pushed Blekman to go to university herself and pursue the sciences.

As an undergraduate, she was a part of the University of Amsterdam Science Fair team that presented their experiments during the CERN 40th anniversary event in 1994, jumpstarting her future career at the company. While originally studying biology, Blekman ran into her physics teacher in the streets which convinced her to switch to studying physics. Following this undergraduate degree in physics, she received a Masters of Science at the University of Amsterdam in 2000 on R&D for the LHCb experiment at CERN. In 2005, she received her PhD at the University of Amsterdam, although most of the research was based at the D0 experiment at Fermilab in the United States. Her thesis addressed the measurement of top quark pair production in the all-hadronic channel using the D0 experiment.

== Career and research ==
After receiving her PhD Blekman joined the Compact Muon Solenoid (CMS) experiment in 2005 as a postdoctoral researcher at Imperial College London from 2005 to 2007 and Cornell University from 2007 to 2010. As the only woman among 100 people at Imperial College London, Blekman focused on CMS software and triggers, particle flow, and tau identification. At Cornell she researched pixel detector commissioning and measuring of the top quark pair production cross section using the Large Hadron Collider (LHC), which was turning on for the first time.

Following her postdoc Blekman was an assistant professor at Vrije Universiteit Brussel from 2010 to 2014 before becoming an associate professor until 2018. She then became a full-time professor of Vrije from 2019 to 2021, where she researched physics beyond the standard model in the top sector. During her academic career, Blekman was a member of many notable societies, including the German Physical Society, Institute of Physics (UK), and Belgian and Dutch physics societies.

Blekman made considerable contributions within the team that worked to answer questions about dark matter, gravitational waves, quantum theories, and the physics of the Higgs-Boson. Blekman and her team at CERN discovered the new standard model of the Higgs-Boson, earning them the Science Magazine Breakthrough of the Year Award in 2012.

Blekman has led multiple large physics groups throughout her life. The most prominent international research team lead was her creation of the physics outreach activities of the CMS Collaboration, where she currently still holds the role as the first Physics Communication Officer. Within this role, Blekman is responsible for outreach and communication of 4000+ international scientists at CERN that publish 130+ scientific papers per year. She also holds the role as the convener of the "Beyond-Two-Generations" (B2G) physics group, which has over 250 members worldwide and has published over 60 journals. The group works to analyze new particles using heavy quarks and W/Z/H bosons.

Since 2021 Blekman has been a lead scientist at Deutsches Elektronen-Synchrotron (DESY) with joint appointment at the University of Hamburg via the Helmholtz Distinguished Professor Recruitment Initiative. In addition to full-time professorship, Blekman is also a visiting professor at Vrije Universiteit Brussel and the University of Oxford. Her future work includes searching for signs of new physics by using the Large Hadron Collider (LHC) and the Future Circular e+e- Collider (FCC-ee) at CERN.

=== Publications ===
Blekman has a Hirsh index of 210 with over 1500 published works. The majority of her published work is within CMS or D0 collaboration. Her works currently have 62,439 citations. The most cited are:

- Chatrchyan, S., et al. (2012). Observation of a new boson at a mass of 125 GeV with the CMS experiment at the LHC. Physics Letters. Part B, 716(1), 30–61. https://doi.org/10.1016/j.physletb.2012.08.021
- The CMS Collaboration. (2008). The CMS experiment at the CERN LHC. Journal of Instrumentation: An IOP and SISSA Journal, 3(08), S08004–S08004. https://doi.org/10.1088/1748-0221/3/08/s08004

Individually produced papers:

- Blekman, F. (2005). Top Quark Pair Production in Proton Anti-Proton Collisions. OSTI.GOV. https://doi.org/10.2172/15017276
- Blekman, F. (2012). Search for same-sign top production at the LHC. Societa Italiana di Fisica. 173–176. https://doi.org/10.1393/ncc/i2012-11241-6
- Blekman, F. (2013). Measurement of the top pair invariant mass distribution and search for New Physics (CMS). Proceedings of Science. https://doi.org/10.22323/1.174.0212
- Blekman, F. (2007). Studies for Semileptonic B Decays from B0. Proceedings of Science. https://doi.org/10.22323/1.021.0208
- Blekman, F. (2007). Measurement of inclusive differential cross sections for Upsilon(1S) production in ppbar collisions at \sqrt s=1.96 TeV. Proceedings of Science. https://doi.org/10.22323/1.021.0234

=== Honors and awards ===
- 2011 – Odysseus II Grant by the Flemish funding agency FWO
- 2012 – Science Magazine/Breakthrough of the Year 2012 Award (for discovery of Higgs Boson)
- 2013 – USA Department of Energy LHC Physics Center Fellow
- 2013 – European Physics Society High Energy and Particle Physics (HEPP) prize for discovery of Higgs-boson (for CMS collaboration)
- 2016 – Jaarprijs Science Communication award of the Royal Flemish Academy of Belgium for the Arts and Sciences (KVAB) for promotion of particle physics on social media
- 2019 – European Physics Society High Energy and Particle Physics (HEPP) prize for physics of the Top quark (for D0 collaboration)
- 2019 – 2021 – USA Department of Energy LHC Physics Center Senior Distinguished Researcher
- 2021 – Helmholtz Distinguished Professorship

=== Memberships ===
- 1999 – Member of CERN student program
- 1999 – Chairperson of ATLAS-Canada Standing Review Committee, Natural Sciences and Engineering Research Council of Canada (NSERC), and Canada IPPP Durham Advisory Board
- 2016 – 2019 – Member and co-chairperson of the CMS publication committee on Supersymmetry
- 2014 – 2018 – President of the PR and Outreach Council, VUB Faculty of Science and Bioengineering
- 2016 – 2018 – Co-convener of the Top physics group for the future electron-positron collider FCC-ee study
- 2012–present – Convener of Beyond-Two-Generations (B2G) physics group
- 2018–present – First ever CMS Physics Communication Officer
- 2021–present – Lead Scientist at DESY

== Social media coverage ==
Blekman was very active on X under the username @freyablekman, where she shared advancements in her work on particle physics, and since 2024 with the same username on bsky and mastodon. She was also featured at CERN in a YouTube series about the hadron collider restart in 2015. This promotion of particle physics on social media won her the Jaarprijs Science Communication award of the Royal Flemish Academy of Belgium for the Arts and Sciences (KVAB) in 2016.
