= American Spirit Foundation =

Nonprofit organization

The American Spirit Foundation was a foundation sponsored by United States entertainment figures to "enlist the entertainment industry's leadership, creativity and resources in developing and applying creative solutions to critical challenges facing America."

== History ==
The foundation was founded in 1989 by the actor James Stewart and convicted drug dealer and securities felon Peter F. Paul. The foundation concentrated on both the development of education programs for public schools in the U.S. and the support of democracy movements in the former Soviet Union and Eastern bloc.

In its European activities, the foundation worked with the interdisciplinary studies director of the Smithsonian Institution, Russian president Boris Yeltsin and Polish President Lech Wałęsa.

Stewart served as honorary chair of the Foundation.

== Spirit of America Awards ==
The Foundation gave its Spirit of America Awards to people from all professions whose "lives and careers demonstrated the vitality and success of those principles upon which the American Dream is based." Thirty people received the award, including Muhammad Ali, Jaime Escalante, Yo Yo Ma, Bob Hope, Helen Hayes, Ronald Reagan, Irene Dunne, Richard O. Anderson, Roy Campanella, Buzz Aldrin, Rafer Johnson, George Argyros, Ernest Hahn, Howard Finster, Michael Crawford, Boris Yeltsin, and Lew Wasserman.

== Events ==
The Entertainers for Education project was launched at the Fourth Spirit of America Awards Gala in Beverly Hills, December 13, 1990.
