= American Spirit (schooner) =

Schooner in Washington DC, USA

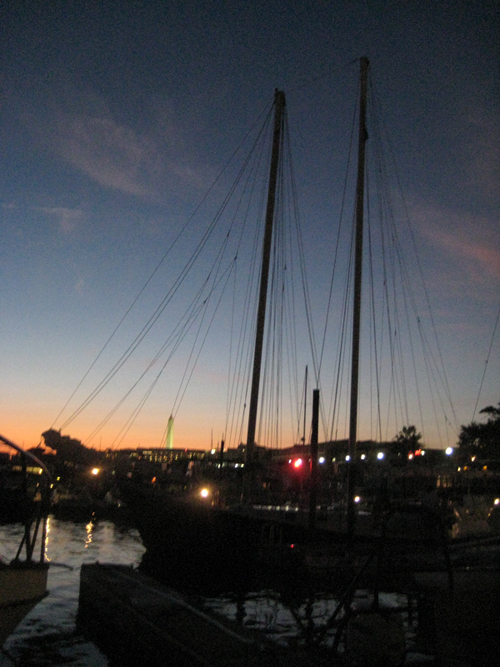
- The American Spirit at dock at Gangplank Marina in Washington, D.C., on July 2, 2010.

History
- Name: American Spirit
- Owner: National Maritime Heritage Foundation
- Builder: Eldredge Welding Co. (hull no. 14)
- Laid down: 1991
- Homeport: Washington, D.C.
- Identification: Call sign: WDC6433; USCG Doc. No.: 971994
- Notes: Formerly Freya

General characteristics
- Type: Schooner
- Tonnage: 21 GT; 19 NT
- Length: 65 ft (20 m)
- Beam: 16.7 ft (5.1 m)
- Draft: 5.2 ft (1.6 m)
- Propulsion: Sails/inboard engine
- Sail plan: Gaff-rigged
- Complement: 35 passengers + crew

American Spirit is a 65-foot (20 m) gaff-rigged, steel-hulled schooner. She is owned and operated by the National Maritime Heritage Foundation in Washington, D.C. and is used as a "floating classroom" for teaching District of Columbia-area students about sailing and maritime history. American Spirit is also used for excursion cruises and private charters.

== Freya ==
The schooner was built on Cape Cod in 1991 by Steve Eldridge to designs by Frank Meigs of Brewster, Massachusetts. Meigs and his wife, Elaine, named the schooner Freya (the second vessel they owned by that name) and sailed her out of Sesuit Harbor (East Dennis, Massachusetts) and Islamorada, Florida as a charter vessel until she was listed for sale in the spring of 2003.

== See also ==
- List of historical schooners
