= National Maritime Heritage Foundation =

501(c)(3) non-profit organization

- Founded: 2000
- Type: Educational
- Location: 236 Massachusetts Avenue NE, Suite 410, Washington, D.C. 20002, United States
- Region served: Washington Metropolitan Area
- Key people: Jim Muldoon, Chairman of the Board of Directors
- Website: www.nmhf.org

The National Maritime Heritage Foundation (NMHF) is a 501(c)(3) non-profit organization that manages community sailing and maritime education programs in Washington, D.C. In September 2009, the NMHF formally proposed a "National Naval and Maritime Museum" that would be built in Washington, D.C. The NMHF is in no way connected to the Naval Historical Foundation (NHF), the official U.S. Navy-endorsed group that raises private funds in support of the National Museum of the U.S. Navy (U.S. Navy Museum) in Washington, D.C.

== National Naval and Maritime Museum ==
On September 18, 2009, the NMHF formally proposed the establishment of a public-private partnership to raise an estimated $205 million to build a 150,000-square-foot (13,935 m^{2}) museum in Washington, D.C., devoted to the history of the United States Navy and the maritime history of the United States. To further the proposal, the NMHF joined with U.S. Navy Memorial Foundation, the U.S. Naval Institute and the Navy League. As of March 28, 2010, Naval History & Heritage Command has yet to make a decision on the proposal.

== Sailing programs ==
=== Youth programs ===
The NMHF manages sailing programs for District of Columbia-area youth including "Kids Set Sail," "National Capital High School Sailing," and "Learn to Sail."

=== DC Sail ===
DC Sail burgee.

DC Sail is a community sailing program for adults that provides sailing lessons, boat rentals, and racing on the Anacostia River, Washington Channel, and Potomac River. DC Sail was designated as a separate program of the National Maritime Heritage Foundation in 2010 and is overseen by a Sailing Director, Sailors Advisory Group, and executive board.

=== Schooner American Spirit ===
American Spirit is a 65-foot (20 m) schooner that is owned and operated by the NMHF. The schooner is used as a "floating classroom" and for excursion cruises and private charters.

=== Cantina Cup ===
Since 2008, the NMHF has hosted an annual sailboat race held in October on the Washington Channel and Potomac River. More than 100 sailors participated in 2009. The race takes its name from the Cantina Marina, an event partner located on the Washington Channel.
