= HDMS Freja =

The following ships of the Royal Danish Navy have borne the name HDMS Freja:

- HDMS Freja (1938) a survey ship launched in 1938 and decommissioned in 1967
- HDMS Freja (P521) a Diana-class patrol vessel launched in 2006
