= SMS Freya (1874) =

Screw corvette of the Prussian and German Imperial Navy

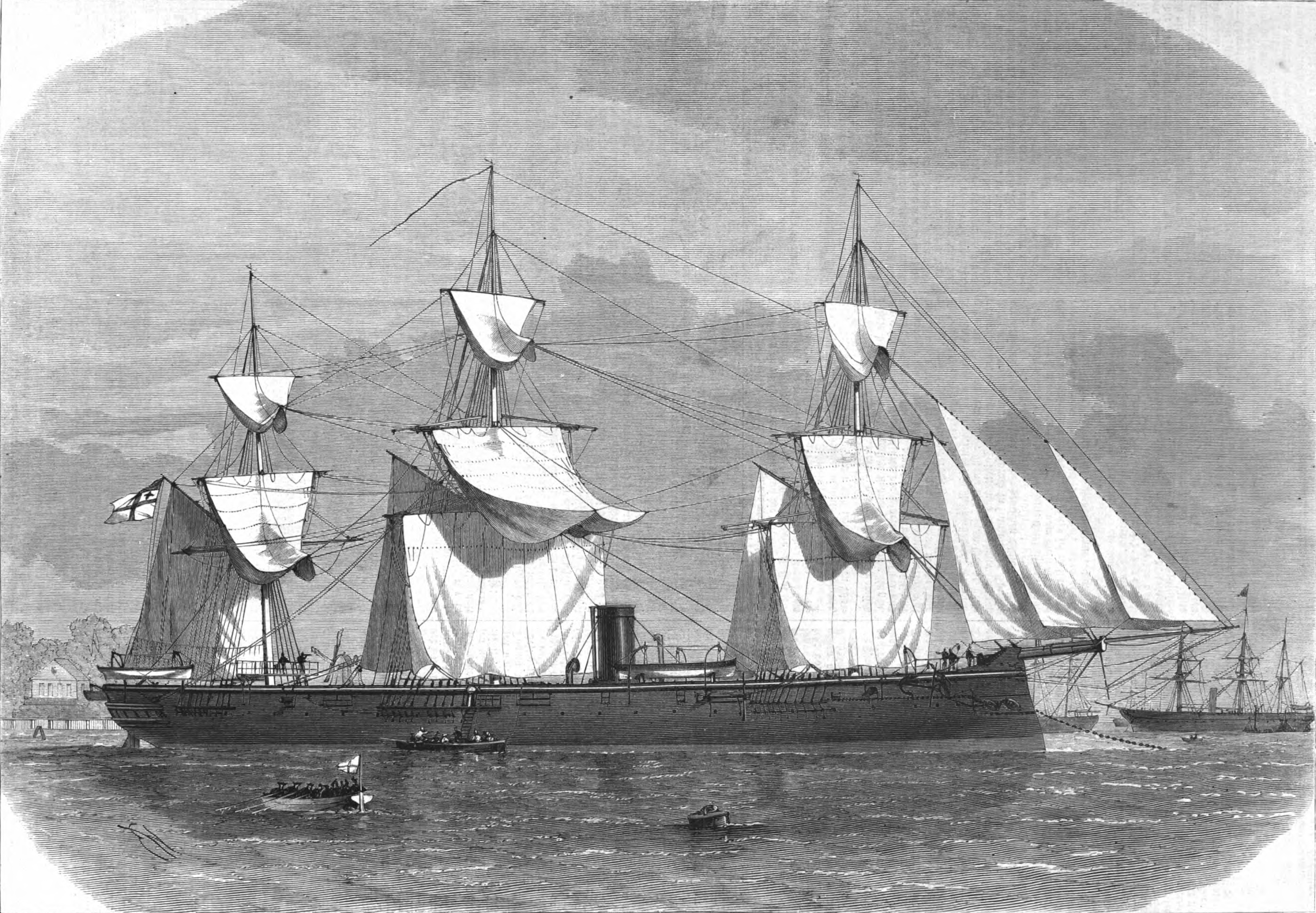
- Illustration of her sister ship Ariadne; Freya was similar but longer

History

German Empire
- Name: Freya
- Namesake: Freya
- Builder: Kaiserliche Werft, Danzig
- Laid down: 1872
- Launched: 29 December 1874
- Commissioned: 1 October 1876
- Decommissioned: 17 January 1888
- Stricken: 14 December 1896
- Fate: Broken up, 1897

General characteristics
- Class & type: Ariadne-class corvette
- Displacement: Full load: 2,406 metric tons (2,368 long tons)
- Length: 85.35 meters (280 ft 0 in) (loa)
- Beam: 10.8 m (35 ft 5 in)
- Draft: 4.6 m (15 ft 1 in)
- Installed power: 4 × fire-tube boilers; 2,801 metric horsepower (2,763 ihp)
- Propulsion: 1 × marine steam engine; 1 × screw propeller
- Sail plan: Full-rigged ship
- Speed: 15.2 knots (28.2 km/h; 17.5 mph)
- Range: 2,500 nautical miles (4,600 km; 2,900 mi) at 10 kn (19 km/h; 12 mph)
- Crew: 12 officers; 220 sailors
- Armament: 8 × 15 cm (5.9 in) guns; 4 × 17 cm (6.7 in) guns

SMS Freya was a steam corvette of the German Kaiserliche Marine (Imperial Navy). She was the third member of the Ariadne class, which included two other ships, Ariadne and Luise. Ordered as part of a large naval expansion program after the Austro-Prussian War, she was laid down in 1872 after the Franco-Prussian War. She was launched in December 1874 and completed in October 1876. Freya was built to a different design than her sisters, being longer and carrying a heavier battery of twelve guns.

The ship went on two major overseas cruises in her career,. The first of which was from 1877 to 1879, and the second immediately after from 1879 to 1881; both were fairly uneventful. On the first cruise, she went to the eastern Mediterranean Sea and then to China as part of the East Asia Squadron. The second voyage began with a deployment to Chilean waters to protect German interests during the War of the Pacific, after which she returned to Chinese waters. After returning to Germany in 1881, she was converted into a training ship and returned to service in that capacity in 1883. She went on only one major training cruise, which lasted from mid-1883 to late 1884; she toured ports in the Americas and helped to protect civilians during a period of civil unrest in Haiti in late 1883. She was thereafter decommissioned and remained out of service for the rest of her existence, seeing no further use. She was stricken from the naval register in 1896 and sold to ship breakers the following year.

== Design ==
The three Ariadne-class corvettes were ordered as part of the fleet plan of 1867, an expansion program aimed at strengthening the Prussian Navy in the wake of the Austro-Prussian War. The plan called for a total of twenty screw corvettes. The design for Freya was prepared in 1871 as a lengthened version of her half-sisters; the increased size of the ship was used to improve coal storage (and thus her cruising range) and strengthen her armament.

Freya was 85.35 meters (280 ft 0 in) long overall, with a beam of 10.8 m (35 ft 5 in) and a draft of 4.6 m (15 ft 1 in) forward. She displaced 2,406 metric tons (2,368 long tons) at full load. The ship's crew consisted of 12 officers and 220 enlisted men. She was powered by a single marine steam engine that drove one 4-bladed screw propeller, with steam provided by four coal-fired fire-tube boilers, which gave her a top speed of 15.2 knots (28.2 km/h; 17.5 mph) at 2,801 metric horsepower (2,763 ihp). She had a cruising radius of 2,500 nautical miles (4,600 km; 2,900 mi) at a speed of 10 knots (19 km/h; 12 mph). As built, Freya was equipped with a full ship rig, but this was later reduced to a barque rig.

Freya was armed with a battery of eight 15 cm (5.9 in) 22-caliber (cal.) breech-loading guns, one of which was later removed. She temporarily also carried four 17 cm (6.7 in) 25-cal. guns. In 1886, she had six 37 mm (1.5 in) Hotchkiss revolver cannon installed.

== Service history ==
The keel for Freya was laid down in January 1872 at the Kaiserliche Werft (Imperial Shipyard) in Danzig. She was launched on 29 December 1874 and she was transferred to Kiel on 21 August 1876, mostly complete. There, she received her final fitting-out, before being commissioned into the fleet on 1 October 1876. She thereafter began sea trials, which lasted until 15 November, when she was decommissioned in Kiel. Freya was assigned to I Reserve of the North Sea Naval Station and based in Wilhelmshaven on 15 January 1877, and she was moved to the base over the course of 19 July – 4 August. The voyage was delayed significantly because she was driven ashore by bad weather and had to be pulled free by a merchant vessel.

=== First overseas deployment ===
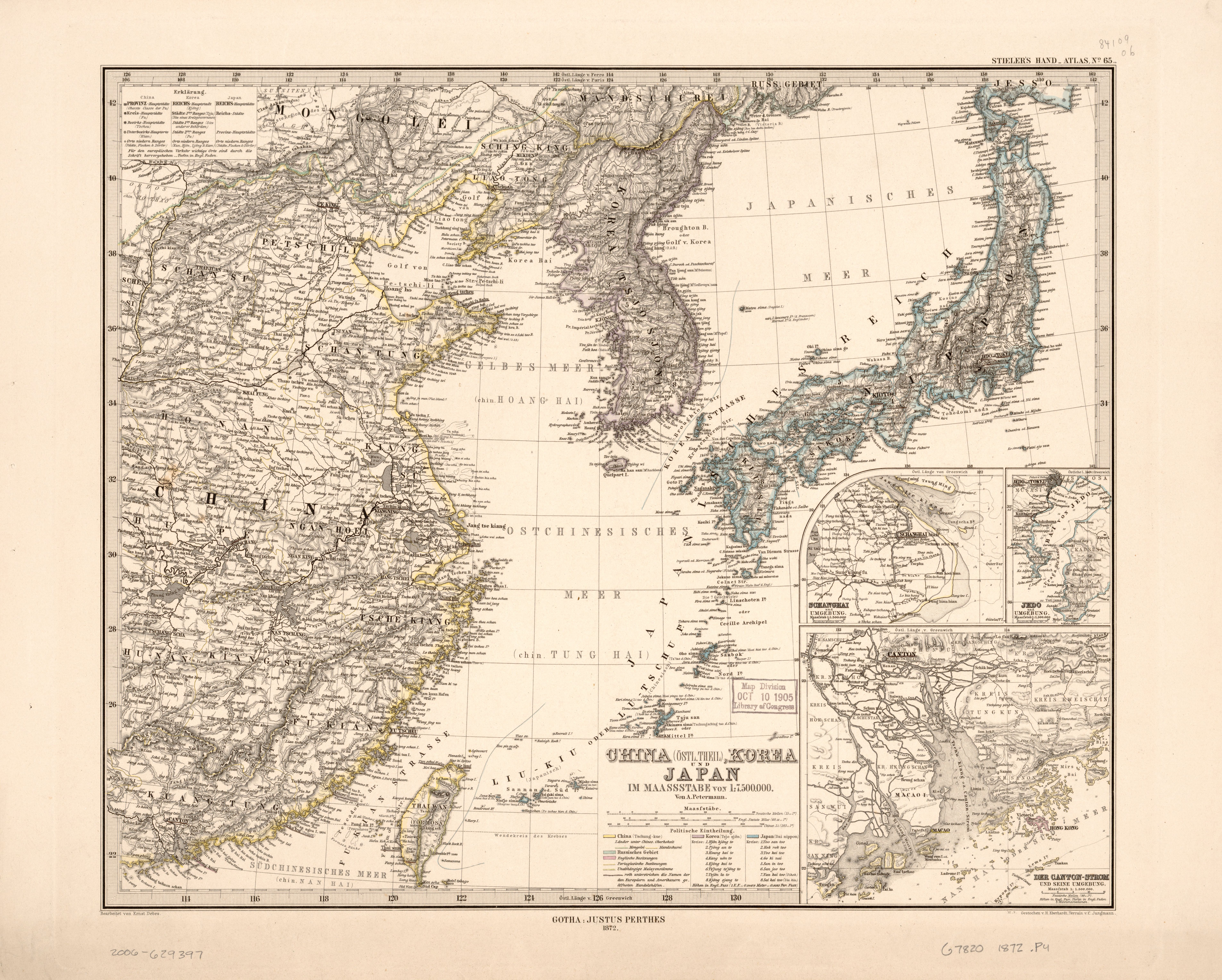
German 1872 map of China, Japan, and Korea

On 1 November 1877, Freya was commissioned for an overseas cruise to the Mediterranean Sea, which she began on 15 November. Severe storms in the English Channel forced the ship to take shelter in Falmouth, and she arrived in Smyrna in the Ottoman Empire on 12 December. There, she came under command of the German squadron in the Mediterranean, along with the frigate Hertha. Freya visited Piraeus, Greece on 7 February 1878, where she was later joined by Hertha. The two ships remained there until mid-March, when they returned to Smyrna. In July, the squadron was disbanded and Freya initially remained in the Aegean Sea. On 12 August, she received the order to proceed to East Asia, where she was to replace her sister Luise as a station ship in Chinese waters. Freya reached Hong Kong on 6 October where she rendezvoused with the corvette Leipzig, which was the flagship of the East Asia Squadron.

After arriving in Hong Kong, Freya went into the dry dock for repairs and periodic maintenance after her long voyage from Europe. This work lasted until 9 December, and two days later the ship moved to Shantou and then to Amoy to observe an episode of domestic unrest, and to be prepared to intervene if the situation devolved into attacks against Germans in Fujian province. She remained in Amoy from 17 December to 7 January 1879, though the riots did not threaten Germans in the city, and Freya was able to embark on a tour of ports in Formosa and the city of Fuzhou in Fujian. She went to Shanghai on 4 February, where she remained until 4 April. While there, she received the order to return to Germany, so she sailed to Hong Kong to await her replacement, Luise, and to prepare for the voyage back home. Freya remained there from 9 April to 3 May, when Luise arrived, allowing her to depart the station.

While on the way back, she had a serious accident where one of her boilers overheated and burst, throwing boiling water into one of the crew spaces, badly burning several sailors and killing four, who were buried in Batavia in the Dutch East Indies. She stopped in Cape Town, South Africa, where the British forces were waging the Anglo-Zulu War, where the colonial governor gave captured Zulu trophies to the ship as gifts to the German crown princess, Victoria, who was the daughter of British Queen Victoria. After much of the crew began to suffer from scurvy, Freya was forced to stop in Faial Island in the Azores to pick up fresh food to alleviate the condition. The ship arrived in Wilhelmshaven on 17 September, and she was decommissioned there ten days later.

=== Second overseas deployment ===
Freya was still in good condition, and so a lengthy overhaul was not necessary, allowing the ship to begin another cruise abroad immediately. She was recommissioned on 3 October; she was ordered to return to East Asia by way of the western coast of South America, where she was to assist the ironclad Hansa in protecting German interests during the War of the Pacific between Chile, Peru, and Bolivia. Freya left Germany on 26 October, and she met the frigate Vineta several times on the trip to South America. While in the Strait of Magellan, Freya encountered the stranded British steamer SS Maranhence and she towed her to Punta Arenas. On 3 March 1880, Freya arrived in Valparaíso, Chile, where she rendezvoused with Hansa. From 8 March to 14 April, Freya went to the Chilean port of Arica, which was under a Peruvian blockade.

The pressing need for warships in Chinese waters forced Freya to end her operations off South America on 14 April, and she steamed north to Panama to take on provisions for the lengthy voyage across the Pacific Ocean. She left Panama on 8 May and sailed to Honolulu (in what was then the Sandwich Islands), where she was visited by King Kalākaua. From there, Freya proceeded to Spanish Guam, where she took on additional fresh food from 4 to 5 August. She arrived in Hong Kong on 21 August, where she joined the East Asia Squadron, which also included Vineta and the gunboats Cyclop and Wolf. Freya steamed to Yantai on 9 September to rest her crew after their long voyage across the Pacific. She remained there until 28 October, and during that period she was joined by other members of the squadron. She then left for Shanghai, where she began a six-week period of maintenance on 1 November.

On 22 December, she returned to Hong Kong, and on 15 February 1881, the ship's new commander, Kapitän zur See (KzS—Captain at Sea) Kupfer, arrived. During the stay in Hong Kong, Freya conducted shooting drills in Mirs Bay, and from 30 March to 11 April, she made two trips to the Paracel Islands to conduct hydrographic surveys of the area. On 30 April, the German consul in China requested that Freya go to the Ninepin Group, where Chinese pirates had attacked the German barque Occident. She was unable to locate the pirates, however, and so returned to Hong Kong. On 24 May, Vineta left the squadron, making Kupfer the squadron commander, but on 18 June, he died of typhoid fever; the first officer, Korvettenkapitän (KK—Corvette Captain) Lepel-Gnitz, took command of the vessel. Freya began the voyage back to Germany on 30 June, and while in Batavia in mid-July, she met her replacement, the corvette Stosch, where Lepel-Gnitz turned over command of the squadron. Freya then proceeded across the Indian Ocean, through the Suez Canal and the Mediterranean, arriving in Wilhelmshaven on 6 October, where she was decommissioned on 21 October.

=== Later career ===
Having already had success using Luise and Ariadne as training ships for Schiffsjungen (apprentice seamen), the Kaiserliche Admiralität (Imperial Admiralty) decided to convert Freya into a training vessel as well. The work lasted from late 1881 to early 1883, and she was recommissioned for training duties on 3 March 1883. She went to Kiel on 7 May, and then proceeded into the North Sea for trials. She then embarked a contingent of trainees and began a short training cruise to Danzig and Karlskrona, Sweden on 12 July, which ended in Kiel. On 25 July, a longer-distance cruise to South America and the Caribbean Sea began. During the voyage, she stopped in Bahía Blanca, Argentina on 24 September. She went to Port-au-Prince, Haiti, in response to domestic unrest there. She arrived on 29 October and remained until 16 November, when she left to go to Jacmel, where she picked up 250 civilians and carried them to Kingston, Jamaica. Freya returned to Port-au-Prince on 16 December, and since the government had by then suppressed the rebels, Freya was able to continue her cruise in January 1884. She visited Puerto Cabello, Venezuela, Bermuda, and Hampton Roads, United States.

On arriving back in German waters, she joined the annual fleet maneuvers on 1 September, which were conducted in the North and Baltic Seas. After the maneuvers ended, Freya returned to Kiel on 21 September and continued on to Danzig six days later, where she disembarked the trainees. The ship was decommissioned for an overhaul on 11 October, which lasted until late 1887. During this period, her rigging was reduced to that of a barque. The ship was recommissioned on 23 October 1887 for trials, after which she went to Kiel and then Wilhelmshaven, where she arrived on 22 December. On 17 January 1888 she was decommissioned there; she did not see further active use, which was unusual given that she had just been overhauled. The naval historians Hans Hildebrand, Albert Röhr, and Hans-Otto Steinmetz speculated that because the corvette Nixe, which had been built specifically as a training ship, had entered service by that time, the Admiralität decided that Freya was redundant. In late 1893, Freya was transferred to the list of harbor ships, and she was stricken from the naval register altogether on 14 December 1896. She was thereafter broken up in Kiel.
