= Showing the flag =

Deploying warships to demonstrate power

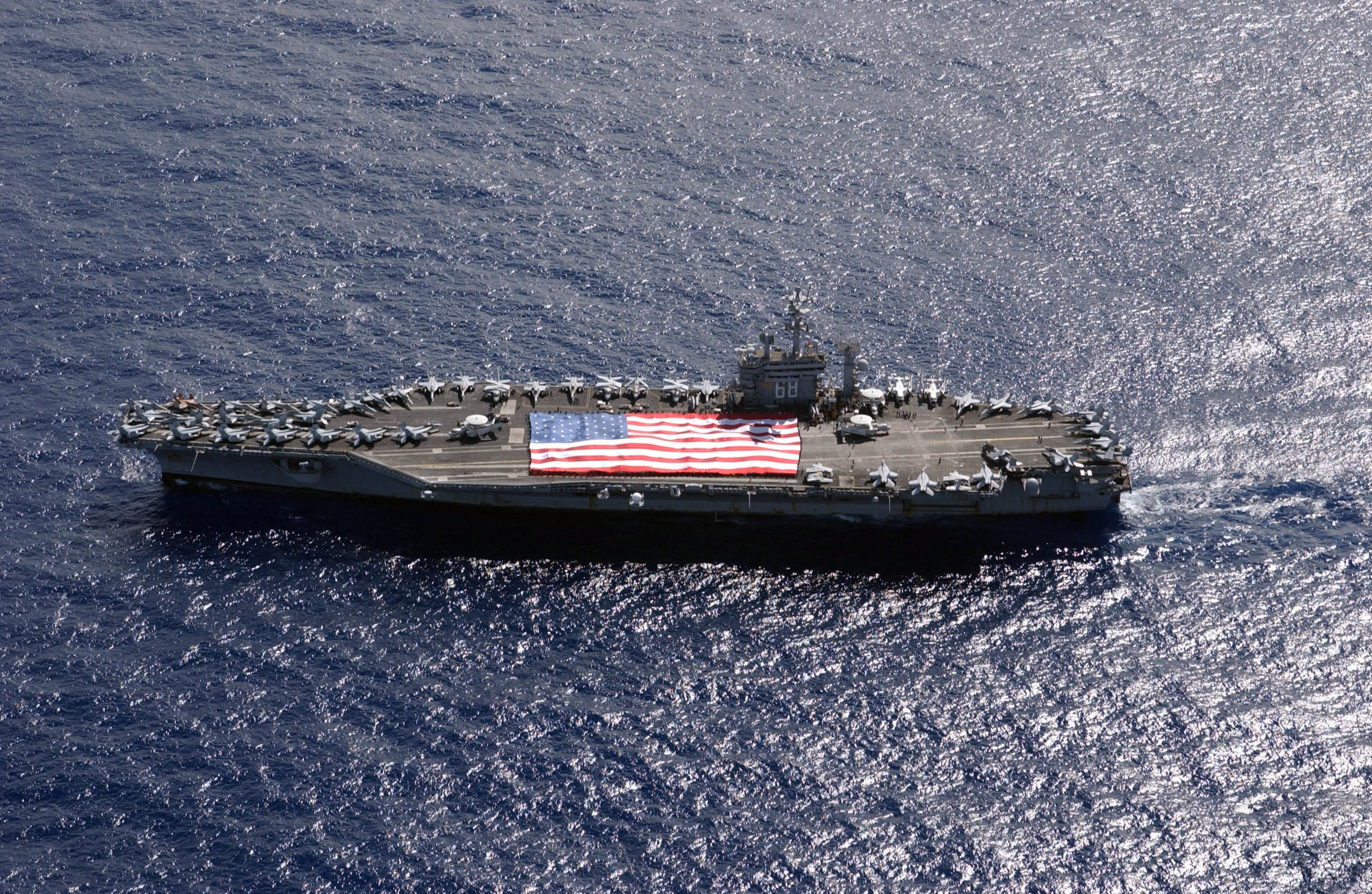
Pacific Ocean, 3 November 2003. Crew members of the aircraft carrier USS Nimitz participate in a flag-unfurling rehearsal during a Tiger Cruise.

Showing the flag is the practice of deploying warships on distant cruises to neutral or foreign waters in order to demonstrate military power, national prestige, power projection, and influence on international politics.

Unlike direct aggression, showing the flag functions as an instrument of gunboat diplomacy and soft power, aimed at supporting allies or deterring potential adversaries without engaging in open armed conflict.

== Objectives ==
The primary objectives of such missions include:

- Political pressure — reaffirming claims to influence in a particular region.
- Deterrence of aggressive behavior by potential adversaries.
- Denial of control over specific maritime areas to potential opponents.
- Diplomatic support — shaping a favorable background for interstate negotiations.
- Demonstration of technological superiority — showcasing advanced weapon systems and high crew proficiency.
- Security provision — protecting national interests, citizens, and shipping in unstable regions.

The success of naval port visits depends on selecting objectives consistent with bilateral relations, on frank preliminary consultations between naval officers and diplomats, on understanding the political and cultural characteristics of the host country, and on thorough advance planning. Poor planning may produce effects opposite to those intended.

== History ==
The practice of showing the flag emerged during the Age of Sail, when the arrival of a powerful ship of the line in a foreign port served as an unmistakable reminder of a state's naval strength.

Admiral Horatio Nelson is often quoted as remarking that he “hated your pen-and-ink diplomats,” asserting that fleets of British warships were the best negotiators in Europe.

=== Notable examples of showing the flag ===
==== Visit of Edward VII to Italy (1903) ====
One of the most frequently cited historical examples of showing the flag is the visit of King Edward VII of the United Kingdom to Italy in 1903. The king undertook a series of foreign visits intended to strengthen the international position of the British Empire following the tense late Victorian period. These journeys formed part of a broader policy of demonstrating the global reach of the Royal Navy, reinforcing ties with European powers, and affirming Britain’s status as the world’s leading naval power.

Italy, and Naples in particular, constituted an important stop. The Mediterranean was regarded as a strategic arena in which Britain simultaneously competed and cooperated with France, Germany, and Austria-Hungary. Although the visit was officially described as private and “incognito,” the king arrived in Naples escorted by a substantial Royal Navy squadron.

The king’s private secretary, Francis Knollys, later recalled the irony of the situation:

I had telegraphed Naples to say that the King would arrive incognito, which seemed rather absurd as no other human being in the world could come with eight battleships, four cruisers, four destroyers and a dispatch vessel.

==== The Great White Fleet (1907–1909) ====
One of the most extensive examples in history was the global cruise of the so-called Great White Fleet of the United States Navy. On the orders of President Theodore Roosevelt, sixteen battleships circumnavigated the globe to demonstrate to Japan and other powers the growing naval strength of the United States.

==== Soviet global naval exercises “Okean-70” ====
During the Cold War, the Soviet Union actively employed showing the flag to consolidate its status as a maritime superpower. Large-scale exercises and subsequent port visits by Soviet warships to Africa, Asia, and Latin America served as instruments for expanding influence in the developing world.

== Contemporary practice ==
In the 21st century, showing the flag frequently takes the form of multinational exercises or patrols in contested waters, such as U.S. Navy deployments to the South China Sea intended to affirm the principle of freedom of navigation.

Large-scale naval combat against major or medium powers occurs infrequently. Instead, showing the flag, deterrence, protection of sea lines of communication, and presence operations characterize the actual employment strategy of forward-deployed naval forces.

== Legal aspects ==
From the perspective of international maritime law, showing the flag relies on the principle of freedom of the high seas and the right of innocent passage through territorial waters. However, the deployment of large naval formations into areas of interest of other states frequently provokes diplomatic protests and may be perceived as a provocation.

The necessity of “demonstrating the flag of the Russian Federation in the World Ocean” is formally stated in the Foundations of State Policy of the Russian Federation in the Field of Naval Activities through 2030.

== See also ==
- Gunboat diplomacy
