= SMS Leipzig (1875) =

Screw corvette of the German Imperial Navy

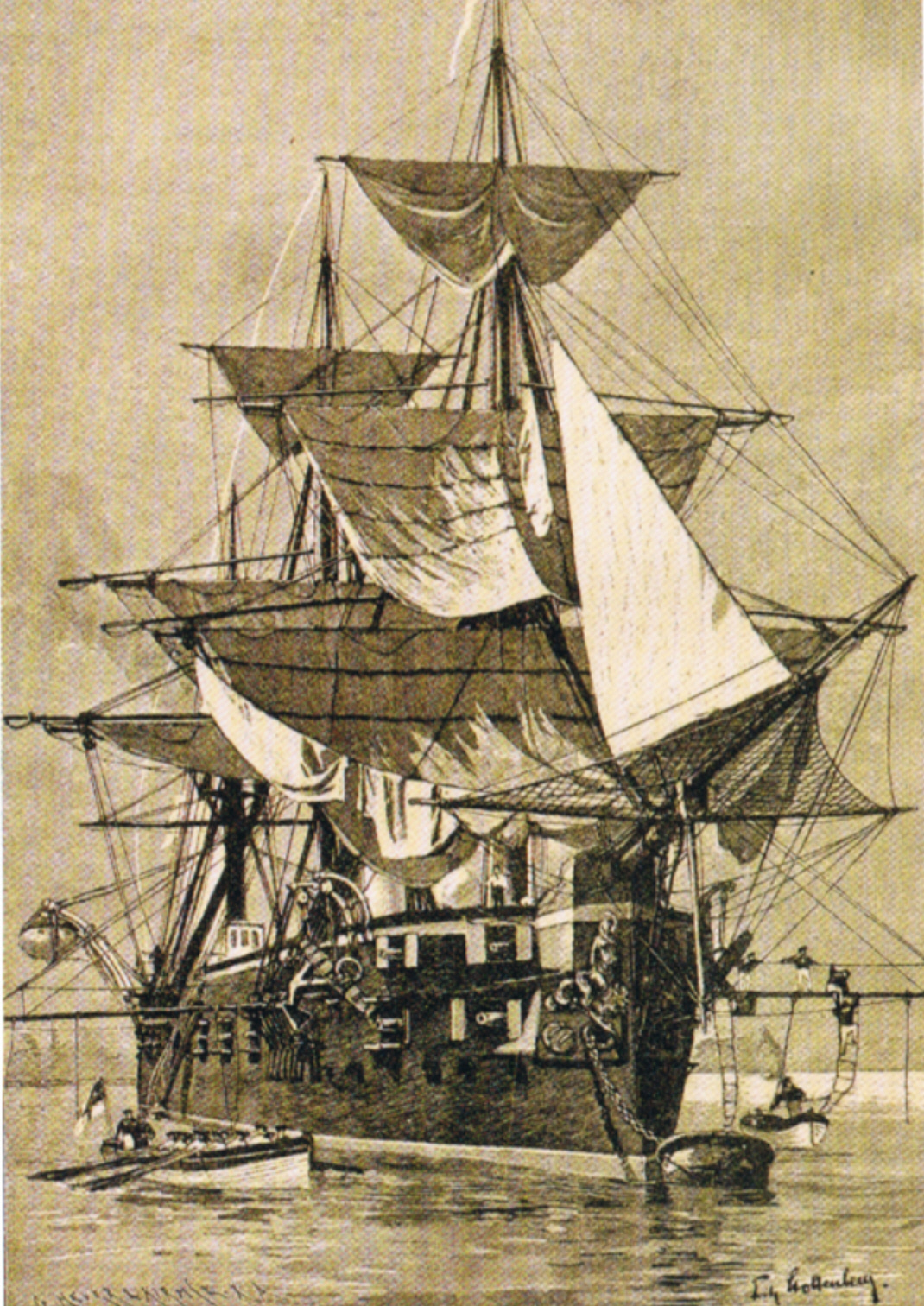
- Illustration of Leipzig by Fritz Stoltenberg

History

German Empire
- Name: Leipzig
- Namesake: Battle of Leipzig
- Builder: AG Vulcan, Stettin
- Laid down: 1 April 1874
- Launched: 13 September 1875
- Commissioned: 1 June 1877
- Decommissioned: 2 June 1893
- Stricken: 27 August 1894
- Fate: Broken up, 1921

General characteristics
- Class & type: Leipzig-class corvette
- Displacement: Full load: 4,626 metric tons (4,553 long tons)
- Length: 87.5 m (287 ft 1 in) (loa)
- Beam: 14 m (45 ft 11 in)
- Draft: 6.2 m (20 ft 4 in)
- Installed power: 6 × fire tube boilers; 6,050 metric horsepower (5,970 ihp)
- Propulsion: 1 × marine steam engine; 1 × screw propeller
- Sail plan: Full ship rig
- Speed: 15.8 knots (29.3 km/h; 18.2 mph)
- Range: 2,330 nautical miles (4,320 km; 2,680 mi) at 10 kn (19 km/h; 12 mph)
- Crew: 39 officers; 386 sailors
- Armament: 2 × 17 cm (6.7 in) RK L/25 guns; 10 × 17 cm RK L/20 guns

SMS Leipzig was a German flush-deck steam corvette, the lead ship of the Leipzig class, named after the 1813 Battle of Leipzig. She was built for the Kaiserliche Marine (Imperial Navy) in the 1870s, being laid down in early 1875, launched in September that year, and commissioned into the fleet in May 1877. She had one sister ship, SMS Prinz Adalbert. Intended for long cruises abroad, the ship was fitted with a full ship rig to supplement her steam engine if coal was unavailable. She carried a battery of twelve 17 cm (6.7 in) guns.

Leipzig went on two overseas cruises as a training ship for naval cadets early in her career. The first, in 1877–1878, went to Central America and East Asia; while in Central American waters, she was involved in an international dispute between Germany and Nicaragua. The second cruise, which took place from 1882 to 1884, also went to East Asia. While on the way back to Germany, she stopped in the newly-proclaimed colony of German Southwest Africa, where she participated in the flag-raising ceremony. From 1885 to 1888, Leipzig was extensively modernized and reconstructed for use as a squadron flagship overseas.

In 1888, Leipzig embarked on a major overseas deployment, first to German East Africa, which was in the midst of the Abushiri revolt. Leipzig and several other warships formed a cruiser squadron that bombarded rebel troops and sent landing parties ashore to suppress the rebellion, which was defeated by 1890. Leipzig and the rest of the squadron went to East Asia, but in 1891 they were reassigned to Chilean waters to protect German interests during the Civil War of 1891. After the fighting subsided, Leipzig alternated between East Africa and East Asia before being recalled to Germany in 1893 after a refit in Cape Town revealed a significant deterioration in her condition. Found to be not worth repairing, she was converted into a barracks ship and training hulk, a role she filled until 1919, when she sank unexpectedly. She was raised in 1921 and subsequently broken up that year.

== Design ==
After the Franco-Prussian War of 1870–1871, the newly formed Kaiserliche Marine (Imperial Navy) began an expansion program to strengthen the fleet. The naval command determined that modern steam corvettes were necessary for scouting purposes, as well as overseas cruising duties to protect German interests abroad. The two Leipzig-class corvettes were ordered as part of the fleet plan of 1873, which called for a total of twenty unarmored corvettes, twelve of which were already either in service or under construction. Leipzig was the first iron-hulled corvette of the German fleet; originally designed with a forecastle, the ship was completed with a flush deck instead.

Leipzig was 87.5 meters (287 ft 1 in) long overall, with a beam of 14 m (45 ft 11 in) and a draft of 6.2 m (20 ft 4 in) forward. She displaced 4,626 metric tons (4,553 long tons) at full load. The ship's crew consisted of 39 officers and 386 enlisted men. She was powered by a single marine steam engine that drove one 2-bladed screw propeller, with steam provided by six coal-fired fire-tube boilers, which gave her a top speed of 15.8 knots (29.3 km/h; 18.2 mph) at 6,050 metric horsepower (5,970 ihp). She had a cruising radius of 2,330 nautical miles (4,320 km; 2,680 mi) at a speed of 10 knots (19 km/h; 12 mph). Leipzig was equipped with a full ship rig to supplement her steam engines on long-distance cruises.

Leipzig was armed with a battery of twelve 17 cm (6.7 in) breech-loading guns, two of which were 25-caliber (cal.); the other ten were shorter 20-cal. weapons. The two longer guns were on the upper deck as chase guns, one forward and one aft, and the rest were placed on the broadside. The ship also carried a pair of 8.8 cm (3.5 in) landing guns that could be taken ashore with a landing party.

=== Modifications ===
In the early 1880s, she had four 37 mm (1.5 in) Hotchkiss revolver cannon installed, along with four 35 cm (13.8 in) torpedo tubes. These were all above-water launchers, with two in the bow and one on each side. By this time, another pair of 8.8 cm landing guns had been added to the ship's equipment.

A more substantial reconstruction was effected in 1885 and 1886. This included replacing her original boilers with ten coal-burning Scotch marine boilers, which were divided into two boiler rooms. These were vented through a pair of fixed funnels. The copper sheathing of her hull was replaced, and additional watertight bulkheads were installed. The number of 3.7 cm guns was increased to six.

== Service history ==
Leipzig was laid down at the AG Vulcan shipyard in Stettin on 1 April 1874. Her completed hull was launched on 13 September 1875, and her launching ceremony was attended by the Chief of the Kaiserliche Admiralität (Imperial Admiralty), General Albrecht von Stosch, who christened the ship Leipzig after the 1813 Battle of Leipzig. After fitting-out work was completed, she was towed from Stettin to Swinemünde on 31 May 1877 and was commissioned into the fleet the following day, though she had not yet had her armament installed. The Oberburgermeister of Leipzig, Otto Robert Georgi, and Field Marshal Prince Friedrich Karl of Prussia attended the commissioning ceremony; Georgi gave the ship its flags as a gift from the city of Leipzig. Leipzig then began initial sea trials that lasted until 12 June. The ship then had her guns installed and rigging fitted, which took some three months.

Leipzig began further trials starting on 13 September under the command of Korvettenkapitän (KK—Corvette Captain) Carl Paschen. A week later, she accidentally ran aground off Kleverberg outside Kiel and had to have some 400 t (390 long tons; 440 short tons) of ballast removed before she could be refloated. The ship's hull was not seriously damaged in the accident, however, and she was then towed to the Kaiserliche Werft (Imperial Shipyard) in Kiel by the shipyard tugboat Notus. Sea trials were completed on 5 October, and the following day, Leipzig was ordered to begin preparations for her first overseas cruise. The ship was dry-docked on 23 October for repairs following the grounding. Another mishap occurred after this work was completed, when she broke her bowsprit while being moved in the port; this delayed her departure until 17 November.

=== First overseas cruise ===
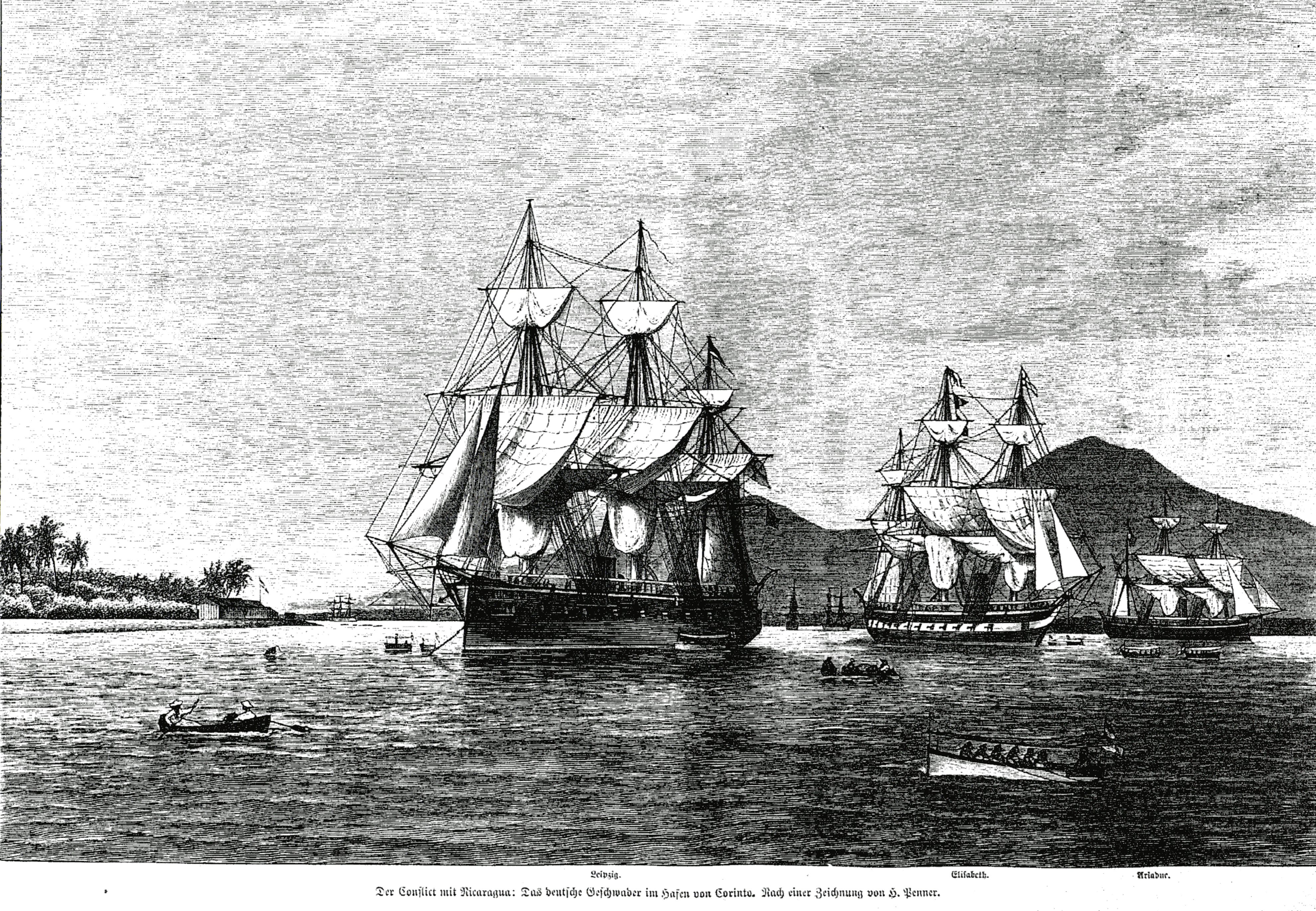
Leipzig with the frigate Elisabeth and the corvette Ariadne off Nicaragua in March 1878

Still under Paschen's command, Leipzig was to be employed as a training ship for naval cadets. She embarked men from the Crew of 1876, which included the future admirals Erich Gühler, Wilhelm Schack, and Adolph von Bassewitz. Paschen's orders instructed him to proceed to East Asia, where he would serve as the commander of German warships in the region. On 17 November, Leipzig departed Germany and crossed the Atlantic Ocean, passing around South America. She arrived in Valparaíso, Chile, on 4 February 1878, where she med the corvette Ariadne. The two ships proceeded north, though Leipzig had to stop at Callao, Peru, to replenish her fuel bunkers as the ship had proved to have a voracious appetite for coal. Continuing north, the two corvettes were joined by the screw frigate Elisabeth, and the three vessels temporarily formed a squadron that was ordered to protect German interests in Nicaragua during the so-called "Eisenstuck Affair". A pair of German merchants, Paul and Christian Eisenstuck, were reportedly attacked in the country and the Nicaraguan government did not investigate the incident quickly enough for German satisfaction, and so Bernhard Ernst von Bülow, the foreign minister, ordered a flotilla of warships to enforce German demands for an indemnity. In early 1878, Leipzig and five other vessels that had gathered off the coast landed men at Corinto to seize weapons in the event that Nicaragua chose to resist German demands, though the government quickly acceded.

On 11 April, Leipzig resumed her voyage to East Asia. She stopped in Honolulu in the Hawaiian Islands on 25 May, where she was visited by King Kalākaua. She then visited several ports in Mexico and the United States, before proceeding across the Pacific. She arrived in Yokohama, Japan on 5 July, where she relieved the corvette SMS Augusta, which then departed for Germany. At the time, the East Asia Squadron also included the gunboats Albatross and Cyclop, though Albatross was soon replaced by Wolf, and the corvette Freya joined them later. On 7 October, Paschen was promoted to the rank of Kapitän zur See (KzS—Captain at Sea); at that time, all four ships of the squadron rendezvoused in Nagasaki, Japan. Over the following five months, Leipzig remained in Japanese waters. In April 1879, she sailed to Hong Kong, China, where she met her sister ship Prinz Adalbert and the corvette Luise, which had been sent to replace Leipzig and Freya, respectively. The captain of Prinz Adalbert formally took command of the station on 13 May in Hong Kong. On 28 May, Leipzig departed Shanghai and began the voyage back to Germany, stopping in Singapore, Anjer in the Dutch East Indies, Mauritius, Cape Town, South Africa, and Plymouth, Great Britain, before arriving in Kiel on 27 September. There, she was decommissioned.

=== Second overseas cruise ===
Leipzig remained out of service until late 1882, and during this period she underwent an extensive overhaul that included moving the bridge further aft, replacing the rudder with a more effective one, and installing the four 35 cm torpedo tubes. On returning to service in October 1882 under the command of KK Otto Herbig, she embarked the 1881 Crew, which included Franz von Hipper. The ship departed Germany on 19 October, under strict orders from Stosch to limit consumption of coal to absolute necessity. After encountering severe storms in the North Sea, Leipzig stopped in Plymouth and Yarmouth to wait for the weather to improve. She thereafter followed the same route to East Asia as she had in 1877, though she did not stop in Central America while en route. She reached East Asia in June 1883, where she joined the corvette Stosch, the flagship of Konteradmiral (KAdm—Rear Admiral) Louis von Blanc. In August, Leipzig visited Vladivostok, Russia, and in October, she carried the German Consul General from Shanghai to Chemulpo, so he could sign a trade agreement between Germany and the Kingdom of Korea. Poor weather conditions compelled Leipzig to stay in Korea through December, and during this period Herbig, four officers, and the ship's band went to visit King Gojong of Korea in Seoul. On 15 December, Herbig was promoted to the rank of Kapitän zur See. Leipzig later visited Xiamen, China, which had been the site of a minor diplomatic incident.

In early March 1884, Leipzig received orders to begin the voyage back to Germany. The ship stopped first in Manila in the Philippines before sailing through the Sulu Sea to northern Borneo, where she stopped in Sandakan. While in Borneo, she grounded on Pegasus rock, though she was able to pull herself free. From there, she sailed to Singapore for repairs that lasted from 19 April to 10 June. During this stay, a major outbreak of fever rendered 6 officers and 230 sailors seriously ill, and they had to be transported home, with a replacement crew sent to bring Leipzig back to Germany. While in Cape Town, Herbig received new orders directing him to take Leipzig to German South West Africa, which had recently been declared a German protectorate. Leipzig sailed to Lüderitz Bay on 18 July, where she was joined by Elisabeth on 6 August. Elisabeth's captain read the formal proclamation announcing the German protectorate, and Leipzig remained in the area to patrol the new colony. On 30 August, she went to the island of Fernando Po, where she met the gunboat Möwe, which had the German Commissioner Gustav Nachtigal aboard. On 5 September, she sailed to Porto Seguro in Togoland. Leipzig then left West African waters and returned to Germany by way of Cape Verde, Madeira, and Plymouth. She reached Wilhelmshaven, Germany, on 9 October.

=== Refit ===
Leipzig in dry dock in 1885 during an extensive refit

The Admiralität issued orders on 18 February 1885 to heavily rebuild the ship, which on 25 November 1884 had been re-designated as a "Kreuzerfregatte" (Cruiser-Frigate). She was to be modified for service as a permanent cruiser squadron flagship, able to remain abroad for extended periods of time. At that time, the German navy did not possess a ship suited to that purpose, and opposition in the Reichstag (Imperial Diet) prevented the construction of a new vessel to fill the role. Leipzig was stripped down to her iron hull and almost completely rebuilt with new wood planking, the installation of additional transverse bulkheads to increase the number of watertight compartments, a new propulsion system, and a reorganization of the interior spaces to accommodate an admiral and his staff. The new boilers installed in the ship necessitated the addition of a second funnel, which was fixed, as opposed to the original funnel that could be retracted.

Work was finished by late 1886, and the ship was recommissioned under the command of KK Herbing for sea trials, which lasted from 1 September to 20 October. Speed tests demonstrated that the ship was not fast enough for her intended duties, and attempts to increase her speed by fitting a different rudder to reduce drag failed to rectify the problem. She therefore went back into the shipyard, and during this period, electrical generators were installed to provide electric lights for the entire ship. She was recommissioned again on 12 October 1887, again under Herbing's command, for additional trials that lasted until 12 November. Her speed still proved unsatisfactory, and during the tests she suffered an accident with her propeller. On 6 April 1888, she was again ready for trials, now under command of KK Eduard Hartog. She was still too slow, so she returned to the shipyard yet again, though she remained in commission during this last period, and in early June she was finally declared ready for service.

=== Third overseas cruise ===
==== 1888–1890 ====
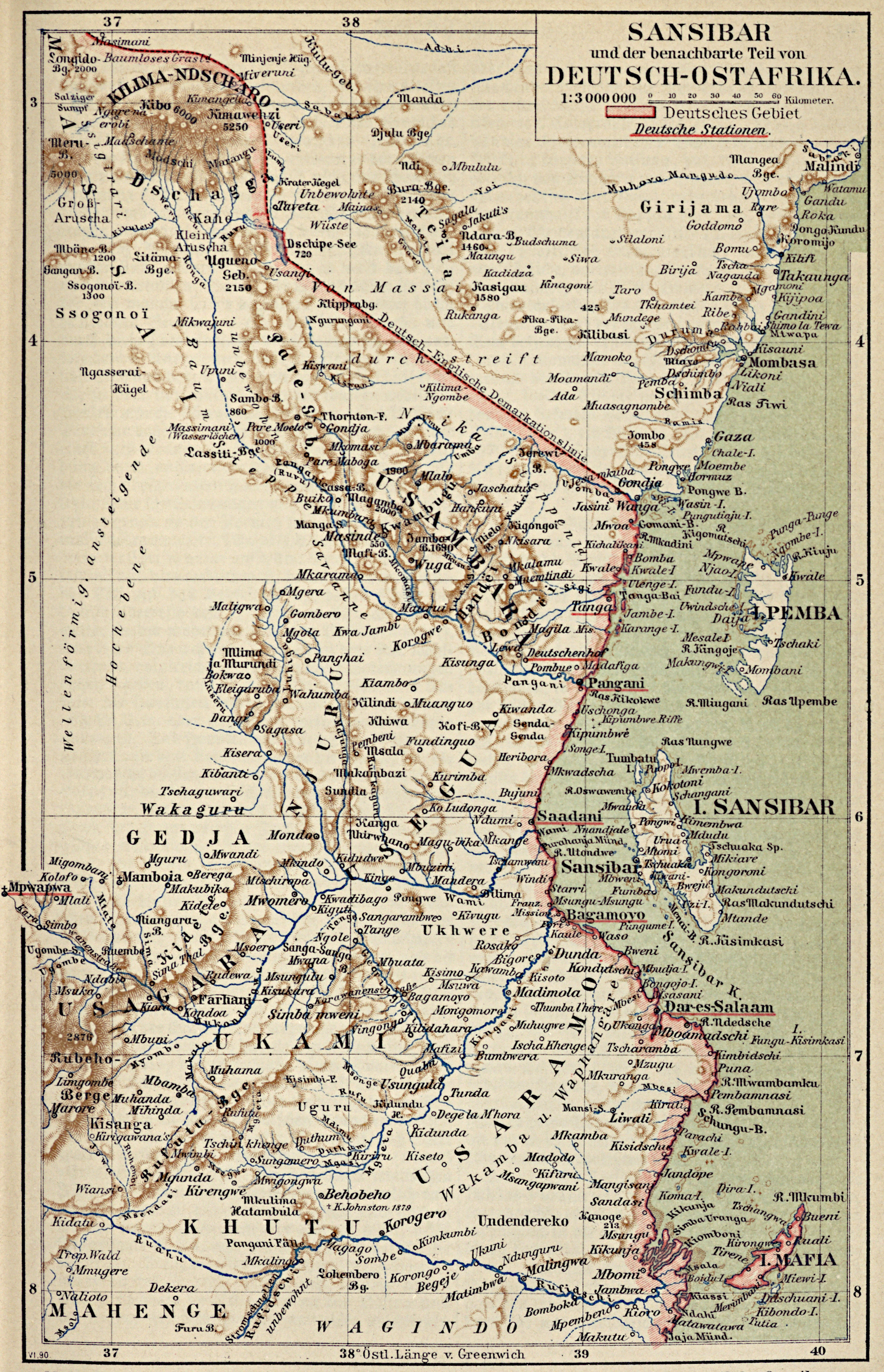
Map of German East Africa from c. 1890

Leipzig embarked on her next deployment abroad on 14 June to replace the corvette Bismarck. The new squadron commander, KAdm Karl August Deinhard, was travelling independently by passenger ship. Leipzig stopped in Aden on 16 July, where she formally relieved Bismarck as the squadron flagship, and proceeded to Zanzibar, where she arrived on 2 August. There, she joined the corvette Olga; the latter vessel's commander, KzS Franz Strauch was serving as the squadron's interim commander while Deinhard was still en route, and so he transferred to Leipzig and Hartog took his place aboard Olga. Deinhard arrived on 31 August and took command of the squadron in Manda Bay, Kenya. At the time, the squadron consisted of Leipzig, Olga, Möwe, and from 31 December the unprotected cruiser Schwalbe and from 5 January 1889 the aviso Pfeil. The squadron, which was intended to operate in the South Pacific, had instead to remain off German East Africa due to the Abushiri revolt, a major rebellion against German rule; this was indeed the reason Schwalbe and Pfeil were sent to reinforce the squadron. The operations conducted off German East Africa were the largest and longest sustained action of the German fleet before World War I.

On 8 September, Leipzig, Olga, and Möwe sent troops ashore at Tanga. Leipzig then went to Bagamoyo where she shelled rebel troops. Starting on 2 November, the German ships enforced a blockade of the coast in concert with the Royal Navy, and a month later the Italian and Portuguese warships in the region joined the effort. From 5 to 6 December, Leipzig again bombarded rebel forces in Bagamoyo; she remained there for the rest of the month and was joined there for subsequent battles by the corvette Carola. Leipzig then went to Dar es Salam, which she helped to defend from 11 to 16 January 1889. On 3 February, she went to Bagamoyo to defend the port from renewed rebel attacks. Leipzig's marines took part in the occupation of Kunduchi on 27 March 1889, in a campaign led by Major Hermann Wissmann. On 8 May, men from Leipzig, Carola, and Schwalbe attacked a rebel camp outside of Bagamoyo, and two days later Leipzig's detachment attacked Mbegani and Mwangoni. Leipzig, Pfeil, and Schwalbe shelled Saadani on 6 June and sent men ashore to attack rebels there. In July, Leipzig operated off Pangani and Tanga and participated in the blockade effort.

By the end of July, the insurrection was all but over; Dar es Salam and Bagamoyo had been successfully defended and Wissmann's troops had retaken Tanga and Saadani. In August, Schwalbe was detached to rest her crew in Mauritius and Möwe was sent home. On 13 August, Leipzig left East Africa to undergo an overhaul in Cape Town. The work lasted into September, and while Leipzig was away, her place as squadron flagship was taken by Carola. On 4 September, while Leipzig was still in the drydock, Deinhard received instructions that he was to take his ship as soon as was possible to the Mediterranean Sea, where he was to brief Kaiser Wilhelm II, who was cruising there in his yacht Hohenzollern with the Armored Training Squadron. By early October, work on Leipzig had proceeded to the point where the ship was again seaworthy and she was able to steam north to the eastern Mediterranean, which she reached on 28 October. She rendezvoused with the Armored Training Squadron off the island of Mytilene on 1 November; Hohenzollern was at that time in Constantinople in the Ottoman Empire, and she arrived five days later. Deinhard delivered his report on 6 November, after which all of the German ships steamed to Italy and Leipzig went into the drydock in Venice on 12 November to complete the overhaul begun in Cape Town.

==== 1890–1891 ====
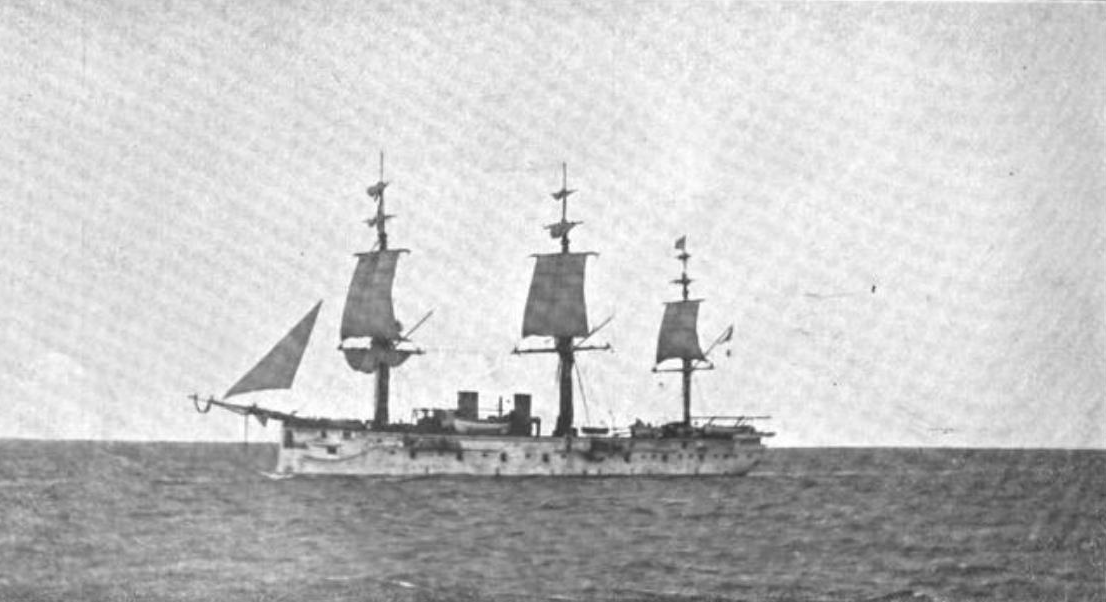
Leipzig underway

The overhaul was finished on 15 December, allowing Leipzig to return to East Africa, stopping in Malta and Port Said on the way; while in the latter port, the ship's crew celebrated Christmas and New Year's Day, 1890. The ship then proceeded to Aden, where she received orders to proceed to East Asia, rather than East Africa. The rest of the squadron was to remain in East African waters, while Leipzig proceeded independently to China. While on the way across the Indian Ocean, she stopped in Kochi, India, before reaching Hong Kong on 20 March. There, she joined the other warships on the East Asia station, the corvette Sophie and the gunboats Iltis and Wolf. By this time, Deinhard had been promoted to the rank of Vizeadmiral (VAdm—Vice Admiral) and recalled to Germany; his replacement, KAdm Victor Valois, began the voyage out to take command of the squadron. Leipzig began a tour of Japanese ports, and while in Nagasaki on 20 May, Valois reached the ship. Leipzig then cruised south to Singapore via Hong Kong and Manila, after which she toured the Dutch East Indies, sailed through Dampier Strait, and then visited the Bismarck Archipelago. The voyage ended in Sydney, Australia on 16 September, where she met the corvette Alexandrine, which then joined the squadron.

Leipzig went into drydock in Sydney for repairs, and in November the squadron sailed to New Zealand and then to Apia in Samoawhich had recently become part of the German colonial empire. In January 1891, the ships of the East Asia Squadron left Apia and returned to Hong Kong, at times sailing independently. Leipzig arrived there on 14 February and beginning in mid-March, she began a tour of Chinese ports, which included Nanking. While in the Wusung Roads she ran aground, but was able to free herself at high tide. Valois received instructions ordering him to take his corvettes to Chile, but the grounding delayed his departure. He had taken Leipzig to Yokohama to have the ship's hull inspected for damage, and while there he received another set of orders stressing the need to proceed to South America as soon as possible. Chile was embroiled in the Civil War of 1891, and the conflict threatened German interests in the country. The German chancellor, Leo von Caprivi, initially opposed sending warships to join the international fleet that had begun to assemble off Chile to protect foreigners in the country, but after an extended debate in the Reichstag, he relented and ordered Valois to Chile. Caprivi's rationale, which originated with the Kaiser, was to try to secure more funding for the navy by arguing that it lacked sufficient ships to meet current needs. The second order Valois had received was worded so harshly that he instructed his ship's captains to skip replenishing their coal stocks to avoid any further delay, hoping instead to use favorable winds to cross the Pacific as quickly as possible.

As the ships crossed the Pacific, they did not find the winds to be strong enough to propel them as quickly as Valois had hoped, and so they had to resort to their steam engines. But Leipzig, which notoriously burned through coal at a prodigious rate, ran out of fuel while en route. Sophie and Alexandrine had to take her under tow for the rest of the voyage, which covered some 1,217 nautical miles (2,254 km; 1,400 mi) over the course of 97 hours. The ships initially went to San Francisco, United States before proceeding south to Valparaíso; they arrived on 6 July, but remained outside of the harbor for three days. At the time, fighting had not yet spread to the city, and so from late July to late August, he took his ships further north to Iquique and Coquimbo. Valois returned to Valparaíso on 20 August, and by that time, rebel forces had advanced on the city. He negotiated with Captain Jorge Montt, a Chilean Navy officer that supported the rebel Congressist faction, to allow a German landing party of 9 officers and 291 sailors to go ashore to protect Germans in the city. This effort was done in cooperation with a party from the British corvette HMS Champion. While the men were ashore, they set up a hospital under the supervision of Leipzig's doctor. On 30 August, the rebel forces under Colonel Estanislao del Canto had taken control of the city. With the fighting in the city over, the landing party returned to their ships on 13 September. Shortly thereafter, the Chilean president, José Manuel Balmaceda, killed himself, which effectively ended the conflict. Valois's ships remained in Chile for another three months but there were no further incidents in the country.

==== 1891–1893 ====
In mid-December, Valois received orders from Berlin to leave the region. The ships passed through the Strait of Magellan on 1 January 1892 and arrived in Montevideo five days later. Valois expected to be instructed to return home at this point, but he was instead ordered to cross the Atlantic to Cape Town. While en route, they stopped in Rio Grande do Sul, Brazil. The ships reached Cape Town on 21 February; two days later, KAdm Friedrich von Pawelsz arrived to relieve Valois as the squadron commander. The ships underwent repairs in Cape Town before sailing north to Delagoa Bay on 22 March, where Pawelsz traveled overland to the South African Republic to pay a visit to the president, Paul Kruger. The ships then continued on to German East Africa, where they joined Schwalbe and Möwe. The situation there was calm, so the squadron continued on to East Asia, leaving behind Sophie, as she was scheduled to return to Germany in June. Her place was taken by the corvette Arcona. Leipzig and Alexandrine continued on to Colombo, where they embarked replacement crews for Iltis and Wolf. The two corvettes then steamed to Hong Kong. They thereafter toured Chinese ports in September and October, during which time Alexandrine left for Japan. While Leipzig was in Shanghai, Pawelsz received orders to return to East Africa, as the succession of Ali bin Said of Zanzibar threatened to destabilize the region. Pawelsz recalled Alexandrine and the two ships rendezvoused in Hong Kong; they departed on 16 November to return to East Africa.

The ships reached Zanzibar on 5 January 1893; a month later, on 6 February, Arcona joined them. The corvette Marie, which had been stationed in Central American waters, was also assigned to Pawelsz's squadron. Schwalbe and Möwe were also still in East Africa, bringing the total number of vessels available to respond to any crises resulting from bin Said's accession to the throne to six. The transition proved to be uneventful, and so on 3 March Leipzig went to Cape Town for an overhaul; she was joined there by Arcona and Alexandrine later in the month. It was planned that the squadron would return to East Asia once repairs were completed, but it was discovered that Leipzig had deteriorated significantly in her years abroad. Wear on her propulsion system proved to be too extensive for the shipyard in Cape Town, and so VAdm Friedrich von Hollmann, the State Secretary of the Reichsmarineamt (RMA—Imperial Navy Office), ordered her to return to Germany. On 29 March, Pawelsz received instructions to return home with Leipzig and to dissolve the squadron; the other ships were to proceed elsewhere independently. On 6 April, Leipzig left Cape Town and sailed north through the Atlantic, stopping in Saint Helena, Cape Verde, and Madeira on the way. She was greeted in the Schillig roadstead on 18 May by Admiral Max von der Goltz and her old commander, VAdm Valois, who was now the Chief of the Marinestation der Nordsee (North Sea Naval Station).

=== Fate ===
After arriving in Wilhelmshaven, Leipzig was decommissioned to be examined thoroughly in the Kaiserliche Werft there on 2 June. The inspection determined that the ship's hull was still in good condition, but it would not be economical to repair her machinery for another overseas deployment. The RMA therefore decided to convert the vessel into both a hulk for engine-room training and a barracks ship. In these capacities, she would replace the old frigate Vineta. Allocating the funds for the work proved to be controversial in the Reichstag, and so they were not approved until the 1895–1896 budget, though she had been struck from the naval register on 27 August 1894. Leipzig continued to serve for another twenty-five years in this capacity. The first wireless telegraphy school for the German navy was set up aboard the ship, and during World War I she was used for initial training for U-boat crews. On 5 November 1919, the ship suddenly sank in port for unknown reasons. She was later raised in 1921, sold to Hattinger Co., and broken up in Wilhelmshaven later that year.
