= SMS Elisabeth =

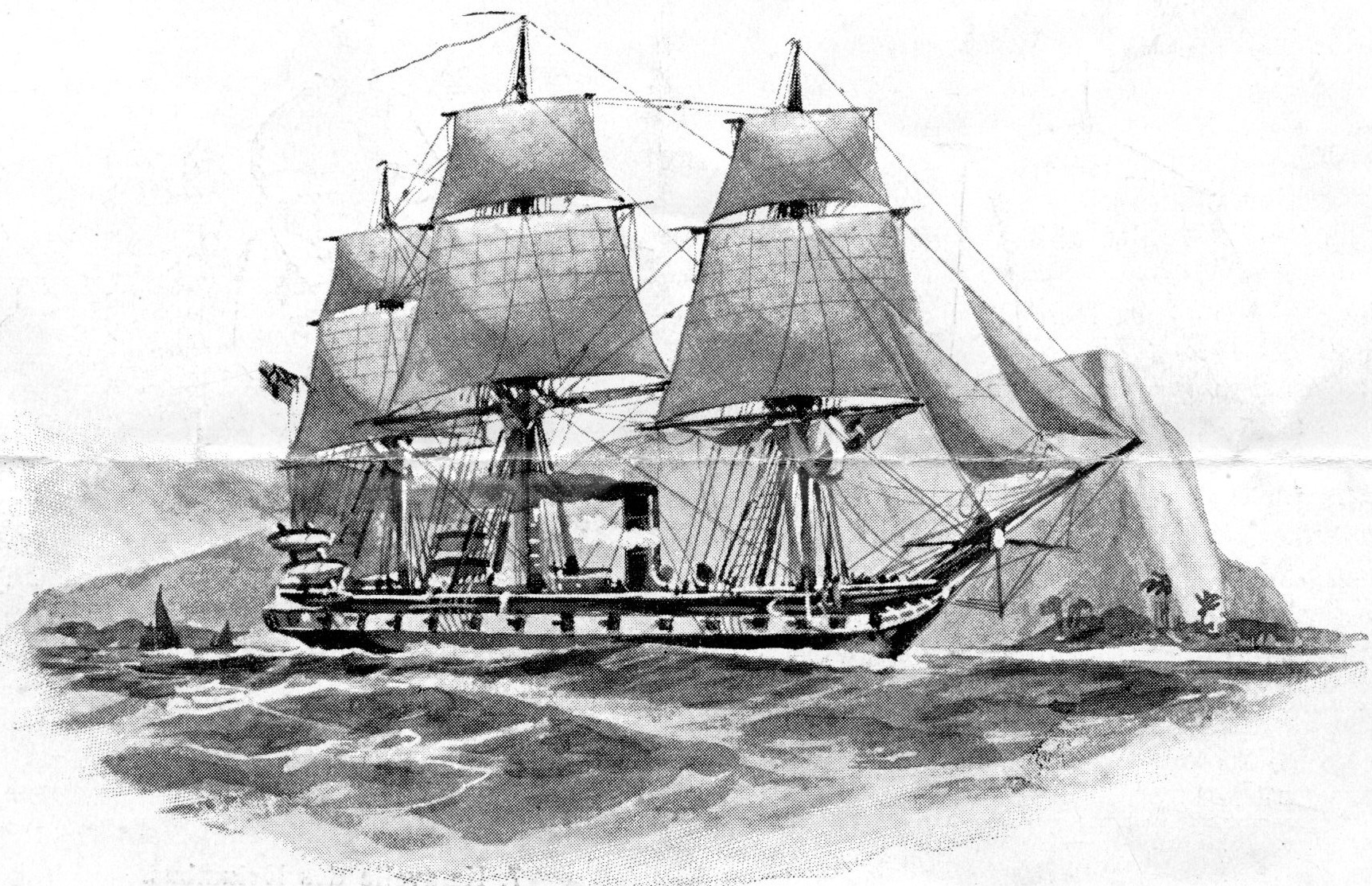
- Sketch of Elisabeth

History

Prussia
- Name: SMS Elisabeth
- Namesake: Elisabeth Ludovika of Bavaria
- Builder: Königliche Werft, Danzig
- Laid down: 1 May 1866
- Launched: 18 October 1868
- Commissioned: 29 September 1869
- Decommissioned: 29 April 1887
- Stricken: 20 September 1887
- Fate: Scrapped, 1904

General characteristics
- Class & type: Arcona-class frigate
- Displacement: 2,504 t (2,464 long tons)
- Length: 79.3 m (260 ft 2 in)
- Beam: 13.2 m (43 ft 4 in)
- Draft: 5.5 m (18 ft 1 in)
- Installed power: 4 × fire-tube boilers; 2,440 PS (2,410 ihp)
- Propulsion: 1 × marine steam engine; 1 × screw propeller
- Sail plan: Full-rigged ship
- Speed: 12.1 knots (22.4 km/h; 13.9 mph)
- Range: 1,900 nmi (3,500 km; 2,200 mi) at 10 knots (19 km/h; 12 mph)
- Complement: 35 officers; 345 enlisted men
- Armament: 28 × 68-pounder guns

SMS Elisabeth was the final member of the Arcona class of steam frigates built for the Prussian Navy in the 1860s. The class comprised five ships, and were the first major steam-powered warships ordered for the Prussian Navy. The ships were ordered as part of a major construction program to strengthen the nascent Prussian fleet, under the direction of Prince Adalbert, and were intended to provide defense against the Royal Danish Navy. Elisabeth was armed with a battery of twenty-eight guns, and was capable of steaming at a speed of 12.1 knots (22.4 km/h; 13.9 mph). Elisabeth was laid down in 1866, launched in 1868, and commissioned in 1869, by which time the Prussian Navy had been replaced by the North German Federal Navy.

Elisabeth joined a squadron that was sent to the Mediterranean Sea for the opening ceremonies for the Suez Canal in late 1869. She was activated during the Franco-Prussian War of 1870–1871, first as a guard ship during the French blockade of the North German coast. Plans to deploy the ship as a commerce raider later in the war came to nothing due to repeated problems with her propulsion system. After the war, in late 1872, she joined a squadron sent to the Caribbean Sea to protect German interests in the region. The following year, the squadron was recalled to the coast of Spain to protect German interests during the Third Carlist War there. The squadron was disbanded in early 1874, allowing Elisabeth to be sent to East Asia, but she was ordered home in early 1875. The ship embarked on another major overseas voyage in 1876, intended to be a circumnavigation of the globe. During the voyage in early 1878, she led an intervention in Nicaragua to force a payment owed to a German businessman. Elisabeth arrived home later that year.

The ship made two further overseas cruises in the early 1880s; the first, from 1881 to 1883, took the ship back to East Asia. Her time there passed relatively uneventfully, apart from an intervention in Xiamen on behalf of a German business there. The second overseas cruise lasted from 1884 to 1886, and during this voyage, she was heavily involved with the expansion of the German colonial empire, first in West Africa, then formally proclaiming the colony of German South West Africa. In 1885, she participated in flag-raising ceremonies in the colonies of Neupommern and Kaiser-Wilhelmsland. The cruise ended with the ship participating in a naval demonstration to defend Germany's claim to Wituland, which would soon become German East Africa. Limited training activities followed in the mid-1880s, until she was struck from the naval register in 1887. She was then used as a barracks ship, and then as a stationary training ship from 1888 to 1903. She was sold to ship breakers the following year, though some parts of the ship were preserved.

== Design ==
In the immediate aftermath of the First Schleswig War against Denmark, Prince Adalbert began drawing up plans for the future of the Prussian Navy; he also secured the Jade Treaty that saw the port of Wilhelmshaven transferred to Prussia from the Duchy of Oldenburg, and which provided the Prussian fleet with an outlet on the North Sea. Adalbert called for a force of three screw frigates and six screw corvettes to protect Prussian maritime trade in the event of another war with Denmark. Design work was carried out between 1854 and 1855, and the first two ships were authorized in November 1855; a further pair was ordered in June 1860, and the final member of the class was ordered in February 1866. The last vessel, Elisabeth, was modified slightly compared to the rest of the class, with a slightly larger hull, a different stern shape, and a smaller number of guns (albeit of a more modern type).

Elisabeth was 79.3 meters (260 ft 2 in) long overall and had a beam of 13.2 m (43 ft 4 in) and a draft of 5.5 m (18 ft 1 in) forward. She displaced 2,454 metric tons (2,415 long tons) as designed and 2,912 t (2,866 long tons) at full load. The ship had short forecastle and sterncastle decks. Her superstructure consisted primarily of a small deckhouse aft. She had a crew of 35 officers and 345 enlisted men.

Her propulsion system consisted of a single horizontal single-expansion steam engine driving a single screw propeller, with steam supplied by four coal-burning fire-tube boilers. Exhaust was vented through a single funnel located amidships. Elisabeth was rated to steam at a top speed of 9 knots (17 km/h; 10 mph), but she significantly exceeded this speed, reaching 12.1 knots (22.4 km/h; 13.9 mph) from 2,440 metric horsepower (2,410 ihp). The ship had a cruising radius of about 1,900 nautical miles (3,500 km; 2,200 mi) at a speed of 10 knots (19 km/h; 12 mph). To supplement the steam engine on long voyages abroad, she carried a full-ship rig with a total surface area of 2,200 m^{2} (24,000 sq ft). The screw could be retracted while cruising under sail.

Elisabeth was armed with a battery of twenty-eight 68-pounder guns. By 1869, she had been rearmed with a battery of seventeen 15 cm (5.9 in) RK L/22 guns.

== Service history ==
=== Construction and voyage to the Suez Canal ===
Authorization for a fifth frigate of the Arcona class was granted on 22 February 1866. The keel for Elisabeth was laid down at the Königliche Werft (Royal Dockyard) in Danzig on 1 May 1866. She was launched on 18 October 1868 and named after Elisabeth, the dowager queen. The wife of General Edwin Freiherr von Manteuffel performed the christening ceremony. By that time, Prussia had begun the process of German unification, and Elisabeth was the first ship to be launched under the flag of the North German Confederation. The date of the launching was chosen because it was the anniversary of the Battle of Leipzig, as well as the birthday of Crown Prince Friedrich Wilhelm. After completing fitting out work, she was commissioned into active service on 29 September 1869, under the command of Korvettenkapitän (KK—Corvette Captain) Hermann Robert Przewisinski. Sea trials were skipped so that Elisabeth could be sent as part of the squadron that represented North Germany at the opening of the Suez Canal; the other vessels included her sister ships Hertha and Arcona, the aviso Grille, and the gunboat Delphin. Elisabeth was only partially armed by that time, and part of her battery deck was converted to accommodation space for Friedrich Wilhelm and his entourage.

On 4 October, Elisabeth sailed from Neufahrwasser, stopping briefly in Kiel to embark a pair of engineers, who were to evaluate the ship's engine on the first leg of the voyage. By the time she reached Plymouth, United Kingdom, the engineers had determined that the engine had been installed badly and would require repairs. The ship nevertheless continued on to the Mediterranean Sea, stopping in Valletta, Malta; and Limassol and Beirut in the Ottoman Empire. On 15 November, Elisabeth joined the rest of the German squadron in Port Said, Ottoman Egypt, and the northern end of the Suez Canal. After the conclusion of the opening ceremonies on 1 December, the squadron was disbanded and Elisabeth embarked Friedrich Wilhelm and his entourage to carry them first to Naples, Italy. Friedrich Wilhelm went to meet King Vittorio Emanuele II.

She then sailed on to La Spezia, where the group returned to the ship. Elisabeth carried them to Villefranche-sur-Mer, France, and then returned to Italy to pick up a 70 t (69 long tons; 77 short tons) block of marble in Civitavecchia; the Pope had donated it for use in the Aachen Cathedral. During a subsequent stop in Cannes, France, Elisabeth was inspected by Prince Heinrich and Prince Wilhelm, then boys aged 10 and 7, respectively; officers took Heinrich to the top of the ship's rigging, though Wilhelm was not due to his crippled left arm. The ship stopped in Portsmouth, United Kingdom, on the way home, where it was found she needed to have her screw replaced; the work took six weeks to complete. During that time, a contingent from her crew were sent to bring the ship of the line Renown to Germany, which had been purchased from the Royal Navy for use as a training ship. Elisabeth then sailed to Vlissingen, the Netherlands, where the marble block was unloaded. From there, she sailed on to Kiel, arriving on 4 April, and she was decommissioned there on 23 April. After the voyage, Friedrich Wilhelm instructed General Albrecht von Stosch, a member of his party, to write a report on their experience aboard the ship. Stosch was very critical of the ship's condition and the state of training of the crew.

=== 1870–1875 ===
On 10 July 1870, Elisabeth was recommissioned for service during the Franco-Prussian War; the crew of the training ship Niobe were used to reactivate Elisabeth. The navy initially planned to deploy Elisabeth to its North Sea naval base at Wilhelmshaven, but reports of French warships already approaching the port led to a change of orders. Instead, the ship would be used to defend the mine barrier protecting the entrance to Kiel at Friedrichsort. She was supported in this role by Renown and the aviso Preussischer Adler. The French briefly attempted to impose a blockade of the German coast, but after they withdrew, the Germans made plans to send Elisabeth to attack French shipping as a commerce raider. In early October, she, Grille, and several gunboats sailed to Wilhelmshaven, and during the voyage, they evaded French vessels in heavy fog. Elisabeth's propulsion system proved to be problematic once again, and she was forced to stop in Glückstadt after her screw broke. Repairs were carried out, but after departing on 21 October, the propeller shaft broke, forcing the ship to be towed to Wilhelmshaven. She was the first vessel to be dry docked in the new facility there. After repairs were completed, Elisabeth was ordered in mid-January 1871 to sail to the Caribbean Sea (taking a route around the United Kingdom to avoid the French coast) to support the gunboat Meteor, but by that time, a ceasefire had come into effect that ended the fighting. Instead, Elisabeth was sent back to Kiel in company with the ironclad warship Arminius on 29 March, though severe storms delayed their arrival. Elisabeth was decommissioned there on 21 April.

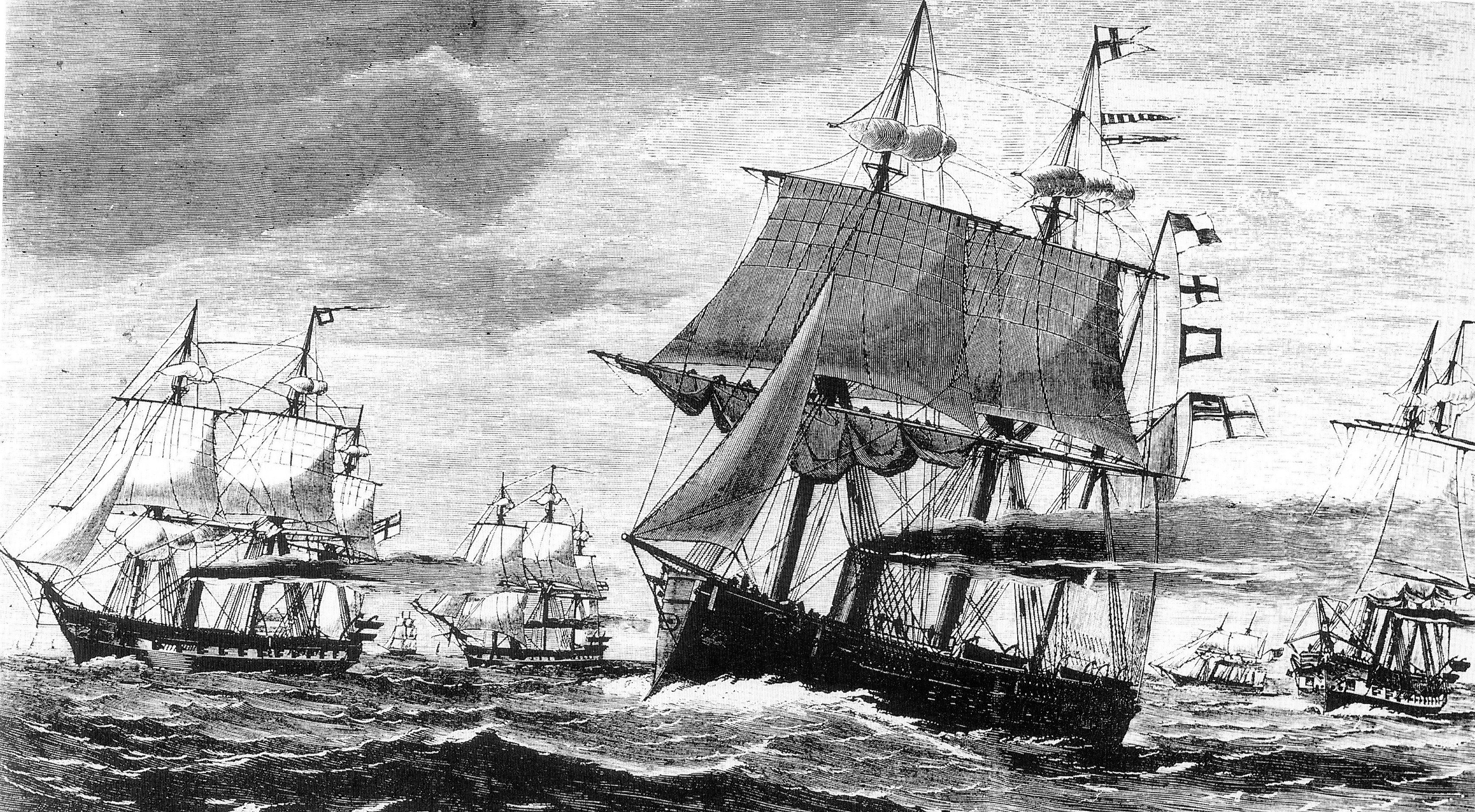
The Flying Squadron in 1872; Elisabeth is at right

Elisabeth was recommissioned on 18 December 1871, under the command of KK Paul von Reibnitz. She was to join a squadron of warships being sent to Central and South America, in part in response to mistreatment of the crew of the corvette Nymphe by Brazilian police in Rio de Janeiro. But Stosch, who had become the first Chief of the German Imperial Admiralty after the Prussian victory in 1871 saw the creation of the German Empire, canceled the planned operation over a dispute with Chancellor Otto von Bismarck. Elisabeth was accordingly decommissioned on 26 January 1872. At this time, she was placed in the category of First Reserve, which kept the ship in a state of readiness that allowed reactivation within five days.

Over the course of 1872, attacks on Germans in Haiti and Colombia prompted Stosch to reconsider his decision to cancel the deployment of warships to Central America, and on 1 October, Elisabeth was recommissioned, along with the ironclad Friedrich Carl and the gunboat Albatross. The squadron was placed under the command of Kommodore Reinhold von Werner; at that time, Elisabeth's captain was KK Otto Livonius. The three ships sailed from Wilhelmshaven on 10 October, and by 3 December, had reached Bridgetown, Barbados, where they joined Elisabeth's sisters Vineta and Gazelle. The five ships cruised through the Caribbean over the next few months, and soon after arriving in the region, Werner took the squadron to Colombia, where their presence convinced the government to pay a subsidy that had been promised to a German company that had build a railway line in the country. In early March 1873, Werner received orders to take the squadron to the coast of Spain to protect Germans during the Third Carlist War.

Elisabeth and the rest of the squadron arrived off the coast of Spain on 1 May, which the ships patrolled through late February 1874 in concert with a British squadron. At that point, the squadron was dissolved, and Elisabeth was ordered to East Asia. She sailed from Lisbon, Portugal, on 3 March, but had to stop in Valletta for repairs on the way. The ship arrived in Singapore on 26 May, and while en route to Hong Kong, she weathered a storm that nearly dismasted her. Elisabeth thereafter cruised in Japanese waters, and later in 1874, she went to Hakodate after the German consul there was murdered. On 4 January 1875, Livonius received orders to bring his ship home, and by 17 January, the ship had gotten underway. She arrived in Kiel on 13 April and moved to Danzig later that month, where she was decommissioned on 1 May. She thereafter underwent a major overhaul, which was completed by mid-1876. She was moved to Kiel on 28 May, where preparations for another extended voyage abroad, which was planned to complete a circumnavigation of the globe.

=== 1876–1878 ===
Elisabeth, in Xiamen, China, in the 1870s

Kapitän zur See (Captain at Sea) Wilhelm von Wickede took command of Elisabeth when she was recommissioned on 1 October 1876. She sailed from Kiel on 14 October, cruising south through the Atlantic Ocean, around the southern tip of Africa and across the Indian Ocean. Upon arriving in Singapore on 20 February 1877, Wickede took command of the ships in East Asian waters, as he was the senior-most captain in the region; this included Vineta, the corvette Luise, and the gunboats Nautilus and Cyclop. Elisabeth remained in Singapore for more than a month, eventually departing on 23 March. From there, she stopped in the Sulu Archipelago to settle disputes between German merchants and the local Spanish colonial government. The ship returned to Japanese waters, cruising through the Seto Inland Sea, and stopping in Yokohama in July. While the ship was in Yokohama, members of her crew fought men from the French ironclad Atalante. Elisabeth sailed on 30 July to assist a pair of barques, one Danish and the other German, that had wrecked nearby. Later that year, the ship conducted surveys of Ise Bay and the Tsugaru Strait.

On 5 December, Elisabeth received orders to sail to Central America. While in Honolulu, Hawaii, Wickede met with King Kalākaua on 12 January 1878. The ship then sailed on to Acapulco, Mexico, and on the way, her crew conducted depth soundings. She thereafter sailed south to visit Panama, where on 5 March, her crew helped to fight a major fire. There, she joined the corvettes Leipzig and Ariadne. Wickede took command of this temporarily formed squadron on 9 March with the title of Kommodore. Elisabeth then sailed to Nicaragua, where a dispute between a German businessman and local residents remained unresolved, and had escalated to the point that the German consul had been attacked. A major expedition was planned to punish those responsible and extract compensation from the Nicaraguan government. The corvette Medusa, which was then in the Caribbean, was ordered to block arms shipments from the Atlantic, while Elisabeth and the other ships on the Pacific coast prepared a landing party of some 400 men. On 18 March, the German squadron arrived off Corinto, where the landing party went ashore. Elisabeth's executive officer went to Managua with an ultimatum on 22 March demanding punishment for those involved in the dispute, a payment of $30,000, and an exchange of salutes for the German and Nicaraguan flags. The government agreed to the demands, and by 31 March, the dispute was settled with the exchange of salutes.

On 7 April, the squadron was disbanded; Elisabeth and Leipzig cruised together briefly, before Elisabeth departed southward to return home. She visited numerous ports along the Pacific coast of South America, passed through the Strait of Magellan in mid-July, and stopped again in Montevideo, Uruguay on the way to Germany. The ship eventually reached Kiel on 6 October, after which she moved back to Danzig, where she was decommissioned on 2 November. She underwent an extensive overhaul there the following year.

=== 1881–1904 ===
Elisabeth remained out of service until late 1881, when she was recommissioned on 1 October, under the command of KzS Friedrich von Hollmann. She returned to her role as a training ship, and was to make another overseas cruise over the next two years. She departed Kiel on 18 October and sailed south through the Atlantic, around South America, and across the Pacific to Japan. There, she replaced Hertha in the East Asia Squadron, which at that time was led by KzS Louis von Blanc aboard his flagship Stosch. Elisabeth thereafter cruised in Japanese and Chinese waters, and in late 1882, she and the rest of the squadron intervened in a commercial conflict in Xiamen, China. A German manufacturing company located in the city produced pans for refining tea and sugar, but the local customs authority confiscated several of the pans to force the company to pay import duties. Elisabeth and Stosch sent landing parties ashore to seize the pans and return them to the manufacturer. Elisabeth was ordered to return home in February 1883, though she remained in Hong Kong until 19 April, when she was released from the squadron. She sailed around Africa, making a number of stops in the southern coast of West Africa (along the so-called Slave Coast and Gold Coast) to survey German economic interests in the region. The ship eventually arrived in Kiel on 27 September, and she was decommissioned there on 13 October.

After an overhaul at Kiel, Elisabeth was recommissioned on 16 April 1884 for what would be her final overseas training cruise. At that time, she came under the command of KzS Rudolf Schering. After embarking the cadet class of 1883, he ship sailed from Kiel on 3 May and stopped first in Nieuwediep, the Netherlands, to respond to the numerous courtesy visits of Dutch warships in German ports in recent years. From there, Elisabeth sailed to Portsmouth, where she embarked an expedition organized by Adolf Lüderitz to survey the coast of Namibia. The ship got underway again on 22 May. Off Cape St. Vincent, she met the gunboat Möwe, which was carrying the German colonialist Gustav Nachtigal on a mission to establish the German colony of Kamerun. The two ships cruised together to Dubréka and sent a landing party ashore to escort Nachtigal so he could attempt to negotiate German colonial claims in the area. Elisabeth thereafter continued south, stopping in Freetown on 23–24 June, before arriving off Angra Pequena, where Lüderitz had already purchased land. There, she met Leipzig on 6 August, which had sailed independently from Asia. Lüderitz quickly pronounced the colony of German South West Africa, and the two ships participated in the raising of the German flag at Angra Pequena—now renamed Lüderitz Bay—on 7 August. Elisabeth then sailed to Cape Town, South Africa, where she received orders to sail to the south Pacific to further Germany's colonial interests in the region.

Elisabeth in Cape Town

Elisabeth crossed the Indian Ocean to Sydney, Australia, before turning north toward Matupi, which she reached on 1 November. She met the gunboat Hyäne there, and the ships proclaimed the colony of Neupommern (New Pommerania) that day. The ships then sailed to Mioko Islands, where they established German colonial rule on 4 November. Schering then transferred to Hyäne to tour several of the smaller islands in the region to conduct further flag-raising ceremonies, returning to the frigate on 14 November. Elisabeth then sailed to several locations along the newly created colony of Kaiser-Wilhelmsland, raising the German flag at Astrolabe Bay, Friedrich-Wilhelmshafen, Prinz Heinrichhafen, and Finschhafen. The ship then returned to Matupi on 20 November, where she met her replacement, the corvette Marie. Elisabeth departed for Yokohama, Japan, arriving on 2 January 1885. From there, she sailed to Hong Kong, where on 24 February she met Stosch, still serving as the flagship of the East Asia Squadron. Elisabeth thereafter cruised through the region, and while in Batavia in the Dutch East Indies, she received orders to join a new cruiser squadron formed off the coast of East Africa.

In early July, the squadron assembled in Port Louis in Mauritius; the squadron consisted of Stosch, the corvettes Gneisenau and Prinz Adalbert, and the chartered steamship SS Ehrenfels. The first operation the new squadron embarked upon was a search for the corvette Augusta, which had disappeared in the Gulf of Aden. The search began around the Maldives and the Chagos Archipelago, but the ships were unable to locate the missing vessel. On 7 July, the squadron left Port Louis, bound for Zanzibar. The squadron anchored off Zanzibar on 7 August, surprising the sultan of Zanzibar Barghash bin Said, who disputed Germany's most recent colonial acquisition, the protectorate of Wituland, which formed the nucleus of what was to become German East Africa. The Germans negotiated on the basis of three demands: that bin Said recognize the German protectorate in Wituland, conclude a separate trade and friendship treaty, and name his nephew, the son of his sister Emily Ruete, as his successor. The German squadron was soon reinforced by the corvette Bismarck and the gunboats Möwe and Hyäne; the assemblage of ships was the largest force Germany had deployed abroad to that point. Bin Said agreed to the first two terms, but the third was deferred for the time being.

In late October, Elisabeth was detached to return home. She passed through Cape Town on 28 November, where she received orders to sail to Uruguay in response to an expected revolution. During shooting practice on 12 December, an accidental explosion killed one man and wounded another fourteen. The ship arrived in Montevideo on 16 January 1886, but she remained there for just five days before departing for home. Stopping in Freetown and then St. Vincent along the way, she arrived in Plymouth on 19 March. Here, she joined the newly created Training Squadron, led by the flagship Stein. The ships arrived in Kiel on 2 April, and Elisabeth was decommissioned there eleven days later.

Elisabeth was recommissioned for the last time on 1 October 1886, under the command of Kapitänleutnant (Captain Lieutenant) Hunold von Ahlefeld, to temporarily replace the corvette Blücher as the training ship for the torpedo school. By that time, the ship's sailing rig had been removed, and she was fitted with a single pole mast for signalling purposes. Deck houses were also built on the vessel. During this period, she suffered another accident that resulted in the death of two naval cadets; another eight were wounded in the incident, one of whom later died. The ship was decommissioned on 29 April 1887, and on 20 September, she was struck from the naval register. The ship was initially used as a barracks ship in Kiel for the 1st Torpedo-Detachment, and then from 1888 to 1903 as a machinery training hulk for boiler and engine room crews. In 1904, she was sold to ship breakers in Stettin, Germany, where she was dismantled. Her figurehead was preserved, and was displayed at the Mürwik Naval School for many years; as of 1993, it was on loan to the German Maritime Museum in Bremerhaven.
