= Germany–Nicaragua relations =

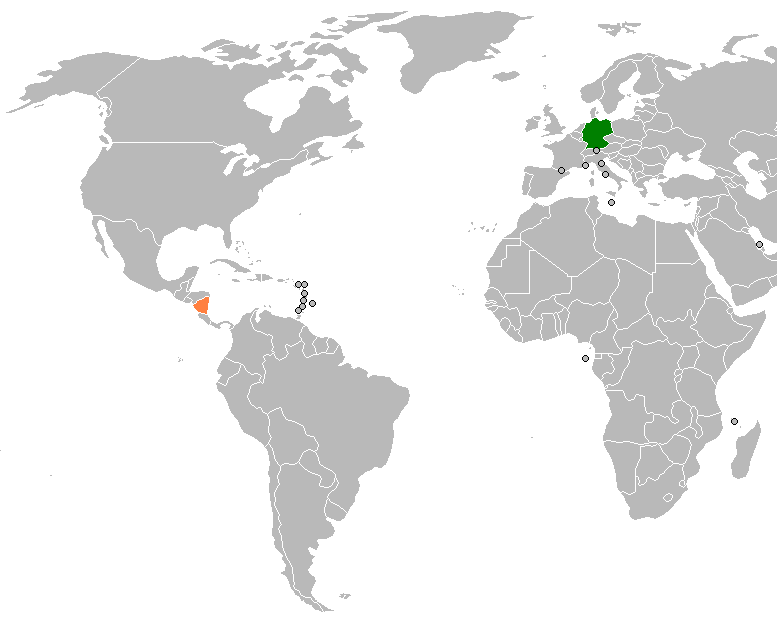

- Germany: Nicaragua

Germany–Nicaragua relations are friendly and are characterized by the numerous solidarity movements and aid associations in East and West Germany that were formed in the 1970s and 1980s. In 2024 relations became tense after Nicaragua accused Germany of aiding genocide in Palestine.

== History ==
The first German immigrants settled in Nicaragua in the early 19th century, which had declared its independence from Spain in 1821. In 1844, Prince Charles of Prussia and Otto Victor I von Schönburg had the area around Bluefields on the Miskito coast explored; however, the founding of a Bavarian colony failed shortly afterward. After German unification, the German Empire increased its trade activities in Central America and established diplomatic representation in Nicaragua, among other places. The Eisenstück affair in 1876-1878 led to a diplomatic-military dispute between the German Empire and Nicaragua. After the German consul Christian Moritz Eisenstück had been beaten up and arrested, the German Empire demanded compensation of 30,000 US dollars for the consul's treatment. After Nicaragua refused to pay compensation, the Foreign Office finally asked the Imperial Admiralty for support in August 1877, which dispatched several battleships to Nicaragua. On 31 March 1878 the Nicaraguan government finally gave in and paid compensation. The case was exemplary of European gunboat diplomacy and German aspirations for world power in the late 19th century.

During the Second World War, Nicaragua, under the authoritarian president Anastasio Somoza García, declared war on the Nazi regime on 11 December 1941, which led to the internment of Germans in the country. After the war, Nicaragua established diplomatic relations with the Federal Republic of Germany in 1954. Numerous solidarity committees and Nicaragua clubs were formed in Germany at the end of the 1970s. In the Nicaraguan Revolution, the West German left and the West German student movement had great sympathies for the Sandinistas. In 1979, left-wing activists attempted to occupy the Nicaraguan embassy in Bonn in protest against the dictatorship of the Somoza family. After the Sandinistas overthrew the authoritarian Somoza dictatorship, which was allied with the West, the FRG government cut off financial aid to Nicaragua, while at the same time civil society contacts were expanded. After taking power, the Sandinistas established diplomatic relations with the German Democratic Republic, where many solidarity committees for Nicaragua had also been formed. Over the next ten years, almost 15,000 Germans travelled to Nicaragua and took part in projects such as literacy campaigns. In 1983, the German doctor and development aid worker Albrecht Pflaum was killed in an attack by the Contras, which led to the occupation of the West German embassy in Managua by German exiles. Support for the Contras by Western countries also led to protests in the Federal Republic.

In the 1980s and 1990s, close civil society contacts were established with Nicaragua and many twinning agreements were concluded between cities in Nicaragua and Germany. Close contacts between the two countries have continued into the 21st century.

=== Nicaragua v. Germany ===
In spring 2024, Nicaragua filed a complaint against Germany with the International Court of Justice. According to Nicaragua, in light of the Gaza war, Germany's political, financial and military support for Israel was aiding and abetting genocide of Palestinians in the Gaza Strip. In April 2024, Nicaragua closed its embassy in Berlin. Nicaragua's urgent appeal was rejected on 30 April, but so was Germany's application to dismiss the case, which will therefore continue.

In late April 2024, according to Politico Europe, Western intelligence agencies and diplomats reported that Nicaragua's case against Germany at the International Court of Justice may have been initiated by Russia, which is allied with Nicaragua. The aim may have been to undermine the credibility of the court by turning it into a "venue for specious legal disputes". Nicaragua accuses Germany of being complicit in the killing of civilians in the ongoing Gaza war through arms exports to Israel and demands the immediate cessation of arms shipments and the resumption of UNRWA funding.

== Economic relations ==
The total volume of trade with Nicaragua amounted to over 152 million euros in 2021, putting Nicaragua in 129th place in the ranking of German trading partners. The country therefore plays a rather subordinate role in German foreign trade. However, there have been significant investments in Nicaragua by German companies, such as the 2002 construction of a cocoa plantation by Alfred Ritter, a German company that is one of the largest employers in Nicaragua. The German automotive company Dräxlmaier is also an important employer in the Nicaragua.

In 2017, almost 18,000 German tourists visited Nicaragua.

=== Development aid ===
In addition to the German government's development aid, over 30 non-governmental organizations and private associations from Germany are involved in development cooperation with Nicaragua, most of which date back to the solidarity movement of the 1980s. German development aid also takes place within the framework of 25 city partnerships. The Federal Ministry for Economic Cooperation and Development finances annual volunteer programs that enable almost 150 young people to participate in projects each year.

One focus of bilateral development aid is water (wastewater and drinking water supply).

== Culture ==
In Managua, there is the German Nicaraguan Cultural Initiative (ICAN), which receives funding from the Goethe-Institut. There are also numerous private "Nicaragua associations" in Germany that carry out projects or cultural work, including in Hamburg, Oldenburg, Wiesbaden and Göttingen. The German School Managua ("Deutsche Schule Managua") is one of the best schools in the country.

=== Migration ===
Emigration from Germany to Nicaragua began in the 19th century. In 2022, just under 1000 persons born in Germany were living in Nicaragua, while several hundred Nicaraguans were living in Germany.
