= Eisenstück affair =

1877–1878 diplomatic–military incident

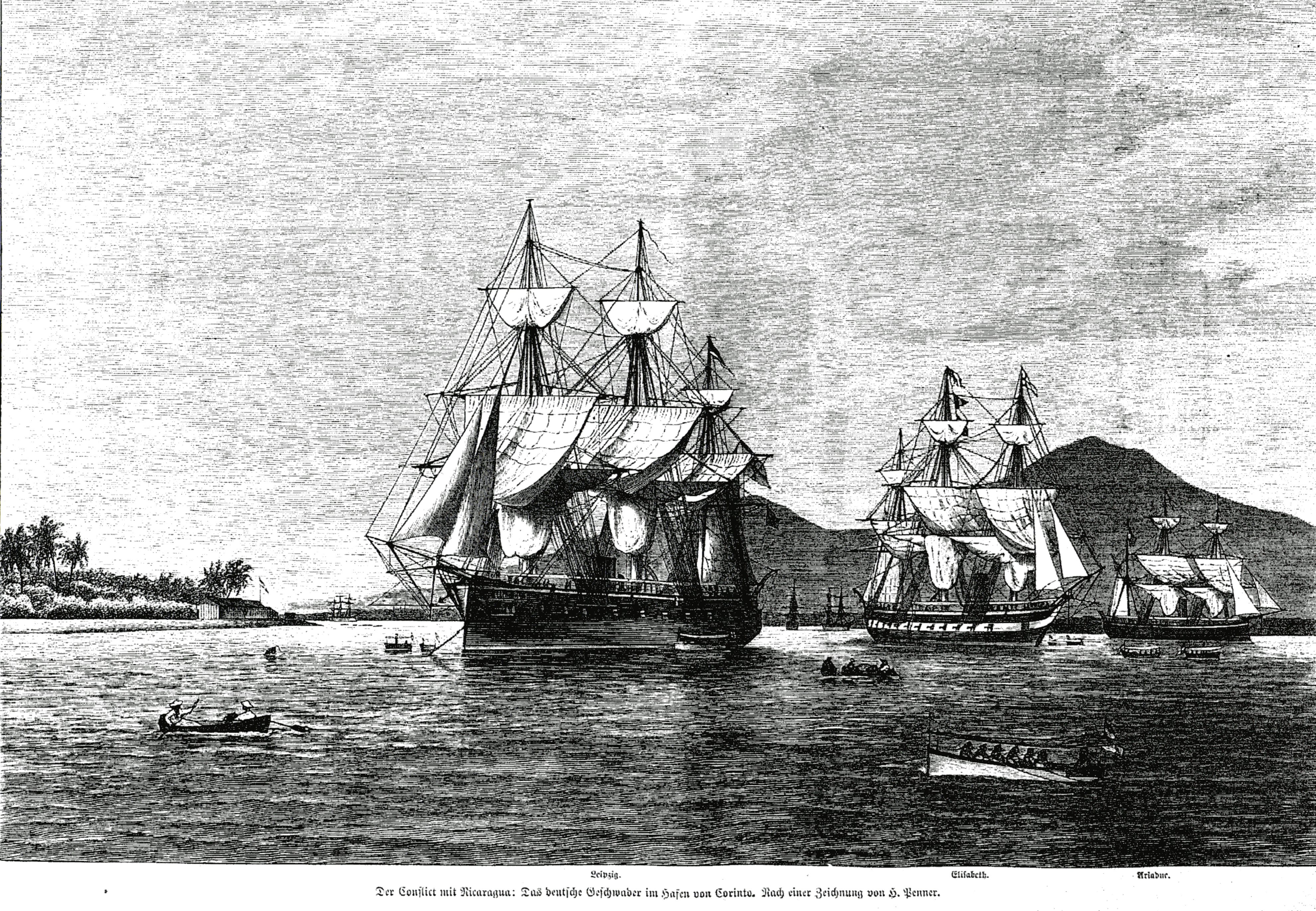
- SMS Leipzig, SMS Elisabeth, and SMS Ariadne at Corinto, Nicaragua, in March 1878
| Date | 1877 – April 1878 |
| Location | Corinto and Grey Town, Nicaragua 12°29′00″N 87°10′22″W |
| Result | German victory: Nicaragua pays Germany a US$30,000 indemnity; Nicaraguan soldiers salute the Reichskriegsflagge |

Belligerents
| German Empire | Nicaragua |

Commanders and leaders
| Bernhard von Bülow; Werner von Bergen; Wilhelm von Wickede; Friedrich Hollmann | Pedro Chamorro |

Strength
| 6 warships; 1,100 sailors | Unknown |

Casualties and losses
- None

The Eisenstück affair (German: Eisenstück-Affäre, Spanish: asunto Eisenstück), codenamed Operation Nicaragua by the Imperial German Navy, was a diplomatic-military incident involving the German Empire and Nicaragua in 1877 and 1878.

In 1876, German consul to Nicaragua Christian Moritz Eisenstück was arrested following a shooting involving him, his brother Paul, and Paul's stepdaughter over a marriage dispute with Nicaraguan Francisco Leal. German foreign minister Bernhard Ernst von Bülow demanded the prosecution of the shooting's perpetrators, the payment of a US$30,000 indemnity, and for Nicaraguan soldiers to salute the German flag. The situation led to diplomatic tensions between Germany and Nicaragua that would involve the governments of the United Kingdom and the United States, both of which sided with Germany.

In 1878, the Imperial German Navy deployed six warships to Nicaragua to ensure that Bülow's demands were met. Ships were stationed at the Nicaraguan city of Corinto and Grey Town, with German sailors landing at the latter. On 31 March 1878, the Nicaraguan government agreed to pay the indemnity and salute the German flag.

== Background ==
During the 1860s, German merchants and entrepreneurs began creating business investments in Central America in commerce, mining, plantations, and trade. Germans also attempted to establish settlements in the region but only succeeded in Guatemala and Costa Rica; they abandoned attempts in the Mosquito Coast and Nicaragua due to poor climactic conditions. By the 1870s, Germans were among the largest investors in Central America, around 100 of whom were in Nicaragua.

== Eisenstück shootings ==
In 1871, Franzika Bahlke, stepdaughter of German businessman Paul Eisenstück, married Nicaraguan dentist Francisco Leal against her parents' wishes. Around 1876, Bahlke and her daughter left Leal and moved back in with her parents, claiming that Leal was abusive. Leal attempted to convince Paul and Ida (Bahlke's mother) to return Bahlke to him but Paul refused.

On 23 October 1876, Isidoro Infante, the son of a family friend, fired three, one at Ida (which missed) and two in the air. Ida suspected that Leal was behind the shooting. Paul and his family sought legal action against Infante, but after five weeks, no investigation had yet begun. A second shooting occurred on 29 November 1876 where around 20 police officers led by Leal attacked Bahlke, her daughter, her parents, Christian Moritz Eisenstück (Paul's brother and the German consul to Nicaragua), and two others. They kidnapped Bahlke and her daughter and arrested Paul and Christian, although they were later released when the police officers learned about Christian's diplomatic status. Paul and Christian met with Nicaraguan president Pedro Chamorro later that day and demanded that action be taken. Chamorro agreed to instruct the chief of police of León to investigate.

== Diplomatic tensions ==
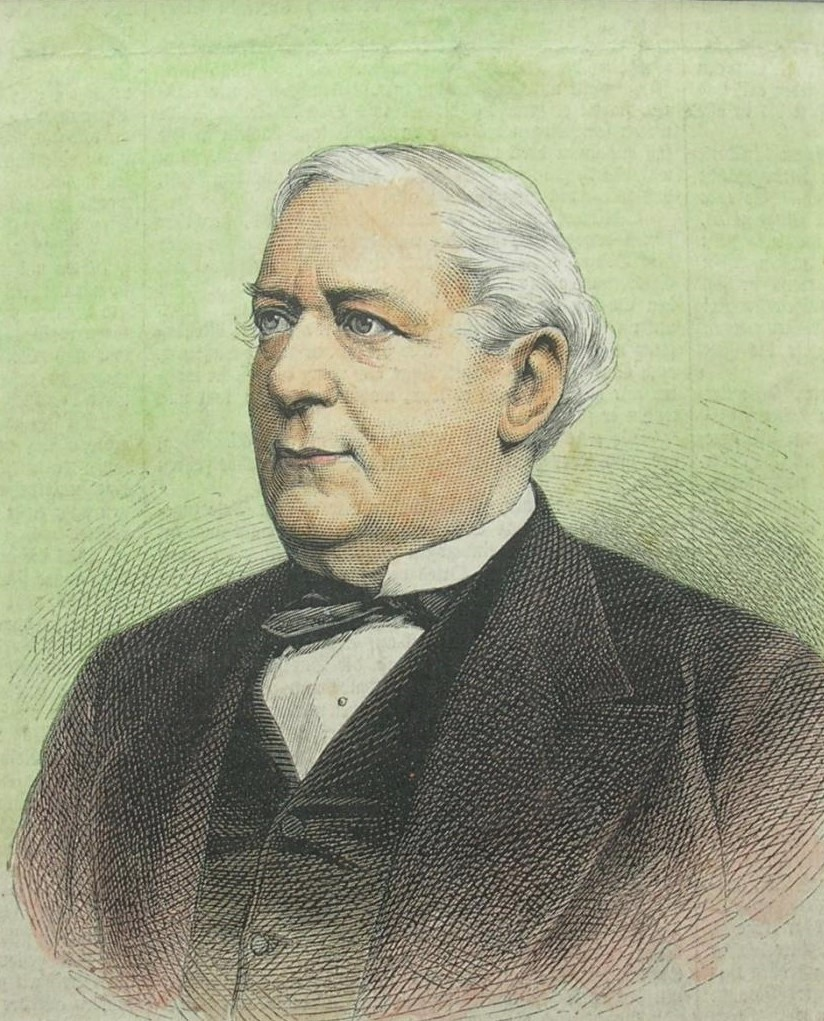
German foreign minister Bernhard Ernst von Bülow in 1877

In January and February 1877, Christian advised the German Foreign Office that neither the injured parties nor witnessed had been summoned to court regarding the shootings. Christian later demanded the Nicaraguan government take responsibility for the shootings. Nicaraguan foreign minister Anselmo Rivas held that the shootings were a "family matter" instead of a diplomatic one.

On 1 April 1877, German foreign minister Bernhard Ernst von Bülow sent a letter to German minister to Nicaragua Werner von Bergen outlining reparations he was to demand from Nicaragua for the shootings and the lack of legal accountability. The demands included "severe punishment" ("Strenge Bestrafung") for the shootings' perpetrators, punishment for the government officials who were delaying legal proceedings from occurring, the payment of a US$30,000 (equivalent to $907,031 in 2025) indemnity to Christian, and that Nicaraguan soldiers salute the German flag. Bülow argued that the lack of legal proceedings was a denial of justice. Bergen advised the Nicaraguan government that Germany would dispatch warships if the flag salute was not performed.

On 9 April 1877, the Supreme Court of Justice of Nicaragua ruled that Paul threatened Leal with a revolver before the second shooting and that Ida struck Leal with an iron bolt. It held Paul and Ida liable and referred them for prosecution. The German government sought to obtain diplomatic support from the United Kingdom and the United States claiming that the rights and security of foreigners in Nicaragua was in danger. Nicaraguan diplomat José de Marcoleta accused the German government of intentionally turning the shooting into an international affair and seeking British and American support as it lacked the military means to take action itself. German diplomats Georg Herbert Münster and Kurd von Schlözer presented the case to the British and American governments, respectively, and both received those governments' diplomatic support. American minister to Nicaragua George Williamson described the Supreme Court of Justice's ruling as a "prearranged burlesque upon justice" and a "prearranged comedy".

On 29 June 1877, von Bergen and Williamson demanded an audience with Chamorro to hold the shootings' perpetrators responsible, but Chamorro's government declined and offered to schedule the meeting for the following day as Chamorro was celebrating his birthday that coincided with the Catholic feast day of Saint Peter. Von Bergen and Williamson both left, taking the Nicaraguan's decline as an insult. Williamson further described it as "unfriendly, and, indeed, purposely impolite". Nicaragua–United States relations were subsequently severed over this incident and would not be restored until the Eisenstück affair was resolved. Rivas protested Williamson's support for Germany to the American government, arguing that it undermined the Monroe Doctrine, a U.S. policy that prohibits Europeans from attempting to reestablish colonies in the Americas. Williamson accused Rivas of being a "mendacious negro statesman" but later acknowledged that Rivas' argument held merit as the apparent abandonment of the Monroe Doctrine from Europe's perspective would weaken American influence in the region.

Rivas sent a message to most Latin American countries hoping to form an alliance to ensure Nicaraguan independence. The governments of Colombia, El Salvador, Guatemala, and Venezuela pledged to support Nicaragua, but Guatemalan president Justo Rufino Barrios later advised Nicaragua to accept German demands in fear of a potential German naval show of force disrupting the region's economy and none of those governments ever sent support. The Peruvian government advised Nicaragua to seek international arbitration and the Argentine government stated that it would conduct its own investigation. Marcoleta attempted to turn the British against the Germans by comparing the present situation to the 1854 Borlund affair (the American bombardment of Grey Town) and the 1855–1857 Walker affair (the American filibuster invasion of Nicaragua), to no avail.

== German naval deployment ==
"War preparations against Nicaragua were in full swing; the landing corps was being formed, and due to the lack of suitable footwear in the tropics, the entire seafaring crew was dressed in woolen stockings and high boots. A completely reliable protection against sand fleas is necessary, but on the other hand, the heat had a terrible effect on the poor legs in this clothing. Even the most frequent inspections could not prevent the repeated discovery of people who had discarded their stockings." (Note: German: Die Kriegsvorbereitungen gegen Nicaragua waren in vollem Gange, es wurde das Landungskorps gebildet und mangels einer zweckmäßigen Fußbekleidung in den Tropen die ganze seemännische Besatzung in wollene Strümpfe und hohe Stiefel gesteckt. Ein durchaus sicherer Schutz gegen den Sandfloh ist notwendig, aber andererseits wirkte die Hitze furchtbar auf die armen Beine in dieser Bekleidung. Noch so häufige Musterungen konnten nicht verhindern, daß immer wieder Leute gefunden wurden, die sich der Strümpfe entledigt hatten.)

— Corvette Captain Carl Paschen, c. 1878

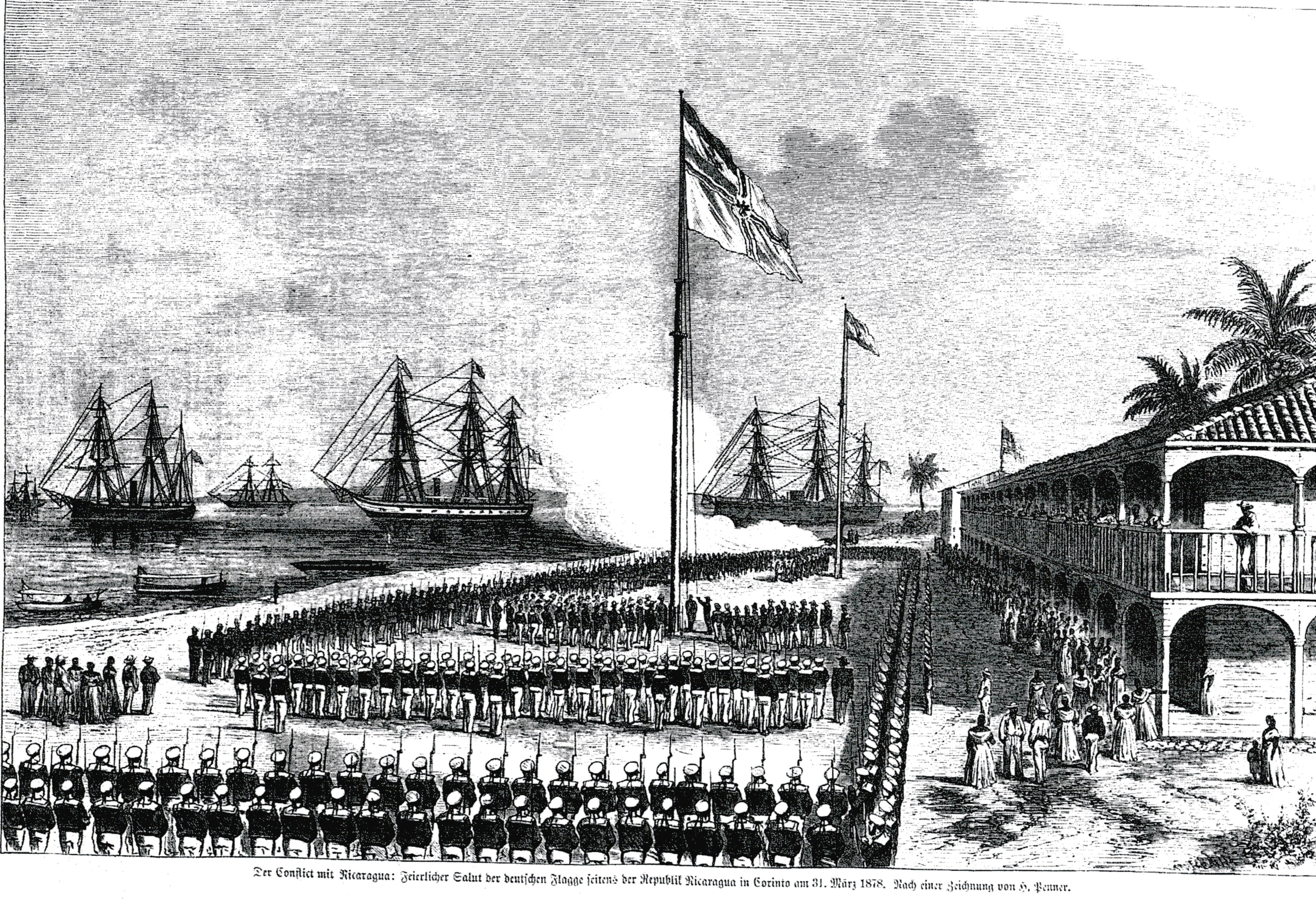
A drawing by Hermann Penner published in Illustrirte Zeitung depicting Nicaraguan soldiers saluting the Reichskriegsflagge in Corinto on 31 March 1878

In September 1877, after von Bergen failed to meet Chamorro, the German Foreign Office asked the German Imperial Admiralty to "consider the possibility of a military demonstration" ("Eventualität einer militärischen Demonstration") in Nicaragua. The Admiralty stated that this would be possible during a replacement of the ships of the East Asia Squadron. Bülow assured the American government that an intervention would not violate the Monroe Doctrine as Germany had a right to protect its citizens and that Germany had no intentions to interfere in Nicaraguan domestic affairs.

The Imperial German Navy launched "Operation Nicaragua" and dispatched warships to Panamá, among them, the screw corvettes SMS Leipzig and SMS Ariadne from Germany and the screw frigate SMS Elisabeth from Japan. There, these ships, collectively the "Central American Squadron" ("Zentralamerikanischen Geschwaders"), came under the command of Sea Captain Wilhelm von Wickede on 9 March 1878. The crew totaled around 1,100 sailors.

On 17 March 1878, the screw corvette SMS Medusa commanded by Corvette Captain Friedrich Hollmann arrived in Grey Town and landed 150 sailors. There were rumors that Nicaragua was sending 800 soldiers to confront the Germans at Grey Town. The following day, the Central American Squadron arrived off the coast of the Nicaraguan city of Corinto and landed some sailors that inspected buildings that would be suitable for a potential occupation. They also inspected lagoons for naval mines. Lieutenant Captain Felix Stubenrauch sent an ultimatum to Chamorro's government in Managua demanding that Bülow's 1 April 1877 demands be fulfilled within 24 hours. He also demanded that the mayor of León be held responsible for dispatching police officers to support Leal during the second shooting. Stubenrauch added that if the demands were not met, Germany would sever relations with Nicaragua, they would institute a further $8,000 (equivalent to $241,875 in 2025) fine, and that the Nicaraguan government would be responsible for anything that happens afterwards.

On 20 March, after the ultimatum was ignored, the sailors of Medusa seized the cargo of the British schooner Emmeline Salcombre at Grey Town as it was intended for the city. HMS Contest arrived from Jamaica on 6 April to monitor the situation. Medusa released Emmeline Salcombre's cargo in mid April after the Eisenstück affair had been resolved.

Fearing a German invasion, Chamorro's government acquiesced to Germany's demands. On 31 March, the government brought the requested $30,000 to the Central American Squadron and Nicaraguan soldiers saluted the Reichskriegsflagge in Corinto. On 6 April, the mayor of León was fined $500 (equivalent to $15,117 in 2025) and banned from seeking public office for five years. Meanwhile, Leal faced no consequences for the events that unfolded and Bahlke, despite being kidnapped by Leal, remained with him. The Eisenstück affair ended with no casualties on either side.

== Aftermath ==
According to German historian Ragnhild Fiebig-von Hase, the affected interest groups in Germany sought a solution to the new problems by strengthening German naval power; the fleet was to be developed into an instrument with which the German Empire could assert its "claims" in Latin America, even against the United States if necessary. Fiebig-von Hase identified the Eisenstück affair as one of the first instances of the German Empire using naval power to assert its influence in Latin America. In June 1878, von Bülow expressed that the conclusion of the Eisenstück affair would guarantee the safety of foreigners in Central America. He also believed that a forceful response like that which occurred during the Eisenstück affair would intimidate future opposition to German imperial interests. He later wrote to Bergen that he sought to maintain friendly relations with the governments in the Americas and that cordial conduct between Germans and local authorities can prevent "overseas complications" ("überseeischen Verwicklungen").

According to von Wickede, a further escalation of the affair and a Nicaraguan civil war would have damaged Germany's reputation in Latin America. He theorized that Chamorro's government acquiesced to Germany's demands as quickly as it did because Chamorro feared the potential of a civil war erupting if the situation became prolonged. He also may have feared that Germany would have supported the rival Democratic Party in such a civil war. The Eisenstück affair was Germany's largest military operation in Latin America until the Venezuelan crisis of 1902–1903.

German investments in Nicaragua continued after the Eisenstück affair. In 1893, José Santos Zelaya overthrew Nicaragua's Conservative government and became president. Zelaya promoted increased trade relations with Germany, and in 1896, the German and Nicaraguan governments signed a trade treaty. According to German author Götz van Houwald, the treaty was signed as Bergen (still in office by 1896) was able to "make people forget what happened back then" ("vergessen machen, was damals geschah").

German newspapers celebrated the affair, praising it for protecting German citizens and calling it a "most beneficial influence" ("heilsamsten Einfluß") for "uncivilized people" ("unzivilisierte Völker"). Lawrence Sondhaus, a history professor at the University of Indianapolis, described the affair as a "classic example of gunboat politics" ("klassisches Beispiel von Kanonenbootpolitik"). Nicaraguan journalist Enrique Guzmán described the payment of the $30,000 indemnity as "a day of eternal shame for Nicaragua" ("einen Tag ewiger Schande für Nicaragua"). The German government used the money to pay teachers and junior government officials over the following months.

== See also ==
- Nicaragua Crisis of 1894–1895, the British occupation of Corinto
