= SMS Ariadne (1871) =

Screw corvette of the Prussian and German Imperial Navy

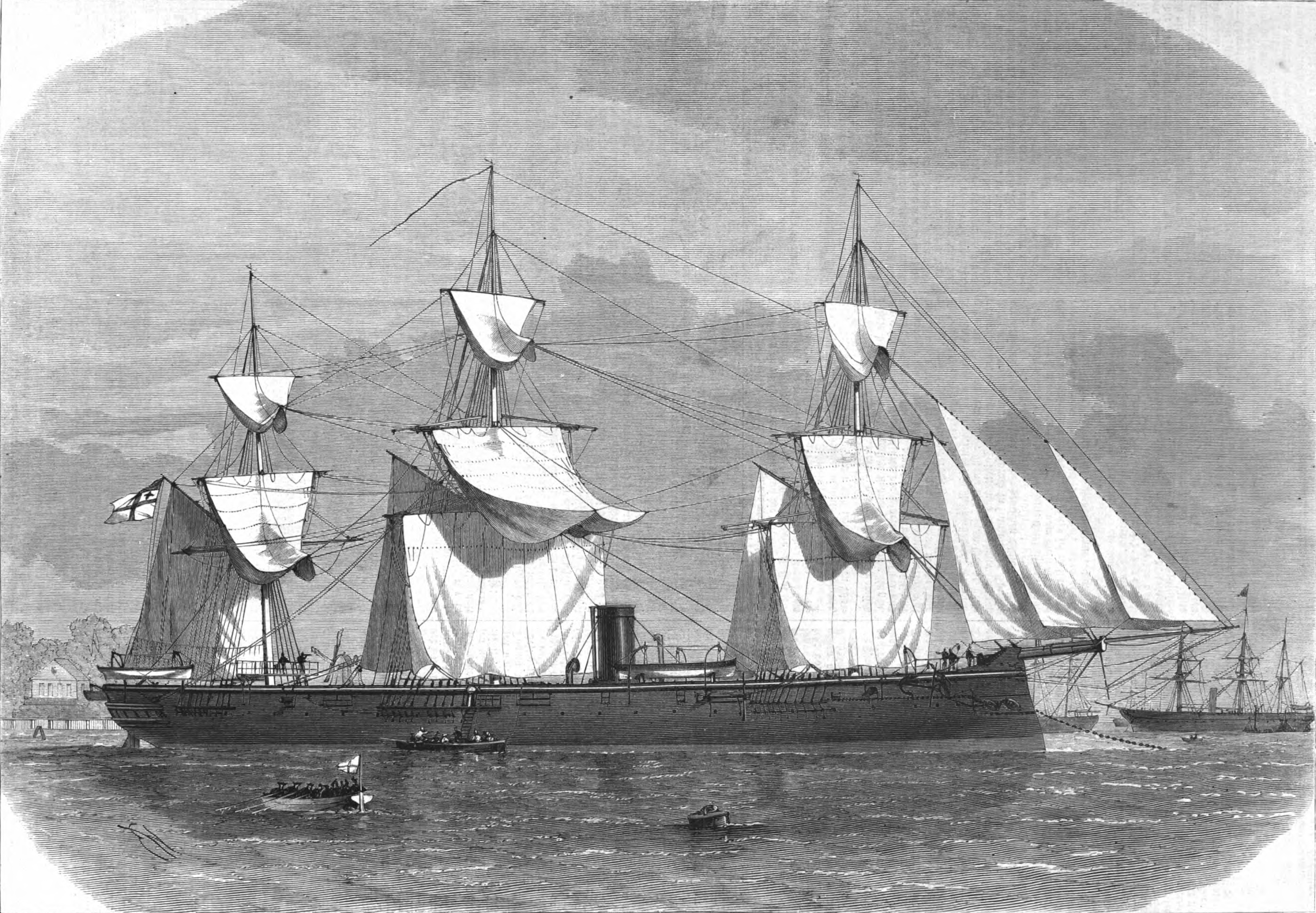
- Illustration of Ariadne, c. 1871

History

German Empire
- Name: Ariadne
- Namesake: Ariadne
- Builder: Königliche Werft, Danzig
- Laid down: 1868
- Launched: 21 July 1871
- Commissioned: 23 November 1872
- Decommissioned: 30 September 1890
- Stricken: 14 April 1891
- Fate: Broken up, 1891

General characteristics
- Class & type: Ariadne-class corvette
- Displacement: Full load: 2,072 metric tons (2,039 long tons)
- Length: 68.16 meters (223 ft 7 in) (loa)
- Beam: 10.8 m (35 ft 5 in)
- Draft: 4.8 m (15 ft 9 in)
- Installed power: 4 × fire-tube boilers; 2,100 metric horsepower (2,100 ihp)
- Propulsion: 1 × marine steam engine; 1 × screw propeller
- Sail plan: Full-rigged ship
- Speed: 14 knots (26 km/h; 16 mph)
- Range: 1,340 nautical miles (2,480 km; 1,540 mi) at 10 kn (19 km/h; 12 mph)
- Crew: 13 officers; 220 sailors
- Armament: 6 × 15 cm RK L/22 (5.9 in) guns; 2 × 12 cm (4.7 in) guns

SMS Ariadne was a steam corvette of the German Kaiserliche Marine (Imperial Navy). She was the lead ship of the Ariadne class, which included two other ships, Luise and Freya. Ordered as part of a naval expansion program after the Austro-Prussian War, Ariadne was laid down in September 1868, launched in July 1871, and was commissioned in November 1872. Ariadne was a small vessel, armed with a battery of just eight guns.

Ariadne went on four major overseas cruises during her career. The first, from late 1874 to late 1876, saw the ship visit Chinese waters where she protected German shipping from pirate attacks. During the second, from late 1877 to late 1879, Ariadne operated off South America and the central Pacific Ocean. In 1880–1881, the ship went to South American waters to protect German interests during the War of the Pacific between Peru, Chile, and Bolivia, and in 1884–1885, she operated off West Africa, where she negotiated the acquisition of a protectorate in what is now Guinea.

After returning to Germany in 1885, Ariadne was reassigned as a training ship for apprentice seamen, a role she performed for the next five years. During this period, she went on training cruises to the Caribbean Sea, conducted training in the Baltic Sea, and participated in fleet exercises in German waters. She was decommissioned in September 1890, stricken from the naval register in April 1891, and sold to ship breakers in October.

== Design ==
The three Ariadne-class corvettes were ordered as part of the fleet plan of 1867, an expansion program aimed at strengthening the Prussian Navy in the wake of the Austro-Prussian War. The plan called for a total of twenty screw corvettes. The design for Ariadne was prepared in 1869.

Ariadne was 68.16 meters (223 ft 7 in) long overall, with a beam of 10.8 m (35 ft 5 in) and a draft of 4.8 m (15 ft 9 in) forward. She displaced 2,072 metric tons (2,039 long tons) at full load. The ship's crew consisted of 12 officers and 220 enlisted men. She was powered by a single marine steam engine that drove one 4-bladed screw propeller, with steam provided by four coal-fired fire-tube boilers, which gave her a top speed of 14.1 knots (26.1 km/h; 16.2 mph) at 2,260 metric horsepower (2,230 ihp). She had a cruising radius of 1,340 nautical miles (2,480 km; 1,540 mi) at a speed of 10 knots (19 km/h; 12 mph). As built, Ariadne was equipped with a full ship rig, but this was later reduced to a barque rig.

Ariadne was armed with a battery of six 15 cm (5.9 in) 22-caliber (cal.) breech-loading guns and two 12 cm (4.7 in) 23-cal. guns. In 1882, she had four 37 mm (1.5 in) Hotchkiss revolver cannon installed.

== Service history ==
=== Construction and early career in home waters ===
Ariadne was laid down in September 1868 at the Königliche Werft (Royal Shipyard) in Danzig. Work was delayed by the Franco-Prussian War and she was launched on 21 July 1871; during the launching ceremony, she was christened after the Greek goddess Ariadne by the shipyard director, Kapitän zur See (KzS—Captain at Sea) Franz Kinderling. She was commissioned into the fleet on 23 November 1872. She thereafter began sea trials, during which a number of defects were discovered that required repeated repairs. She was finally ready for service with the fleet by Spring of 1873.

On 15 April, Ariadne finally received her full crew to take her to Wilhelmshaven, where she joined the training squadron for training exercises. While in the outer Jade Bay, she and the other ships of the fleet were reviewed by a commission from the Reichstag on 23 May. She then visited Norway in company with the steam frigate Arcona. The training squadron was disbanded on 11 September, and on 13 October Ariadne was decommissioned at what was now the Kaiserliche Werft (Imperial Shipyard) in Danzig to have her rigging reduced.

Ariadne returned to service in 1874 and conducted trials to test her new rigging. On 6 June, she joined the training squadron, which at the time consisted of the ironclad warships Kronprinz and Friedrich Carl, the gunboat Albatross, and the aviso Grille, commanded by Konteradmiral (KAdm—Rear Admiral) Ludwig von Henk. The ships conducted maneuvers, shooting drills, sail training, and landing exercises. Later in the year, Ariadne accompanied Crown Prince Friedrich to Britain, which included a stop in Cowes on the island of Portland. After the ship returned to Germany, she stopped in Danzig Bay to rejoin the training squadron. She then went to Danzig and later Wilhelmshaven to prepare for an overseas deployment.

=== First overseas deployment ===
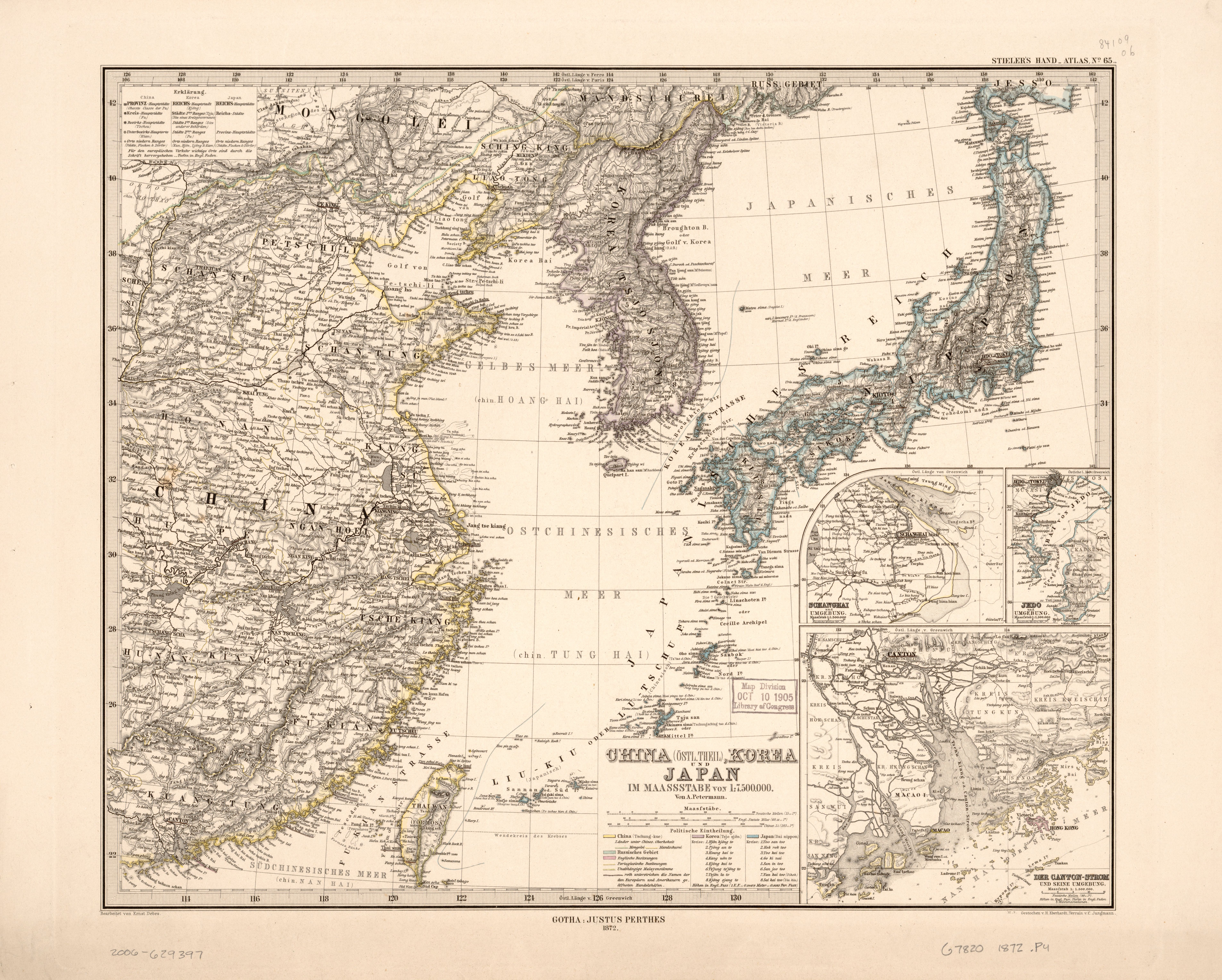
German 1872 map of China, Japan, and Korea

On 5 October, Ariadne left Wilhelmshaven to begin her cruise to East Asia. She transited the Suez Canal and arrived in Singapore on 24 December. She remained there until 4 January 1875, when she left for Manila in the Philippines, before proceeding on to Hong Kong, where she replaced the corvette Elisabeth as the station ship in China. At the time, Chinese pirates were a major problem and the Qing government refused to address the problem. European shipping companies therefore demanded that the fleets of their national governments intervene to stop the attacks. That year, the German government ordered the frigate Hertha and the gunboat Cyclop to join Ariadne.

The three ships patrolled off the coast between Canton and Taku before arriving at Whampoa on 12 September, where Ariadne and Cyclop launched a retaliatory raid against a group of pirates that had attacked the German schooner Anna. Ariadne conducted a hydrographic survey around Amoy in early 1876, and in April, the three ships in Chinese waters united in Hong Kong. They were joined by the frigate Vineta, whose captain, KzS Alexander von Monts, became the squadron commander. Later that year, on 1 July, Ariadne was replaced by her sister ship, Luise, allowing Ariadne to begin the voyage back to Germany on 17 July. She passed through the Suez Canal and arrived in Wilhelmshaven on 20 October; she was decommissioned there ten days later.

=== Second overseas deployment ===
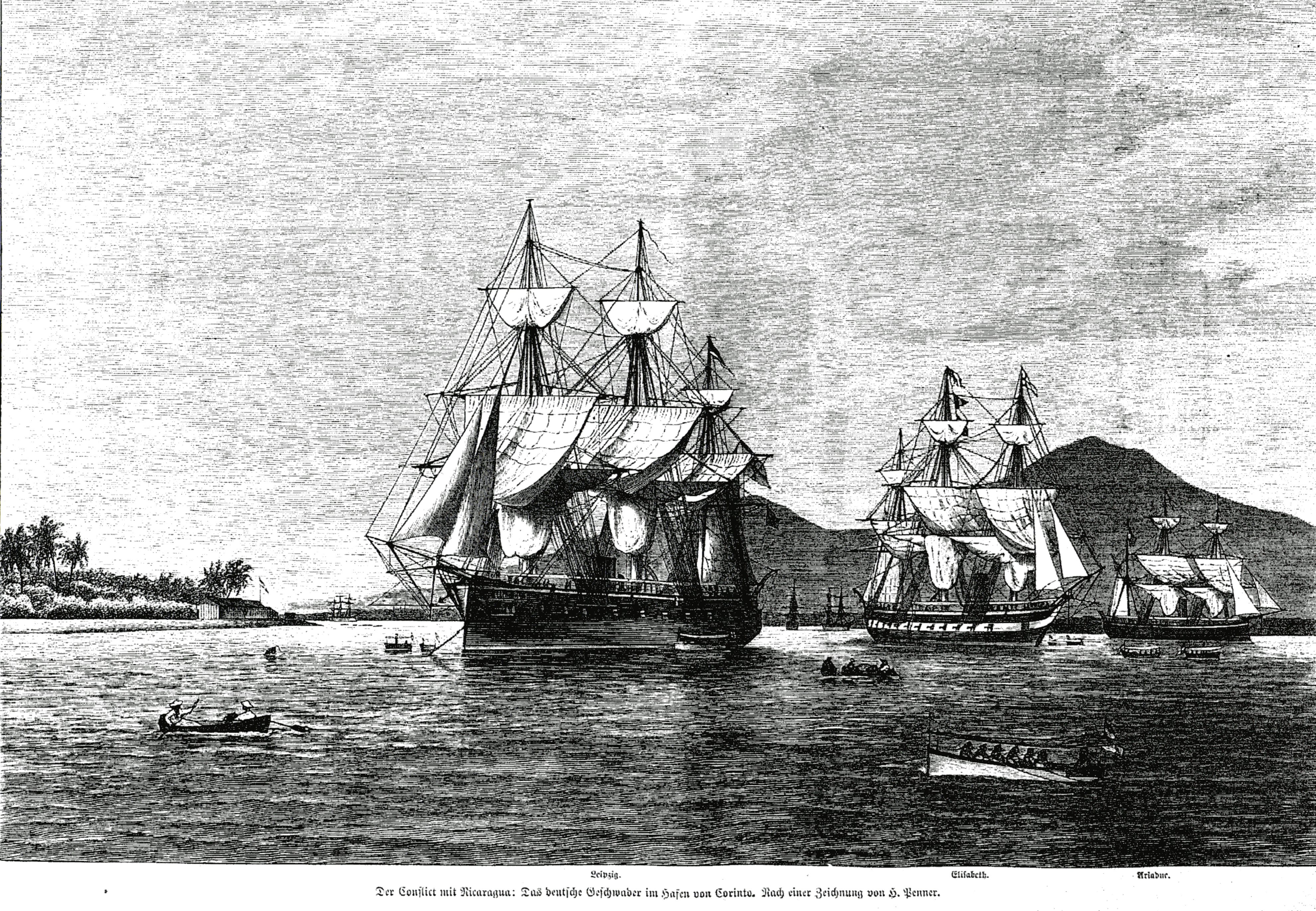
Illustration of the Central America Squadron, with Leipzig, Elisabeth, and Ariadne from left to right

Ariadne was given a thorough overhaul that lasted until late 1877; she was recommissioned on 15 October for another overseas cruise, this time to Central America and the central Pacific Ocean. She left Germany on 30 October, her departure having been delayed by heavy storms. Bad weather forced her to stop in Margate, Great Britain, to seek shelter. She was able to resume her voyage only on 16 December. Ariadne sailed to Funchal, Madeira and then proceeded to Rio de Janeiro, Brazil, where she arrived in January 1878. She then sailed to Punta Arenas, Chile, to replenish her coal, but on arrival her crew discovered that the local depot had no coal. The crew had to cut down trees to burn in the boilers instead.

Ariadne visited several islands in the Gulf of Penas before continuing on to Valparaíso, where she rendezvoused with the corvette Leipzig. The two ships sailed north to Panama, where they met Elisabeth; the three ships formed a squadron under the command of Elisabeth's captain, KzS Wilhelm von Wickede. They then sailed to Nicaragua, where the previous year a dispute with Germany had resulted in the German ambassador being attacked. Ariadne then sailed independently to Panama, where she received the order to leave South America and cross the Pacific. She sailed to the Galápagos Islands and then to the Marquesas Islands, where she visited the islands of Nuku Hiva and Fatu Hiva. Ariadne then sailed to Tahiti and visited the town of Papeete, where her commander, Korvettenkapitän (KK—Corvette Captain) Bartholomäus von Werner assured the local government that Germany had no intent of colonizing the islands.

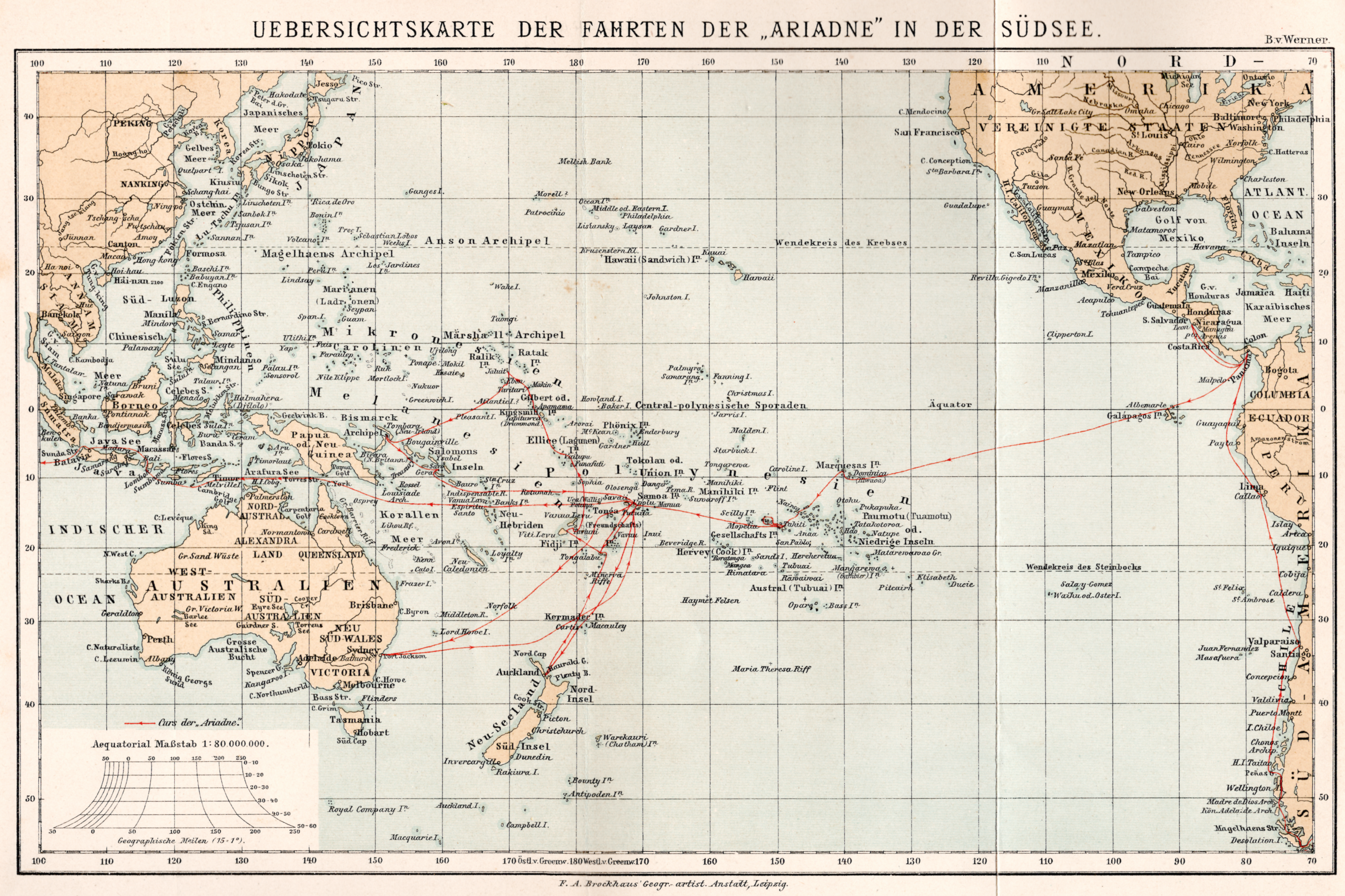
Map showing the travels of Ariadne during her second voyage overseas

Ariadne arrived in Apia, Samoa on 23 June. Under pressure from the United States, two Samoan chiefs had unilaterally repudiated the trade agreement they had signed with Germany. Ariadne was tasked with punishing the chiefs, and she sent men ashore to capture the towns of Saluafata and Falealili on the north coast of the island of Upolu. Ariadne left Samoa on 16 March to go to Sydney, Australia, where Werner informed Berlin of his activities. The ship also picked up the German consul Weber and, departing Sydney on 20 October, began a tour of the Melanesian and Micronesian islands. The ship visited Nukuʻalofa in the Tonga Islands from 26 to 29 October and Levuka and Tariani in the Fiji Islands from 30 October to 2 November. On 13 November, Ariadne called at Funafuti and Vaitupu Ellice Islands. Werner imposed trade and friendship treaties on the islanders giving Germany most-favored-nation treatment, and he intervened to assist the Handels-und Plantagen-Gesellschaft der Südsee-Inseln zu Hamburg (DHPG) trader at Vaitupu, Harry Nitz, in a dispute over land.

While visiting the Gilbert Islands, Ariadne had to conduct hydrographic surveys to correct the navigational charts of the area. In the Marshall Islands, Werner negotiated another trade and friendship agreement with the main island of Jaluit on 29 November. The treaty also allocated part of the port as a coaling station for German ships. On 11 December, Ariadne stopped in Mioko Island in what was to later become Neu Lauenberg; there was insufficient coal there, and so the crew again had to resort to cutting wood for the boilers. Weber asked Werner to continue the tour of the island of New Pomerania to show the flag and secure additional trade treaties. On 19–20 December, Werner concluded an agreement with the chief of Mioko Island to establish a coaling station there.

Ariadne began the voyage back to Samoa on 21 December, stopping briefly at Savo Island in the Solomon Islands before reaching Apia on 16 January 1879. There, the two Samoan chiefs had finally agreed to honor the agreement with Germany, and to allow the construction of a coaling station at Saluafata. On 25 January, Ariadne left for Auckland, New Zealand to cable Berlin and inform the government of the developments in Samoa. On arriving there on 4 February, Ariadne received the order to return to Germany once her replacement, the corvette Bismarck, arrived in Apia. Ariadne stopped in Nukualofa on the way to present the chief with a medal that had been awarded by Kaiser Wilhelm I. Bismarck reached Apia on 19 May, allowing Ariadne to leave on 28 May. She sailed through the New Hebrides, passed through the Torres Strait and the Arafura Sea, and stopped in Batavia. Ariadne transited the Suez Canal and steamed through the Mediterranean Sea, arriving in Wilhelmshaven on 30 September. She was decommissioned there on 12 October. In the course of her voyage, she had covered some 52,840 nautical miles (97,860 km; 60,810 mi).

=== Third deployment abroad ===
Over the winter of 1879–1880, Ariadne underwent a thorough overhaul at the Kaiserliche Werft in Wilhelmshaven, and on 1 April she was recommissioned for another deployment to South America. She left Germany on 14 April and arrived in Montevideo, Uruguay on 6 June, though unrest in Argentina prompted her to go to Buenos Aires to protect German interests. After the situation had calmed, she passed through the Strait of Magellan and arrived in Coronel on 11 August, where she replaced the ironclad corvette Hansa. Ariadne was then tasked with observing the Chilean and Peruvian ports during the War of the Pacific and to protect German interests.

In early January 1881, she took aboard sixty-four Germans at Ancón as a precaution against violence in the city. From 16 to 20 January, the ship sent a detachment of sailors ashore at Lima, Peru to help defend the Europeans in the city from plundering troops. On 14 July, Ariadne met the corvette Moltke that had been sent to replace her. Two days later, Ariadne left Valparaíso, steamed through the Strait of Magellan, and north through the Atlantic, arriving in Wilhelmshaven on 7 October. On the return voyage, she carried a banker from Frankfurt who had been charged with fraud and had escaped to South America, only to have been apprehended while Ariadne was on station. The ship transferred to Danzig later in the month and was decommissioned there on 31 October.

=== Fourth overseas deployment ===
In 1882, Ariadne had another major overhaul, but she remained in reserve until 15 July 1884, when she was reactivated. She was initially used as a training ship for engine and boiler room crews and four-year volunteers. She also participated in the autumn fleet maneuvers in late August with the corvette Sophie, the artillery school ship Mars, and a flotilla of torpedo boats. After the conclusion of the maneuvers, Ariadne received orders on 27 September to join a new West African Squadron, commanded by KAdm Eduard von Knorr to protect German interests in the region. The squadron also included the corvettes Bismarck, Gneisenau, Olga, and Sophie, along with the tender Adler. The ships left Wilhelmshaven on 30 October, bound for West Africa.

While in Cape Verde, Ariadne was detached from the squadron to proceed with Adler to Liberia to settle financial disputes. She then steamed off the coast of what was to become French Guinea; the chiefs in the territory between the Pongo and Dubreka rivers that had previously signed agreements with the German explorer Friedrich Colin in 1882 signed protectorate agreements with Ariadne's captain. The German government later traded these territories for areas on the border of Togoland. The ship then went to Freetown before proceeding on to Porto Grande, Cape Verde, where she remained from 15 January to 1 March 1885. While there, she received orders to return to Germany, which she reached on 30 March.

=== Later career ===
After arriving in Wilhelmshaven, Ariadne was reassigned to training duties for Schiffsjungen (apprentice seamen), though she was not formally reassigned as a training ship until 1888. In this role, she typically conducted training cruises in the Baltic and participated in the annual fleet maneuvers. She joined the newly-established Training Squadron on 29 September, which began a long training cruise to the Caribbean Sea on 10 October, which lasted until 27 March 1886 when the ships returned to Wilhelmshaven. She spent the next several months as she had in 1885, conducting training cruises in the Baltic and the autumn fleet exercises. On 14 October, she was decommissioned in Kiel.

Ariadne was recommissioned on 1 April 1887 to resume training duties in the Baltic. She was present for the ceremonial beginning of construction on the Kaiser Wilhelm Canal in Kiel in June, shortly before embarking on another cruise to the Caribbean on 12 June. During the voyage, she also visited ports in the United States. Ariadne arrived back in Wilhelmshaven on 25 August 1888 and immediately joined the fleet maneuvers, where she was tasked with defending the port with the ironclad König Wilhelm and some armored gunboats against a simulated attack. Ariadne was again decommissioned on 29 September and she remained out of service until 16 April 1889 for another cruise to the Caribbean.

After returning to Germany in 1890, she took part in a naval review held during a visit by a squadron of ironclads from the Austro-Hungarian Navy in August, which coincided with the annual fleet maneuvers, which Ariadne also joined. She decommissioned for the last time on 30 September. The ship was stricken from the naval register on 14 April 1891 and sold on 6 October; she was thereafter broken up in Hamburg.
