= Albrecht Pflaum =

German physician and aid worker (1947–1983)

Albrecht "Tonio" Pflaum (7 March 1947 – 30 April 1983) was a German doctor and development worker who was murdered in Nicaragua in 1983 during a Contra raid together with 13 Nicaraguans.

== Life and career ==
Pflaum was born in Baden-Württemberg and studied medicine in Freiburg im Breisgau. From 1980 he worked in Nicaragua for the Deutscher Entwicklungsdienst (DED). The country had been in civil war since the early 1980s, in which contra rebels associated with former dictator Anastasio Somoza Debayle and supported by the USA fought a guerrilla war against the socialist-oriented Sandinista government under Daniel Ortega, which in turn was supplied with economic, military, and intelligence support by the Eastern Bloc, particularly by Cuba and the German Democratic Republic.

On 30 April 1983, Pflaum was in the Jinotega-Esteli area with 13 locals on the way to a May Day celebration. According to initial press reports, the bus carrying 14 people was stopped by a Contra unit, the passengers were forced to disembark, and were immediately shot or stabbed to death with bayonets. The news of Pflaum's death reached the German Federal Foreign Office in Bonn that evening via the West German embassy in Managua. Pflaum left behind a wife and two children.

== Consequences ==
As a direct result of the assassination, the DED recalled its approximately 50 development workers working throughout Nicaragua to the capital Managua, where their safety could be guaranteed. Pflaum's body was brought to the Federal Republic a few days later.

On 2 May 1983, around 25 West German citizens who called themselves "internationalists" occupied the West German embassy in Managua and demanded from Ambassador Horst Heubaum, among other things, the appointment of an investigative commission "to investigate the murder of the German doctor and development worker Albrecht Pflaum without regard for 'allied' governments." Two women known to the embassy staff, who collected mail there, had succeeded in distracting the doorman and a guard from the Bundesgrenzschutz so that the occupiers could enter the embassy grounds.

The occupation ended peacefully after seven hours. The next day, this action was criticized by 70 representatives of the DED, the Friedrich Ebert Foundation and the Deutsche Gesellschaft für Technische Zusammenarbeit in a statement to the German government under Helmut Kohl, however the same statement also called on the government to rethink its existing policy towards Central America, especially since the policy of US President Ronald Reagan was the biggest disruptive factor in Central American affairs. Reagan himself, in turn, shortly afterwards described the Contras as "freedom fighters" and called for their open support.

On 4 May 1983, the Green Party MPs Petra Kelly and Gabriele Gottwald used the occasion of a government policy statement by Chancellor Kohl's government in the German Bundestag in Bonn as an opportunity to unfurl a banner reading "Mr. Kohl! Supporting the USA in Nicaragua means complicity in the death of Albrecht Pflaum." The banner was confiscated by ushers after Kelly and Gottwald refused to take it down.

It is not known whether criminal investigations into Pflaum's death were initiated in Germany or Nicaragua.

== Memorials ==
In 1983, the songwriter Walter Mossmann composed the piece "Unruhiges Requiem", in which he blamed US President Ronald Reagan and Chancellor Kohl for the death of Pflaum, whom he had apparently known personally. In 1987, the Freiburg Media Workshop produced the 45-minute documentary film Letters from Wiwili, in which reference is made to Pflaum. A memorial plaque was placed on Freiburg's Wiwilí Bridge in memory of Pflaum. In the Freiburg district of Rieselfeld, the Tonio-Pflaum-Weg is named after Pflaum.

== See also ==
- Yvan Leyvraz
- Ben Linder

== Literature ==
- Holly Sklar: Washington's War in Nicaragua. South End Press, Boston (Massachusetts) 1988, ISBN 0-89608-296-2, p. 357
- Nicaragua: Deutscher Arzt ermordet. Rechte Freischärler richten Gemetzel an. In: Nordwest-Zeitung, 2 May 1983, p. 1. (German)
- Invasion der Somoza-Anhänger. Nicaragua: Bonn-Kontroverse – Wischnewski-Reise. In Nordwest-Zeitung, 4 May 1983, p. 2. (German)
