= Friedrich von Hollmann =

Imperial German Navy officer

- Born: Friedrich Hollmann; 19 January 1842; Berlin, Germany
- Died: 21 January 1913 (aged 71); Berlin, Germany
- Military career
- Allegiance: Prussia; North German Confederation; German Empire
- Branch: Prussian Navy; North German Federal Navy; Imperial German Navy
- Service years: 1857–1897
- Rank: Admiral
- Commands: SMS Wolf; SMS Undine; SMS Medusa; SMS Elisabeth; SMS Württemberg; Chef des Schulgeschwaders; Chef des Übungsgeschwaders; Staatssekretär des Reichsmarineamts
- Other work: Chairman of AEG supervisory board

Friedrich von Hollmann (19 January 1842 – 21 January 1913) was an Admiral of the German Imperial Navy (Kaiserliche Marine) and Secretary of the German Imperial Naval Office under Emperor Wilhelm II.

== Naval career ==
Hollmann was born in Berlin, Germany. He entered the Prussian Navy in 1857 and made his first trip as a cadet aboard the sailing training ships SMS Amazone, Gefion and Thetis. In 1859–1862 he took part in the Eulenburg expedition to the Far East along with Karl Eduard Heusner, whom he would follow years later as Secretary of the German Imperial Naval Office.

In 1863 he was appointed to the Central Division (Zentralabteilung) of the Prussian Navy Department.

During the Second Schleswig War in 1864 he commanded the gunboat Wolf, and then (1864–1867) served as a Lieutenant aboard the cadet school ship Niobe. From 1867 to 1869 he was assigned to the Naval Academy Mürwik in Kiel.

In the Franco-Prussian War in 1870–1871, Hollmann was a Kapitänleutnant (Captain Lieutenant), then (1871–1873) served the expedition to North and South America aboard the screw frigate Gazelle. During this voyage, he led a landing party ashore in Port-au-Prince, Haiti, in a successful attempt to force the Haitian government to pay a debt owed to a German merchant.

Between 1874 and 1881, he returned to the Central Division of what was now the German Imperial Admiralty. During this period, he commanded the cadet ships Undine and Medusa from 1876 to 1878, and then captained the academy frigate Elisabeth of the Arcona class on its global tour from 1881 to 1883, the year the Krakatoa volcano erupted. On 20 May 1883 the German ship was stationed in the Sunda Strait, observing the ongoing eruption.

In 1886–1887, he was president of the Ship Examination Board (Schiffsprüfungskommission) and in the subsequent two years, Chief of Staff of the Admiralty. Now a konteradmiral (rear admiral), Hollmann commanded the squadron which accompanied the Kaiser and Kaiserin on their royal visit to Greece and Turkey from 1889 to 1890.

On 22 April 1890, Hollmann became a member of the Federal Council (Bundesrat}, the upper house of the Parliament and State Secretary of the German Imperial Naval Office (Reichsmarineamt) in the cabinet of Chancellor Leo von Caprivi, following the resignation of Karl Eduard Heusner. Here he planned naval construction and maintenance programs, directed the procurement of naval supplies, and represented the navy in the Reichstag. In the same year he was appointed vice admiral and in 1896, finally, admiral.

He was conservative in his attitude to war and especially horrified when he heard talk of war with Britain.

In the mid-1890s, the quest for a German naval base in the Far East was uppermost in the minds of the naval leaders of the German Empire. Many saw the First Sino-Japanese War (1894–1895) as an opportunity to act. For Hollmann, bases were "an absolute necessity for overseas naval operations." In the heated discussions as to where the base should be, he preferred Amoy on the Taiwan Strait. Nevertheless, when the Kaiser demanded that the navy take territory on the Shandong peninsula in September 1895, he demurred because of the uncertain reaction of Japan, Britain and Russia.

In the struggle over the Kaiser's naval expenditures, he admitted in February 1896 that "there are not 10 people in the Reichstag in favor of our great future fleet plans." He resigned in June 1897 because he could not prevail in getting the Kaiser's desired increases in the 1897 budget of the navy through the Reichstag. He promoted a navy of mainly cruisers as opposed to the heavy battle fleet sought by his successor, Alfred von Tirpitz.

== Later life ==
Hollmann was appointed a member of the Prussian House of Lords in 1904. In 1906 he became the President of the Institute for Testing of Aerodynamic Models of the Powered Airship Society (Motorluftschiff-Studiengesellschaft) and its successor company, the Luft-Fahrzeug-Gesellschaft, which dealt with the construction, development and distribution of airships, including for the navy.

On 27 January 1905, he was appointed to the Order of the Black Eagle.

He was one of the founders of the German Fleet Association (Deutsche Flottenverein).

After leaving the navy, Hollmann was a member of the supervisory board of the Allgemeine Elektrizitäts-Gesellschaft, and later its chairman. He died in Berlin.

== See also ==
- Eisenstück affair
