= Corinto, Nicaragua =

Corinto
- Municipality and town
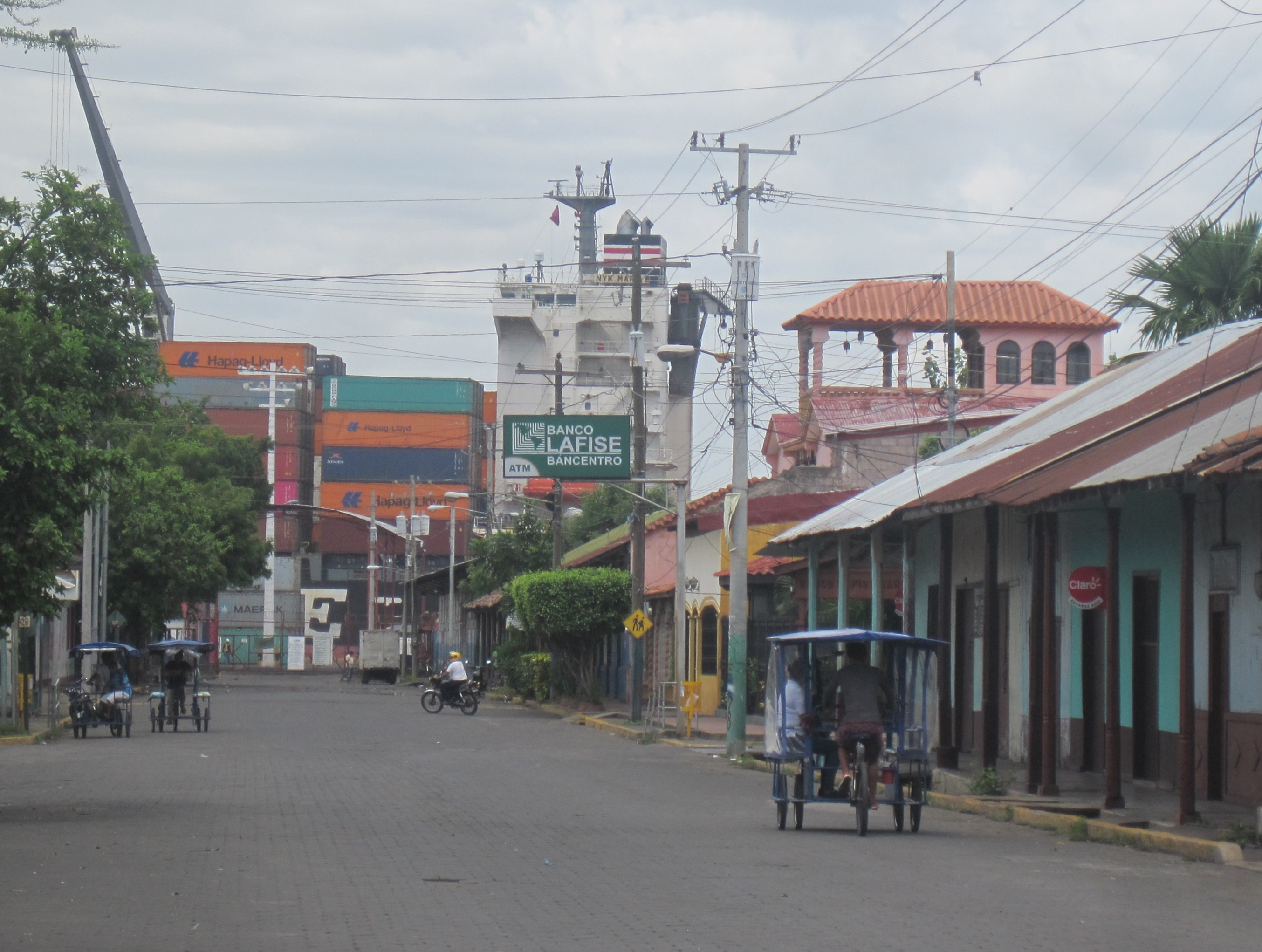
- Corinto, Nicaragua

- Location in Nicaragua
- Coordinates: 12°29′N 87°11′W
- Country: Nicaragua
- Department: Department of Chinandega
- Founded: 1858

Area
  - Municipality and town: 27.3 sq mi (70.7 km^{2})

Population (2022 estimate)
  - Municipality and town: 18,602
  - Density: 681/sq mi (263/km^{2})
  - Urban: 18,602
- Time zone: UTC-6 (Central Time)
- Isla El Cardón Lighthouse
- Coordinates: 12°28′32.8″N 87°11′25.6″W
- Constructed: 1876
- Foundation: concrete base
- Construction: concrete tower
- Height: 13 metres (43 ft)
- Shape: cylindrical tower with balcony and light atop a 1-storey hexagonal prism basement
- Markings: white tower
- Power source: solar power
- Operator: Aquatic Transport Directorate
- Focal height: 27 metres (89 ft)
- Range: 10 nautical miles (19 km; 12 mi)
- Characteristic: L Fl W 10s.

Corinto is a town, with a population of 18,602 (2022 estimate), on the northwest Pacific coast of Nicaragua in the province of Chinandega. The municipality was founded in 1863.

== History ==
=== Early years ===
The town of Corinto was founded in 1849. It first came into prominence as a port in 1863, due to its spacious and sheltered harbour. It superseded El Realejo, which was from 1550 to 1850 the principal seaport of Nicaragua but became partly filled with sandbanks.

=== British occupation ===
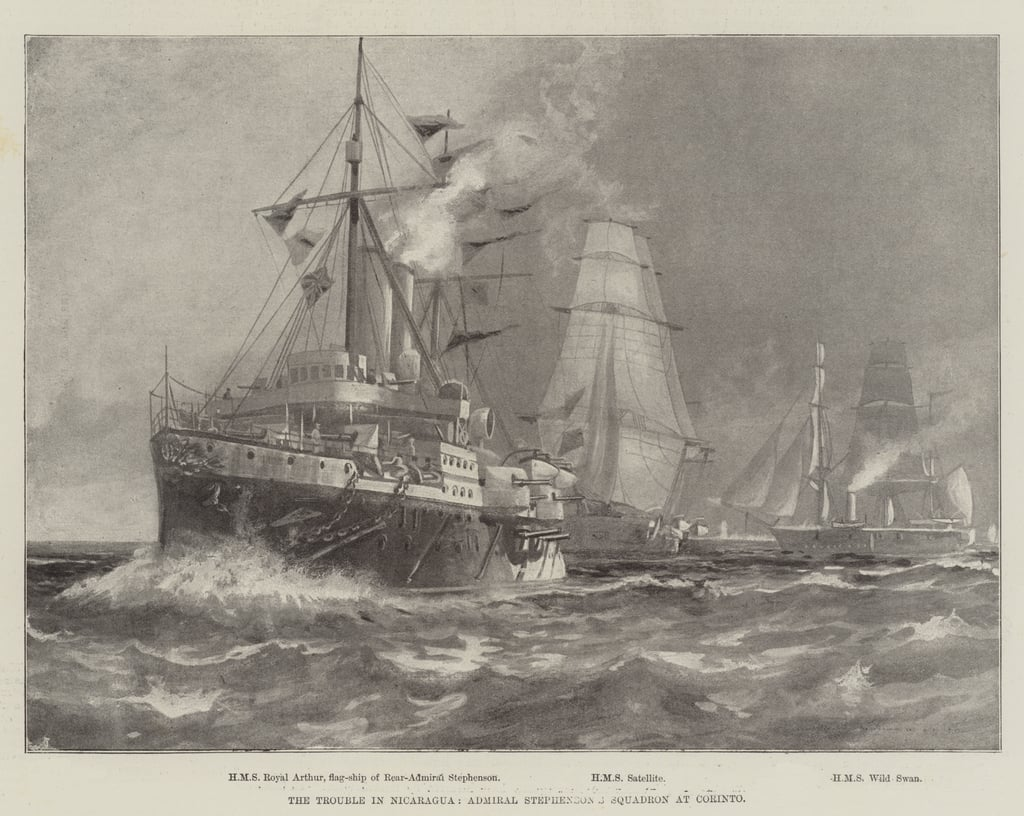
The Trouble in Nicaragua, Admiral Stephenson's Squadron at Corinto. Illustration for The Illustrated London News, 4 May 1895.

When Nicaragua refused to pay Britain an indemnity for the annexation of the Mosquito Reserve, the British responded by occupying the Nicaraguan Pacific port of Corinto on 27 April 1895. Eventually the British left after being paid indemnities by the Nicaraguan government.

=== United States intervention ===
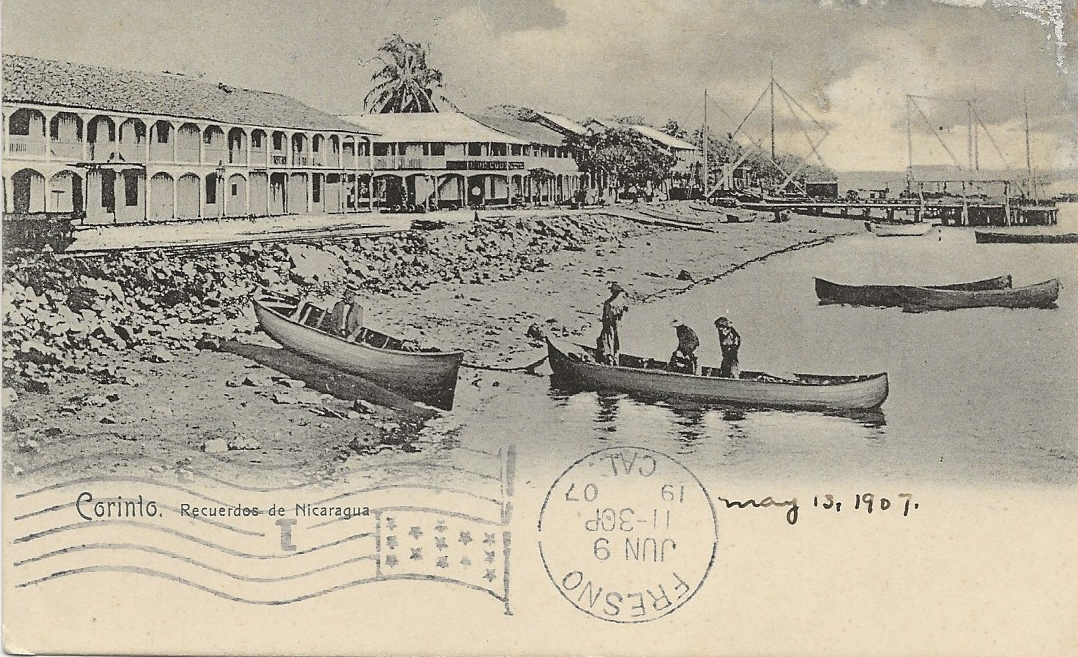
Post card sent on May 13, 1907, from Corinto, Nicaragua to the United States.

On May 2, 1896, U.S. Marines landed in Corinto to protect American interests during political unrest.

In 1909, President Theodore Roosevelt appointed the African-American writer James Weldon Johnson U.S. Consul to Corinto.

On January 25, 1922, the USS Galveston landed a detachment of U.S. Marines at Corinto, to reinforce the Managua legation guard during a period of political tension.

=== Nicaraguan Revolution ===
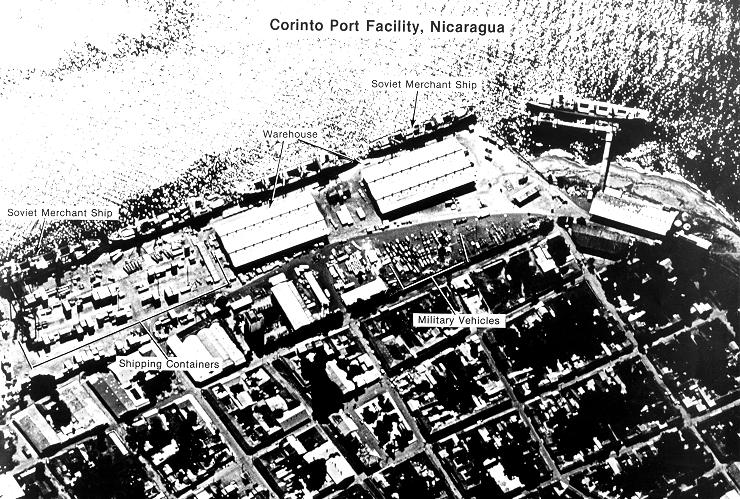
Port of Corinto in 1981 (CIA)

While supporting the Contra war against the Sandinista government in the 1980s, U.S. Forces mined the Port of Corinto. On October 10, 1983, an attack destroyed 3.2 million US gallons (12,000 m^{3}) of fuel. It is believed that this attack was directed by the CIA and carried out by U.S. Navy Seals.

== Economy ==
Corinto was a railroad terminus and is Nicaragua's largest and only Pacific port for the import and export of goods. It has a container terminal and is able to manage a wide variety of cargo: liquid, bulk, containers, cars, etc.

== International relations ==
=== Twin towns – Sister cities ===
Corinto is twinned with:

- Erftstadt, Germany
- Kalisz, Poland
- Les Sables-d'Olonne, France
- Lörrach, Germany
- Mersin, Turkey
- Nuseirat, Gaza Strip, Palestine
- Piotrków Trybunalski, Poland
- Tarnobrzeg, Poland
- Tuscaloosa, United States
- Vénissieux, France

== See also ==
- Eisenstück affair
- List of lighthouses in Nicaragua
