= 15 cm RK L/22 =

1860s coastal artillery gun by Krupp

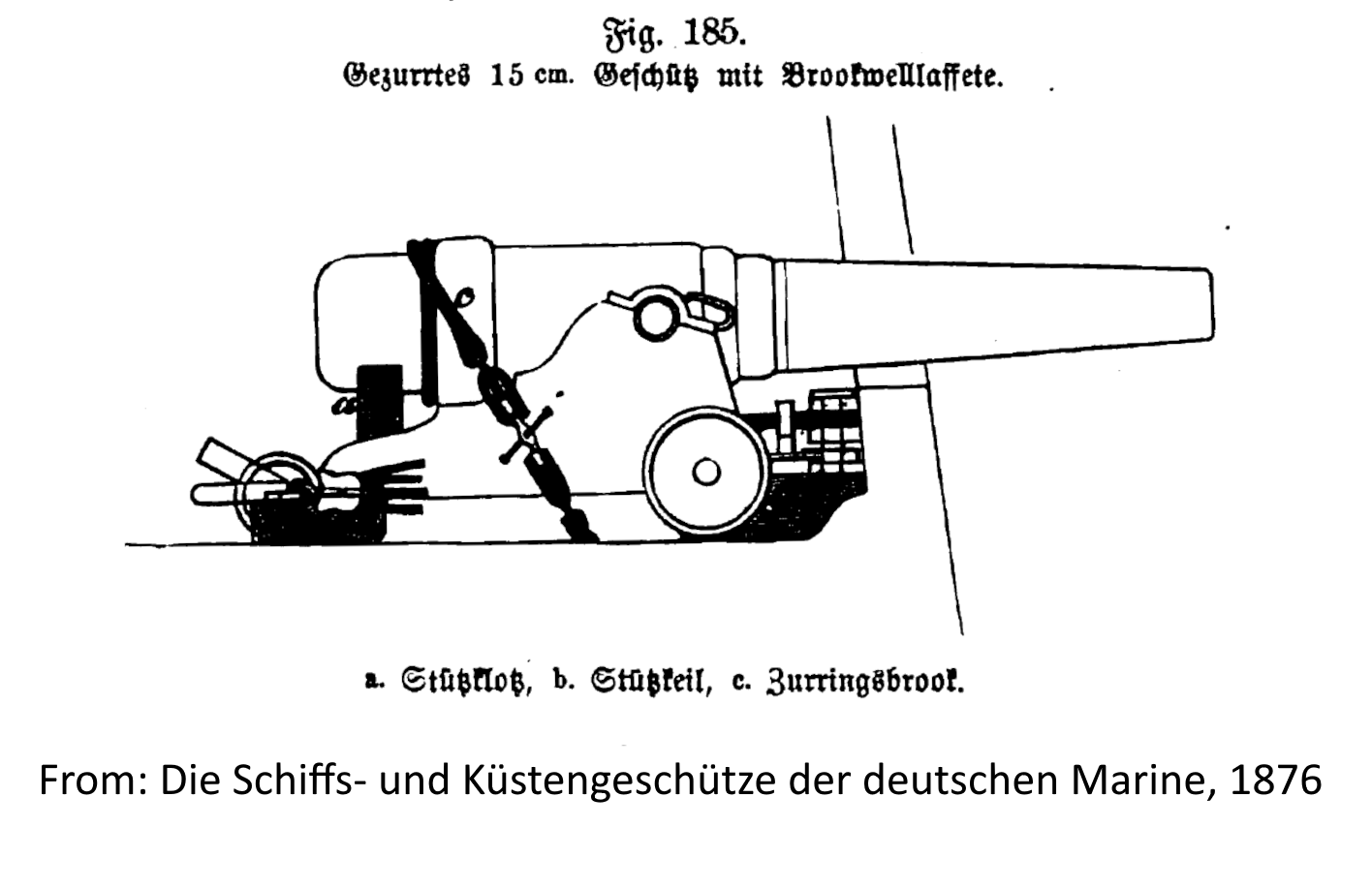
- Fixated 15 cm RK L/22 on brookwell carriage
- Type: Naval artillery Coastal artillery
- Place of origin: German Empire

Service history
- Used by: Germany Ottoman Empire

Production history
- Designer: Krupp
- Manufacturer: Krupp

Specifications
- Mass: 3,500 kg
- Length: 3,270 mm (L/22)
- Caliber: 149.1 mm
- Muzzle velocity: 477 m/s
- Effective firing range: armor: 2,000 m soft targets: 5,000 m

The 15 cm Ring Kanone L/22 or Kurze 15 cm Ring Kanone was a 15 cm 22 caliber long Krupp Ring Kanone (RK). It was a rifled breech loader built-up gun with a Krupp cylindroprismatic sliding breech. It was designed based on the idea that for penetrating armor, it was more effective to increase the charge than to increase the caliber. There were two models: The original model with 24 wedge grooves and the later model with 36 parallel grooves.

== Context ==
=== Increasing the charge ===
The early 1860s saw an arms race between guns and armor, which led to a steady increase in the caliber of guns. In 1867, the Prussian Artillerie Prüfungskommission (Artillery Test Commission) then got the idea that instead of constantly increasing the caliber of guns, it might be more efficient to increase the charge. The commission made some proposals which were not approved.

=== The Aptirte 15 cm Marine Kanone ===
Meanwhile, the Prussian Navy had a 15 cm gun with double wedge breech and a weight of 60 Zentners (3,000 kg) changed for increased charge. This was called the 'Aptirte 15 cm Marine Kanone'. In detail, it was a massive cast steel breechloader of 3050 kg including the double wedge breech block. The length of bore was 2,084 mm. There were 24 grooves with a twist length of 63.2 calibers or 9.42 m.

This gun was tested in Fall 1868. The results were surprising. This 15 cm proved able to penetrate 127 mm of armor at 150 m. The Artillery Test Commission then made its proposal that led to the 15 cm RK L/26.

== The 15 cm Ring Kanone L/22 c/69 ==
=== The original 15 cm RK L/22 c/69 ===
When the Artillery Test Commission made its proposal in November 1868, Krupp had already made some short 15 cm Ring Kanonen for the Navy. These were only 3,270 mm long and had 30 wedge grooves with a twist length of 68 calibers. The gun used a charge of 6 kg. At the time these were called kurzer Ring 24pfdr. c/69 125" (70Ztr. schwer). This meant: caliber 15 cm, constructed in 1869, 3.270 m long and weighing 3,500 kg.

In August 1871, the kurzer Ring 24pfdr. c/69 125" (70Ztr. schwer) would become the kurze 15 cm Marine Ring Kanone. In 1885 it and the later model became the 15 cm Ring Kanone L/22. Another early name for the gun was 'kurzes 15 cm Marine-Ring' (Rohr).

In late 1869, The Artillery Test Commission determined that the kurze 15 cm Marine Ring Kanone would use the standard grenade Langgranate of the army's short 15 cm siege gun. All the guns designed in 1869 (c/69) had driving bands of thin soft lead. This sufficed up to a velocity of 420 m/s and a faster rotation than used in the contemporary field and fortification artillery.

In Winter 1869/70 the short 15 cm navy gun was tested. It fired projectiles with a velocity of 441 m/s, and was very inaccurate. The projectiles that had been fired showed damage to the driving bands. These tests were stopped by the Franco-Prussian War. In 1870 most of the guns that were under test were sent to Wilhelmshafen.

Later in 1871, the tests with the short 15 cm navy gun were resumed. In Winter 1871/2, the 15 cm RK L/26 joined these tests. The results were disappointing. The Artillery Test Commission then proposed to use hard lead like the new army artillery did. The navy proposed copper driving bands.

=== Experiments ===
In 1868, Krupp's Ring Kanone system had proven itself superior over the British rifled muzzleloaders. However, the British manufacturers then improved the performance of their guns by introducing pebble gunpowder. In order to stay ahead, Krupp wanted to find the best combination of the kind of gunpowder to use, the kind of grooves and twist length of the gun, and the kind of driving bands on the projectiles. These matters were intertwined.

In early 1872 the navy then wrote to the Artillery Test Commission that it wanted to go along with some Krupp proposals. The 15 cm gun would be the best option to test rifling choices and driving bands.

Meanwhile, the German admiralty wanted to use a very long grenade for its 15 and 17 cm guns. The idea, which was also supported by the British and French navies, was that such grenades could easily penetrate wooden ships by having an increased punch per cm^{2} and less loss of velocity at longer distances. This required a stronger twist (smaller twist length), which indicated the use of copper driving bands.

These test started in August 1872 and were done with long 15 cm guns. In March 1873, the army then approved hard lead driving bands for its 15 cm guns. In Fall 1873, it determined that the best groove configuration for this were 24 wedge grooves with a constant twist length of 50 calibers. In Summer 1874, the admiralty decided on wedge grooves, a 45 caliber constant twist length and three caliber long grenades with copper driving bands for its long 15 cm guns.

=== The aptirte 15 cm RK L/22 ===
As the c/69 design was a very early design, the part of the chamber where the projectile was placed was not rifled. In Winter 1875/76 it became clear that extending the rifling to this part of the gun was advantageous. For existing guns, this led to the 'aptirtes kurzes 15 cm Marine-Ring'.

In Fall 1876 one of the c/69 navy guns with 68 caliber twist length and 30 wedge grooves was changed. The part of the chamber were the projectile was placed was rifled, the chamber was changed to use 8 kg of gunpowder, and the gun would use 2.5 caliber long grenades with copper driving bands. The long grenade was fired with a velocity of 480 m/s, the chilled iron one with 460 m/s.

After some tests, the admiralty then decided to change all its 160 short 15 cm Ring Kanonen and 15 cm Mantel Kanonen in this way, and use the c/76 ammunition with copper driving bands. Later tests were not that positive. However, the navy also had 33 short 15 cm Ring Kanone with a twist length of 50 caliber. On such a gun, the change led to a very high accuracy with a charge of 7.75 kg.

The navy then decided to immediately change all its 33 short 15 cm guns with a 50 caliber twist length in this manner. The short 15 cm Ring Kanone with a 68 caliber twist length would get a new inner barrel for a twist length of 50 calibers and a charge of 7.75 kg. This new inner barrel used 36 parallel grooves.

The aptirte 15 cm RK L/22 used c/76 grenades. For these grenades, the ballistic tables were made in 1877/8. The chilled iron grenade for use against armor weighed 33.67 kg. It was fired with a charge of 7.75 kg, attaining a velocity of 449 m/s. The effective range was 2,000 m. The regular long grenade weighed 29.5 kg. It was fired with a charge of 7.75 kg, attaining a velocity of 477 m/s. The effective range was 5,000 m.

=== The late 15 cm RK L/22 ===
Von Müller's standard work on the early Krupp naval guns, also had a 'Kurze 15 cm Ring'. In dmienstions, this was almost identical to the c/69 gun. With regard to grooves and twist length its 36 parallel grooves made it even more similar to the aptirte 15 cm RK L/22 c/69. It had the comment 'Bei neubeschaffungen' i.e. for new orders.

It is not that clear whether this gun was actually put in production. When the first 15 cm Mantel Ring Kanone had been ordered in Summer 1877, it was to have similar characteristics as the aptirte 15 cm RK L/22, but to attain these with a charge of only 6.5 kg. This succeeded so well that the new MRK could even use the same ballistic table. This seems to indicate that there were not many 'late 15 cm RK L/22' made.

=== The army 15 cm Ring Kanone C/72 ===
The German army used the long 15 cm RK L/26 for coastal defense, and the shorter 15 cm Ring Kanone C/72 of 23 calibers as siege artillery. The latter was only one caliber longer than our 15 cm RK L/22. One might therefore think that the army would follow the navy, and would also designate its shorter 15 cm Ring Kanone as such. However, in the context of the army, a short gun was much shorter than our 15 cm RK L/22. Therefore, the 15 cm Ring Kanone C/72 was labelled 15 cm Ringkanone.

== Characteristics ==
=== The gun barrel ===
All models of the 15 cm RK L/22 had a 3,270 mm long barrel of 149.1 mm caliber that weighed 3,500 kg.

There were differences between the early model, the changed model and the (supposed) late model with regard to the inner configuration of the gun. In general the early models had wedge grooves, a 6 kg charge and a 68 caliber twist length. Later models had 36 parallel grooves, a charge of 7.75 kg and a twist of only 50 calibers. Many of the early models were changed to this configuration.

The changes to the gun took quite some time, or were not done to all the guns. In 1885, the German Navy discerned a 15 cm RK L/22 and a 15 cm RK L/22 mit Bleiführung, indicating that some of the guns still had the old grooves meant for lead driving bands.

=== Carriages ===
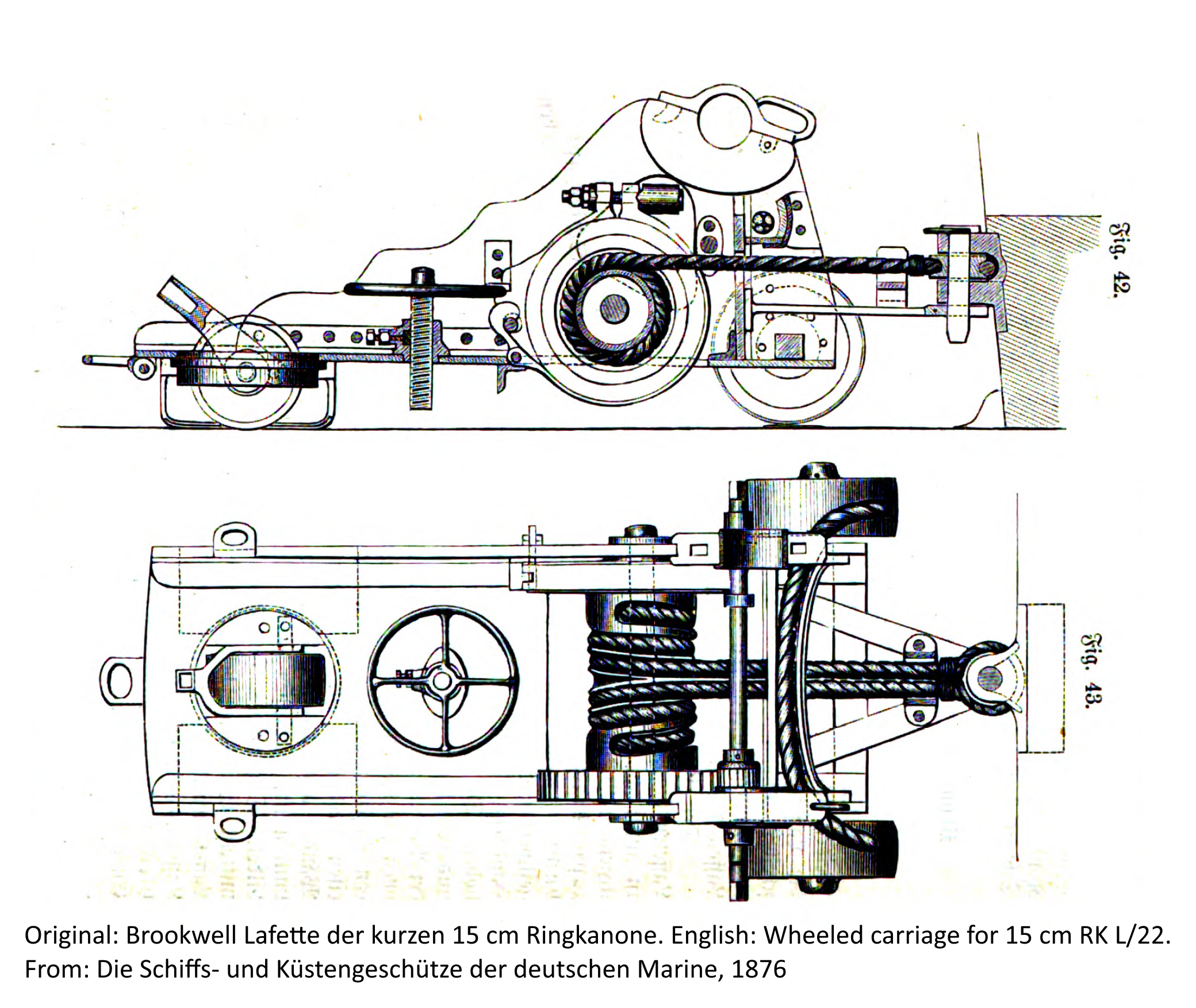
Wheeled carriage for 15 cm RK L/22 with Brookwell brake

In the German navy, there were two kinds of carriages, the wheeled carriages (Radlafette) and the sliding carriages (Rahmenlafette). The difference is that on the wheeled carriage, the recoil causes the gun to move backwards on its wheels. On the sliding carriage, the upper part of the carriage moves, while the lower part of the carriage stays in place. The 15 cm gun of 70 Zentner (3,500 kg) was the heaviest gun that could be used on a wheeled carriage.

The recoil of wheeled carriages could be stopped by a rope Brooktau or by a brake called a Brookwell brake. The latter was used on the wheeled carriages for 12 cm Ring Kanonen and 15 cm Mantel Kanonen and 15 cm Ring Kanonen. The Brookwell brake consisted of a cylinder with a rope that was attached to the ship's hull. When the gun was fired, the rope rolled off the cylinder with high resistance, thus dampening the recoil.

There is an elaborate description of the Brookwell carriage for the 15 cm RK L/22. It weighed 1,440 kg and had a firing height of 890 mm.

In 1885, there was carriage known as 15 cm Rad-Lafette in the German navy, but this was used for the 15 cm MRK L/22. The 15 cm RK L/22 were on all shifting carriages.

There were multiple sliding carriages for the 15 cm RK L/22. The Rahmenlafette c/68 der kz. 15 cm RK für eine Pforte weighed 2,005 kg and had a firing height of 855 mm. The Rahmenlafette c/68 der kz. 15 cm RK für Pfortenwechsel weighed 2,035 kg and also had a firing height of 855 mm.

=== Projectiles ===
In 1885, the German Navy had these projectiles for the 15 cm RK L/22:

- 15 cm Granate L/2,5 (C/76) shot with 7.75 kg of P.P. C/68
- 15 cm Hartgussgranate c/69 aptirt shot with 7.75 kg of P.P. C/68
- 15 cm Hartgussgranate L/2,5 (C/76) shot with 7.75 kg of P.P. C/68

For those guns that still used lead driving bands these were:

- 15 cm Granate shot with 5.5 kg of P.P. C/68 used for practice
- 15 cm Granate C/69 shot with 5.5 kg of P.P. C/68
- 15 cm Vollgeschoss shot with 6 kg of P.P. C/68 used for practice
- 15 cm Hartgussgranate c/69 shot with 6 kg of P.P. C/68
- 15 cm Kartätsche shot with 2 kg of gunpowder

== Use ==
The 15 cm RK L/22 gun was used as main armament on the smaller vessels of the German Navy. I.e. wooden screw corvettes, avisos and gunboats. At the time that the 15 cm RK L/22 gun was made, guns of this size could still be repurposed with relative ease. See the example below, where some 1879 gunboats got 15 cm Mantel Kanone, which were refurbished 1864 massive steel guns.

The Arcona-class frigates (Arcona, Gazelle, Vineta, Hertha, and Elisabeth) was originally armed with smoothbore muzzleloaders. Some say that it was later re-armed with 19 'short' 15 cm guns. Others say that the corvettes Alexandrine and Arcona each got 10 15 cm L/30 Kanone. Vineta did not have the 15 cm RK L/22, as in 1879 she got 17 15 cm Mantel Ring Kanonen.

The Ariadne-class corvettes had the gun as main armament. Ariadne and Luise each had six 15 cm RK L/22 guns. Four of these were placed on Rahmen-Lafetten für Pfortenwechsel. Freya had eight 15 cm RK L/22 guns, of which four on Rahmen-Lafetten für Pfortenwechsel. There were probably also other German corvettes that had the gun as main armament.

The Albatross class gunboats Albatross and Nautilus each had two 15 cm Ring Kanone on Rahmen-Lafetten für Pfortenwechsel.

The iron gunboats / avisos Habicht and Möwe were launched in 1879. They each had a 15 cm Mantel Kanone on a Rahmen-Lafetten für Pfortenwechsel (not a RK) and four 12 cm RK on a Halbrahmen-Lafette.

== Further development ==
In 1875, Krupp made its first Mantel Ring Kanone. This was basically a Ring Kanone which also had a thin pre-pressured inner tube, making a stronger barrel. At the time, the trend was for guns to become longer. However, for use as broadside guns on smaller vessels, this was not feasible. In Summer 1877, a short 15 cm Mantel Ring Kanone was ordered. This would become the 15 cm MRK L/22.
