= Albatross-class gunboat =

Class of German gunboats

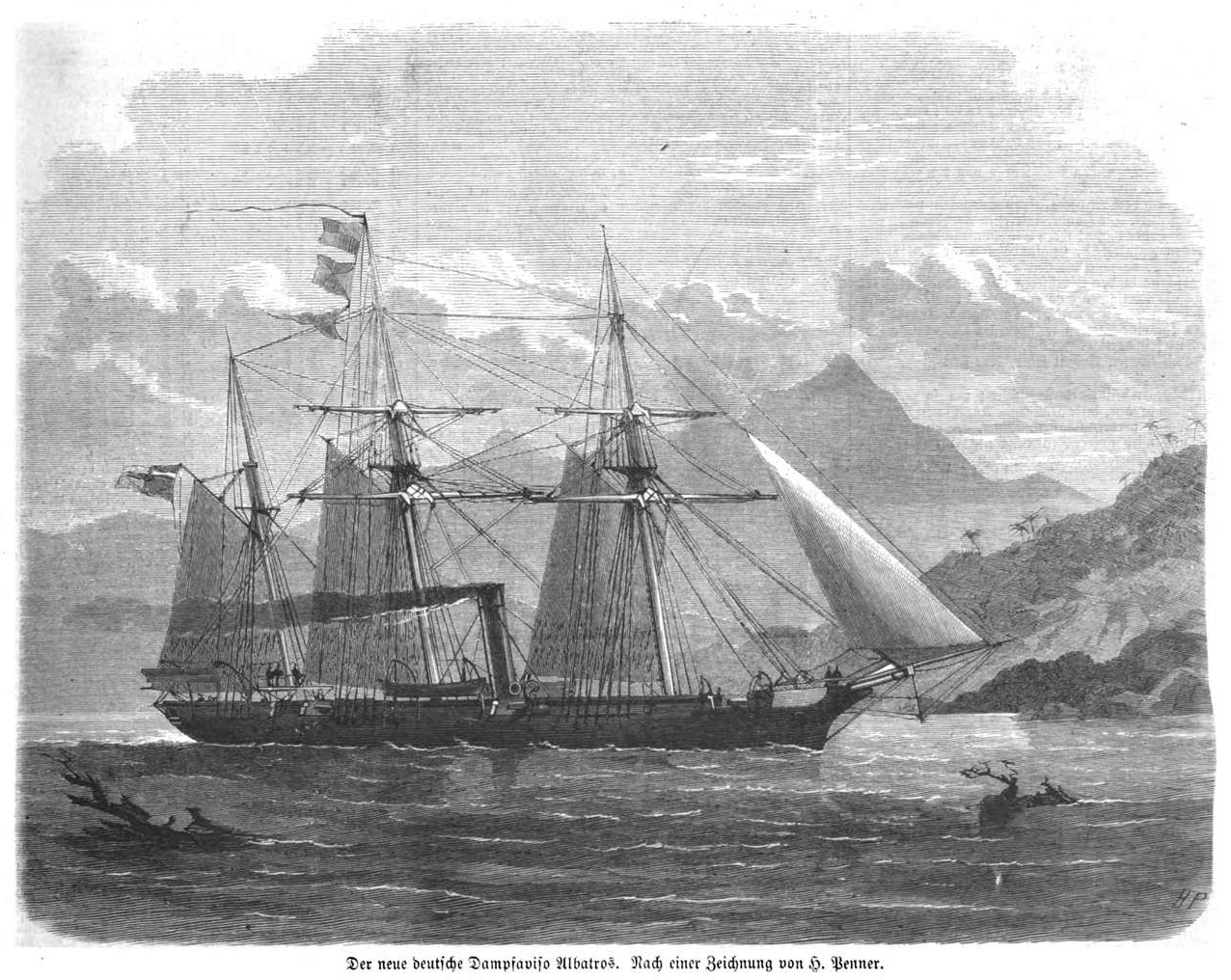
- Etching of SMS Albatross by H.Penner

Class overview
- Preceded by: Camäleon class
- Succeeded by: Wespe class
- Built: 1869–1873
- Planned: 2
- Completed: 2
- Lost: 1
- Scrapped: 1

General characteristics
- Type: Steam gunboat
- Displacement: Design: 713 t (702 long tons; 786 short tons); Full load: 786 t (774 long tons; 866 short tons)
- Length: 56.95 m (186 ft 10 in) o/a
- Beam: 8.32 m (27 ft 4 in)
- Draft: 3.75 m (12 ft 4 in)
- Installed power: 2 × fire-tube boilers; 491 metric horsepower (484 ihp)
- Propulsion: 2 × marine steam engines; 1 × screw propeller
- Speed: 10.5 knots (19.4 km/h; 12.1 mph)
- Range: 1,270 nautical miles (2,350 km; 1,460 mi) at 10 knots (19 km/h; 12 mph)
- Complement: 5 officers; 98 enlisted men
- Armament: 2 × 15 cm (5.9 in) K L/22 built-up guns; 2 × 12 cm (4.7 in) K L/23 built-up guns

The Albatross class of steam gunboats comprised two ships: SMS Albatross and Nautilus. They were ordered by the North German Federal Navy, but by the time they had entered service in the early 1870s, the German lands had unified into the German Empire, and so they commissioned into Kaiserliche Marine (Imperial Navy) in the early 1870s. The ships were ordered as part of a construction program intended to begin replacing the old Jäger-class gunboats that had been built a decade earlier. Unlike the older ships, Albatross and Nautilus were intended to serve abroad to protect German economic interests overseas. The ships were armed with a battery of four guns, and had a top speed of 10 to 10.5 knots (18.5 to 19.4 km/h; 11.5 to 12.1 mph).

The two ships spent the majority of their careers overseas, including a cruise to South America in the early 1870s for Albatross. Both ships patrolled the coast of Spain during the Third Carlist War in 1874–1875 to protect German nationals in the country. The two ships were sent to the Pacific Ocean in the latter half of the decade to defend German economic interests in China and the South Pacific. They each made another lengthy cruise in the Pacific for much of the 1880s, and were involved in German colonial activities in the South Pacific. After returning home in 1888, both vessels were converted into survey ships and used in home waters. Nautilus was eventually sold for scrap in 1905, and Albatross became a coal barge that year, before being wrecked in a storm in 1906.

== Design ==
In the late 1850s and early 1860s, the Prussian Navy had embarked on a construction program that included the fifteen Jäger-class gunboats and eight Camäleon-class gunboats. By 1869, the navy realized that the earliest vessels, starting with the badly rotted Crocodill, would need to be replaced. Design work started for the new class, which were intended for overseas cruising, instead of coastal defense as the earlier vessels had been. One of the primary missions for the new ships was as pirate hunters in Chinese waters. Piracy was a major problem in the region, particularly as Prussian commercial interests expanded in the market in China in the 1860s.

=== Characteristics ===
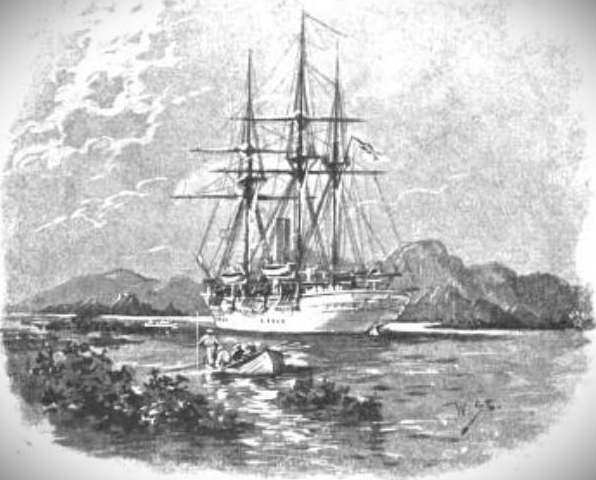
Albatross in the South Pacific

The ships of the Albatross class were 51.21 meters (168 ft) long at the waterline and 56.95 m (186 ft 10 in) long overall. They had a beam of 8.32 m (27 ft 4 in) and a draft of 3.62 m (11 ft 11 in) forward, which increased slightly to 3.75 m (12.3 ft) aft. They displaced 713 metric tons (702 long tons) normally and 786 t (774 long tons) at full load. Their hulls were wood-built using carvel construction, and they had a transom stern. They were copper sheathed to protect the wood from marine biofouling on extended cruises abroad.

The ships' crew consisted of 5 officers and 98 enlisted men. They carried four small boats of unrecorded type. The ships lost significant speed in a head sea, but were otherwise quite seaworthy. Steering was controlled via a single rudder; they steered well, but their maneuverability was moderate. They also operated well under sail.

They were powered by a pair of horizontal, single-cylinder marine steam engines that drove one 2-bladed screw propeller, which could be retracted while the ships cruised under sail. Steam was provided by two coal-fired fire-tube boilers, which were vented through a single funnel located amidships. The machinery was divided between a single engine room and a boiler room. The propulsion system was rated to give them a top speed of 10.9 knots (20.2 km/h; 12.5 mph) at 601 metric horsepower (593 ihp), but neither vessel reached those figures in service. Albatross was slightly faster of the pair, making 10.5 knots (19.4 km/h; 12.1 mph) from 491 PS (484 ihp), compared to Nautilus, which only managed 10 knots (19 km/h; 12 mph) from 496 PS (489 ihp). As built, they were equipped with a three-masted barque rig with a total sail area of 710 m^{2} (7,600 sq ft). Later in their careers, this was reduced to a schooner rig with a total area of 415 to 471 m^{2} (4,470 to 5,070 sq ft).

The ships were armed with a battery of two 15 cm (5.9 in) K L/22 built-up guns and two 12 cm (4.7 in) K L/23 built-up guns. The 15 cm guns were supplied with a total of 140 shells, and they had a maximum range of 4,600 m (15,100 ft). The 12 cm guns could engage targets out to 5,500 m (18,000 ft), and they were supplied with 180 shells. Both vessels later had three 37 mm (1.5 in) Hotchkiss revolver cannon added before eventually being disarmed.

== Ships ==
Albatross sometime in the 1880s

Construction data
| Ship | Builder | Laid down | Launched | Commissioned |
|---|---|---|---|---|
| Albatross | Königlich Werft, Danzig | 1869 | 11 March 1871 | 23 December 1871 |
| Nautilus | Königlich Werft, Danzig | 1870 | 31 August 1871 | 4 June 1873 |

== Service history ==
Albatross and Nautilus spent the majority of their careers overseas, beginning with a deployment for Albatross to South America from 1872 to 1874. After a brief period of time in home waters in 1874, Albatross sailed to join Nautilus off the coast of Spain to protect German nationals there during the Third Carlist War, patrolling the coast there into 1875. Nautilus's captain was involved in settling a dispute between the Carlists and a German merchant ship captain whose vessel was attacked by Carlist forces. During their time off Spain, the ships occasionally traded fire with Carlist forces, but otherwise were not heavily engaged. Nautilus thereafter sailed to the Pacific for a tour from 1876 to 1878 that saw the ship operate primarily off the coast of China. From 1877 to 1880, Albatross was sent to cruise in the Pacific Ocean, but on the way, she was temporarily diverted to protect Germans in the Ottoman Empire. After she arrived in the Pacific, she patrolled Chinese waters as well as the South Pacific.

A second deployment to the Pacific for Nautilus followed from 1879 to 1881, and during this cruise the ship patrolled the South Pacific. After an overhaul in Germany in the early 1880s, Albatross spent the years from 1882 to 1888 overseas, beginning with a tour of South America that included an observation of the 1882 transit of Venus. She then moved back to the South Pacific; in 1886, she was involved in a dispute with Spain over control of the Caroline Islands and in 1887, she took the exiled Samoan king Malietoa Laupepa to the German colony of Kamerun in Central Africa. Nautilus's third and final tour in the Pacific began in 1883 and concluded in 1888; in 1885, she was involved in establishing a protectorate in the Marshall Islands. Nautilus was transferred to African waters in 1887 before returning home late the following year.

After returning to Germany in 1888, both vessels were used as a survey ship in home waters, Albatross in the North Sea and Nautilus in the Baltic Sea. Nautilus was struck from the naval register on 14 December 1896 and thereafter reduced to a coal storage hulk based in Kiel. Albatross was similarly struck on 9 January 1899 and after the navy blocked a potential sale to a South American navy, the ship eventually became a coal barge. Nautilus was sold to ship breakers in 1905 and dismantled in Swinemünde. Albatross was grounded and destroyed by a storm in March 1906.
