= 15 cm MRK L/22 =

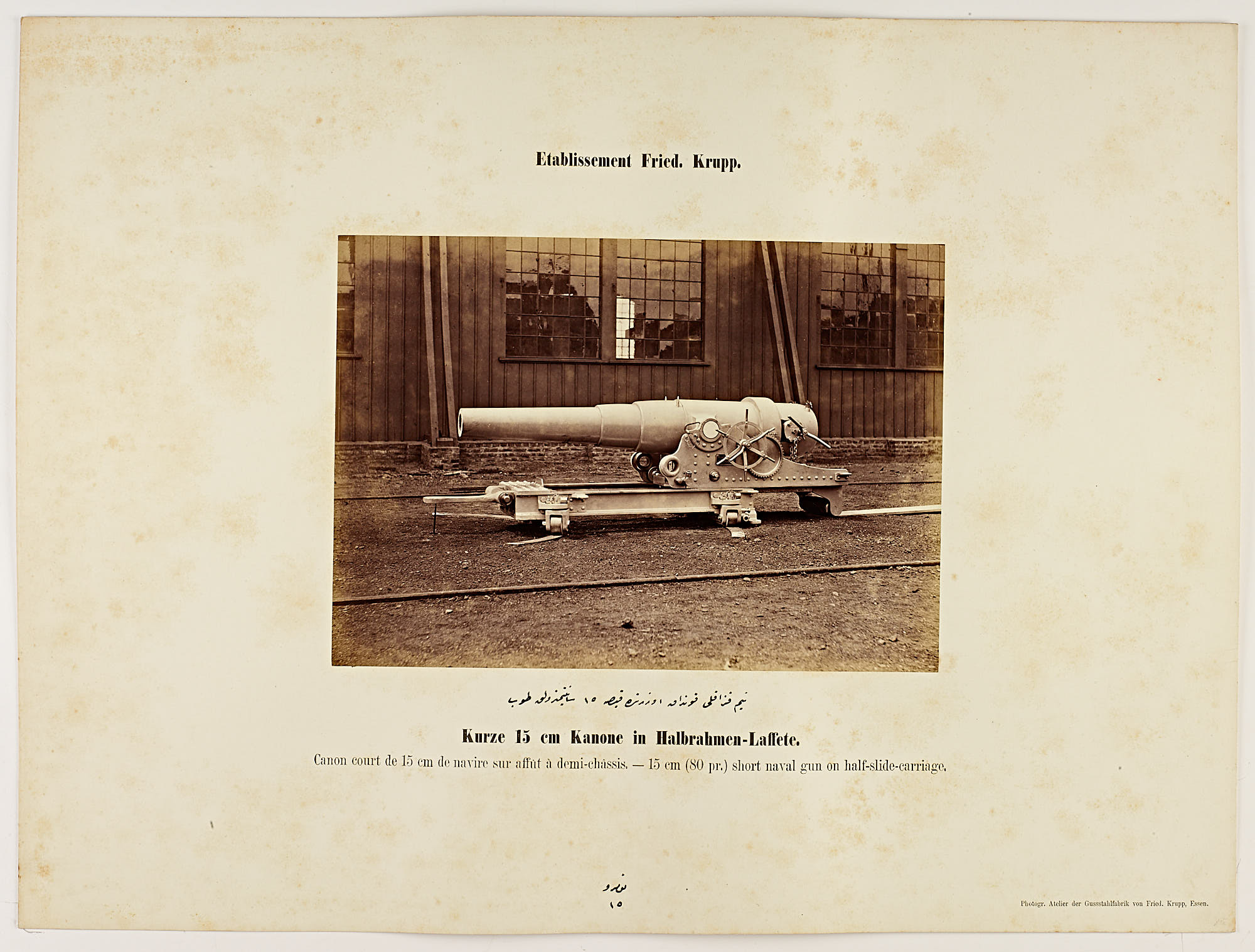
- Place of origin: German Empire

Service history
- Used by: Germany

Production history
- Designer: Krupp
- Designed: 1877
- Manufacturer: Krupp
- Produced: 1877
- No. built: ?

Specifications
- Mass: 3,500 kg
- Length: 3,270 mm
- Caliber: 149.1 mm
- Rate of fire: 1 shot / minute
- Muzzle velocity: 474 m/s
- Effective firing range: armor: 2,000 m soft targets: 5,000 m

The 15 cm Mantel Ring Kanone L/22 was a 15 cm 22 caliber long Krupp Mantel Ring Kanone (MRK). It was a rifled breech loader built-up gun with a Krupp cylindroprismatic sliding breech. It was designed as a Mantel Ring Kanone version of the 15 cm RK L/22.

== Context ==
=== The 15 cm Mantel Kanone L/22 ===
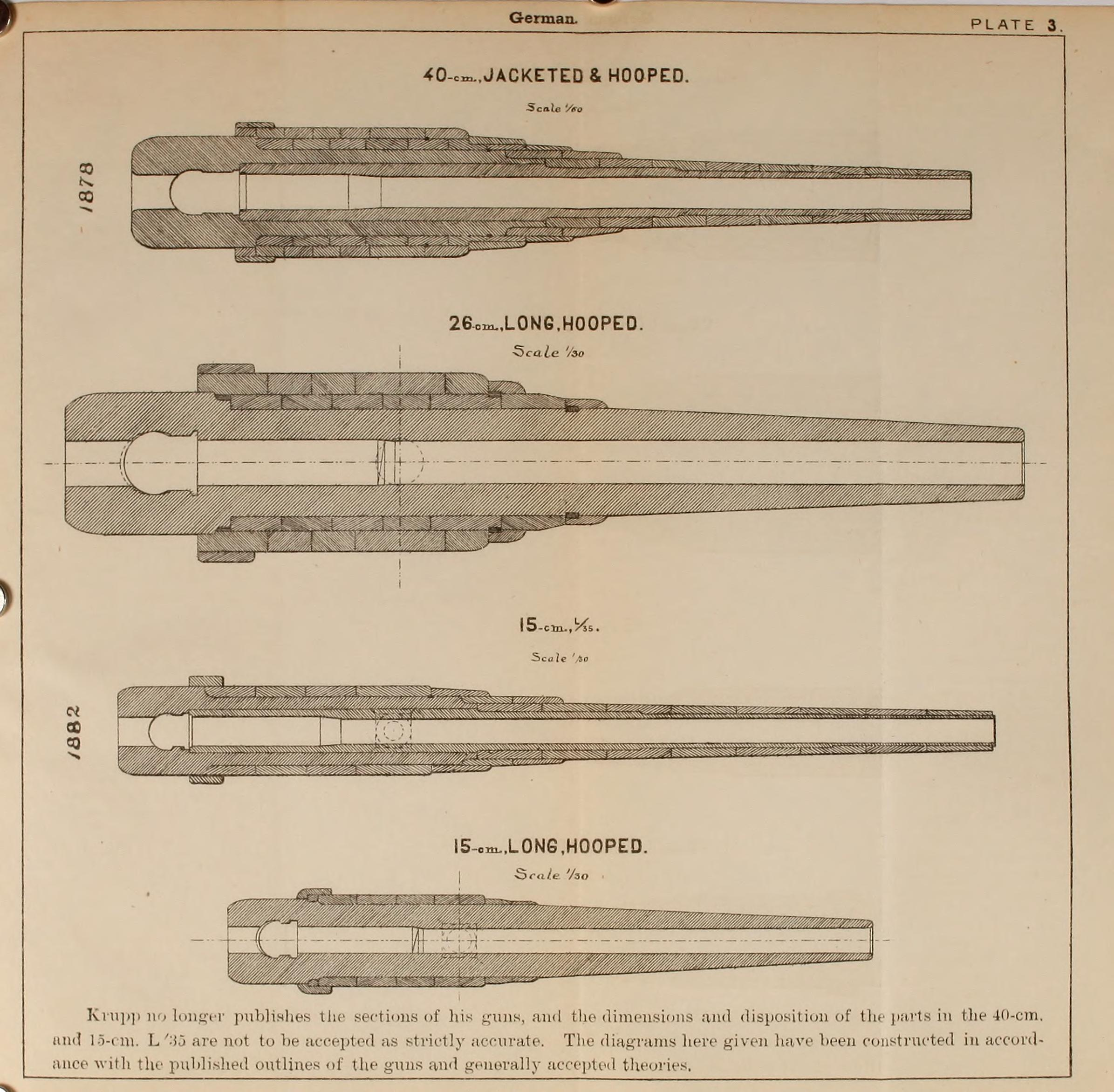
Hooped vs jacketed and hooped

By the mid-1870s, the German Navy had several models of 15 cm guns. The oldest that was still effective, was the 15 cm MK L/22. 'MK' stands for Mantel Kanone. It was basically a c/64 massive cast steel gun which had been changed in 1873. There were two types of massive 15 cm rifled cast steel breechloaders: the army's gezogener Gussstahl 24pfdr. c/64 and the gezogener Gussstahl 24 pfdr. der Marine, 61 Zentner.

The 1873 changes consisted of drawing in an inner tube to make the gun suitable for the projectiles and charges of the short 15 cm RK, and to change the twist rate to 65 calibers and use a simple breech instead of the Doppelkeil Verschluss. As the inner tube was pre-pressured by the rest of the barrel, known as Mantel or in English 'jacket', this led to a stronger gun barrel. Hence the name Mantel Kanone.

=== Ring Kanone and Mantel Ring Kanone ===
The 15 cm RK L/22 was more modern. RK stands for Ring Kanone, which means that the main barrel was pre-pressured by Ringe, known as hoops in English.

The Mantel Ring Kanone (MRK) construction combined Mantel and Ringe, and was therefore known in English as jacketed and hooped. Compared to the RK construction, the MRK construction increased the maximum explosive gas pressure that the barrel could withstand by about 25%.

== Development ==
Krupp made its first Mantel Ring Kanone in 1875. In Summer 1877, the German Admiralty then ordered a short 15 cm Mantel Ring Kanone at Krupp.

The order was a peculiar one. Unlike contemporary guns, it was to be short and have a relatively low charge of 6.5 kg. This had to result in a velocity comparable to that of the aptirte 15 cm RK (the adapted 15 cm RK L/22) with 7.75 kg charge. Otherwise, the dimensions should be that of the older 15 cm MK L/22.

The 15 cm MK L/22 weighed 3,200 kg including breech block. Its total length was 3,257 mm, shorter than the 3,270 mm of the Ring Kanone, but still L/22. (Von Müller's overview of gun barrels has a 'kurzes 15 cm Mantel Ring Rohr' of 3,270 mm length, and a shorter '15 cm Mantel Ring Rohr' of 3,257 mm length. The latter is obviously the 3,257 mm long '15 cm Mantel Rohr'.

With the weight of 3,200 kg in mind, the sense of the Admiralty's order becomes clear. It wanted a gun of the same power as the 15 cm RK L/22, but more suitable to the cramped conditions on board smaller vessels. Indeed, when the guns were tested alongside each other, it proved that with their recommended full charge, they could use the same ballistic table. Another measure to save weight and space was the simultaneous development of the Halbrahmen Lafette (half-slide carriage).

== Characteristics ==
=== Barrel ===
According to Müller, the 'kurzes 15 cm Mantel Ring Rohr' was 3,270 mm long. It had a caliber of 149.1 mm in the lands and 152.2 mm in the grooves. As usual for the navy guns of the time, it had 36 parallel grooves with a moderate twist length of 45 calibers. Contrary to the above, the weight was listed as 3,500 kg. Von Müller stated that it was still under construction, making the weight a bit uncertain. Other, later sources have the same data. However, as there was also a later model of the gun see below, it is not certain that the weight also applied to the earlier gun.

=== Projectiles ===
The 15 cm MRK L/22 fired two projectiles. The Hartguss Granate C/76 was 2.5 calibers long and weighed 34.5 kg. It was fired with a charge of 6.5 kg of PP C/68 gunpowder at a velocity of 446 m/s. It also fired the regular Granate C/76. This was also 2.5 calibers long, but weighed 29.5 kg. It was also fired with a charge of 6.5 kg of PP C/68 gunpowder and attained a velocity of 474 m/s.

These velocities were indeed the same as those of the 15 cm Ring Kanone or Mantel Kanone with copper driving bands firing the same projectiles with a charge of 7.75 kg of PP C/68. The results of these guns were significantly better than those of the older navy guns that used lead driving bands.

=== Carriages ===
The only carriage that was mentioned specifically as meant for the 15 cm MRK L/22 was the '15 cm Halbrahmenlafette C/77 für kurze Ring- und Mantel-Ringkanonen. This carriage weighed 1,909 kg, had a firing height of 860 mm, and could elevate to 14 degrees and decline to 4.5 degrees.

=== A later model ===
A specific mention of a later model of the 15 cm MRK L/22 might shed some light on the weight of the early model. At the 1880 Gewerbe-Ausstellung zu Düsseldorf, Krupp exhibited a 15 cm MRK L/22 on Halbrahmenlafette which was quite different from the 1877 model. This was a Krupp gun, not a German army or navy gun. Its exhibition did not mean that the German armed forces had bought it.

The 1880 Düsseldorf gun weighed 3,500 kg, was 3,270 mm long, and had a caliber of 149.1 mm. It had 24 grooves. The gun was mounted on a Halbrahmenlafette of 1,860 kg. The carriage allowed 14 degrees eolevation and 4.5 degrees declination.

The data of this Düsseldorf gun are interesting, because they mention the gun firing with 8 kg of gunpowder. This is kind of logical for a gun of the same dimensions as the 15 cm RK L/22. It also fired heavier projectiles. These were:

- A 38.5 kg steel grenade
- A hardened iron grenade of 39 kg
- A regular cast iron grenade of 31.5 kg.

== Use ==
In 1885, the 15 cm MRK L/22 was renamed to simply 15 cm Kanone L/22, abbreviated 15 cm K. L/22

The Arcona-class frigate SMS Vineta got 17 15 cm Mantel Ring Kanonen in 1879.
