= SMS Nautilus (1871) =

German gunboat

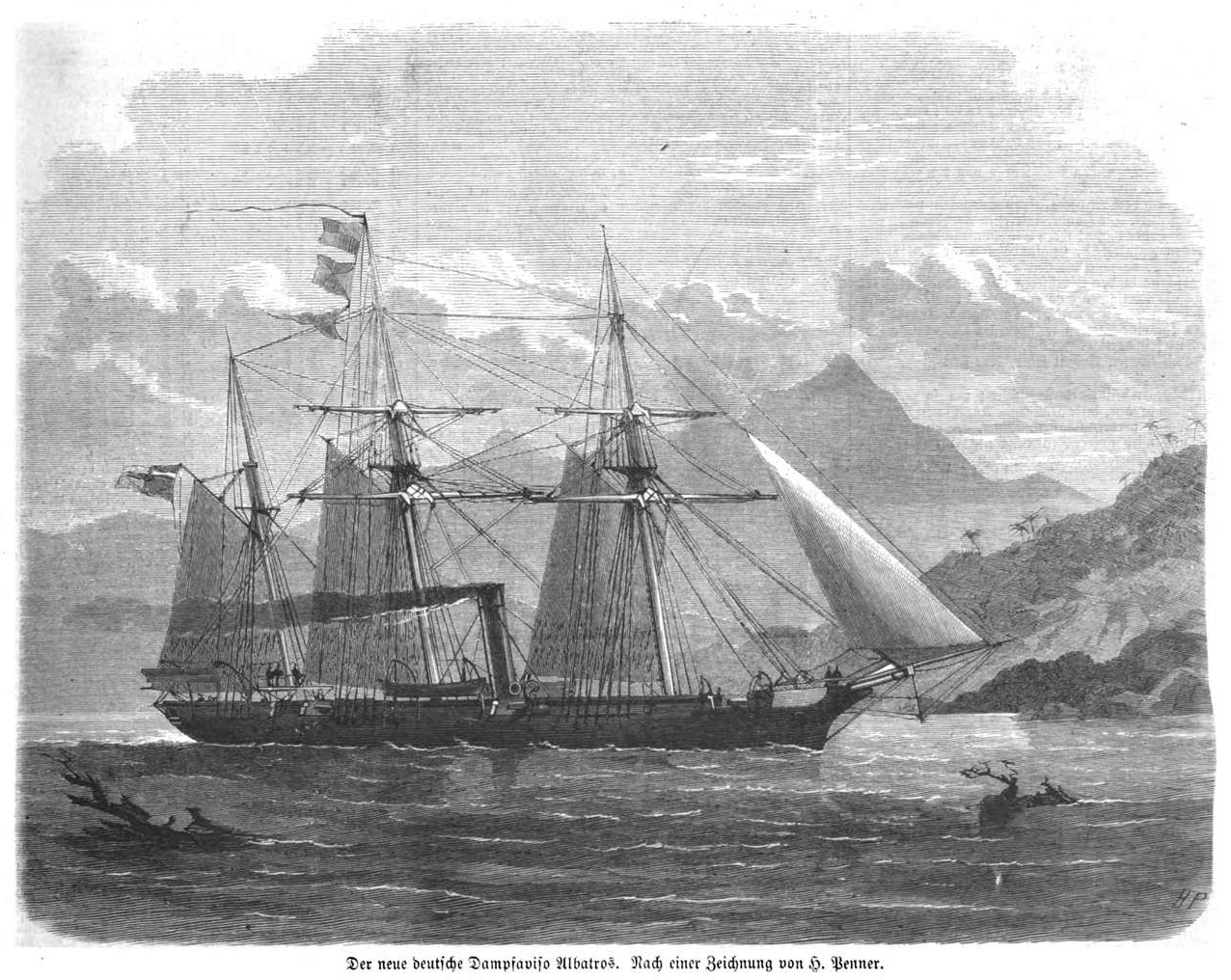
- Etching of SMS Albatross, sister ship to Nautilus

History
- Name: SMS Nautilus
- Operator: Imperial German Navy
- Ordered: 9 November 1869
- Builder: Kaiserliche Werft Danzig
- Laid down: 1870
- Launched: 31 August 1871
- Commissioned: 4 June 1873
- Decommissioned: 7 October 1893
- Stricken: 14 December 1896
- Fate: Broken up, 1905

General characteristics
- Class & type: Albatross-class gunboat
- Displacement: Design: 713 t (702 long tons; 786 short tons); Full load: 786 t (774 long tons; 866 short tons)
- Length: 56.95 m (186 ft 10 in) o/a
- Beam: 8.32 m (27 ft 4 in)
- Draft: 3.75 m (12 ft 4 in)
- Installed power: 2 × fire-tube boilers; 496 metric horsepower (489 ihp)
- Propulsion: 2 × marine steam engines; 1 × screw propeller
- Speed: 10 knots (19 km/h; 12 mph)
- Range: 1,270 nautical miles (2,350 km; 1,460 mi) at 10 knots (19 km/h; 12 mph)
- Complement: 5 officers; 98 enlisted men
- Armament: 2 × 15 cm (5.9 in) K L/22 built-up guns; 2 × 12 cm (4.7 in) K L/23 built-up guns

SMS Nautilus was the second and final member of the Albatross class of steam gunboats built for the German Kaiserliche Marine (Imperial Navy) in the 1870s. The ship was ordered as part of a construction program intended to begin replacing the old Jäger-class gunboats that had been built a decade earlier. Unlike the older ships, Nautilus was intended to serve abroad to protect German economic interests overseas. The ship was armed with a battery of four guns, and had a top speed of 10 knots (19 km/h; 12 mph).

Nautilus spent most of her career abroad, first off the coast of Spain in 1874–1875 during the Third Carlist War; the ship's captain was involved in settling a dispute between the Carlists and a German merchant ship captain whose vessel was attacked by Carlist forces. Nautilus thereafter sailed to the Pacific for a tour from 1876 to 1878 that saw the ship operate primarily off the coast of China. A second deployment to the Pacific followed from 1879 to 1881, and during this cruise the ship patrolled the South Pacific. Her third and final tour in the Pacific began in 1883. During the latter voyage in 1885, she was involved in establishing a protectorate in the Marshall Islands. Nautilus was transferred from the Pacific to African waters in 1887 before returning home late the following year. She was used as a survey ship from 1891 to 1893, but was in poor condition by that time, and she was accordingly struck from the naval register in 1896. The ship was used as a coal storage hulk until 1905, when she was sold to ship breakers and dismantled.

== Design ==
In the late 1850s and early 1860s, the Prussian Navy had embarked on a construction program that included the fifteen Jäger-class gunboats and eight Camäleon-class gunboats. By 1869, the navy realized that the earliest vessels, starting with the badly rotted Crocodill, would need to be replaced. Design work started for the new class, which was intended for overseas cruising, instead of coastal defense as the earlier vessels had been.

Nautilus was 56.95 meters (186 ft 10 in) long overall, with a beam of 8.32 m (27 ft 4 in) and a draft of 3.75 m (12.3 ft). She displaced 713 metric tons (702 long tons) normally and 786 t (774 long tons) at full load. The ship's crew consisted of 5 officers and 98 enlisted men. She was powered by a pair of marine steam engines that drove one 2-bladed screw propeller, with steam provided by two coal-fired fire-tube boilers, which gave her a top speed of 10 knots (19 km/h; 12 mph) at 496 metric horsepower (489 ihp). When steaming at maximum speed, the ship had a cruising range of 1,270 nautical miles (2,350 km; 1,460 mi). As built, she was equipped with a three-masted barque rig. The ship was armed with a battery of two 15 cm (5.9 in) RK L/22 built-up guns and two 12 cm (4.7 in) K L/23 built-up guns.

== Service history ==
The contract for Nautilus was awarded on 9 November 1869; she was initially ordered as an aviso to comply with the fleet plan of 1867. (Note: The fleet plan of 1867 was drawn up in part to expand the Prussian Navy's cruising force to protect Prussian maritime trade abroad.) The keel for the new ship was laid down at the Königlich Werft in Danzig in 1870 under the contract name "A". (Note: German warships were ordered under provisional names. Additions to the fleet were given a single letter; ships intended to replace older or lost vessels were ordered as "Ersatz (name of the ship to be replaced)".) The ship was named after the eponymous marine mollusc. She was launched on 31 August 1871, by which time Prussia had unified the German states as the German Empire. Completion of the ship was delayed while the sea trials of her sister ship Albatross were carried out. Nautilus eventually began her own trials, though not in commission, on 15 November 1872. Testing concluded on 7 December, and on 7 May 1873, she was formally reclassified as a gunboat. The ship was commissioned on 4 June, under the command of Korvettenkapitän (KK—Corvette Captain) Johann-Heinrich Pirner, into what was now the Kaiserliche Marine (Imperial Navy). Nautilus initially joined the Training Squadron, based in Wilhelmshaven and led by the flagship Hertha. She took part in training maneuvers at Kiel that began on 24 June. Nautilus decommissioned on 17 September for the winter months.

=== Deployment to Spain ===
Nautilus was recommissioned on 17 March 1874. In August, she and Albatross were ordered to Spain in response to the Cantonal rebellion and the contemporaneous Third Carlist War. The deployment was in response to attacks against Germans in the country, including the summary execution of a retired captain of the Prussian Navy on the orders of Prince Carlos, the leader of the Carlist rebellion against the First Spanish Republic. The German chancellor, Otto von Bismarck, pressed the navy to send a squadron of ironclads to Spain in response to the attacks, but Kaiser Wilhelm I and Albrecht von Stosch, the Chief of the Admiralty, preferred a smaller and less intrusive option. Therefore, Nautilus and Albatross were to be sent; they were ordered to avoid interfering in internal Spanish affairs and to act in close cooperation with Paul von Hatzfeldt, the German ambassador to Spain.

On 8 August, the two gunboats departed Kiel, under the overall command of the captain of Nautilus, Kapitänleutnant (KL—Captain Lieutenant) Otto Zembsch, as he was the senior of the two captains. They arrived in Santander, Spain, on 24 August and thereafter patrolled the northern coast of Spain. Their presence prompted rumors that the Germans would intervene in the fighting in Spain, and Carlist artillery batteries opened fire on them while they cruised off Guetaria. Nautilus and Albatross returned fire and then continued on along the coast. The ships returned to Santander the fall to seek shelter from heavy storms, remaining there through October. Illegal weapon shipments from France prompted the Spanish Navy, the British Royal Navy, and the German gunboats to begin joint operations to interdict the vessels carrying guns to Spain. Nautilus, Albatross, and the British gunboat HMS Fly patrolled the area through the end of the year. On 12 December, Nautilus rescued most of the crew from the Italian barque La Pace after it sank in Santander.

As weather in the area worsened as winter approached, Albatross was ordered to return to Germany on 19 December, while Nautilus departed the following day for La Plata, by way of the West Indies. But events in northern Spain would quickly see both ships recalled; the Rostock-flagged brig Gustav had put in at Guetaria due to the weather, and Carlist forces had opened fire, prompting the crew to abandon the vessel. Gustav then ran aground and was seized by the Carlist forces, who demanded payment to return the vessel and its cargo. Bismarck immediately demanded a retaliation, and both ships were ordered back to Spain. In addition, the screw corvette Augusta, which was in Curaçao, was sent to join them. The three ships had assembled in Santander by 31 January 1875, and Zembsch led negotiations with the Carlists. They eventually reached an acceptable resolution, and the two sides exchanged salutes in Guetaria on 28 April, formally ending the incident. Nautilus then sailed for Gibraltar, so as to be available quickly in the event of another incident.

Nautilus thereafter sailed south to visit ports in Morocco on 12 June; she cruised off the Moroccan coast through the end of September, interrupted only by a period of repair in Cádiz, Spain. The ship was then ordered back to the northern Spanish coast, as unrest there threatened German commercial interests. She arrived back in Santander on 17 October. Zembsch left the ship at that time. Nautilus remained in Spanish waters until early 1876, by which time the Carlist rebellion had been defeated. On 3 March, the ship received orders to return home, and after arriving in Kiel, she was drydocked for examination. Found to be in good condition, she received a pair of 4 cm (1.6 in) anti-balloon guns, at the insistence of her new captain, KK Victor Valois, in preparation for another deployment overseas.

=== First deployment to the Pacific ===
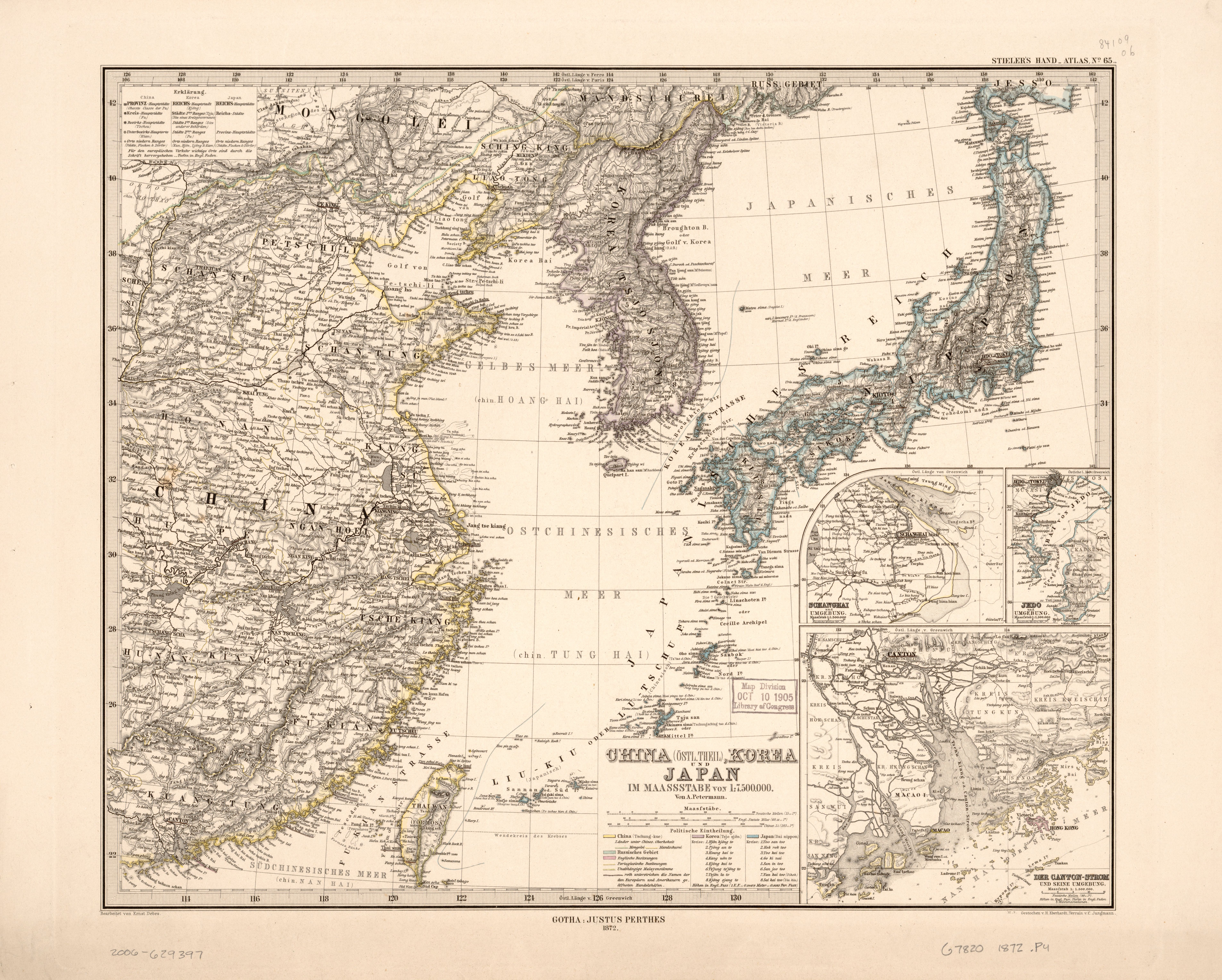
German 1872 map of China, Japan, and Korea

Nautilus departed Germany on 5 April 1876, bound for East Asia. While in Port Said, Egypt, on 19 April, the ship received orders to divert to Constantinople in the Ottoman Empire in response to the murder of the German and French consuls in Salonika. Nautilus was to reinforce the gunboat Meteor, which was the station ship there, until other German vessels could arrive. On 25 July, the gunboat Comet relieved Nautilus, allowing her to continue on to Asia. She arrived in Singapore on 11 September, where she joined the German cruising unit in the area, led by Alexander von Monts aboard the screw frigate Vineta. For the rest of 1876, Nautilus toured several ports in south China. In early 1877, she was cruising in the Gulf of Tonkin, and she was sent to Hainan to conduct surveys of the island. In need of repairs by mid-April, Nautilus sailed to Nagasaki, Japan, for periodic maintenance that concluded on 24 September. A typhoon struck Yokohama, Japan, on 2 October while Nautilus was in the harbor, and she was driven into a British steamship, suffering damage. On 30 November, Valois, along with the captain of the screw frigate Elisabeth and Carl von Eisendecher, the German ambassador to Japan, paid a visit to Emperor Meiji.

By 18 January 1878, Nautilus had moved to Shantou, China, and there she received orders to return to Germany. Once again, while in Port Said on 16 March, the ship received a change of instructions, this time to sail for the coast of Ottoman Palestine, where unrest directed against Europeans necessitated intervention to prevent attacks. The situation had calmed by the end of July, permitting Nautilus to resume her voyage home. After arriving in Kiel, the ship was decommissioned on 7 September for a lengthy overhaul that included repairs to her boilers. The anti-balloon guns were removed, and a pair of 37 mm (1.5 in) Hotchkiss revolver cannon were added. The work was completed by 20 May 1879, when she was recommissioned to replace Albatross on station in the South Pacific.

=== Second deployment to the Pacific ===
Nautilus departed on 17 June, bound for Australia, and while passing through the English Channel, she stopped in Folkestone, Britain, to check the salvage operation attempting to raise the ironclad Grosser Kurfürst, which had accidentally sunk there earlier that year. She arrived in Singapore on 5 September and remained there for eleven days; the ship's captain, KK Jeschke, had died of heat stroke while the ship passed through the Suez Canal, and Nautilus had to wait in Singapore until his replacement arrived. Nautilus thereafter left for Sydney, Australia, arriving on 3 November. She met Albatross there. Nautilus then sailed north to Apia in Samoa on 15 November, arriving there eventually on 11 December. There, she met the screw corvette Bismarck, the flagship of German naval forces in the region. Shortly thereafter, the power struggle between the rivals Malietoa Laupepa and Malietoa Talavou Tonumaipeʻa during the Samoan Civil War were decided in the latter's favor, Bismarck departed on 25 January 1880, leaving Nautilus as the sole German warship in the South Pacific.

Nautilus then departed to visit Auckland, New Zealand. On the way, she stopped in Nukuʻalofa, the capital of Tonga, to attempt to improve relations with Germany. While Nautilus was in Auckland from 26 April to 20 May, the Tongan crown prince died, and the ship carried his body back to Nukuʻalofa. The act led to the Tongan government loosening restrictions on German merchants in the kingdom. On 26 June, Nautilus arrived back in Apia, where she rendezvoused with the gunboat Hyäne, which was sent to reinforce the German presence in the region. From mid-August to mid-December, Nautilus toured Australia, stopping in Brisbane, Sydney, and Melbourne. While in the last city, the ship's crew contributed workers to finish the German exhibit at the Melbourne International Exhibition held that year. She also sent her landing party ashore to take part in a parade held on 9 November in honor of the birthday of Albert, Prince of Wales. By March 1881, Nautilus had returned to Samoa. While in Apia on 25 March, she received orders to return to Germany. She departed five days later and arrived in Brisbane on 1 May; by that time, her replacement, the gunboat Habicht, had arrived in Apia on 28 April. Nautilus arrived back in Kiel on 15 September, where she was decommissioned for another overhaul.

=== Third deployment to the Pacific ===
Nautilus recommissioned on 2 October 1883 under the command of KK Richard Aschenborn for another deployment to the south Pacific. For the second time on a voyage to a foreign station, the ship's captain fell ill, this time with typhus, and the ship's executive officer took command. Nautilus stopped in Porto Grande Bay in Cape Verde, but there were no medical facilities that could treat Aschenborn. The ship departed next for Cape Town, but while on the way, Aschenborn recovered, and he resumed command on 30 December. From 24 to 26 January 1884, the ship stopped in Lüderitz Bay to inspect the activities of German traders in the area. Nautilus then returned south to Cape Town on 4 February, where Aschenborn sent his report on Lüderitz Bay to the German government. Nautilus's activities in the area prompted fears in Britain that the Germans would take control of the area, but the German consul in Cape Town assured the local British government that Aschenborn had no such orders. Aschenborn's report on the conditions at Lüderitz Bay and the terms of Adolf Lüderitz's deeds of ownership in the area proved to be decisive in Bismarck's decision to seize what would become German South West Africa. The ship then continued on to the Pacific on 5 February, but instead of returning to the south Pacific, she sailed to East Asian waters. The naval command directed Nautilus to reinforce German naval strength in the region in response to the Sino-French War. On 6 April, Nautilus arrived in Hong Kong and joined the cruiser squadron in the area, led by the screw corvette Stosch; Nautilus was herself re-designated as a cruiser that day.

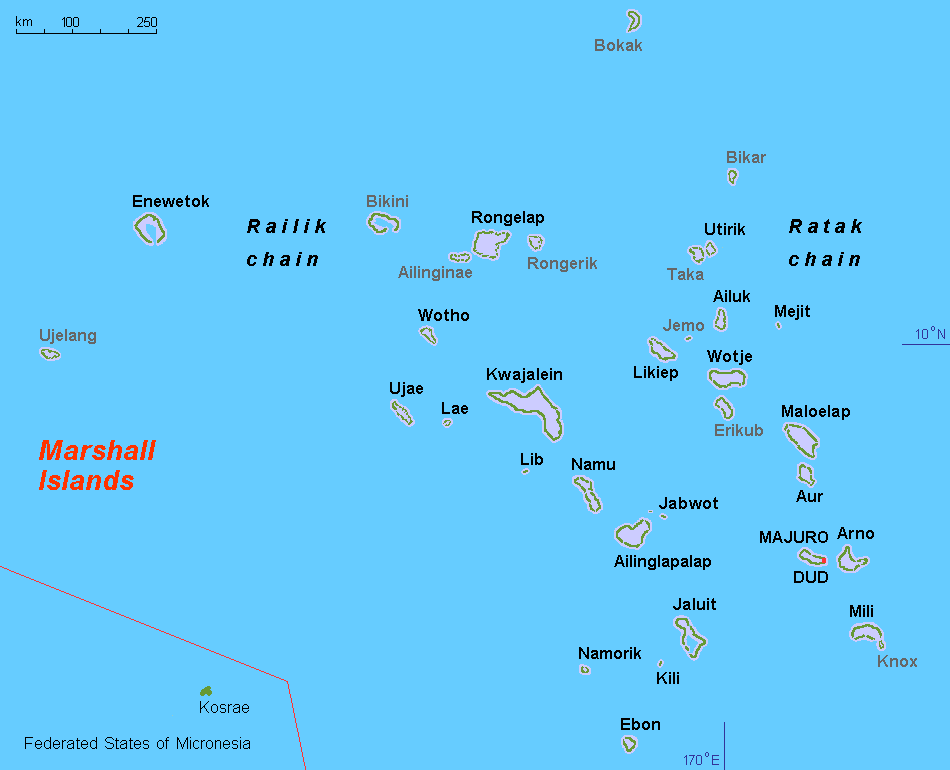
Map of the Marshall Islands

Nautilus sailed next to Canton, China, where she remained with only short interruptions until mid-July. She sailed north on 17 July for Shanghai, China, where she joined a large international fleet. The German contingent also included Stosch and the screw corvette Prinz Adalbert. On 13 August, Nautilus moved to Tientsin, where she could be at the disposal of the German ambassador in Beijing; she remained there until the end of March 1885. During the winter months, the ship's rigging was removed and a protected upper deck was temporarily installed. The ship left Tientsin on 1 April and sailed back south to Shanghai, but already on 30 April, she left for Chemulpo, Korea, in response to civil unrest following the murder of the Korean crown prince. She was joined there by the gunboat Iltis. Nautilus left Korea on 9 July and carried out survey work for a time before returning to Chemulpo and then sailing on to Nagasaki, where on 1 September the ship received orders to finally sail south to her original intended destination: the south Pacific. By that time, KK Fritz Rötger had replaced Aschenborn as the ship's captain. She passed through Yokohama before continuing on to the south Pacific.

After departing Yokohama on 13 September, Rötger opened secret orders to establish a protectorate in the Marshall Islands. The ship arrived in Jaluit, the main atoll in the Marshalls, on 13 October. The next day, Kabna, the local chief, visited Nautilus and Rötger in turn visited the island on 15 October, when the protection treaty was ratified. The terms of the treaty stipulated that the eastern Ratak island chain became German property, though the western Ralik chain remained independent. The agreement secured a source of copra for Germany. The official ceremony to raise the German flag at Jaluit marking the treaty was held on 17 October, followed by similar ceremonies at seven other atolls in the chain. On returning to Jaluit on 29 October, Rötger learned of attacks by a US missionary group against German merchants on Ebon Atoll, and he imposed a fine on the missionaries. Nautilus left the Marshalls on 7 November and returned to Yokohama on 28 November.

Nautilus then continued on to Shanghai, where she was dry-docked for periodic maintenance that lasted from 23 December to 10 March 1886. She thereafter toured several Chinese, Korean, and Japanese ports in the region before joining the other ships of the cruiser squadron, led by Bismarck. Together, the ships cruised in the Yellow Sea on 21 August and later visited Japan. That month, Rötger was relieved by KK Curt van Hoven. While the ships were at sea, an outbreak of cholera affected thirty-two of Nautilus's crew, forcing her to stop in Nagasaki to take them to a hospital. The other ships of the cruiser squadron were ordered to sail to the recently created colony of German East Africa, but Nautilus remained behind. She saw little activity of note over the following months, and on 12 May 1887, she, too, was ordered to German East Africa. The ship was to pass through the Sulu Archipelago to ensure that disputes between the Spanish colonial government and the local residents did not threaten other Europeans, but this proved to be unnecessary. Nautilus arrived in Zanzibar on 15 August to replace Hyäne, which had left the previous month. The cruiser squadron had also departed by then, leaving just Nautilus and the gunboat Möwe on station in the colony.

From 4 to 26 December, Nautilus carried the German explorers Carl Peters and Walter von Saint Paul-Illaire from Saadani to Mombasa, Kenya; on the way, she stopped in Lamu and Manda Bay in Wituland. The ship thereafter carried out surveys and visited ports in the region, including Wasin, Kenya, and Obbia, Somalia. During this period, Nautilus was also sent to mediate trade disputes between the Sultan of Wituland and German merchants. In March 1888, Nautilus went to Zanzibar to represent Germany at the funeral ceremony for the recently deceased Sultan Barghash bin Said and the coronation of his successor, Khalifah bin Said. In June, Hoven fell ill and had to be sent home; the ship's executive officer commanded the vessel for the rest of the ship's deployment. On 9 August, Nautilus received orders to return home while in Durban, South Africa. The poor communications of the period meant that neither the Admiralty or the crew aboard Nautilus were aware that the Abushiri revolt had broken out against German rule in East Africa. She arrived back in Kiel on 7 December, and was decommissioned there on the 19th.

=== Later career ===
Nautilus underwent an overhaul at Kiel that included removing her armament and reducing her sailing rig. She was thereafter used as a survey ship, and was recommissioned on 1 April 1891. She operated in the western Baltic Sea for the next two years, surveying various coastal areas, including a part of Danzig Bay where the ironclads Deutschland and Kaiser had run aground during training maneuvers. Her periods in commission lasted from 9 April to 9 October 1890; 1 April 1891 to 30 September 1891, during which time she was captained by KL Wilhelm Kindt; 1 April to 7 October 1892; and 5 April to 7 October 1893, when she was decommissioned for the last time. During an inspection after leaving service, she was found to be in poor condition and deemed not worth repairing. She was struck from the naval register on 14 December 1896 and thereafter reduced to a coal storage hulk based in Kiel. She was sold to ship breakers in 1905 and dismantled in Swinemünde.
