= SMS Albatross (1871) =

German gunboat

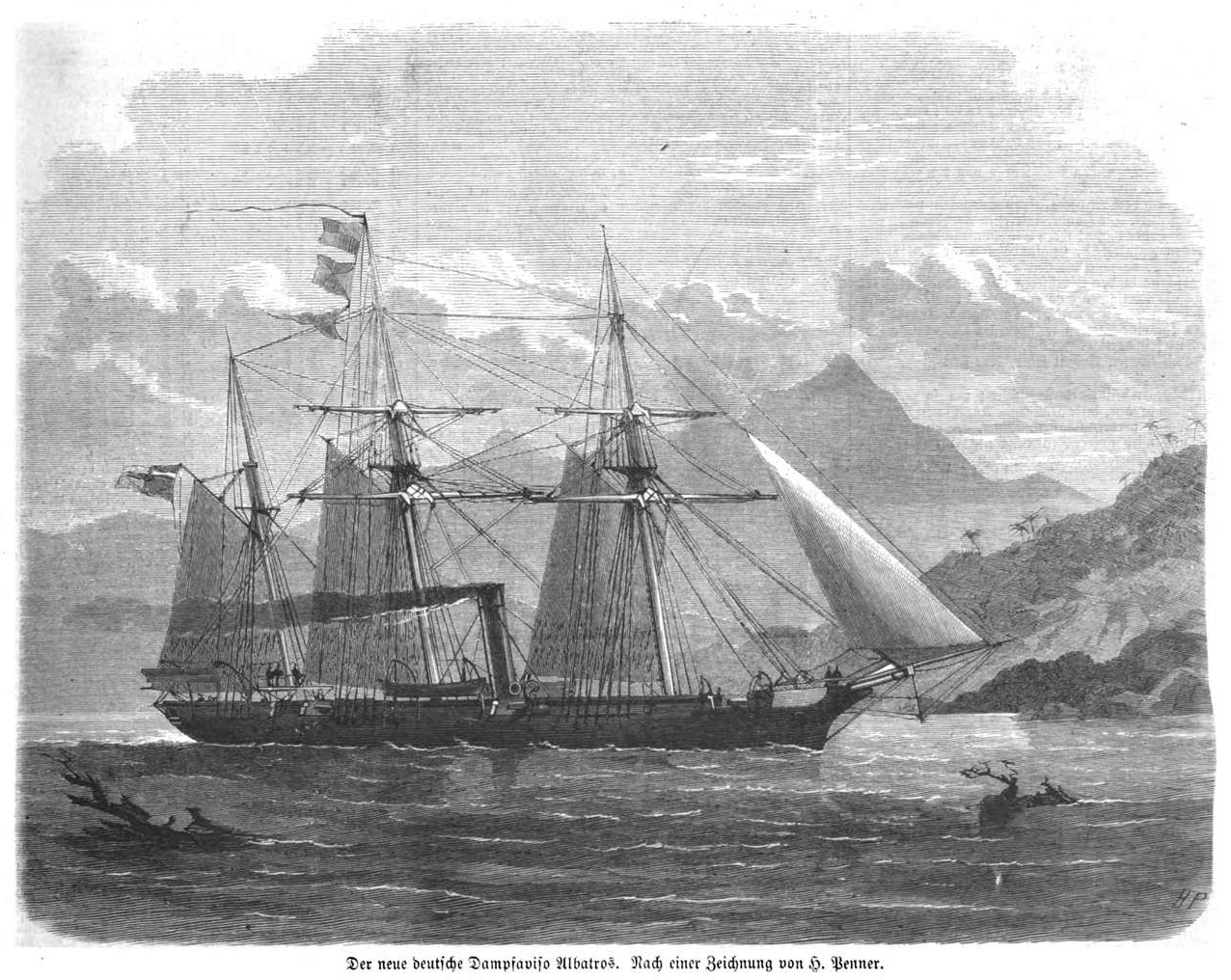
- Etching of SMS Albatross by H.Penner

History
- Name: SMS Albatross
- Namesake: Albatross
- Operator: Imperial German Navy
- Builder: Kaiserliche Werft Danzig
- Laid down: 1869
- Launched: 11 March 1871
- Commissioned: 23 December 1871
- Decommissioned: 30 September 1898
- Stricken: 9 January 1899
- Fate: Wrecked, March 1906

General characteristics
- Class & type: Albatross-class gunboat
- Displacement: Design: 713 t (702 long tons; 786 short tons); Full load: 786 t (774 long tons; 866 short tons)
- Length: 56.95 m (186 ft 10 in) o/a
- Beam: 8.32 m (27 ft 4 in)
- Draft: 3.75 m (12 ft 4 in)
- Installed power: 2 × fire-tube boilers; 491 metric horsepower (484 ihp)
- Propulsion: 2 × marine steam engines; 1 × screw propeller
- Speed: 10.5 knots (19.4 km/h; 12.1 mph)
- Range: 1,270 nautical miles (2,350 km; 1,460 mi) at 10 knots (19 km/h; 12 mph)
- Complement: 5 officers; 98 enlisted men
- Armament: 2 × 15 cm (5.9 in) K L/22 built-up guns; 2 × 12 cm (4.7 in) K L/23 built-up guns

SMS Albatross was a steam gunboat, the lead ship of the Albatross class, which were built for the German Kaiserliche Marine (Imperial Navy) in the late 1860s and early 1870s. The ship was ordered as part of a construction program intended to begin replacing the old Jäger-class gunboats that had been built a decade earlier. Unlike the older ships, Albatross was intended to serve abroad to protect German economic interests overseas. The ship was armed with a battery of four guns, and had a top speed of 10.5 knots (19.4 km/h; 12.1 mph).

Albatross spent the first half of her career overseas, beginning with a deployment to South America from 1872 to 1874. After a brief period of time in home waters in 1874, she sailed to Spain to protect German nationals there during the Third Carlist War, patrolling the coast there into 1875. From 1877 to 1880, Albatross cruised in the Pacific Ocean, which included periods in Chinese waters as well as the South Pacific. After an overhaul in Germany in the early 1880s, Albatross spent the years from 1882 to 1888 overseas, beginning with a tour of South America that included an observation of the 1882 transit of Venus. She then moved back to the South Pacific, and in 1887, she took the exiled Samoan king Malietoa Laupepa to the German colony of Kamerun in Central Africa. After returning to Germany in 1888, she was used as a survey ship in home waters. She was eventually struck from the naval register in 1899, sold soon thereafter, and eventually converted into a storage hulk in 1905. She did not survive long, being wrecked in a storm the following year.

== Design ==
In the late 1850s and early 1860s, the Prussian Navy had embarked on a construction program that included the fifteen Jäger-class gunboats and eight Camäleon-class gunboats. By 1869, the navy realized that the earliest vessels, starting with the badly rotted Crocodill, would need to be replaced. Design work started for the new class, which were intended for overseas cruising, instead of coastal defense as the earlier vessels had been.

Albatross was 56.95 meters (186 ft 10 in) long overall, with a beam of 8.32 m (27 ft 4 in) and a draft of 3.75 m (12.3 ft). She displaced 713 metric tons (702 long tons) normally and 786 t (774 long tons) at full load. The ship's crew consisted of 5 officers and 98 enlisted men. She was powered by a pair of marine steam engines that drove one 2-bladed propeller. Steam was provided by two coal-fired fire-tube boilers, which gave her a top speed of 10.5 knots (19.4 km/h; 12.1 mph) at 491 metric horsepower (484 ihp). When steaming at 10 knots (19 km/h; 12 mph), the ship had a cruising range of 1,270 nautical miles (2,350 km; 1,460 mi). As built, she was equipped with a three-masted barque rig. The ship was armed with a battery of two 15 cm (5.9 in) RK L/22 built-up guns and two 12 cm (4.7 in) K L/23 built-up guns.

== Service history ==
Albatross was laid down at the Königlich Werft in Danzig in 1869 under the provisional name "Ersatz Crocodill". (Note: German warships were ordered under provisional names. Additions to the fleet were given a single letter; ships intended to replace older or lost vessels were ordered as "Ersatz (name of the ship to be replaced)".) Construction of the ship was delayed by the Franco-Prussian War of 1870–1871, and she was launched on 11 March 1871. The ship was commissioned later that year on 23 December to begin sea trials; her first commander was Korvettenkapitän (KK—Corvette Captain) Max von der Goltz. During the initial testing process, she frequently returned to the shipyard for alterations, and two other captains took command of the ship. She was decommissioned on 24 August 1872 and the trials were officially pronounced completed in mid-September.

=== Deployment to South America, 1872–1874 ===
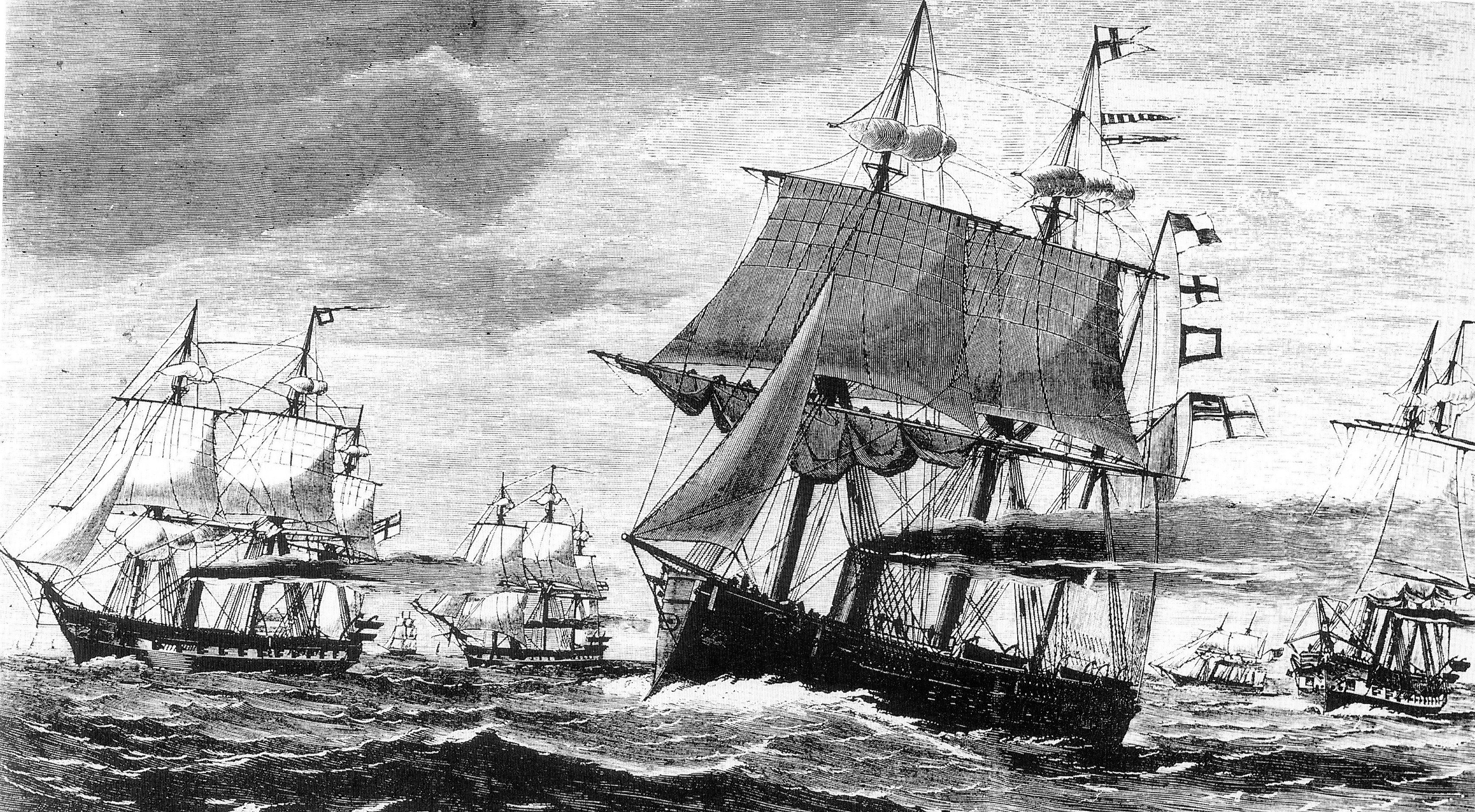
The Flying Squadron in 1872

Albatross was recommissioned on 1 October and assigned to the Flying Squadron, led by the ironclad Friedrich Carl, along with the screw frigates Elisabeth, Gazelle, and Vineta, under the command of Kommodore (Commodore) Reinhold von Werner. The squadron was sent abroad to show the flag along the eastern coast of South America and in the West Indies, and to protect German commercial interests during periods of internal unrest in the countries of the region. The ships of the squadron met in Barbados on 28 November, and thereafter toured several ports in Venezuela, Colombia, Haiti, Jamaica, and Curaçao. Conditions in the region had calmed by that time, and no attacks on Germans had materialized, so while the ships were in Havana, Cuba, on 10 March 1873, they received orders to return to Germany. Only Albatross was to remain on station.

She spent the summer months cruising off the coast of Brazil, voyaging as far south as Montevideo, Uruguay, and Buenos Aires, Argentina. There, the ship was greeted by a large number of German emigres who had moved to the area recently. She thereafter returned to the West Indies to protect Germans in Haiti during a revolution in the country. Albatross then visited other ports in the Antilles. The ship conducted shooting practice off Saint Thomas in the Danish West Indies in early January 1874, which led to rumors that Germany intended to annex the island. Albatross spent the next two months cruising in the West Indies. By 17 March, the screw corvette Augusta had arrived to replace Albatross, allowing her to begin the voyage home. She arrived in Kiel on 17 April, and was decommissioned there on 30 April.

=== Operations in Europe, 1874–1875 ===
Albatross was reactivated shortly after being placed in reserve, being recommissioned on 19 May. On 6 June, she was assigned to the summer training squadron, which was led by Konteradmiral (Rear Admiral) Ludwig von Henk and included the ironclads Kronprinz and Friedrich Carl, the screw corvette Ariadne, and the aviso Grille. The ships embarked on a training cruise to visit Britain on 25 July, and they escorted Crown Prince Friedrich Wilhelm and his wife to the Isle of Wight. Albatross remained there while the other ships continued on, so she could be available for the crown prince's use. She made several short trips in the area over the following days, but on 29 July, she returned to Kiel to meet the rest of the squadron. There, her crew immediately began making preparations for a deployment to Spain. Albatross and her sister ship Nautilus were to be sent, under the command of the captain of the latter vessel.

Spain was at that time in the midst of the Third Carlist War between the Republican government, and rival factions for backers of the pretenders to the throne, Don Carlos and Alfonso. The deployment was in response to attacks against Germans in the country, including the summary execution of a retired captain of the Prussian Navy on the orders of Carlos. The German chancellor, Otto von Bismarck, pressed the navy to send a squadron of ironclads to Spain in response to the attacks, but Kaiser Wilhelm I and Albrecht von Stosch, the Chief of the Admiralty, preferred a smaller and less intrusive option. Therefore, Albatross and Nautilus were to be sent; they were ordered to avoid interfering in internal Spanish affairs and to act in close cooperation with Paul von Hatzfeldt, the German ambassador to Spain.

The two ships sailed from Kiel on 8 August and arrived in Santander on sixteen days later; much of the surrounding area had been captured by the Carlists, but Santander and the nearby cities of Bilbao and San Sebastián remained in the hands of the Republicans. The two gunboats initially patrolled the northern coast of Spain, but on 5 September, while cruising off Guetaria, they came under rifle fire from Carlist soldiers. The Germans returned fire with their cannon, prompting the Carlists to retreat quickly. The ships then sailed back to Santander, where they were welcomed by the local citizens. On 12 December, while both gunboats were in Santander, the Italian barque La Pace was driven ashore in a severe storm. Albatross and Nautilus both sent a boat to rescue the crew, who had been swept into the sea as La Pace broke apart. Between the two of them, the German boats rescued five men out of eleven. As the severe winter weather curtailed the ships' ability to patrol the coast, and the feared attacks against Germans in the area failed to materialize, the Admiralty recalled Albatross and ordered Nautilus to sail across the Atlantic to South American waters. The men aboard Albatross transferred surplus equipment to Nautilus for her deployment to South America, and then left for Germany on 19 December. While sailing home, she suffered a machinery breakdown and had to stop in Portsmouth, Britain, for repairs.

By 5 January 1875, Albatross had reached Kristiansand, Norway, where she received orders to return to Spain. Unbeknownst to Albatross's crew, on 11 December, the Rostock-flagged brig Gustav had put in at Guetaria due to the weather, and Carlist forces had opened fire, prompting the crew to abandon the vessel. Gustav then ran aground and was seized by the Carlist forces, who demanded payment to return the vessel and its cargo. Bismarck immediately demanded a retaliation, and several warships were ordered to Spain, including Albatross and Nautilus. Albatross had to stop in Devonport, Britain, for further repairs to her machinery and hull, which delayed her arrival in Spanish waters until 29 January. She stopped first in Ferrol, where she met Augusta, while Nautilus sailed to Guetaria to negotiate with the Carlists there. The three ships rendezvoused in Santander on 30 January, and the captain of Gustav informed the Germans that the incident was a cause of significant embarrassment for the Carlist leadership. For its part, the Republican government wanted to avoid German military action, and so a negotiated settlement was quickly reached. Albatross and Augusta quickly left for Ferrol to avoid the perception that the Germans planned to attack the Carlists. Albatross returned to Santander on 12 April, and on the 28th, the two sides exchanged salutes, formally ending the incident. Finally on 2 May, the ship departed to return to Germany. She arrived in Kiel on 25 May, where she was decommissioned for a thorough overhaul.

=== Deployment to the Pacific, 1877–1880 ===
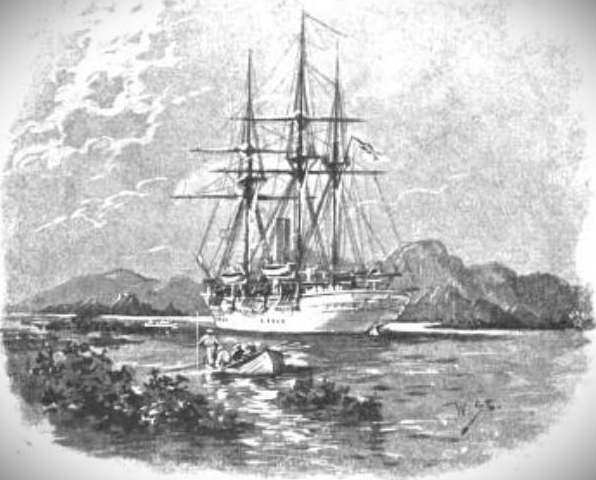
Albatross in the South Pacific

Albatross next recommissioned on 18 August 1877, under the command of KK Franz Mensing. She was ordered to replace Nautilus, which was then stationed in East Asian waters. Albatross left Germany on 4 September, but while en route, she was diverted to Ottoman Palestine to join a squadron of German warships that included the ironclad Kaiser and the frigate Hertha that had been assembled to suppress Muslim attacks on Christians in the region. Albatross stopped in several ports in the country, including Smyrna. On 23 December, she was detached to resume her voyage to the Pacific Ocean. She arrived in Singapore on 7 March 1878, and she formally joined the cruiser squadron in East Asia, which also included Augusta and the gunboat Cyclop. The three ships primarily operated off the coast of Qing China, enforcing trade agreements between the Chinese and German governments, and they operated largely at the direction of the German ambassador, Max von Brandt. As part of these operations, the three ships conducted a naval demonstration off Shanghai from 14 May to 11 June.

While in Nagasaki, Japan, Albatross received orders to sail to the South Pacific on 24 October. The ship then moved to Yokohama, Japan, for periodic maintenance that lasted until 10 November. Albatross took a circuitous route, first sailing east to visit the Hawaiian Kingdom, where she hosted King Kalākaua. Eventually, on 15 January 1879, she anchored in Apia in Samoa; the following day, Ariadne arrived. The Germans signed a commercial treaty with the Samoan government on 24 January. Albatross sailed for the Tonga Islands on 27 February, where a trading agreement was reached on 12 March. She then continued on south to Auckland, New Zealand, for periodic maintenance. While there, Mensing received a telegram instructing him to take the ship back to Apia.

Over the following five months, the ship toured several ports in Samoa, and made another trip to Auckland. On 2 October, Albatross was ordered to return to Germany. She passed through Sydney, Australia, on the way, staying there from 29 October to 22 November. While there, her crew competed in boat races with British and French warship crews in the harbor. Her gig won one of the races, and her cutter came in second to their French counterparts. Also, the crew contributed work parties to help construct Germany's section of the Sydney International Exhibition. The ship thereafter departed, sailed through the Dutch East Indies, crossed the Indian Ocean, and passed through the Red Sea and the Suez Canal. She eventually reached Kiel on 26 April 1880, where she was decommissioned on 12 May for another lengthy overhaul.

=== Third overseas cruise, 1882–1888 ===
Albatross sometime in the 1880s, after conversion to a survey ship

On 1 April 1882, Albatross was recommissioned, under the command of KK Friedrich von Pawelsz. She was initially ordered to sail for South American waters to serve as the station ship in the region. (Note: "Station ship" here refers to the practice of assigning a warship to specific geographical region to be able to respond to crises.) After departing on 19 May, she arrived in the Strait of Magellan to observe the 1882 transit of Venus in company with the screw corvette Moltke. Beginning in 1883, Albatross made a series of visits to Montevideo and Buenos Aires. She also sailed up the Río de la Plata, Uruguay River, and the Paraná River to visit settlements of German immigrants in the area. The ship also cruised along the coast of Brazil and western Patagonia to visit other German settlements there.

On 27 November, Albatross received orders to move back to the south Pacific to serve as the station ship there. She stopped in Montevideo to replace part of her crew for the long voyage, including her captain; KK Max Plüddemann took command of the ship at that time. Albatross then sailed south through the Strait of Magellan, where she conducted several surveys of the area. She stopped in Valparaíso, Chile, and the Marquesas Islands on the way, and eventually anchored off Apia on 30 May 1884. While on the way, the ship was formally reclassified as a cruiser. The next three years on station in the area proved to be very challenging for the crew, who had to mediate disputes between Germans and Samoans, try to enforce German claims in the islands against other foreign rivals, and make repeated, lengthy voyages to Australia or New Zealand for maintenance and exchange crews. In addition to these responsibilities, the crew also had to avoid hurricanes and deal with outbreaks of disease amongst the sailors.

In mid-June 1885, Albatross joined a newly formed Australian Squadron in Sydney, which also included the screw corvettes Stosch and Marie and the gunboat Hyäne. On 20 September, the ship arrived in the Caroline Islands, where the Germans negotiated a treaty of protection with the local government. Her crew assisted in erecting markers and raise the German flag to demonstrate German rule in the islands, and these operations lasted until 18 October. The following month, Kapitänleutnant (KL—Captain Lieutenant) Friedrich von Baudissin took command of the ship. Spain disputed Germany's claim to the Carolines, which ultimately led to an arbitration by Pope Leo XIII, who ruled in 1886 in favor of Spain. On 11 April 1886, Albatross joined the Cruiser Squadron, commanded by Konteradmiral Eduard von Knorr, with the screw corvettes Bismarck, Gneisenau, and Olga. Albatross was sent to the Carolines on 6 June to remove the German flags in accordance with the pope's decision.

In December, KL Ernst von Frantzius relieved Baudissin as the ship's commander. On 15 January 1887, Albatross arrived in Matupi Harbor in Neu-Pommern, where she met the gunboat Adler. On 2 October, Albatross met Adler again in Cooktown, Australia; the exiled Samoan chief Malietoa Laupepa was transferred from Adler to Albatross. Three days later, the ship departed for Germany, carrying Laupepa to Kamerun, where he was being deported. The ship stayed in Kamerun until 22 January 1888, when she resumed the voyage northward. She stopped in several West African ports along the way before arriving in Wilhelmshaven, Germany, on 3 April. She was decommissioned on 17 October for an inspection to determine the state of her hull.

=== Later career ===
The inspection found the ship to be in good condition, despite years of overseas service, and she required only an overhaul before she could be recommissioned. The Admiralty decided to employ the vessel as a survey ship in German waters, and she was classified as a "vessel for special purposes" on 27 November 1888. Albatross was recommissioned on 2 April 1889 and carried out survey work along Germany's North Sea coast until being laid up for the winter on 1 October. This established the pattern for the next nine years of the ship's career: recommissioning in early April and conducting surveys in the North Sea until late September or early October. KL Walther Faber commanded the ship during the 1893 and 1894 service periods, and KL Johannes Merten served as the captain in the 1895 and 1896 commissions. Albatross was decommissioned for the last time on 30 September 1898.

The ship was struck from the naval register on 9 January 1899 and was soon sold to the firm Gebrüder Neugebauer (Neugebauer Brothers) of Hamburg, which had the intention of re-selling the ship to a South American navy. The German government blocked the offer, so the ship was sold to the firm Ihms of Kiel, which removed the ship's sailing rig and engines so she could be used as a lighter. In 1905, the ship was sold to Aktiengesellschaft Vereinigte Bugsier- und Frachtschiffahrtgesellschaft (United Towing and Cargo Shipping Company) of Hamburg, which converted the ship into a coal hulk based in Cuxhaven. She was grounded and destroyed by a storm in March 1906.
