= 15 cm Ring Kanone C/72 =

German siege gun

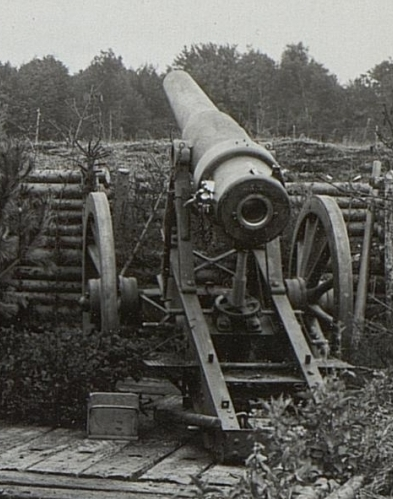
- Type: Fortress gun Siege gun
- Place of origin: German Empire

Service history
- In service: 1872−1918
- Used by: German Empire; Portugal
- Wars: World War I

Production history
- Designer: Krupp
- Designed: 1872
- Manufacturer: Krupp
- Produced: 1872

Specifications
- Mass: Travel: 7,340 kg (16,180 lb); Combat: 4,930 kg (10,870 lb)
- Barrel length: 3.44 m (11 ft 3 in) L/23
- Shell: Separate-loading, bagged charges and projectiles
- Shell weight: 27.7 kg (61 lb 1 oz)
- Caliber: 149.1 mm (5.87 in)
- Breech: Horizontal sliding-block
- Recoil: None
- Carriage: Box trail
- Elevation: -5° to +37°
- Traverse: None
- Rate of fire: 2 rpm
- Muzzle velocity: 485 m/s (1,590 ft/s)
- Maximum firing range: 8 km (5 mi)

The 15 cm Ring Kanone C/72 was a fortress and siege gun developed after the Franco-Prussian War and used by Germany and Portugal before and during World War I.

== History ==
After the Franco-Prussian War, the Army began to study replacements for its cast bronze 15 cm Kanone C/61 and steel 15 cm Kanone C/64 breech loaded cannons. Although Prussian artillery had outclassed their French rivals during the war, the breech mechanism the C/64 used was weak and there was a tendency for barrels to burst due to the premature detonation of shells.

In June 1871, the Artillery Test Commission made a design for a new bronze 15 cm Ring Kanone and carriage for the army. It based its design on experiences gained with the navy's 15 cm RK L/26 and 15 cm RK L/22, which were then under development. The bronze gun was to weigh 3,050 kg and use a charge of 4.5-5 kg of gunpowder. During tests, this bronze gun proved very susceptible to damage from the increased charge. Even while the Artillery Test Commission still hoped to make a suitable gun from Phosphor bronze, it then proposed that a similar cast steel gun of 3,000 kg should be ordered.

In September 1872, the new cast steel gun got the designation 15 cm Ring Kanone C/72. It retained the same 149.1 mm (5.87 in) caliber as the previous gun and was placed in production. The new gun was assigned to the fortress and siege artillery battalions of the Army. Each artillery battery consisted of four guns with four batteries per battalion.

== Characteristics ==
The C/72 was a typical built-up gun constructed of steel with a central rifled tube, reinforcing layers of hoops, and trunnions. The C/72 featured a new breech that, although similar to the breech of the C/64, had a semi-circular face, which allowed the gun to avoid the stress fractures that caused catastrophic failures in its square blocked predecessor. This type of breech was known as a cylindro-prismatic breech, which was a predecessor of Krupp's horizontal sliding-block and the gun used separate-loading, bagged charges and projectiles.

The C/72 was fairly conventional for its time and most nations had similar guns such as its Russian cousin the 6-inch siege gun M1877 or the Italian Cannone da 149/23. Like many of its contemporaries, the C/72 had a tall and narrow box trail carriage built from bolted iron plates with two wooden 12-spoke wheels. The carriages were tall because the guns were designed to sit behind a parapet with the barrel overhanging the front in the fortress artillery role or behind a trench or berm in the siege role. Like its contemporaries, the C/72's carriage did not have a recoil mechanism or a gun shield. However, when used in a fortress, the guns could be connected to an external recoil mechanism, which connected to a steel eye on a concrete firing platform and a hook on the carriage between the wheels. For siege gun use, a wooden firing platform could be assembled ahead of time and the guns could attach to the same type of recoil mechanism. A set of wooden ramps were also placed behind the wheels and when the gun fired the wheels rolled up the ramp and was returned to position by gravity. There was also no traverse so the gun had to be levered into position to aim. A drawback of this system was the gun had to be re-aimed each time, which lowered the rate of fire. For transport, the gun was broken down into two loads 4,560 kg (10,050 lb) and 2,780 kg (6,130 lb) for towing by horse teams or artillery tractors.

== World War I ==
The majority of military planners before the First World War were wedded to the concept of fighting an offensive war of rapid maneuver, which in a time before mechanization meant a focus on cavalry and light horse artillery firing shrapnel shells. Since the C/72 was heavier, and wasn't designed with field use in mind, it was employed as a fortress gun.

Although the majority of combatants had heavy field artillery prior to the outbreak of the First World War, none had adequate numbers of heavy guns in service, nor had they foreseen the growing importance of heavy artillery once the Western Front stagnated and trench warfare set in. The theorists had not foreseen that trenches, barbed wire, and machine guns would rob them of the mobility they had been counting on and like in the Franco-Prussian and Russo-Turkish war the need for high-angle heavy artillery reasserted itself. Since aircraft of the period were not yet capable of carrying large bombs the burden of delivering heavy firepower fell on the artillery. The combatants scrambled to find anything that could fire a heavy shell and that meant emptying the fortresses and scouring the depots for guns held in reserve. It also meant converting coastal artillery and naval guns to siege guns by either giving them simple field carriages or mounting the larger pieces on rail carriages.

A combination of factors led the Germans to issue C/72's to their frontline troops:

- An underestimation of artillery losses during the first two years of the war and an inadequate number of replacement guns being produced.
- Many artillery pieces were neither tall enough or capable of the high-angle fire necessary to fire from entrenched positions.
- Few light field-artillery pieces had the range or fired a large enough projectile to be useful in an indirect fire role.

Although new guns with superior performance were introduced the C/72's remained in service until the end of the war due to the number in service and a lack of replacements. However, their poor range eventually became a handicap.

In 1886, Portugal bought several C/72 artillery pieces and they were still in use by the time the Great War began. They were initially deployed in forts around the city of Lisbon, but during the war they were moved to batteries elsewhere, like in neighboring city of Setúbal and the islands of Azores and Madeira, for coastal defensive duties.

== Photo Gallery ==
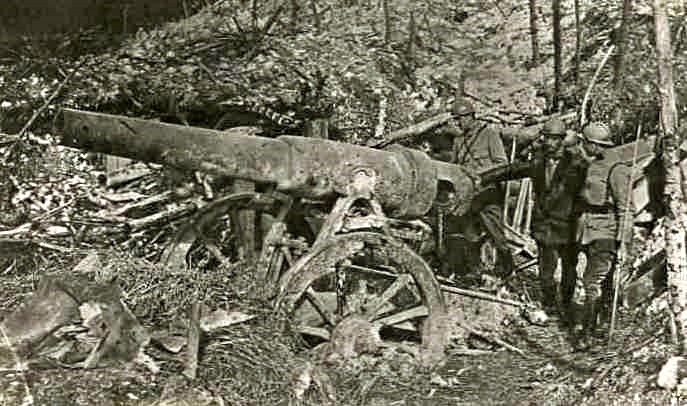
French soldiers with a captured C/72.

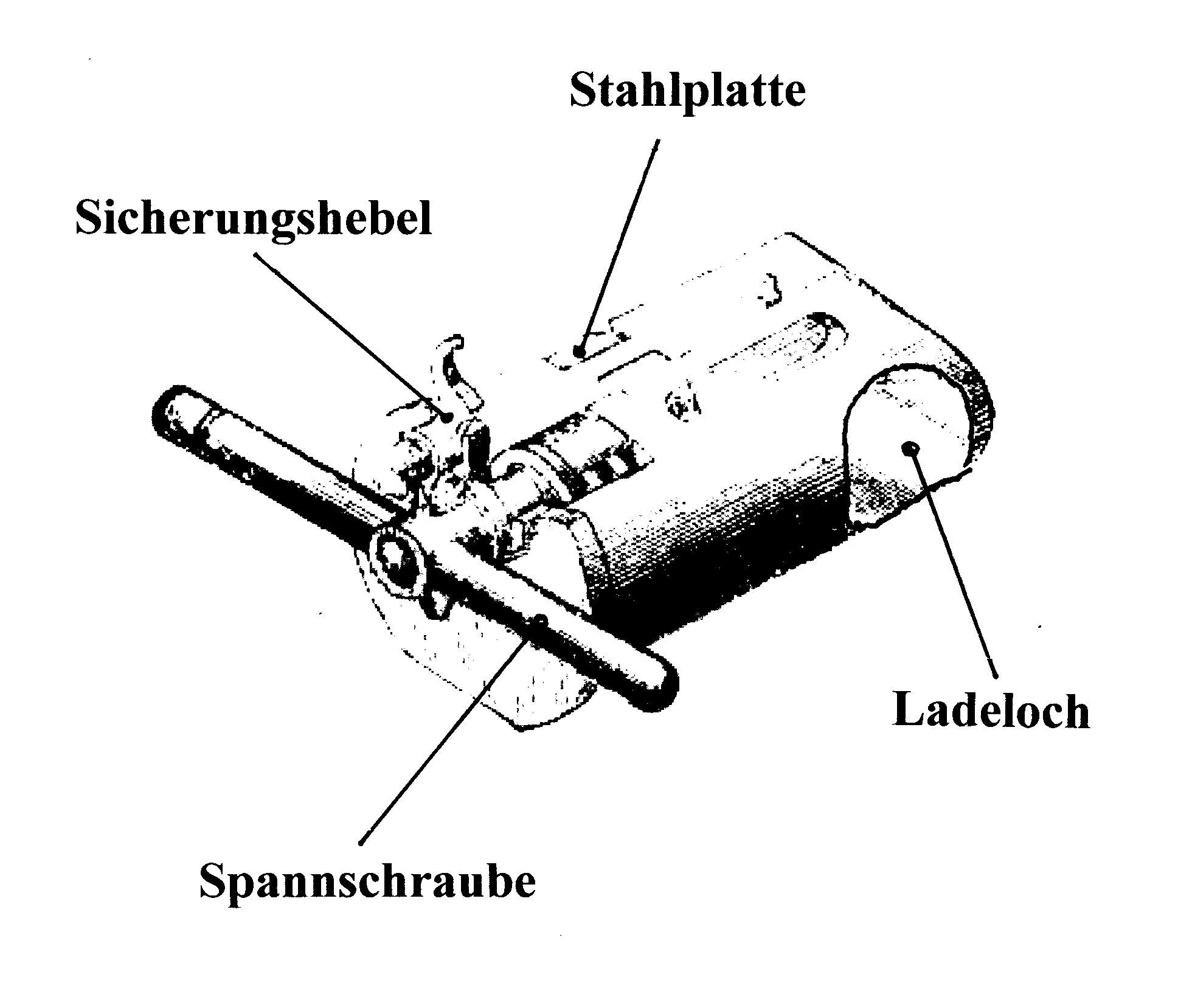
The breech block of the C/72.

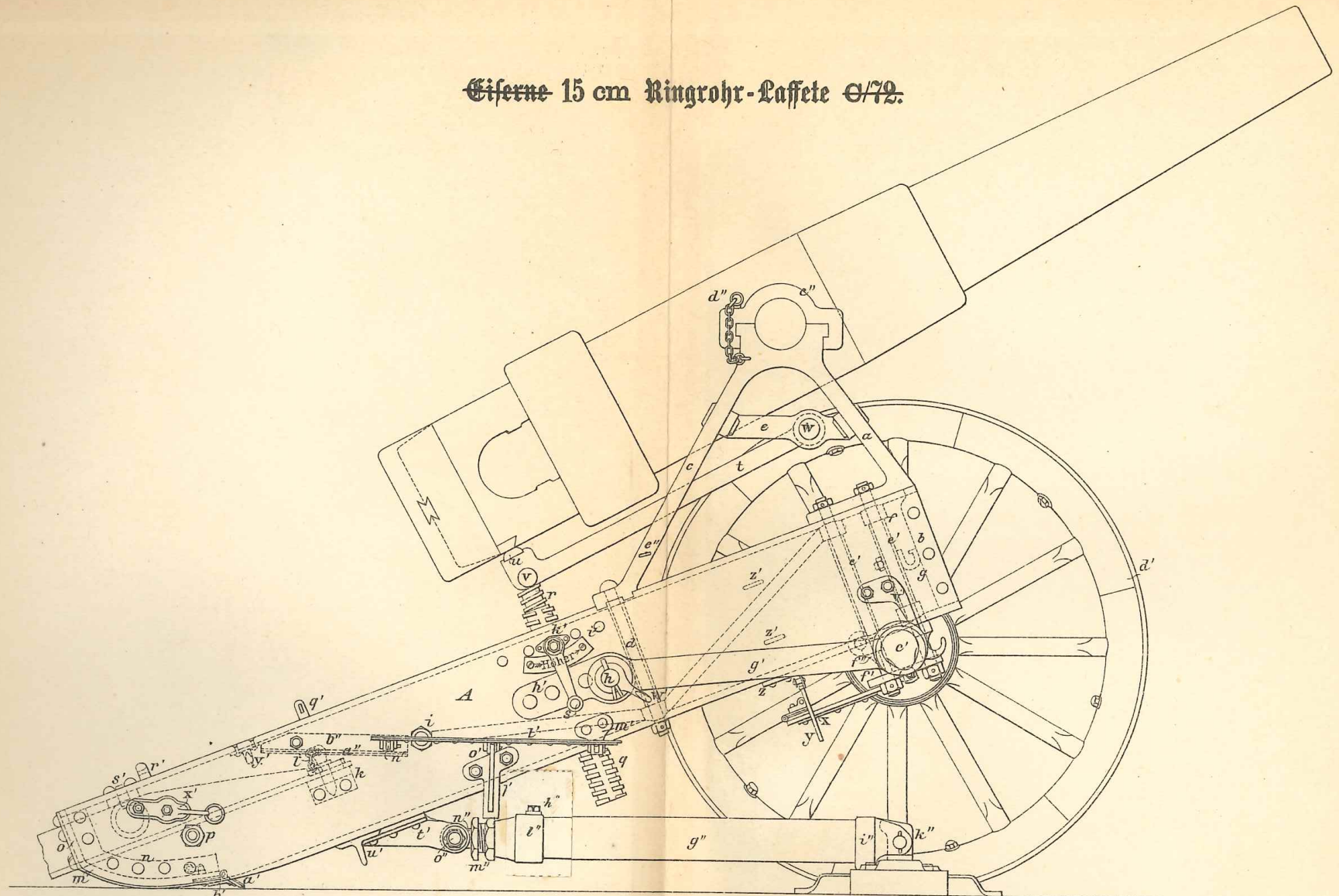
Ringrohr-Lafette from a manual
