= Zentner =

The zentner (German Zentner, from Latin centenarius, derived from centum meaning "hundred") is a name for a unit of mass which was used predominantly in Germany, Austria, and Switzerland, although it was also sometimes used in the United Kingdom – for example, as a measure of the weight of certain crops including hops for beer production – and similar units were used in Scandinavia. Like the notion of hundredweight, the zentner is the weight of 100 units, where the value of the unit depends on the time and location. Traditionally the unit was one hundred pounds (German Pfund) with the precise value being context-dependent, making one zentner equal to about 50 kilograms (110 lb).

In later times, with the adoption of the metric system, the value came to denote exactly 50 kg (110 lb), at least in Germany; in Austria and Switzerland the term is now in use for a measure of 100 kg (220 lb), as it is in Russia (центнер, tsentner). In Germany a measure of 100 kg (220 lb) is named a Doppelzentner.

== See also ==
- German obsolete units of measurement
- Quintal (centner)
