= Built-up gun =

Artillery with a specially reinforced barrel

A built-up gun is artillery with a specially reinforced barrel. An inner tube of metal stretches within its elastic limit under the pressure of confined powder gases to transmit stress to outer cylinders that are under tension. Concentric metal cylinders or wire windings are assembled to minimize the weight required to resist the pressure of powder gases pushing a projectile out of the barrel. Built-up construction was the norm for guns mounted aboard 20th century dreadnoughts and contemporary railway guns, coastal artillery, and siege guns through World War II.

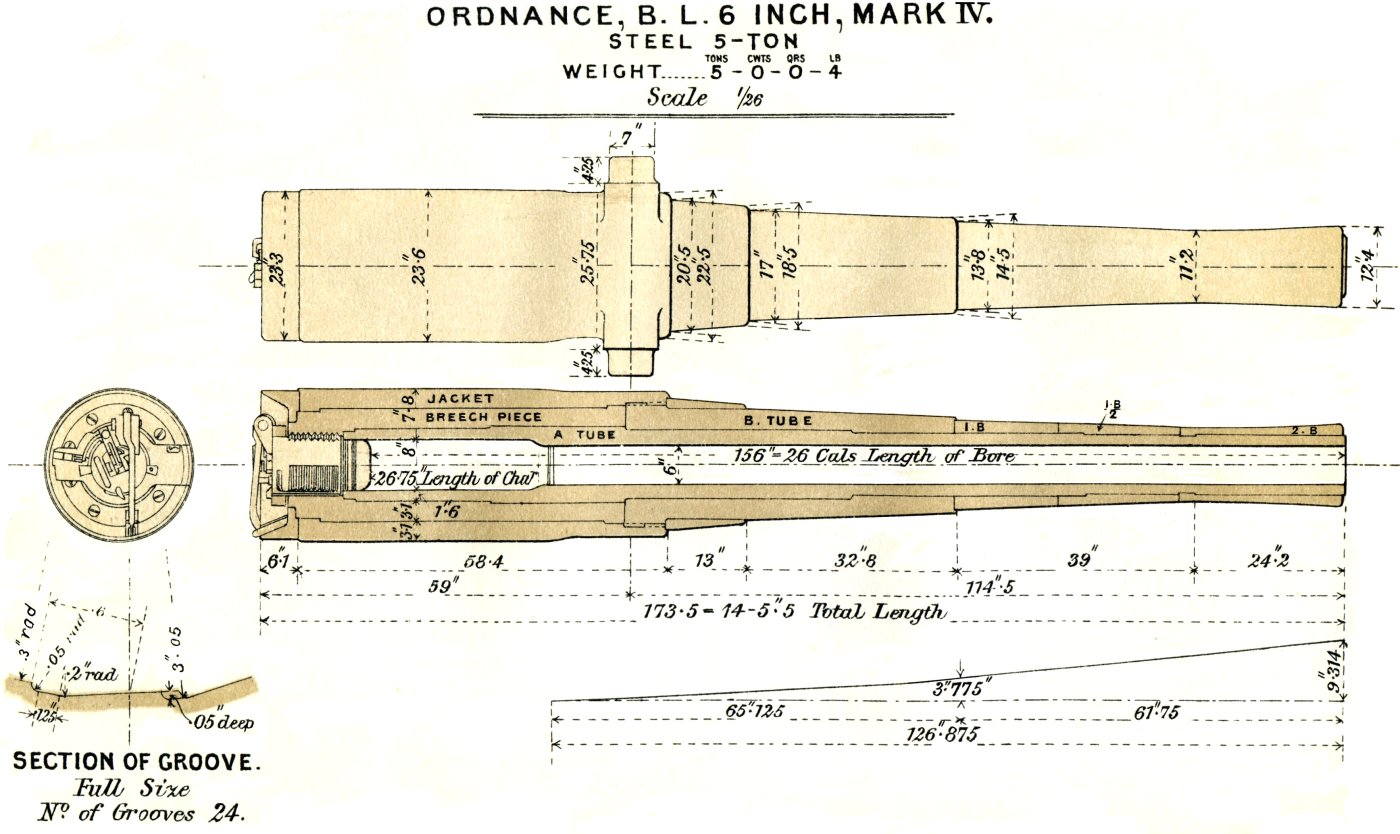
Diagram illustrating arrangement of components of a built-up gun, in this case the British BL 6-inch Mark IV naval gun of the 1880s

== Background ==
The first built-up gun was designed by French artillery officer Alfred Thiéry in 1834 and tested not later than 1840. Also about 1840 another one was made by Daniel Treadwell, and yet another one was produced by Mersey Iron Works in Liverpool according to the John Ericsson's design. Sheffield architector John Frith received a patent on their manufacture in 1843. However, all these guns (whether made from cast iron, wrought iron or their combination) were not technologically practical before the 1850s.

In the 1850s William Armstrong serially produced his rifled breechloaders with the same technology, and built-up, but very simple Parrott rifled muzzleloaders played a significant role in the US Civil War a decade later. Blakely rifles also participated in that war, but on another side. Starting from the 1860s, built-up Krupp guns became a commercial success in Continental Europe.

Velocity and range of artillery vary directly with pressure of gunpowder or smokeless powder gases pushing the shell out of a gun barrel. A gun will deform (or explode) if chamber pressures strain the barrel beyond the elastic limit of the metal from which it is made. Thickness of homogeneous cast iron gun barrels reached a useful limit at approximately one-half caliber. Additional thickness provided little practical benefit, since higher pressures generated cracks from the bore before the outer portion of the cylinder could respond, and those cracks would extend outward during subsequent firings.

By 1870s the technology was widely adopted. Claverino's 1876 treatise on the "Resistance of Hollow Cylinders" was published in Giornale d'Artiglieria. The concept was to give exterior portions of the gun initial tension, gradually decreasing toward the interior, while giving interior parts a normal state of compression by the outer cylinders and wire windings. Theoretical maximum performance would be achieved if the inner cylinder forming the rifled bore were compressed to its elastic limit by surrounding elements while at rest before firing, and expanded to its elastic limit by internal gas pressure during firing.

== Nomenclature ==
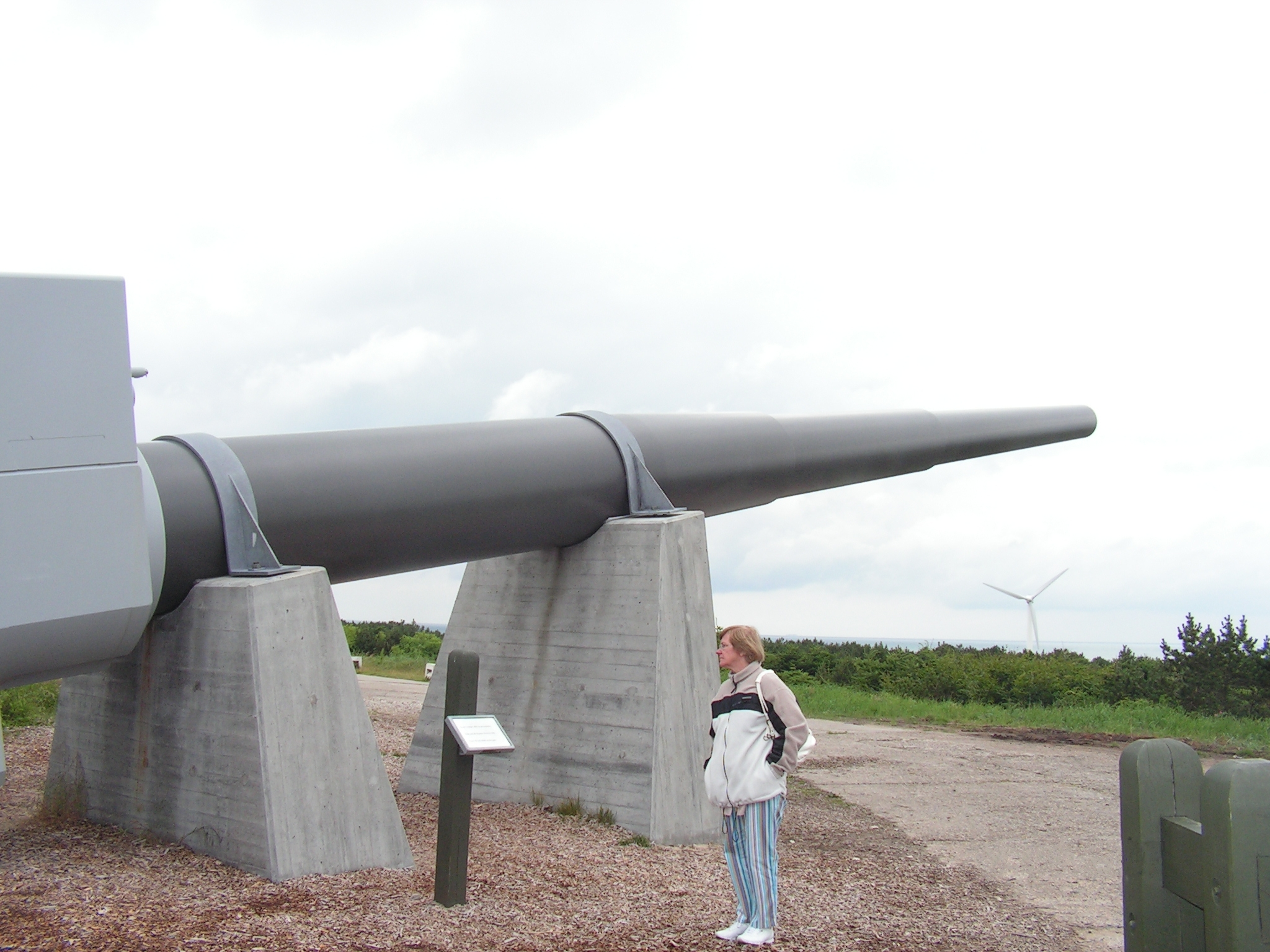
Abrupt diameter change steps on the tapered chase indicate the forward extent of external tensioned cylinders.

The innermost cylinder forming the chamber and rifled bore is called a tube or, with certain construction techniques, a liner. A second layer cylinder called the jacket extends rearward past the chamber to house the breechblock. The jacket usually extends forward through the areas of highest pressure, through the recoil slide, and may extend all the way to the muzzle. The forward part of the barrel may be tapered toward the muzzle because less strength is required for reduced pressures as the projectile approaches it. This tapered portion of barrel is called the chase. Very large guns sometimes use shorter outer cylinders called hoops when manufacturing limitations make full length jackets impractical. Hoops forward of the slide are called chase hoops. The jacket or forward chase hoop may be flared outward in the form of a bell at the muzzle for extra strength to reduce splitting because the metal at that point is not supported on the forward end. As many as four or five layers, or hoop courses, of successively tensioned cylinders have been used. Layers are designated alphabetically as the "A" tube enclosed by the "B" jacket and chase hoops, enclosed by the "C" hoop course, enclosed by the "D" hoop course, etc. Individual hoops within a course are numbered from the breech forward as the B1 jacket, the B2 chase hoop, and then the C1 jacket hoop, the C2 hoop etc. Successive hoop course joints are typically staggered and individual hoop courses use lap joints in preference to butt joints to minimize the weakness of joint locations. Cylinder diameter may be varied by including machined shoulders to prevent forward longitudinal movement of an inner cylinder within an outer cylinder during firing. Shoulder locations are similarly staggered to minimize weakness.

== Assembly procedure ==
After the tube, jacket, and hoops have been machined to appropriate dimensions, the jacket is carefully heated to approximately 400 degrees Celsius (800 degrees Fahrenheit) in a vertical air furnace so thermal expansion allows the cool tube to be lowered into place. When the jacket is in position, it is cooled to form a tensioned shrink fit over the tube. Then the next hoop (either B2 or C1) is similarly heated so the assembled A tube and B1 jacket can be lowered into position for a successive shrink fit. The assembled unit may be machined prior to fitting a new hoop. The process continues as remaining tubes are heated sequentially and cooled onto the built-up unit until all elements have been assembled. When tensioned wire winding is used in place of a hoop course, the wire is typically covered by an outer tensioned cylinder also called a jacket.

== Liners ==
Burning powder gases melt part of the bore each time a gun is fired. This melted metal is oxidized or blown out of the muzzle until the barrel is eroded to the extent shell dispersion becomes unacceptable. After firing several hundred shells, a gun may be reconditioned by boring out the interior and inserting a new liner as the interior cylinder. Exterior cylinders are heated as a unit to approximately 200 degrees Celsius (400 degrees Fahrenheit) to allow insertion of a new liner and the liner is bored and rifled after installation. A new liner may be bored for a different projectile diameter than used in the original gun. Liners may be either cylindrical or conical. Conical liners are tapered toward the muzzle for ease of removal from the breech end while limiting forward creep during firing. Conical liners may be removed by water cooling the liner after re-heating the barrel, but cylindrical liners must be bored out.

== Monoblock guns ==
With the obsolescence of very large guns following World War II, metallurgical advances encouraged use of monoblock (one-piece) construction for postwar guns of medium caliber. In a procedure called autofrettage, a bored monoblock tube is filled with hydraulic fluid at pressures higher than the finished gun will experience during firing. Upon release of hydraulic pressure, the internal diameter of the monoblock tube will have been increased by approximately 6%. The outer portion of the finished monoblock rebounds to approximately its original diameter and exerts compressive forces on the inner portion similar to the separate cylinders of a built-up gun.

== See also ==
- Hoop gun
