= Carola-class corvette =

Screw corvette class of the German Imperial Navy

- Carola and Olga in Hong Kong in the 1880s

Class overview
- Builders: AG Vulcan; Kaiserliche Werft Danzig; Kaiserliche Werft Kiel; Reiherstieg AG
- Operators: Imperial German Navy
- Preceded by: Bismarck class
- Succeeded by: SMS Nixe
- Built: 1879–1886
- In commission: 1881–1905
- Planned: 6
- Completed: 6
- Scrapped: 6

General characteristics
- Type: Screw corvette
- Displacement: Full load: 2,424 t (2,386 long tons)
- Length: 76.35 m (250 ft 6 in)
- Beam: 12.5 m (41 ft)
- Draft: 4.98 m (16 ft 4 in)
- Installed power: 8 × fire-tube boilers; 2,367 metric horsepower (2,335 ihp)
- Propulsion: 1 × screw propeller; 1 × double-expansion steam engine
- Sail plan: Barque rig
- Speed: 13.7 knots (25.4 km/h; 15.8 mph)
- Range: 3,420 nautical miles (6,330 km; 3,940 mi) at 10 knots (19 km/h; 12 mph)
- Crew: 10 officers; 246 enlisted men
- Armament: 10 × 15 cm (5.9 in) guns; 2 × 8.7 cm (3.4 in) guns; 6 × 37 mm (1.5 in) Hotchkiss revolver cannon
- Notes: Figures are for Carola; the other members of the class varied in some details

The Carola class was a group of six screw corvettes built by the German Kaiserliche Marine in the late 1870s and 1880s. The class comprised Carola, the lead ship, Olga, Marie, Sophie, Alexandrine, and Arcona. They were ordered to replace older sailing vessels that were no longer sufficient to protect German interests around the world. Intended for service in the German colonial empire, the ships were designed with a combination of steam and sail power for extended cruising range, and they were equipped with a battery of ten 15-centimeter (5.9 in) guns. Relying primarily on sail power for their long-range deployments, the ships were obsolescent before construction began.

The six ships were all sent on lengthy overseas deployments throughout their careers, with assignments to Germany's colonial holdings in Africa—Togo, German South West Africa and German East Africa—and in the Pacific, German New Guinea and later the Jiaozhou Bay Leased Territory. They were frequently used to suppress local uprisings against German rule, punish those who attacked German citizens or businesses, and show the flag. On several occasions, ships of the class were badly damaged in accidents—Marie running aground off New Mecklenburg and Sophie being rammed by a merchant vessel, both in 1884, and Olga being forced ashore by a cyclone in 1889—but none of the members of the class were lost.

Several of the corvettes were used for training purposes, taking part in fleet exercises, extended training cruises with naval cadets, and in the case of Carola and Olga later in their careers, as dedicated gunnery training ships. No longer useful as cruising warships by the 1890s, all of the ships of the Carola class were withdrawn from active service by the end of the decade. Some were used for training purposes, but Alexandrine was too worn out from her years abroad to permit further use, Marie was too expensive to convert into a training ship, and Sophie was instead used as a barracks ship. Between 1904 and 1908, all of the Carola-class corvettes were broken up for scrap, with the exception of Sophie, which lingered on as a floating barracks until she too went to the breakers in 1920.

== Design ==
As German commercial interests began to expand to overseas markets in Asia and the Pacific in the 1870s, the need for long-range cruising warships became increasingly severe, particularly as other European powers started to exclude German businesses from activity abroad. By the mid-1870s, the fleet of corvettes available to the German Kaiserliche Marine (Imperial Navy) was rapidly ageing, with several vessels already twenty years old. At the time, the world's navies were grappling with the development of steam power, which had already replaced sails in large ironclad warships. Cruising vessels required a much longer radius of action than the ironclads, and steam engines were not yet reliable or efficient enough to rely on them alone, necessitating the retention of traditional sailing rigs.

In 1875, the design for a new class of screw corvettes was prepared, and six ships were ordered, the last two to a modified design. The design for the Carola class was based on the preceding Bismarck-class corvettes, though they were reduced in size. Despite the fact that they were intended to modernize the German cruising fleet, their design was obsolescent before construction even began, capable of engaging only similar vessels. Nevertheless, the Carola-class corvettes and the other cruisers available succeeded in expanding Germany's colonial empire, particularly in the central Pacific in the 1880s and 1890s.

=== General characteristics ===
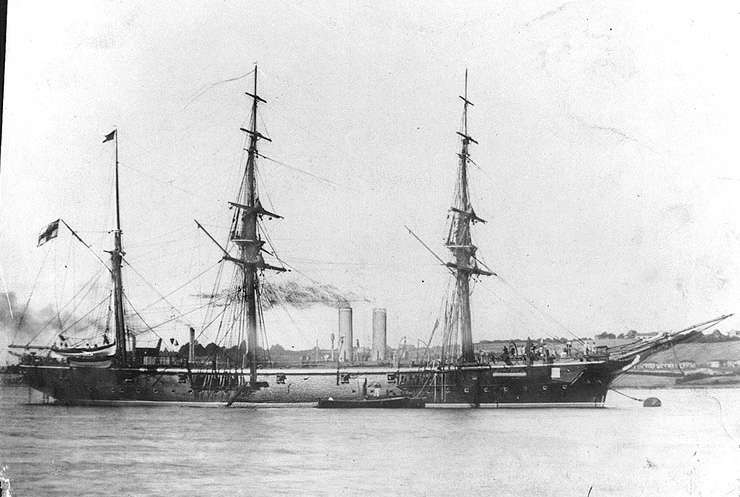
Olga in the 1880s

The first four ships of the Carola class were 70.6 meters (231 ft 8 in) long at the waterline and 76.35 m (250 ft 6 in) long overall, with a beam of 12.5 m (41 ft) and a draft of 4.98 m (16 ft 4 in) forward. The last two ships, Alexandrine and Arcona, were slightly larger, at 71.8 m (235 ft 7 in) at the waterline and 81.2 m (266 ft 5 in) overall, with a beam of 12.6 m (41 ft 4 in) and a draft of 5 m (16 ft 5 in) forward. The first four ships displaced 2,147 metric tons (2,113 long tons) as designed and 2,424 metric tons (2,386 long tons) at full load, and the larger vessels displaced 2,361 metric tons (2,324 long tons) as designed and 2,662 metric tons (2,620 long tons) fully laden.

The ships' hulls were constructed with iron frames that provided the structure for the wood hull planks, over which a layer of zinc was applied to protect the wood from biofouling. Alexandrine and Arcona received copper sheathing instead of zinc. The stem and sternpost were also iron, except for the last two vessels, which had bronze sternposts. The first four vessels had nine watertight compartments, while the last two had eleven; all six ships had a double bottom under the engine room.

Steering was controlled with a single rudder, and all six ships maneuvered well under steam, and better under sail. They rolled and pitched badly and lost significant speed in a head sea, though they handled well in bad weather. Sophie and Marie had a crew that consisted of 25 officers and 244 enlisted men, though as school ships their crews were reduced to 13 officers and 135 enlisted, which left room for 150 cadets aboard each vessel. Carola had a complement of 10 officers and 244 enlisted, while Olga had 10 officers and 265 enlisted. Alexandrine and Arcona each had a crew of 25 officers and 257 enlisted. Each corvette carried several smaller boats; Carola and Olga had two picket boats, two cutters, two yawls, and one dinghy, while the other four vessels each had one picket boat, one launch, two cutters, two yawls, and two dinghies.

=== Machinery ===
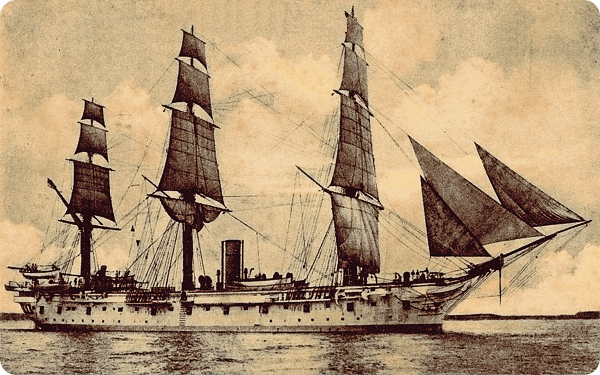
Marie under sail

Carola and Olga were powered by a single horizontal, 3-cylinder, double-expansion steam engine that drove one 2-bladed screw propeller that was 5.02 m (16 ft 6 in) wide in diameter. Steam was provided by eight coal-fired fire-tube boilers, which were ducted into two funnels. Marie and Sophie had a 2-cylinder steam engine, with a propeller that was 4.7 m (15 ft 5 in) wide, and they had two fewer boilers and only one funnel. Alexandrine and Arcona had two engines and eight boilers, and both vessels had two funnels. Electricity was provided by one generator that produced 2 kilowatts (2.7 hp) at 55 volts. Each vessel had a capacity for 340 to 350 metric tons (330 to 340 long tons; 370 to 390 short tons) of coal storage for the boilers.

The first four ships had a designed speed of 13.5 knots (25.0 km/h; 15.5 mph) under steam from 2,100 indicated horsepower (1,600 kW), though they all exceeded those figures. Carola, the slowest ship of the class, reached a top speed of 13.7 knots (25.4 km/h; 15.8 mph), while Marie and Sophie both made 14 knots (26 km/h; 16 mph). Alexandrine and Arcona, with their additional engine, were rated for 14 knots from 2,400 ihp (1,800 kW); the former achieved her designed speed and the latter exceeded it slightly, reaching 14.1 knots (26.1 km/h; 16.2 mph) on speed trials. The first four ships had a cruising radius of 3,420 nautical miles (6,330 km; 3,940 mi) at a speed of 10 knots (19 km/h; 12 mph).

The ships were equipped with a three-masted barque rig with a surface area of 1,134 to 1,230 square meters (12,210 to 13,240 sq ft) to supplement their steam engines on their long deployments abroad, where coal might be scarce. After they were converted into gunnery training ships, Carola and Olga had their sailing rig removed, and they received heavy military masts with fighting tops for light weapons.

=== Armament ===
The ships of the Carola class were armed with a battery of ten 15 cm (5.9 in) 22-caliber (cal.) breech-loading guns, which were supplied with a total of 1,000 rounds of ammunition. The guns had a range of 5,000 m (5,500 yd). They also carried two 8.7 cm (3.4 in) 24-cal. guns with 200 rounds of ammunition and six 37 mm (1.5 in) Hotchkiss revolver cannon. Alexandrine and Arcona had newer 30-cal. versions of the 15 cm guns, which had a range of 6,800 m (7,400 yd), and were supplied with 730 shells. They also carried four 10.5 cm (4.1 in) 35-cal. guns with 400 rounds; these guns had a range of 7,300 m (8,000 yd). Like their sisters, they also had six revolver cannon.

For Carola, which was converted into a gunnery training ship in the early 1890s, the 15 cm guns were later reduced to six and then four guns, and the 8.7 cm guns were replaced by a pair of 10.5 cm SK L/35 guns, eight 8.8 cm (3.5 in) SK L/30 guns, and two 5 cm (2.0 in) SK L/40 guns. As converted as a gunnery training ship for automatic weapons, Olga later carried just two 8.8 cm guns and ten 3.7 cm machine cannon of unrecorded type.

== Ships ==
Construction data
Ship	Builder	Laid down	Launched	Completed
Carola	AG Vulcan, Stettin	1879	27 November 1880	1 September 1881
Olga	AG Vulcan, Stettin	1879	11 December 1880	9 January 1882
Marie	Reiherstieg AG, Hamburg	1880	20 August 1881	1 May 1883
Sophie	Kaiserliche Werft, Danzig	January 1880	10 November 1881	10 August 1882
Alexandrine	Kaiserliche Werft, Kiel	February 1882	7 February 1885	6 October 1886
Arcona	Kaiserliche Werft, Danzig	1881	7 May 1885	1 December 1886

== Service history ==
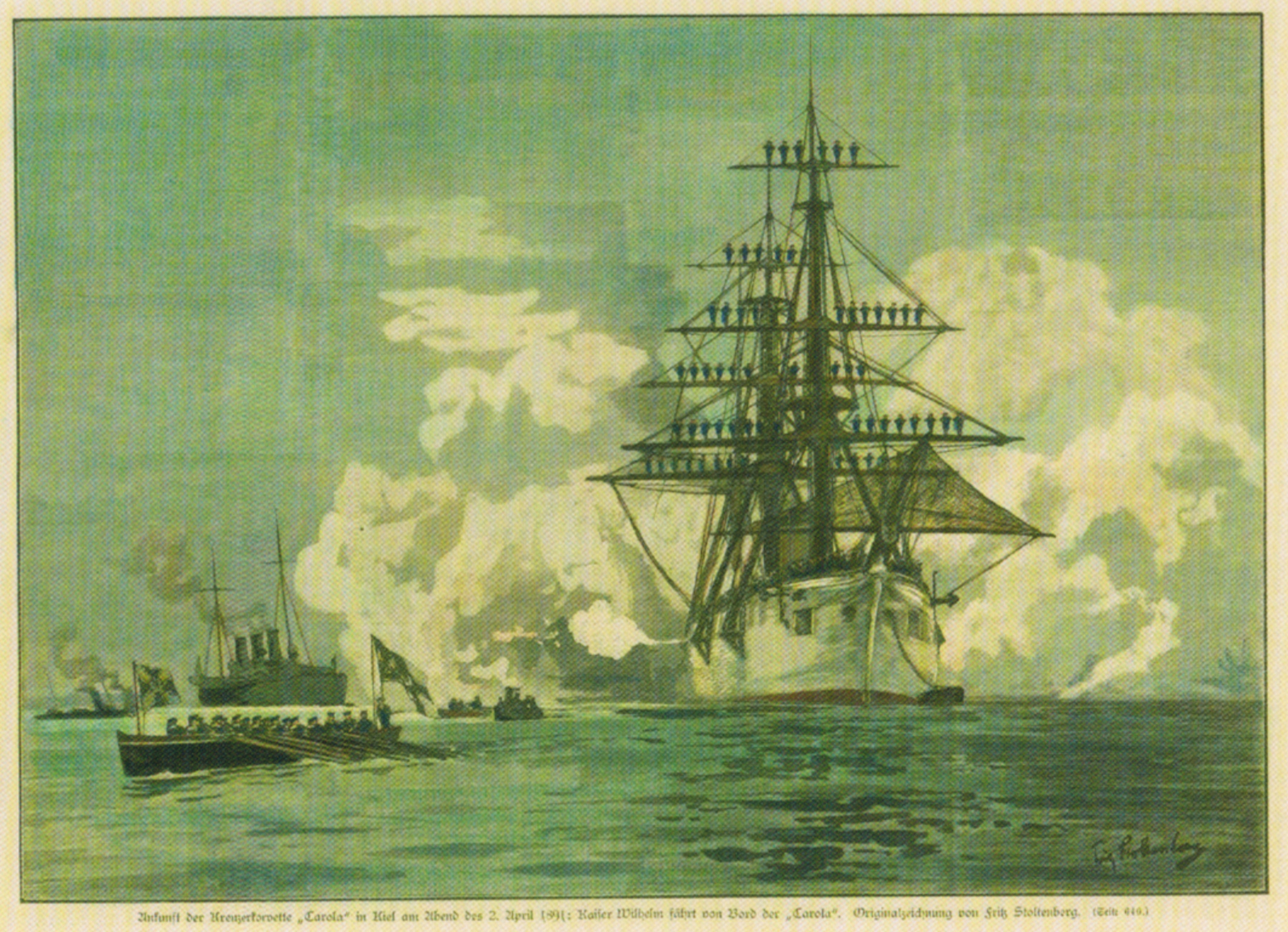
A painting of Carola arriving in Kiel in 1891 by Fritz Stoltenberg

=== Carola ===
Carola, named for Carola of Saxony, was sent on two major overseas deployments during her career. The first came immediately after entering service in 1881 and lasted into 1883. She went to the central Pacific Ocean to protect German interests in Samoa and Melanesia, and later went to southern Africa, and was the first German warship to reach what would become German Southwest Africa. While in the Pacific, she conducted a punitive operation against locals in the Hermit Islands who had murdered a pair of German citizens and nine locals who had worked for them. While at the island of Buka in 1883, her crew named a previously unused harbor "Queen Carola Harbor", after their vessel's namesake. After returning to Germany in 1883, she was laid up until 1886, during which time she received a torpedo tube.

Her second deployment came in 1886 and saw Carola alternate between German East Africa and the Pacific as part of a cruising squadron commanded by Eduard von Knorr, Karl Eduard Heusner, and later Karl August Deinhard. The squadron's time in the Pacific was uneventful, and consisted of visiting ports in East Asia and patrolling Germany's holdings in the central Pacific in German New Guinea. During operations off East Africa from 1888 to 1890, she participated in anti-slave trade operations, which included the capture of a dhow carrying 78 slaves that were freed. She also helped suppress the Abushiri revolt, sending marines ashore to fight the rebels and providing gunfire support to German forces led by Major Hermann Wissmann.

After returning to Germany in 1891, Carola was converted into a gunnery training ship, as she was by then obsolete as a warship. She served in this capacity, in company with the training ship Mars and Olga through the 1890s and early 1900s, with this duty being interrupted in 1897, when she was used as a target ship. Carola was decommissioned in 1905, sold the following year, and broken up for scrap in Hamburg.

=== Olga ===
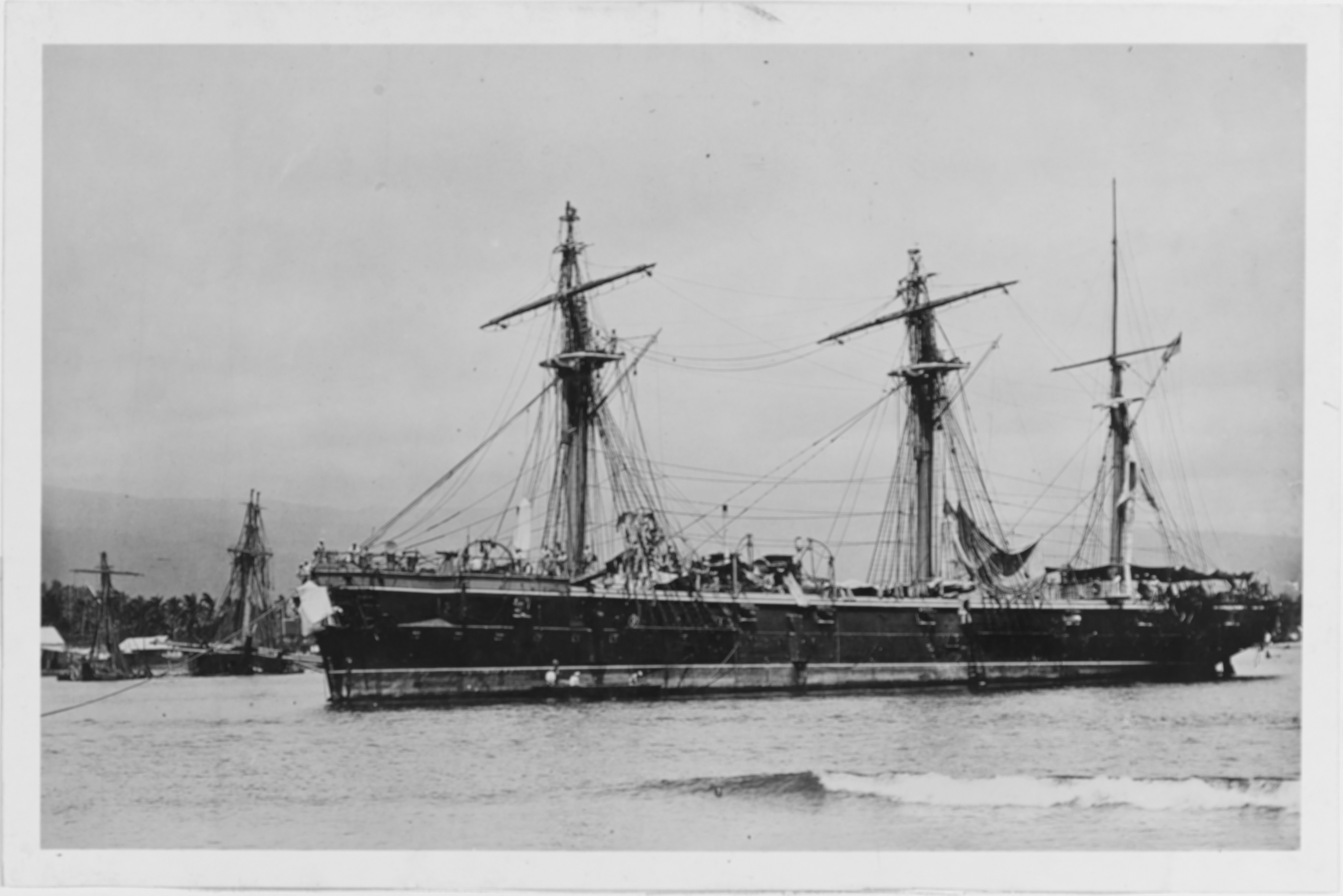
Olga aground in Apia harbor following the 1889 Apia cyclone

In the course of her career, Olga was sent abroad on three major deployments. The first, uneventful voyage came in 1882, and took the vessel to South American waters to show the flag for a year and a half. During the cruise, Prince Heinrich of Prussia served aboard the ship. The second cruise came shortly thereafter, when unrest in the German colony of Kamerun necessitated the formation of a West African Squadron to suppress it. Olga and three other corvettes send marines ashore to battle local forces resisting German rule. After defeating the rebellion, Olga returned to Germany in 1885, and she thereafter served as a training ship, though this activity lasted only a few months before she was again ordered abroad.

Her third cruise began in September 1885, and initially saw the ship sent to German East Africa to join the cruising squadron. She was tasked with patrolling the coast of the German protectorate of Wituland; she also forced the extradition of two locals who had murdered a German explorer. In 1887, the squadron was sent to the Pacific, and Olga arrived in Samoa in August that year. She sent men ashore to fight Samoan rebels opposed to the German-backed government in the First Battle of Vailele. While in the harbor at Apia in 1889, Olga was badly damaged by a powerful cyclone and was forced to leave the station for repairs; two other German vessels were destroyed by the storm, but Olga's crew were able to salvage the ship.

From 1890, Olga saw limited service in a variety of subsidiary roles. She was used as a training ship from 1893 to 1897, when she was transferred to the Fishery School. She conducted an extensive survey in Spitzbergen in 1898 before being decommissioned late in the year, to be converted into a gunnery training ship. She served in that capacity until 1905, when she was stricken from the naval register. Olga was sold for scrap the following year and was broken up in Hamburg in 1908.

=== Marie ===
SMS Marie, probably in Wilhelmshaven in the mid-1880s

Marie was sent abroad immediately after entering service, initially to South America, where she picked up the German participants of the first International Polar Year at South Georgia Island. After observing the aftermath of the War of the Pacific between Bolivia, Chile, and Peru in late 1883 and early 1884, she was transferred to German New Guinea, where she was tasked with supporting Germany's growing overseas empire in the region. Her deployment to the central Pacific was cut short when she accidentally ran aground off New Mecklenburg and was badly damaged, necessitating a return to Germany for extensive repairs. She was thereafter laid up for the remainder of the decade.

The ship was reactivated for a second overseas tour in 1892. She was first sent to Chile protect German nationals in the aftermath of the Chilean Civil War of 1891, before joining Alexandrine and Arcona off Brazil in 1893 in response to the Revolta da Armada (Revolt of the Fleet) there. After they ensured that German interests in Brazil were safe, the three ships were then sent to East Asia in April 1894, where they formed the nucleus of the East Asia Division, and were tasked with protecting German nationals in China during the First Sino-Japanese War.

Marie was recalled to Germany in mid-1895, as she had been replaced by a newer and more capable protected cruiser, SMS Prinzess Wilhelm. Marie and stopped in Morocco on the way back to enforce a settlement over the murder of two German citizens. After reaching Germany in September 1895, she was decommissioned. Later assigned to the reserve training unit, she was never activated for the role, since the navy had determined it would be too expensive to return Marie to service. Instead, she was eventually stricken from the naval register in 1904 and sold for scrap three years later.

=== Sophie ===
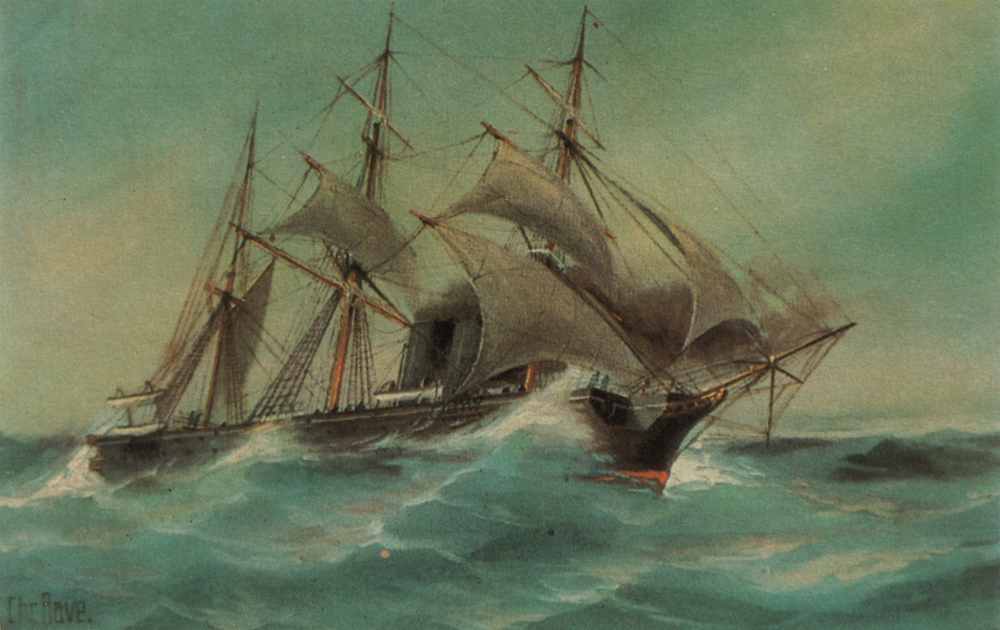
An old postcard of Sophie, featuring a painting of the ship by Christopher Rave

Sophie was sent abroad in 1883, first to escort Crown Prince Friedrich Wilhelm on a visit to Spain. She then went to western Africa to protect German nationals in Togo before Germany had declared a protectorate in the country. The ship's commander exceeded his orders, which instructed him to avoid direct conflict with local rulers, though he successfully negotiated agreements that protected German citizens in the area and arrested hostile chiefs. Sophie then returned home and was tasked with training duties, serving as the flagship of the training squadron. During exercises in September 1884, she was rammed and badly damaged by a steam ship. She returned to service after lengthy repairs, and in 1885 and 1886, went on extended training cruises, the first to the West Indies and the second to Spain.

While on the second cruise, she was ordered to join the cruiser squadron Germany maintained to respond to crises around the world. She patrolled German colonial holdings in German East Africa and German New Guinea from 1886 to 1892. During this period, she helped to secure East Africa, sending landing parties ashore in Dar es Salaam, Windi, and the Kingani river delta and blockading the coast. While in the Pacific station, she conducted punitive expeditions against locals who had attacked Germans and cruised the Chinese coast with the corvette Leipzig. In 1891, Sophie and Leipzig sailed to Chile join Alexandrine in defending Germans during the civil war in the country, which included landing marines in Valparaíso.

In April 1892, the three ships continued on to East Africa, but Sophie's stay there was short-lived, as she was recalled to Germany in June and was decommissioned shortly after her arrival. Sophie was converted into a dedicated training ship between 1895 and 1898, entering service in that role in January 1898. This duty lasted for only a year before she was withdrawn in March 1899, having been replaced by the larger corvette Gneisenau. She ended her career as a barracks ship, including at the German base in Helgoland during the first two years of World War I, ultimately being sold in 1920 and broken up the following year.

=== Alexandrine ===
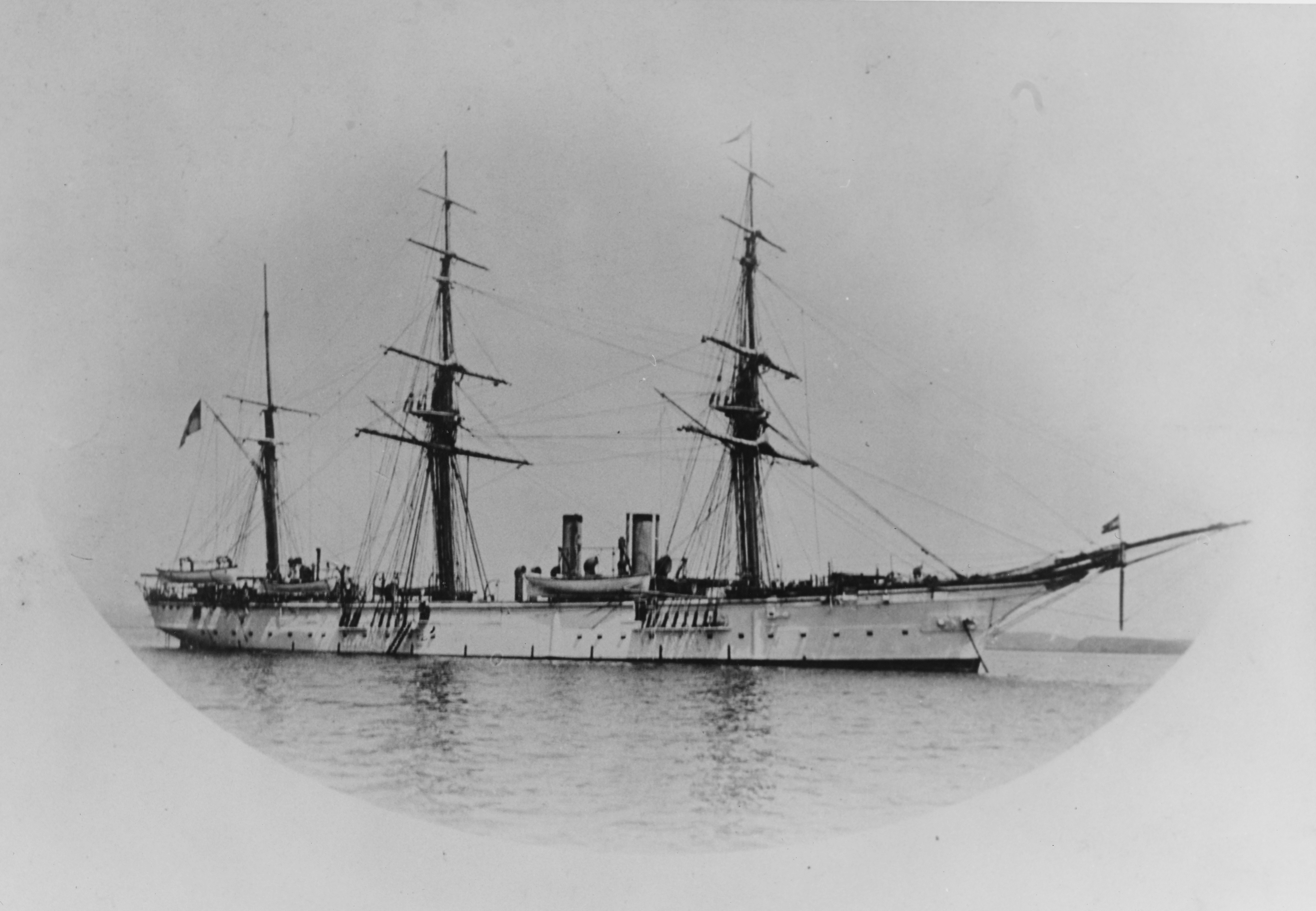
Alexandrine sometime c. 1886–1895

Alexandrine was laid up for several years after completion; at the time, the German navy had a plan whereby Germany's colonies would be protected by gunboats, while larger warships would generally be kept in reserve, with a handful assigned to a flying squadron that could respond to crises quickly. Alexandrine was first activated in 1889 for a deployment to the central Pacific to reinforce the gunboats on station there. Competing claims to the islands of Samoa created tension between Germany, Britain, and the United States, necessitating a larger warship to enforce Germany's claims to the islands. The ship patrolled German New Guinea until 1891, protecting German interests in the region and punishing locals who attacked Germans in the islands. In 1891, she joined the cruiser squadron, which also included Marie.

The ships were sent to Chile to protect German nationals during the Chilean Civil War that year; while on the way, the squadron flagship, Leipzig, ran out of coal and Alexandrine had to take her under tow. The squadron thereafter cruised off East Asia in 1892, and by the end of the year, went to German East Africa. In 1893, she was sent to Brazil where the Revolta da Armada in that country threatened German interests. While in Brazil, an outbreak of Yellow fever spread to the ship, forcing her to go into quarantine. After the Brazilian government suppressed the rebellion, Alexandrine and the other ships were then sent back to East Asia to monitor the First Sino-Japanese War.

In March 1895, Alexandrine was recalled to Germany, and while she was en route, she stopped in Morocco to pressure local authorities into paying reparations for the murder of two German citizens. On her arrival in Germany she went into dry dock to be inspected, and it was found that her hull had badly deteriorated after several years abroad. As a result, she was decommissioned in June 1895. She did not see further active service, being used only as a floating battery in Danzig from 1904 to 1907. That year, she was stricken from the naval register, sold and used temporarily as a floating workshop, and then broken up later in 1907.

=== Arcona ===
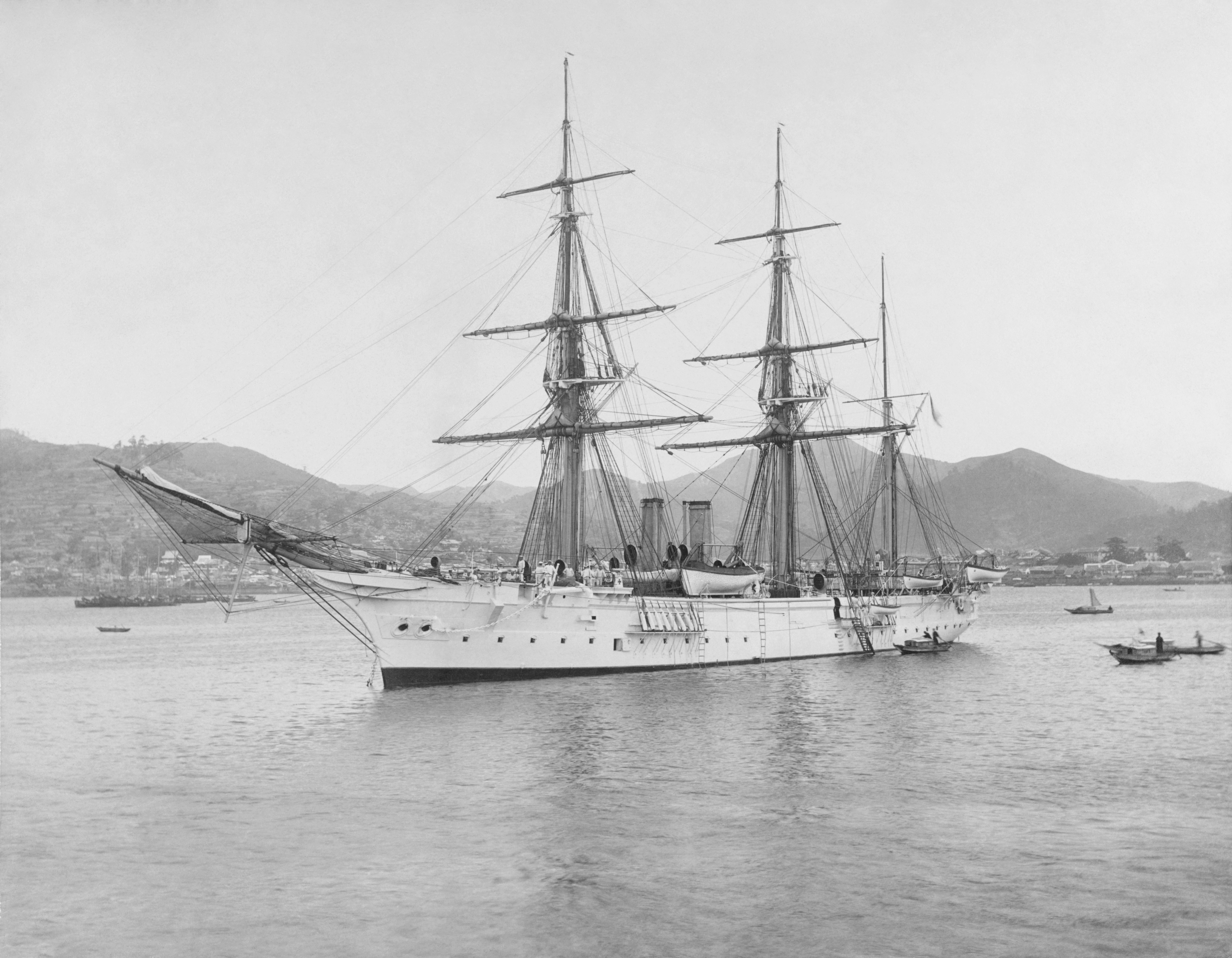
Arcona in Nagasaki, 1897

Like Alexandrine, Arcona was kept in reserve after completion until 1892, when she was activated for an extended deployment abroad. She protected German interests in Venezuela in 1892 during unrest in the country, and her presence forced the Venezuelan government to issue an apology for attacks against German citizens in Macuto. She joined the overseas cruiser squadron in German East Africa the following year; while in African waters, she went to German South West Africa to carry field guns to strengthen the local Schutztruppe (Protection force). Later in 1893, she was sent to Brazil when a naval revolt threatened German nationals in the country. There, she joined Marie and Alexandrine.

The outbreak of the First Sino-Japanese War in 1894 prompted the transfer of Arcona and two of her sister ships to East Asia as the nucleus of the East Asia Division. Arcona served as the divisional flagship until early 1895, when she was replaced by the protected cruiser Irene. Arcona and the rest of the division remained off China in the aftermath of the Sino-Japanese War to protect Europeans against riots directed at foreigners. The ship was under repair when Otto von Diederichs seized the Jiaozhou Bay Leased Territory in China with the rest of the Division in 1897, and was therefore unable to participate in the operation, though she later assisted in defending the concession.

Arcona then conducted survey cruises in the central Pacific Ocean and protected German nationals in the Philippines after the Spanish–American War in 1898. She was also sent on a punitive mission against the island of Pohnpei, where a German merchant sailor had been murdered. In early 1899, she was recalled to Germany and was decommissioned in June. She was renamed Mercur in January 1902 to free her name for the new light cruiser Arcona. Mercur was reclassified as a miscellaneous harbor ship later that year, and she was ultimately broken up in 1906.
