= SMS Marie =

Screw corvette of the German Imperial Navy

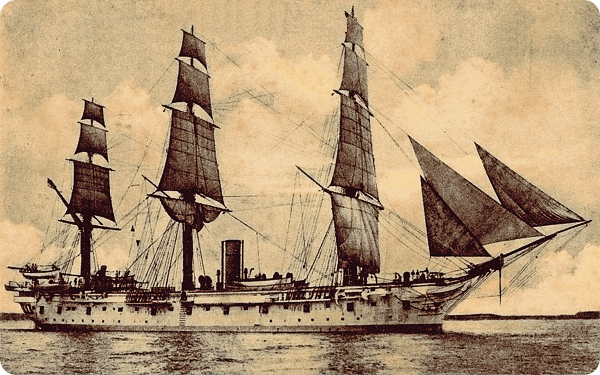
- SMS Marie

History

German Empire
- Name: Marie
- Namesake: Princess Marie of Schwarzburg-Rudolstadt
- Builder: Reiherstieg AG, Hamburg
- Laid down: 1880
- Launched: 20 August 1881
- Commissioned: 1 May 1883
- Decommissioned: 16 September 1895
- Stricken: 29 October 1904
- Fate: Sold, 1909

General characteristics
- Class & type: Carola-class corvette
- Displacement: Full load: 2,424 t (2,386 long tons)
- Length: 76.35 m (250 ft 6 in)
- Beam: 12.5 m (41 ft)
- Draft: 4.98 m (16 ft 4 in)
- Installed power: 6 × fire-tube boilers; 2,129 metric horsepower (2,100 ihp)
- Propulsion: 1 × screw propeller; 1 × double-expansion steam engine
- Speed: 14 knots (26 km/h; 16 mph)
- Range: 3,420 nautical miles (6,330 km; 3,940 mi) at 10 knots (19 km/h; 12 mph)
- Crew: 13 officers; 285 enlisted men
- Armament: 10 × 15 cm (5.9 in) guns; 2 × 8.7 cm (3.4 in) guns; 6 × 37 mm (1.5 in) Hotchkiss revolver cannon

SMS Marie was a member of the Carola class of steam corvettes built for the German Kaiserliche Marine (Imperial Navy) in the 1880s. Intended for service in the German colonial empire, the ship was designed with a combination of steam and sail power for extended range, and was equipped with a battery of ten 15-centimeter (5.9 in) guns. Marie was laid down at the Reiherstieg AG shipyard of Hamburg in 1880, the first Imperial German warship built in the city. She was launched in August 1881. In May, 1883, she was completed and commissioned into the fleet. The namesake was Princess Marie of Schwarzburg-Rudolstadt, who married Frederick Francis II, Grand Duke of Mecklenburg-Schwerin in 1868.

Marie was sent abroad immediately after entering service, initially to South America, where she picked up the German participants of the first International Polar Year at South Georgia Island. After observing the aftermath of the War of the Pacific in late 1883 and early 1884, she was transferred to Deutsch-Neuguinea in the western Pacific Ocean; this deployment was cut short when she ran aground off Neu-Mecklenburg and was badly damaged, necessitating a return to Germany for extensive repairs.

The ship was reactivated for a second overseas tour in 1892. She was sent to Chile to protect German nationals in the aftermath of the Chilean Civil War of 1891, before joining two of her sister ships off Brazil in 1893 in response to the Revolta da Armada (Revolt of the Fleet) there. The three ships were then sent to East Asia in 1894, where they formed the nucleus of the East Asia Division, and were tasked with protecting German nationals in China during the First Sino-Japanese War. Marie was recalled to Germany in mid-1895 and stopped in Morocco on the way back to enforce a settlement over the murder of two German citizens. After reaching Germany in September 1895, she was decommissioned. Later assigned to the reserve training unit, she was never activated for the role. Instead, she was eventually stricken from the naval register in 1904 and sold for scrap three years later.

== Design ==
The six ships of the Carola class were ordered in the late 1870s to supplement Germany's fleet of cruising warships, which at that time relied on several ships that were twenty years old. Marie and her sister ships were intended to patrol Germany's colonial empire and safeguard German economic interests around the world.

Marie was 76.35 meters (250 ft) long overall, with a beam of 12.5 m (41 ft) and a draft of 4.98 m (16.3 ft) forward. She displaced 2,424 metric tons (2,386 long tons) at full load. The ship's crew consisted of 13 officers and 285 enlisted men. She was powered by a single marine steam engine that drove one 2-bladed screw propeller, with steam provided by six coal-fired fire-tube boilers, which gave her a top speed of 14 knots (26 km/h; 16 mph) at 2,129 metric horsepower (2,100 ihp). She had a cruising radius of 3,420 nautical miles (6,330 km; 3,940 mi) at a speed of 10 knots (19 km/h; 12 mph). Marie was equipped with a three-masted barque rig to supplement her steam engines on extended overseas deployments.

Marie was armed with a battery of ten 15 cm (5.9 in) 22-caliber (cal.) breech-loading guns and two 8.7 cm (3.4 in) 24-cal. guns. She also carried six 37 mm (1.5 in) Hotchkiss revolver cannon. Later in her career, the 8.7 cm guns were replaced with a pair of 8.8 cm (3.5 in) SK L/30 guns and she received ten small-caliber machine cannon of unrecorded type.

== Service history ==
Marie was built by Reiherstieg AG of Hamburg; her keel was laid down in 1880 under the contract name "Ersatz Vineta", a replacement for the old sail frigate Vineta. (Note: German warships were ordered under provisional names. Additions to the fleet were given a single letter; ships intended to replace older or lost vessels were ordered as "Ersatz (name of the ship to be replaced)".) This was the first time that a Hamburg shipbuilder received a contract for a warship of the German Kaiserliche Marine (Imperial Navy). The new corvette was launched on 20 August 1881, and Hamburg's mayor, Gustav Heinrich Kirchenpauer, gave the launching speech. At her launching, she was christened Marie, for Princess Marie of Schwarzburg-Rudolstadt. Fitting-out work then commenced, and on 12 September she was moved to Wilhelmshaven, where her guns were installed. Marie began sea trials in late October, though she was not formally commissioned. The ship was commissioned on 1 May 1883 for a deployment to South American waters.

=== First overseas deployment ===
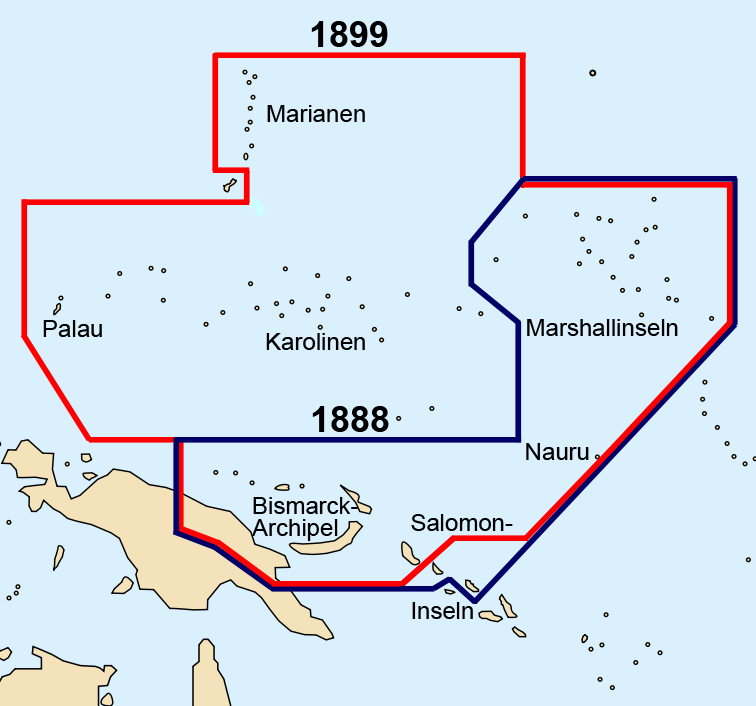
Map of German New Guinea

On 17 May, Marie left Wilhelmshaven, bound for South America, where she replaced the corvette Moltke. In Rio de Janeiro, Brazil Marie met the gunboat Albatross on 9 July. Marie then continued on to Punta Arenas, Chile, where she rendezvoused with Moltke on 2 August. She proceeded to South Georgia Island, but ran into heavy weather while en route. She lost two of her boats and was damaged in the storm, forcing her to put into Port Stanley in the Falkland Islands for repairs. On 23 August, she was able to return to her voyage, and on 1 September, she reached Moltke Harbor on the eastern side of the island. There, she picked up the German contingent from the first International Polar Year, which had been brought to the island by Moltke the year before. The scientists boarded Marie with their equipment, and the ship steamed to Montevideo, Uruguay on 6 September. Marie arrived in the port on 25 September and transferred the scientists and equipment to the HSDG steamship SS Persepolis, which took them back to Germany. During the trip to South Georgia and back to Montevideo, Marie tested a register log apparatus. Other similar studies followed.

On 10 October, Marie left Montevideo and passed through the Strait of Magellan into the Pacific Ocean. She reached Valparaíso, Chile on 20 November to observe the aftermath of the War of the Pacific between Peru and Bolivia on one side and Chile on the other. Chile and Peru had signed the Treaty of Ancón on 20 October, but Marie remained in the area until January 1884, when she began a tour of South American ports along the western coast of the continent, as far north as Puerto San José, Guatemala. While in Callao, Peru, the ship received orders to steam to Samoa in the central Pacific on 17 September.

She was to reinforce the German forces in the Pacific to defend the German acquisition of Kaiser-Wilhelmsland on the north eastern shore of New Guinea from British objections, which failed to materialize. She reached Apia on 30 October, and while there, her presence helped to coerce the king of Samoa into allowing Handels-und Plantagen-Gesellschaft der Südsee-Inseln zu Hamburg to control the Samoan treasury and police. She remained there until 14 November, when she departed for a cruise to Melanesia, part of Deutsch-Neuguinea, Germany's colonial holding in the western Pacific. She rendezvoused with the corvette Elisabeth and the gunboat Hyäne in Melanesia. Marie anchored first at Matupi Harbor in Neu-Pommern, where she relieved Elisabeth, which then steamed to East Asian waters.

While Marie was cruising off Neu-Mecklenburg on 26 December, she struck a reef and ran aground. The crew had to remove a significant amount of weight from the ship before she came free three days later. Divers determined the ship had been badly damaged: her rudder was broken, her propeller and propeller shaft were inoperable and her aft compartments were leaking. She put into the harbor in the nearby island of Nusa for temporary repairs on 4 January 1885. While the work was being done, a group of 12 men were sent in one of Marie's boats to relay news of the accident to Mioko island, some 200 nautical miles (370 km; 230 mi) away. Two days later, they met Hyäne there, which proceeded to Nusa to assist with the repairs. The steamship SS Samoa also joined them on 1 February and brought badly needed food. By 7 March, Marie was again seaworthy and she began the voyage to Australia in company with Hyäne, which had to take her under tow on the journey. The ships reached Keppel Bay on 16 April, where the corvette Stosch was waiting to tow Marie to Sydney for further repairs, which lasted from 6 May to 29 September. After emerging from the dry dock, she slowly steamed back to Germany to avoid stressing the damaged hull, arriving in Wilhelmshaven on 9 February 1886, where she was decommissioned for extensive repairs.

=== Second deployment abroad ===
SMS Marie, probably in Wilhelmshaven in the mid-1880s

After repairs were completed, Marie remained laid up until late 1892, when she was recommissioned to relieve her sister ship Sophie in the overseas cruiser squadron. At the time, the navy had implemented a plan whereby Germany's colonies would be protected by gunboats, while larger warships would generally be kept in reserve, with a handful assigned to a flying squadron that could respond to crises quickly. Before Marie joined the squadron, however, she was detached to the coast of South America in response to the Chilean Civil War of 1891. She left Wilhelmshaven on 17 December and arrived off Valparaíso on 26 March 1893, having stopped in Buenos Aires, Argentina and Montevideo on the way; the war had recently ended, but the German high command determined that the presence of a warship was still necessary to protect German interests. By this time, the cruiser squadron had been dissolved, and Marie was now formally sailing independently.

Marie visited ports along the western coast of South America, as she had in 1884, and she remained in the area until January 1894. The outbreak of the Revolta da Armada (Revolt of the Fleet) in Brazil prompted the navy to send Marie there to protect German interests, and she joined her sisters Alexandrine and Arcona there. Marie stopped in Puerto Montt, Chile, from 25 January to 8 February, before proceeding around Cape Horn and north to Brazil. She met Arcona on 24 February, and the three corvettes remained off Brazil until April, when the ships were sent to East Asia in response to growing tensions between China and Japan over Korea. On 8 May, Marie left Rio de Janeiro, but she had to stop again in Port Montt in June due to engine troubles, which delayed her rejoining the other two corvettes in Callao on 12 July. The three ships remained there until 15 August, by which time the First Sino-Japanese War had broken out. The ships then crossed the Pacific and reached Yokohama, Japan, in late September. Marie proceeded independently to Taku and then visited other ports in the Yellow Sea.

The East Asia Division; Marie is in the left background

While the ships were in Chefoo on 25 November, the East Asia Division was created, with Arcona as the flagship. The new protected cruiser Irene arrived to strengthen the unit in mid-February 1895. In the meantime, Japanese forces had landed on the Shantung Peninsula in China, and warships from several European powers gathered to send landing parties ashore to protect their nationals in the area; Marie was part of this operation, though her men were back aboard by 12 February. Irene's sister Prinzess Wilhelm arrived in June, allowing Marie to be sent back to Germany. She stopped in Singapore in mid-June and crossed the Indian Ocean, entered the Red Sea, and then transited the Suez Canal. In Port Said on 21 July, she was ordered to Morocco to help enforce a settlement with local authorities over the murder of a pair of German businessmen. She joined a flotilla consisting of the protected cruiser Kaiserin Augusta, the coastal defense ship Hagen, and Stosch on 8 August in Tangier. On 20 August, the Moroccan authorities agreed to a settlement, and the other three ships departed, leaving Marie behind to ensure the payment was made.

With the issue settled by early September, Marie too departed, and she arrived in Kiel on 16 September. There, she was decommissioned before being assigned to the reserve training unit on 9 April 1897. She did not see service in the role, however, owing to the cost of reactivating her for her intended task as an artillery training ship. Instead, she was ultimately stricken from the naval register on 29 October 1904, sold in 1909, and broken up in Stettin.
