= SMS Hay =

There were two ships in the Prussian Navy and later German Imperial Navy named SMS Hay:

- SMS Hay (1860) - a Jäger-class gunboat launched in 1860
- SMS Hay (1881) - a steam gunboat launched in 1881

== See also ==
- SMS Hai, an Austro-Hungarian torpedo boat launched in 1906
