= SMS Alexandrine =

Screw corvette of the German Imperial Navy

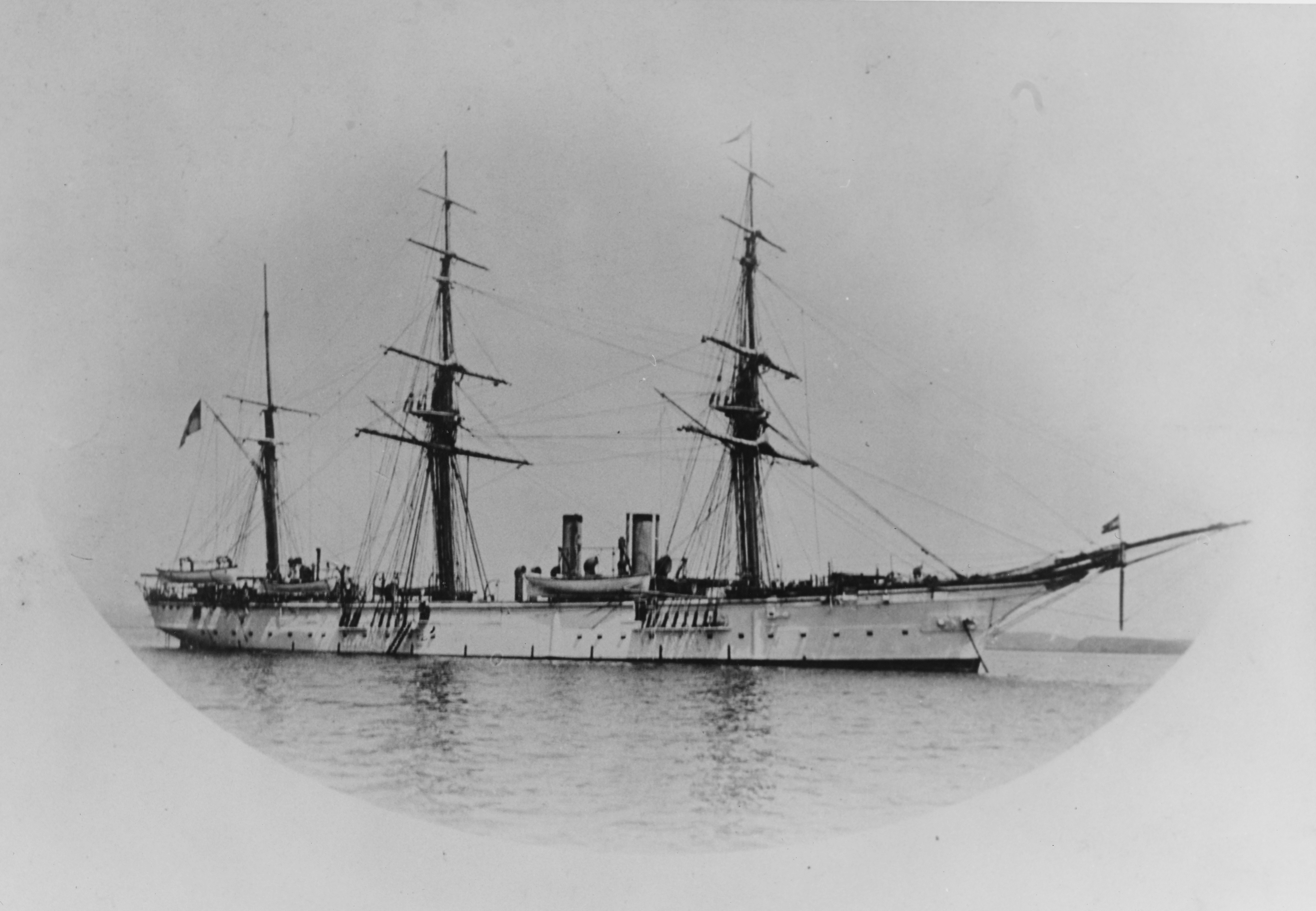
- Alexandrine sometime c. 1886–1895

History

German Empire
- Name: Alexandrine
- Builder: Kaiserliche Werft, Kiel
- Laid down: February 1882
- Launched: 7 February 1885
- Commissioned: October 1886
- Decommissioned: 1 June 1895
- Stricken: 27 May 1907
- Fate: Broken up, 1907

General characteristics
- Class & type: Carola-class corvette
- Displacement: Full load: 2,662 t (2,620 long tons)
- Length: 81.2 m (266 ft 5 in)
- Beam: 12.6 m (41 ft 4 in)
- Draft: 5 m (16 ft 5 in)
- Installed power: 8 × fire-tube boilers; 2,289 metric horsepower (2,258 ihp)
- Propulsion: 2 × screw propellers; 2 × double-expansion steam engines
- Speed: 14 knots (26 km/h; 16 mph)
- Range: 4,180 nautical miles (7,740 km; 4,810 mi) at 8.5 knots (15.7 km/h; 9.8 mph)
- Crew: 25 officers; 257 enlisted men
- Armament: 10 × 15 cm (5.9 in) guns; 2 × 8.7 cm (3.4 in) guns; 6 × 37 mm (1.5 in) Hotchkiss revolver cannon

SMS Alexandrine was a member of the Carola class of steam corvettes built for the German Kaiserliche Marine (Imperial Navy) in the 1880s. Intended for service in the German colonial empire, the ship was designed with a combination of steam and sail power for extended range, and was equipped with a battery of ten 15-centimeter (5.9 in) guns. Alexandrine was laid down at the Kaiserliche Werft (Imperial Shipyard) in Kiel in 1882, she was launched in February 1885, and she was completed in October 1886 before being laid up after completing sea trials.

Alexandrine was first activated in 1889 for a deployment to the Central Pacific, where competing claims to the islands of Samoa created tension between several colonial powers. The ship patrolled Deutsch-Neuguinea, Germany's colonial holdings in the Central Pacific, until 1891, when she joined the German Cruiser Squadron, which was sent to Chile to protect German nationals during the Chilean Civil War of 1891. The squadron thereafter cruised off East Asia in 1892, and by the end of the year, went to German East Africa. In 1893, she was sent to Brazil where the Revolta da Armada (Revolt of the Fleet) in that country threatened German interests. The ships were then sent back to East Asia to monitor the First Sino-Japanese War of 1894–1895.

In March 1895, Alexandrine was recalled to Germany; while en route, she stopped in Morocco to pressure local authorities into paying reparations for the murder of two German citizens. On her arrival in Germany she was found to be in poor condition after several years abroad, and so she was decommissioned in June 1895. She served as a floating battery in Danzig from 1904 to 1907, when she was stricken from the naval register, sold and used temporarily as a floating workshop, and then broken up later in 1907.

== Design ==
The six ships of the Carola class were ordered in the late 1870s to supplement Germany's fleet of cruising warships, which at that time relied on several ships that were twenty years old. Alexandrine and her sister ships were intended to patrol Germany's colonial empire and safeguard German economic interests around the world. The last two ships to be built, Alexandrine and Arcona, were built to a slightly larger design, being slightly longer and slightly heavier than their sisters.

Alexandrine was 81.2 meters (266 ft 5 in) long overall, with a beam of 12.6 m (41 ft 4 in) and a draft of 5 m (16 ft 5 in) forward. She displaced 2,662 metric tons (2,620 long tons) at full load. The ship's crew consisted of 25 officers and 257 enlisted men. She was powered by two marine steam engines that drove two 2-bladed screw propellers, with steam provided by eight coal-fired fire-tube boilers, which gave her a top speed of 14 knots (26 km/h; 16 mph) at 2,289 metric horsepower (2,258 ihp). She had a cruising radius of 4,180 nautical miles (7,740 km; 4,810 mi) at a speed of 8.5 knots (15.7 km/h; 9.8 mph). Alexandrine was equipped with a three-masted barque rig to supplement her steam engines on extended overseas deployments.

Alexandrine was armed with a battery of ten 15 cm (5.9 in) 22-caliber (cal.) breech-loading guns and two 8.7 cm (3.4 in) 24-cal. guns. She also carried six 37 mm (1.5 in) Hotchkiss revolver cannon. Later in her career, the 15 cm guns were replaced with more modern 30-cal. versions, and the 8.7 cm guns were replaced with four 10.5 cm (4.1 in) SK L/35 guns.

== Service history ==
Alexandrine, ordered under the contract name "G", (Note: German warships were ordered under provisional names. Additions to the fleet were given a single letter; ships intended to replace older or lost vessels were ordered as "Ersatz (name of the ship to be replaced)".) was laid down in February 1882 at the Kaiserliche Werft (Imperial Shipyard) in Kiel, and her completed hull was launched on 7 February 1885. Then-prince Wilhelm, the grandson of Kaiser Wilhelm I, gave the christening speech at her launching. The completed ship began sea trials in October 1886; these lasted until January 1887, when the ship was decommissioned in Wilhelmshaven. At the time, General Leo von Caprivi, the head of the Imperial Admiralty, had implemented a plan whereby Germany's colonies would be protected by gunboats, while larger warships would generally be kept in reserve, with a handful assigned to a flying squadron that could respond to crises quickly.

=== Deployment abroad ===
==== 1889–1891 ====
The ship remained laid up until 1889, when a major cyclone struck the islands of Samoa on 16 March and destroyed two German warships in Apia—the gunboats Adler and Eber. Conflicting claims on the islands from other powers led the German government to activate Alexandrine to defend German interests there. She was joined in that task by her sister ship Sophie and the gunboat Wolf, which had been in East African and East Asian waters, respectively. Alexandrine left Wilhelmshaven on 15 April, with now-Kaiser Wilhelm II aboard and steamed to Wangerooge, where Wilhelm II disembarked. The ship, using a combination of steam and sail power, proceeded through the Atlantic Ocean and Mediterranean Sea, stopping in Gibraltar along the way, before entering the Suez Canal at Port Said. She then continued through the Red Sea and stopped in Aden before crossing the Indian Ocean to Albany, Australia; from there, she went to Sydney, arriving there on 6 July.

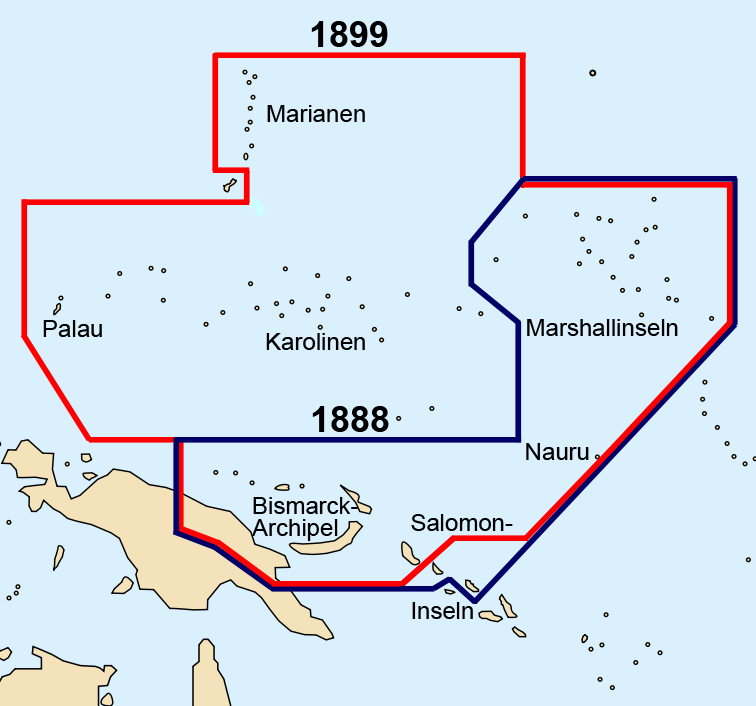
Map of German New Guinea

By this time, the situation in Samoa had calmed, so Alexandrine was sent on a tour of German protectorates in Melanesia, beginning on 24 July. Stops included the North Solomon Islands, Matupi in Neu-Pommern, Finschhafen in Deutsch-Neuguinea, and the Hermit Islands. The trip culminated with Kapsu island off Neu-Mecklenburg, where Alexandrine sent a landing party ashore to punish local residents who had murdered a pair of German citizens. From there, Alexandrine sailed to Sydney, where she remained from 1 to 30 November for repairs and to rest the crew. In March 1890, a steamer arrived in Auckland, New Zealand, with a new crew to relieve the men aboard Alexandrine. The ship then went to Apia, where she remained until early May, when she was sent on a tour of the Marshall Islands with the local Reichskommissar (Imperial Commissioner) on board. While en route, she stopped in the Gilbert Islands to settle disputes between Germans and locals. In June, the ship's crew participated in the ceremony installing Malietoa Laupepa as the ruler of Samoa.

Alexandrine then sailed to Sydney for maintenance, where in July she learned she had been assigned to the Cruiser Squadron under Konteradmiral (KAdm—Rear Admiral) Victor Valois. After visiting Melbourne and Adelaide, Alexandrine joined the other two corvettes of squadron—the flagship Leipzig, and Sophie—in Apia on 16 September. On 6 January 1891, Alexandrine visited several islands in the Samoa group before continuing with the rest of the squadron for a cruise in East Asian waters. While in Shanghai, China in April, Alexandrine exchanged crews another time. In the meantime, the Chilean Civil War of 1891 had broken out, prompting the German high command to send Valois's ships there on 3 May to safeguard German nationals in the country. While on the way, Leipzig ran low on coal and had to be towed for much of the journey. The ships arrived off the coast of Chile on 9 July and Valois secured an agreement with the authorities in Valparaíso for landing parties from the vessels to secure the European quarter of the city.

==== 1891–1895 ====
The East Asia Division; Alexandrine is at right

With the war over, the Cruiser Squadron left Chile in December and transited the Strait of Magellan into the South Atlantic. They stopped in Cape Town, where KAdm Friedrich von Pawelsz took command of the squadron on 23 February 1892. The three corvettes steamed to German East Africa, where Sophie was detached; Alexandrine and Leipzig continued on to East Asia. While in Colombo, Alexandrine received another new crew, and she took replacements for men from the gunboats Iltis and Wolf aboard as well. Alexandrine then returned to Chinese waters and stopped in Chemulpo, Korea, where the ship's captain received an audience with Gojong, the King of Joseon. While cruising in the Bohai Sea, several of the ship's crewmen fell seriously ill, forcing Alexandrine to put into Yokohama, Japan, where the German government operated a hospital.

The ship remained in Yokohama until 23 October, when she left to rendezvous with the flagship Leipzig, in Hong Kong. After arriving there on 4 November, the two ships proceeded to East Africa, where unrest due to a feared succession crisis on the island of Zanzibar. Following the death of Sultan Ali bin Said of Zanzibar in March 1893, power passed peacefully to his nephew, Hamad bin Thuwaini, and the crisis was averted. As a result, Alexandrine and Arcona were instead diverted to Cape Town, where on 6 April the Cruiser Squadron was disbanded. Both ships entered the dry dock in Cape Town for overhauls, after which they were sent to South America on 20 May. By mid-June, they had reached Brazil, and thereafter made stops in Buenos Aires, Argentina and Montevideo, Uruguay. The outbreak of the Revolta da Armada in Brazil forced both ships to return to the country to protect German interests there. The two corvettes were tasked with protecting guarding German-flagged merchant vessels and protecting German nationals in Brazil.

While operating in Brazil, an outbreak of Yellow fever aboard Alexandrine forced her to go into a quarantine in the Montevideo roadstead. The Brazilian government suppressed the revolution in early 1894, and by that time, Alexandrine's sister Marie had joined the German ships in Brazil. Tensions between China and Japan had been rising steadily over control of Korea, and as a result, the German high command sent the three corvettes to East Asia. On 7 March, they rounded Cape Horn and entered the Pacific Ocean, but while en route, the ships were diverted to Peru on 13 July to protect German interests during a revolution in the country. A week later, First Sino-Japanese War broke out, and Germany formed the East Asia Division with the three corvettes. On 15 August, the situation in Peru had calmed enough to allow the division to return to its intended mission in East Asia. They arrived in Yokohama, Japan on 26 September, and Alexandrine proceeded to Nagasaki for maintenance. After completing repairs, Alexandrine steamed to the northern coast of China to protect German interests in the region.

=== Fate ===
The ship's assignment to the East Asia Division did not last long; on 2 March 1895, she received orders to return to Germany. She left Singapore on 22 March, marking her departure from the East Asia Division. While in Port Said, she was ordered to go to Morocco to lend weight to German negotiators seeking compensation for the murder of two Germans in the country. After completing the task, she continued on to Wilhelmshaven, arriving there on 25 May. She was decommissioned a week later on 1 June; upon examination, it was found that her hull had badly deteriorated, and she was unsuitable for any further use. Alexandrine was towed to Danzig, where she was decommissioned. From 3 May 1904, she was employed as a floating battery, and on 27 May 1907, she was stricken from the naval register and sold for 148,000 marks. The buyer briefly used the ship as a floating workshop before breaking her up later that year.
