= SMS Arcona (1885) =

Screw corvette of the German Imperial Navy

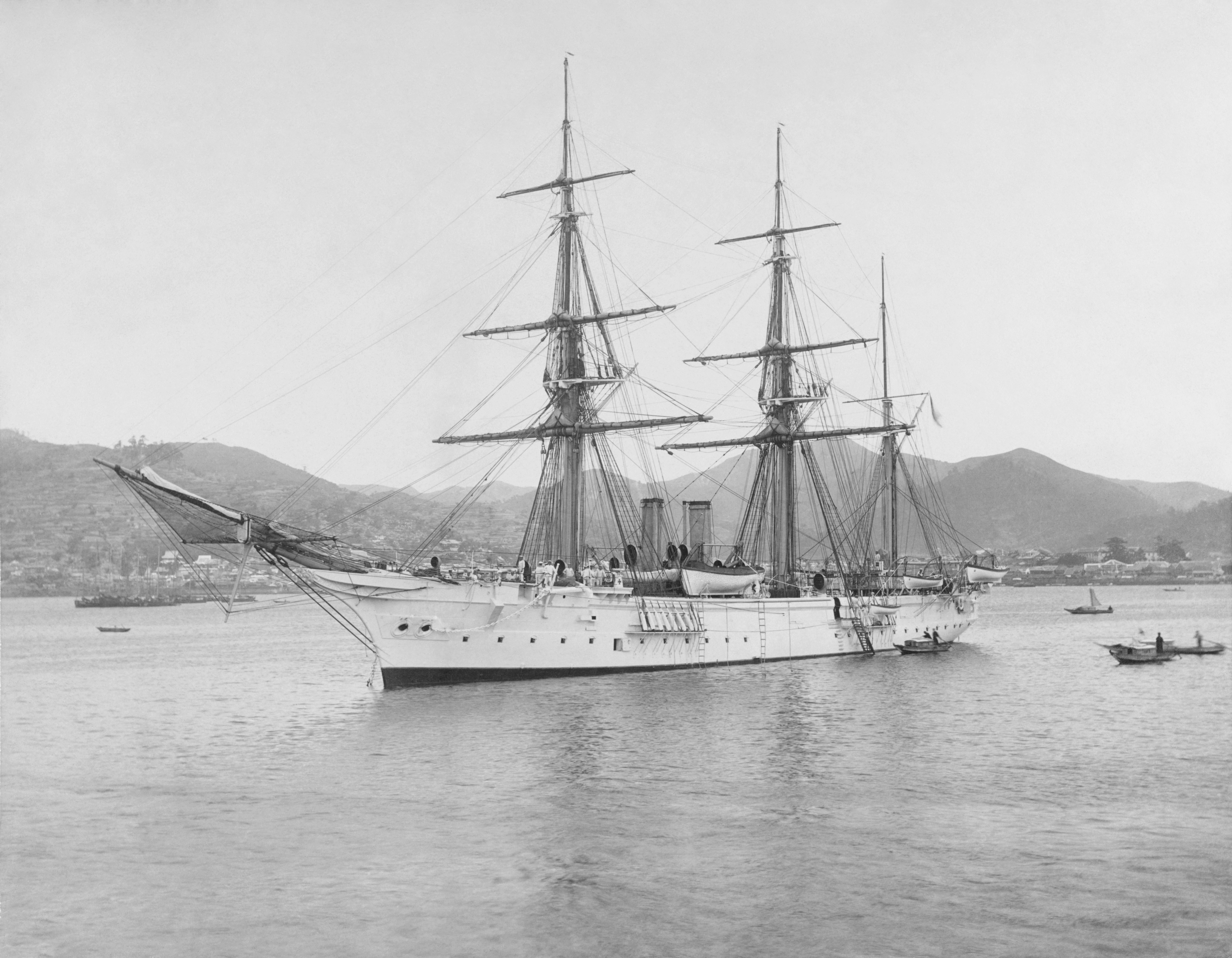
- Arcona in Nagasaki, Japan, c. 1897

History

German Empire
- Name: Arcona
- Namesake: Cape Arkona
- Builder: Kaiserliche Werft Danzig
- Laid down: 1881
- Launched: 7 May 1885
- Commissioned: 1 December 1886
- Renamed: Mercur, 1902
- Fate: Scrapped, 1906

General characteristics
- Class & type: Carola-class corvette
- Displacement: Full load: 2,662 t (2,620 long tons)
- Length: 81.2 m (266 ft 5 in)
- Beam: 12.6 m (41 ft 4 in)
- Draft: 5 m (16 ft 5 in)
- Installed power: 8 × fire-tube boilers; 2,461 metric horsepower (2,427 ihp)
- Propulsion: 2 × screw propellers; 2 × double-expansion steam engines
- Speed: 14.1 knots (26.1 km/h; 16.2 mph)
- Range: 4,180 nautical miles (7,740 km; 4,810 mi) at 8.5 knots (15.7 km/h; 9.8 mph)
- Crew: 25 officers; 257 enlisted men
- Armament: 10 × 15 cm (5.9 in) guns; 2 × 8.7 cm (3.4 in) guns; 6 × 37 mm (1.5 in) Hotchkiss revolver cannon

SMS Arcona was a member of the Carola class of steam corvettes built for the German Kaiserliche Marine (Imperial Navy) in the 1880s. Intended for service in the German colonial empire, the ship was designed with a combination of steam and sail power for extended range, and was equipped with a battery of ten 15-centimeter (5.9 in) guns. Arcona was laid down at the Kaiserliche Werft (Imperial Shipyard) in Danzig in 1881, she was launched in May 1885, and she was completed in December 1886.

Arcona was kept in reserve after completion until 1892, when she was activated for an extended deployment abroad. She protected German interests in Venezuela in 1892 before joining the Cruiser Division in German East Africa the following year. Later in 1893, she was sent to Brazil when a naval revolt threatened German nationals in the country. The outbreak of the First Sino-Japanese War in 1894 prompted the transfer of Arcona and two of her sister ships to East Asia as the nucleus of the East Asia Division, of which Arcona served as the flagship.

The ship was under repair when Otto von Diederichs seized the Jiaozhou Bay Leased Territory in China with the rest of the Division in 1897, and was therefore unable to participate in the operation, though she later assisted in defending the concession. Arcona then conducted survey cruises in the central Pacific Ocean and protected German nationals in the Philippines after the Spanish–American War in 1898. In early 1899, she was recalled to Germany, decommissioned in June, and renamed Mercur in January 1902. She was ultimately broken up in 1906.

== Design ==
The six ships of the Carola class were ordered in the late 1870s to supplement Germany's fleet of cruising warships, which at that time relied on several ships that were twenty years old. Arcona and her sister ships were intended to patrol Germany's colonial empire and safeguard German economic interests around the world. The last two ships to be built, Arcona and Alexandrine, were built to a slightly larger design, being slightly longer and slightly heavier than their sisters.

Arcona was 81.2 meters (266 ft 5 in) long overall, with a beam of 12.6 m (41 ft 4 in) and a draft of 5 m (16 ft 5 in) forward. She displaced 2,662 metric tons (2,620 long tons) at full load. The ship's crew consisted of 25 officers and 257 enlisted men. She was powered by two marine steam engines that drove two 2-bladed screw propellers, with steam provided by eight coal-fired fire-tube boilers, which gave her a top speed of 14.1 knots (26.1 km/h; 16.2 mph) at 2,461 metric horsepower (2,427 ihp). She had a cruising radius of 4,180 nautical miles (7,740 km; 4,810 mi) at a speed of 8.5 knots (15.7 km/h; 9.8 mph). Arcona was equipped with a three-masted barque rig to supplement her steam engines on extended overseas deployments.

Arcona was armed with a battery of ten 15 cm (5.9 in) 22-caliber (cal.) breech-loading guns and two 8.7 cm (3.4 in) 24-cal. guns. She also carried six 37 mm (1.5 in) Hotchkiss revolver cannon. Later in her career, the 15 cm guns were replaced with the more powerful 15 cm MRK L/30, and the 8.7 cm guns were replaced with four 10.5 cm (4.1 in) SK L/35 guns.

== Service history ==
=== Construction to 1894 ===
Arcona was laid down in 1881 at the Kaiserliche Werft (Imperial Shipyard) in Danzig under the provisional designation "Ersatz Nymphe". (Note: German warships were ordered under provisional names. Additions to the fleet were given a single letter; ships intended to replace older or lost vessels were ordered as "Ersatz (name of the ship to be replaced)".) She was launched on 7 May 1885, on a sideways slipway, unlike the traditional stern-first method. This was the first time the technique was used in Germany. A formal christening eleven days later, with a speech by Vizeadmiral (Vice Admiral) Eduard von Jachmann. Arcona was commissioned for sea trials on 1 December 1886, during which she steamed to Kiel and Wilhelmshaven. The trials concluded on 25 January 1887, when the ship was decommissioned and placed in reserve. At the time, General Leo von Caprivi, the head of the Imperial Admiralty, had implemented a plan whereby Germany's colonies would be protected by gunboats, while larger warships would generally be kept in reserve, with a handful assigned to a flying squadron that could respond to crises quickly.

She remained laid up for five years, until she was recommissioned on 20 April 1892 for service with the Germany's overseas cruiser division. The unit was tasked with securing German interests in East Asia, but before she had left Germany, Arcona was temporarily sent to Venezuela, where unrest threatened German businesses in the country. She left Wilhelmshaven on 4 May and arrived in La Guaira, Venezuela on 9 June. Over the next three months, an international squadron that included the French cruiser Magon, the Dutch cruiser HNLMS De Ruyter, the Spanish sloop Jorge Juan, and the British screw corvettes HMS Canada and Pylades cruised off the coast of Venezuela to observe the political situation there. She then proceeded to Macuto, where attacks on German nationals had occurred, and the ship's presence was sufficient to secure an apology from the Venezuelan government. By mid-October, the revolution had ended, allowing Arcona to leave the area and join the cruiser division, which was at that time stationed in east African waters. While en route, Arcona made stops in several islands in the Caribbean Sea, including Trinidad, Grenada, Barbados, and St. Vincent. She then crossed the Atlantic Ocean and stopped in Gibraltar, before continuing on to Naples, Italy; there, the ship's captain was relieved, as he had fallen ill while in Venezuela.

Arcona then proceeded to Port Said and transited the Suez Canal, stopping at Aden. From there, she steamed to Zanzibar, where she rejoined the cruiser division on 6 February 1893. At the time, the division also included her sister ship Alexandrine and the corvette Leipzig, and it was commanded by Konteradmiral (KAdm—Rear Admiral) Friedrich von Pawelsz. Arcona's time with the division was short-lived, as the three corvettes proceeded to Cape Town, Cape Colony, where on 6 April the division was disbanded. Arcona was assigned to German South West Africa; that day, she left Cape Town to take a pair of small field guns to strengthen the local Schutztruppe (Protection force) unit there. On 10 April, she arrived in Walvis Bay, a small British enclave on the coast of German South West Africa. There, she disembarked the two guns, but British authorities initially refused to allow their transfer to the Schutztruppe, though by September German protests had forced the local government to send the guns inland.

Arcona left African waters in mid-May to re-cross the Atlantic, initially stopping in Rio de Janeiro, Brazil on 1 June, and then Montevideo, Uruguay, where she remained from 25 June to 8 July. She joined Alexandrine in São Francisco do Sul, Brazil on 27 July. That year, the Brazilian Navy mutinied, and Arcona and Alexandrine were tasked with protecting German interests in the country. Rebels had seized the Hamburg Süd steamship SS Santos on 3 November, which had been carrying a cargo of rifles, and Arcona's commander went in her steam pinnace to secure the vessel's release. On 31 January 1894, Arcona went to Buenos Aires to allow her crew to rest and to avoid an outbreak of Yellow fever. While there, she and Alexandrine were joined by their sister Marie. The three vessels went to Rio de Janeiro on 22 April, and then continued on to Cabo Frio.

=== Service with the East Asia Division ===
The East Asia Division in the early 1890s; Arcona is the furthest left

As tensions between Japan and China over Korea rose in early 1894, Arcona, Alexandrine, and Marie were transferred to East Asia. On 7 March, they rounded Cape Horn and entered the Pacific Ocean, but storm damage forced Arcona to put into Valparaíso, Chile, for repairs. After the work had been completed, the three corvettes met off Callao, Peru, on 13 July to protect German interests during a revolution in the country. A week later, First Sino-Japanese War broke out, and Germany formed the East Asia Division with the three corvettes. On 15 August, the situation in Peru had calmed enough to allow the division to return to its intended mission in East Asia. They arrived in Yokohama, Japan on 26 September. Arcona steamed independently to Shanghai, China, and then to Chefoo, before returning to Shanghai to embark KAdm Paul Hoffmann, the divisional commander on 25 November. From there, Arcona went north to the Yellow Sea, where the Chinese and Japanese forces were operating. In mid-December, she returned to Shanghai for periodic maintenance, and there she was replaced as the divisional flagship by the new protected cruiser Irene on 14 February 1895.

For the remainder of the war, which ended in April, Arcona patrolled the Chinese coast with the rest of the division and individually. China's defeat led to riots against foreigners in the country, so Arcona and the rest of the division had to remain in Chinese waters to protect Europeans. In December, Arcona went to Manila in the Philippines, where unrest from the local Filipinos against the Spanish colonial government threatened other Europeans in the country. Arcona then returned to China, where on 27–28 July, she assisted in the salvage of the gunboat Iltis, which had run aground off the coast of the Shandong Peninsula. By early November, the civil disturbances in the Philippines had continued to increase, necessitating Arcona's return to the islands. She sent a detachment of marines ashore, along with contingents from British and French warships, to protect the European consulates in Manila. On 28 November, Irene arrived to relieve Arcona.

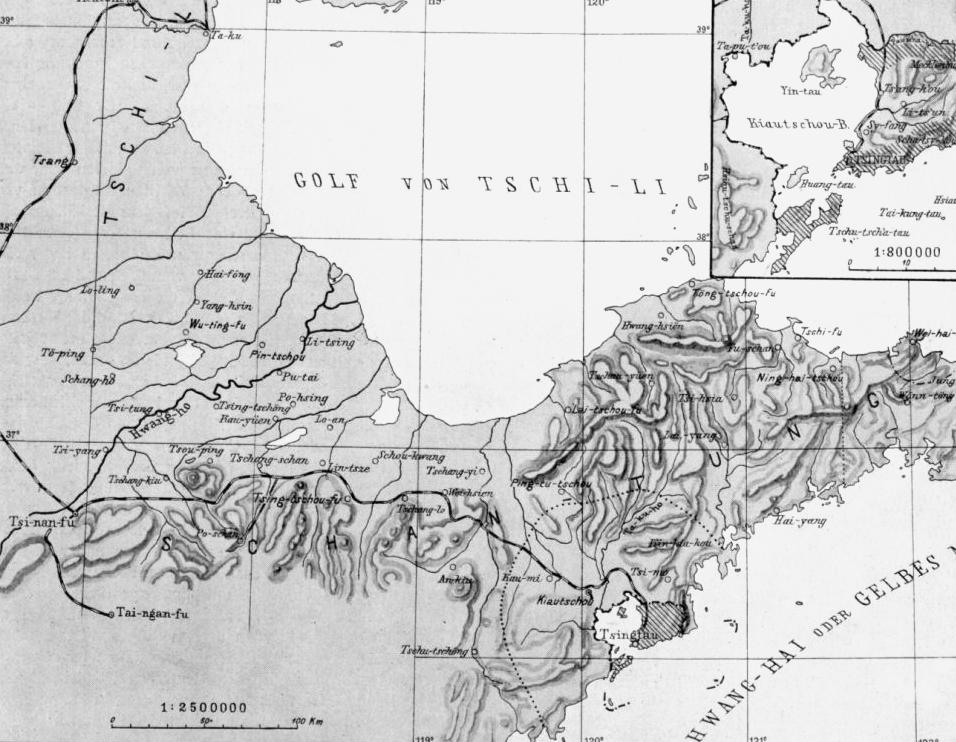
German 1912 map of the Shandong Peninsula showing the Jiaozhou Bay Leased Territory

In June 1897, KAdm Otto von Diederichs assumed command of the East Asia Division, and flew his flag in the ironclad Kaiser, which had been rebuilt into an armored cruiser. In addition to Arcona, the division at that time included Irene and her sister Prinzess Wilhelm. The unprotected cruiser Cormoran was independently stationed in the Pacific, but could be called upon to join Diederichs' force if necessary. While Kaiser was steaming to join the other three cruisers, they conducted gunnery training in Chefoo. In July, Diederichs sent Arcona to conduct a survey of the island of Sakhalin. In October, Arcona went to Shanghai for maintenance; she was still being repaired when the East Asia Division seized the Jiaozhou Bay Leased Territory in China on 14 November. Arcona arrived three days later. After Diederichs seized the territory, three additional warships were sent to reinforce him, allowing the division to be elevated to a full squadron. Arcona and the other three ships originally in the unit became the 1st Division, while the three new vessels, along with Cormoran, which was now formally assigned to Diederichs' command, formed the 2nd Division.

Shortly after the Germans seized Jiaozhou, with its port at Qingdao, the Chinese commander of the local army garrison attempted to launch a counterattack on 18 November, but the German soldiers in the port advanced and captured the Chinese general. While they were away, Diederichs ordered Arcona and Cormoran to send marines ashore to defend the town in the event that a Chinese force arrived, but no attack materialized. The men from the two ships remained in Qingdao until 21 November, when they returned to their vessels. Arcona was thereafter ordered to serve as a guard ship in the port. In July 1898, Diederichs sent Irene to relieve Arcona, which he sent to conduct surveys of the Caroline Islands and the Mariana Islands in the central Pacific. While in the Carolines, she stopped at Pohnpei to punish locals who had murdered a crewman from a German schooner. She completed this mission in October, when she steamed to the Philippines to relieve Prinzess Wilhelm, which had been stationed there to protect German nationals in the aftermath of the Spanish–American War earlier that year. She remained there for just a month, however, being replaced by Irene in November.

On 15 November, Kaiser ran aground in Samsah Bay, and Arcona and Cormoran were sent to render aid; the two cruisers were able to pull the ship free, which proceeded under her own power to Hong Kong for repairs. Arcona received the order to return to Germany on 31 January 1899. While on the voyage back, she conducted a short tour of the Persian Gulf, stopping in Muscat, Basra, Bushehr, and Bandar Lengeh. She arrived back in Wilhelmshaven on 27 May, having spent seven years abroad. Arcona was decommissioned on 6 June and placed in reserve at Kiel. On 11 January 1902, she was renamed Mercur, so her name could be reused on the light cruiser Arcona. Mercur was then towed to Danzig on 13 August, where she was removed from the naval register and was reclassified as a miscellaneous harbor ship. She was eventually broken up for scrap in 1906.
