= SMS Sophie =

Screw corvette of the German Imperial Navy

- Sophie sometime between 1882 and 1897

History

German Empire
- Name: Sophie
- Namesake: Sophie, Grand Duchess of Saxe-Weimar-Eisenach
- Laid down: January 1880
- Launched: 10 November 1881
- Commissioned: 10 August 1882
- Decommissioned: 7 April 1899
- Fate: Scrapped, 1921

General characteristics
- Class & type: Carola-class corvette
- Displacement: Full load: 2,424 t (2,386 long tons)
- Length: 76.35 m (250 ft 6 in)
- Beam: 12.5 m (41 ft)
- Draft: 4.98 m (16 ft 4 in)
- Installed power: 6 × fire-tube boilers; 2,156 metric horsepower (2,127 ihp)
- Propulsion: 1 × screw propeller; 1 × double-expansion steam engine
- Speed: 14 knots (26 km/h; 16 mph)
- Range: 3,420 nautical miles (6,330 km; 3,940 mi) at 10 knots (19 km/h; 12 mph)
- Crew: 13 officers; 285 enlisted men
- Armament: 10 × 15 cm (5.9 in) guns; 2 × 8.7 cm (3.4 in) guns; 6 × 37 mm (1.5 in) Hotchkiss revolver cannon

SMS Sophie was a member of the Carola class of steam corvettes built for the German Kaiserliche Marine (Imperial Navy) in the 1880s. Intended for service in the German colonial empire, the ship was designed with a combination of steam and sail power for extended range, and was equipped with a battery of ten 15-centimeter (5.9 in) guns. Sophie was laid down at the Kaiserliche Werft (Imperial Shipyard) in Danzig in 1880, she was launched in November 1881, and she was completed in August 1882.

Sophie was sent abroad in 1883, first to escort Crown Prince Friedrich Wilhelm on a visit to Spain. She then went to western Africa to protect German nationals in Togo before Germany had declared a protectorate in the country. The ship then returned home and was tasked with training duties; during exercises in September 1884, she was rammed and badly damaged by a steam ship. She returned to service after lengthy repairs, and in 1885 and 1886, went on extended training cruises, the first to the West Indies and the second to Spain.

While on the second cruise, she was ordered to join the cruise squadron Germany maintained to respond to crises around the world. She patrolled German colonial holdings in German East Africa and German New Guinea from 1886 to 1892. In June 1892, she was recalled to Germany and decommissioned. Sophie returned to training ship duties in January 1898, but this lasted for only a year before she was withdrawn in March 1899. She ended her career as a barracks ship, ultimately being sold in 1920 and broken up the following year.

== Design ==
The six ships of the Carola class were ordered in the late 1870s to supplement Germany's fleet of cruising warships, which at that time relied on several ships that were twenty years old. Sophie and her sister ships were intended to patrol Germany's colonial empire and safeguard German economic interests around the world.

Sophie was 76.35 meters (250 ft 6 in) long overall, with a beam of 12.5 m (41 ft) and a draft of 4.98 m (16 ft 4 in) forward. She displaced 2,424 metric tons (2,386 long tons) at full load. The ship's crew consisted of 13 officers and 285 enlisted men. She was powered by a single marine steam engine that drove one 2-bladed screw propeller, with steam provided by six coal-fired fire-tube boilers, which gave her a top speed of 14 knots (26 km/h; 16 mph) at 2,156 metric horsepower (2,127 ihp). She had a cruising radius of 3,420 nautical miles (6,330 km; 3,940 mi) at a speed of 10 knots (19 km/h; 12 mph). Sophie was equipped with a three-masted barque rig to supplement her steam engines on extended overseas deployments.

Sophie was armed with a battery of ten 15 cm (5.9 in) 22-caliber (cal.) breech-loading guns and two 8.7 cm (3.4 in) 24-cal. guns. She also carried six 37 mm (1.5 in) Hotchkiss revolver cannon. Later in her career, the 8.7 cm guns were replaced with a pair of 8.8 cm (3.5 in) SK L/30 guns and she received ten small-caliber machine cannon of unrecorded type.

== Service history ==
Sophie was ordered under the contract name "F" in 1879, (Note: German warships were ordered under provisional names. Additions to the fleet were given a single letter; ships intended to replace older or lost vessels were ordered as "Ersatz (name of the ship to be replaced)".) to designate a new addition to the fleet. Her keel was laid down at the Kaiserliche Werft (Imperial Shipyard) in Danzig in January 1880. The completed hull was launched on 10 November 1881 and Konteradmiral (KAdm—Rear Admiral) Otto Livonius gave the launching speech. She was named for Sophie, Grand Duchess of Saxe-Weimar-Eisenach. After completing fitting-out work, Sophie began sea trials on 10 August 1882. On 26 August, she was transferred to Kiel for further trials, which lasted until 15 November. During this period, she took part in training exercises in September with the practice squadron. On 18 December, the ship was decommissioned in Wilhelmshaven.

=== First overseas deployment ===
The ship remained laid up until 2 October 1883, when she was reactivated for a deployment abroad. At the time, General Leo von Caprivi, the head of the Imperial Admiralty, had implemented a plan whereby Germany's colonies would be protected by gunboats, while larger warships would generally be kept in reserve, with a handful assigned to a flying squadron that could respond to crises quickly. Sophie left Wilhelmshaven on 14 October in company with the corvette Prinz Adalbert, bound for the Mediterranean Sea. They reached Genoa, Italy on 27 October, where they met the aviso Loreley. There, Crown Prince Friedrich Wilhelm boarded Prinz Adalbert, and the three ships left for Spain. While en route, Sophie lost her jib-boom in a storm and had to take Loreley under tow.

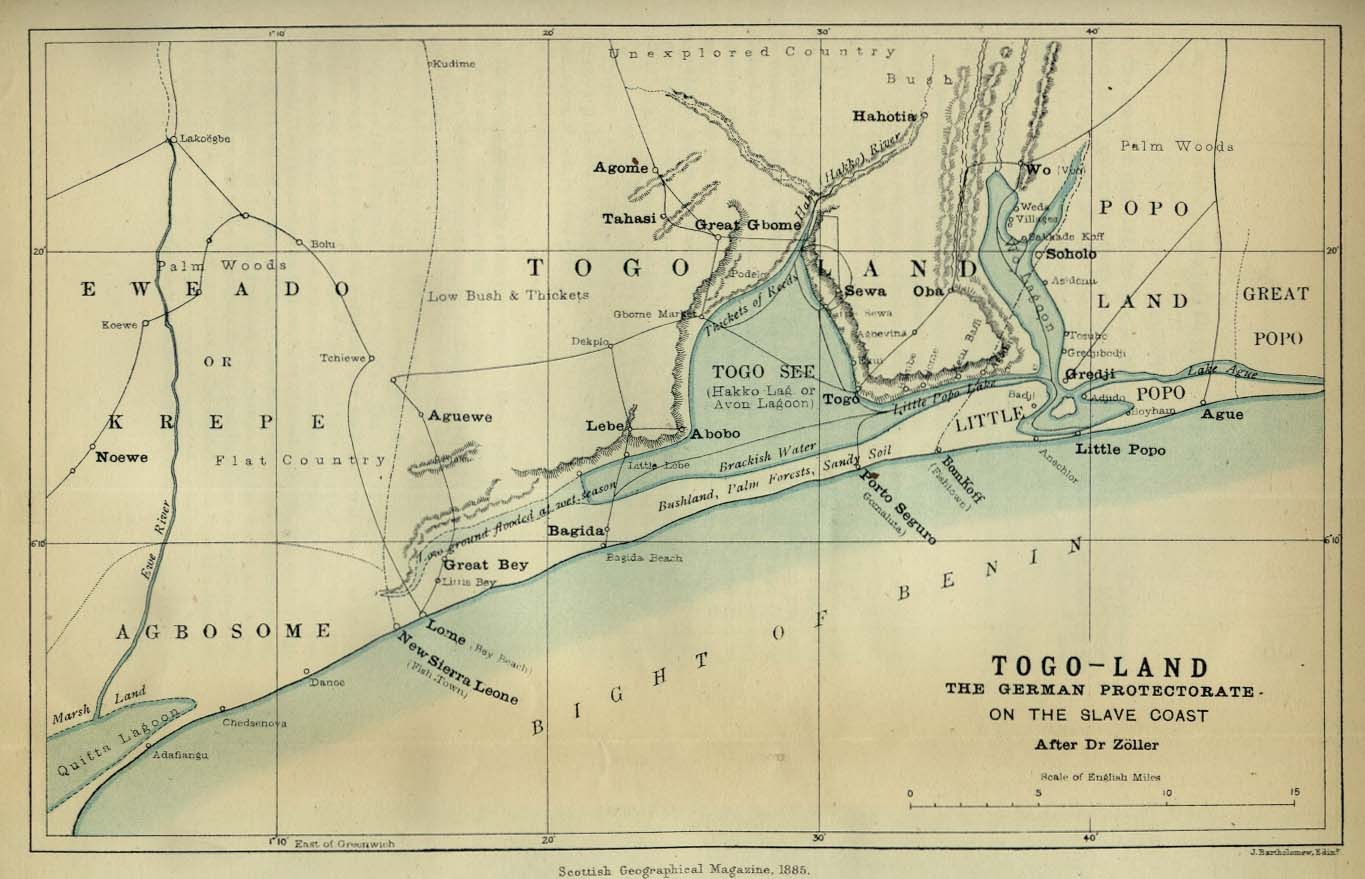
Map of Togoland in 1885

After concluding Friedrich Wilhelm's visit to Spain, the three ships took him back to Genoa. Sophie was then ordered to East Asia, but before she left Italy, her orders were changed to West Africa. She exited the Mediterranean on 30 December, bound for what was to become the protectorate of Togoland, where significant opposition to German commercial activities was occurring. A German merchant ship had become stranded in the area, and locals had murdered the crew and plundered the ship. German trading stations in the country had also been attacked. While en route, Sophie stopped at the ruins of Groß Friedrichsburg, the capital of the old Brandenburger Gold Coast, which had been founded in the 1680s. The ship's captain and a landing party went ashore to make sketches of the fortress ruins; they located six old guns, one of which was taken aboard Sophie and later returned to Germany for display. The captain, Wilhelm Steubenrauch, was under orders to avoid any aggressive action, and to merely show the flag and report on conditions in the area. She anchored off Lomé on 29 February 1884.

Sophie then proceeded to Klein-Popo, Togo where a local chief had been launching attacks of Germans in the area, and had convinced several other chiefs to join him in his efforts to expel the Germans. Steubenrauch negotiated with the chief and reached a suitable settlement, but similar incidents at Gross-Popo forced Sophie to proceed there on 2 February, though not all of the chiefs had agreed to the settlement. Owing to the gravity of the situation, Steubenrauch ignored his orders to avoid combat, and he sent a landing party of 150 men ashore to protect the German trading post in Klein-Popo and arrest the chiefs who remained hostile, who were taken aboard Sophie before she departed. After reaching Gross-Popo, Sophie encountered a British corvette, which had the governor of the Gold Coast colony board; Steubenrauch negotiated the legality of his actions and the release of the chiefs with the British governor. Steubenrauch then entered into discussions with the chief of Gross-Popo from 5 to 7 February, and they also reached a peaceful solution. Sophie then proceeded to Porto Grande Bay, where Steubenrauch reported his activities. Caprivi commended Steubenrauch for his decisive actions and ordered Sophie to return to Germany for repairs. She arrived back in Wilhelmshaven on 30 March.

=== Training duties ===
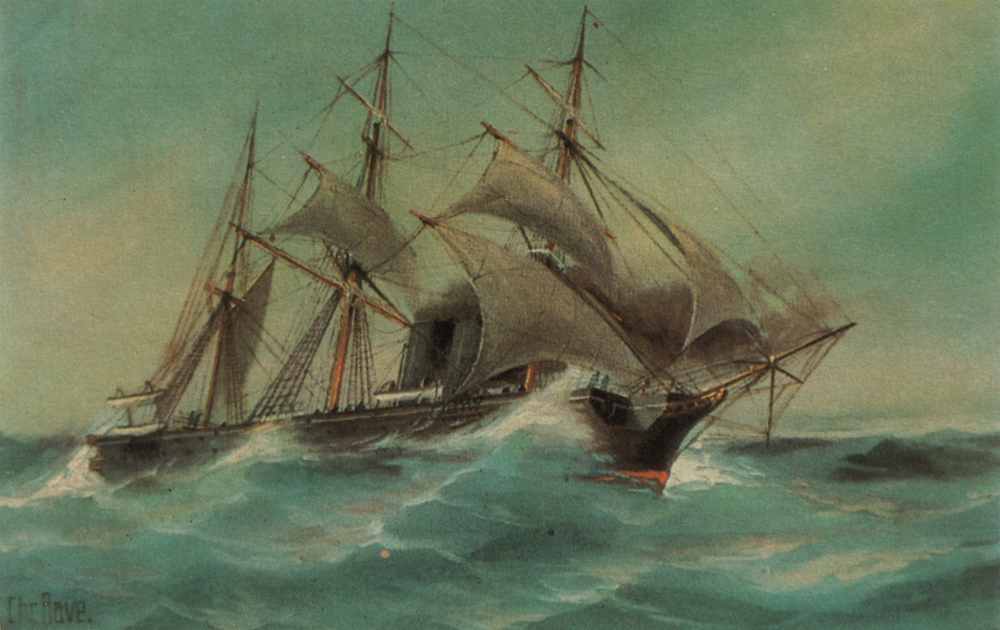
An old postcard of Sophie, featuring a painting of the ship by Christopher Rave

By May 1884, Sophie was again ready for service, and she was assigned to training ship duties, as the flagship of the training squadron. The squadron commander was KAdm Wilhelm von Wickede, and the squadron also included the old sail frigate Niobe, the corvette Nymphe, and the brigs Undine and Rover. She began her first training cruise on 10 May in the Baltic Sea in company with the rest of the squadron, and she joined the fleet for training maneuvers from 30 June to 8 July. By 13 August, she returned to Kiel before proceeding into the North Sea for additional exercises with the fleet. On 3 September, while she was steaming from the mouth of the Weser to Wilhelmshaven, the Norddeutscher Lloyd steamer SS Hohenstaufen tried to pass between Sophie and a vessel in front of her, but her captain misjudged the distance, and Hohenstaufen rammed Sophie on her port side at 13:40. Sophie was badly damaged in the collision, with a large hole torn into her hull from her weather deck down to below the level of the coal bunker, but her crew quickly contained the flooding. The ironclad Württemberg took her under tow back to Wilhelmshaven, and Sophie was decommissioned for repairs on 16 September.

Repairs were completed by April 1885, and she was recommissioned on the 9th. In company with the corvette Stein, Sophie began another training cruise on 12 May, which saw the ships visit several ports in Scandinavia. Sophie was assigned to the I Division of the Exercise Squadron from the end of July to 23 September, during which the squadron conducted maneuvers in the North and Baltic Seas. The navy created a training squadron consisting of Sophie and Stein, which served as the flagship. The squadron then began a training cruise, which departed on 13 October, bound for the West Indies. The two ships returned to Wilhelmshaven on 27 March 1886, the squadron was dissolved, and Sophie underwent an overhaul. The training routine for 1886 followed the same pattern as the year before, with Sophie and Stein again assigned to a temporary training squadron, though this year, the ships went to Lisbon, Portugal.

=== Second tour abroad ===
While in Lisbon, the navy ordered Sophie to leave Stein and join the cruiser squadron in German East Africa, commanded by Kommodore (Commodore) Karl Eduard Heusner. After exchanging her trainees with trained men from Stein, she departed on 6 November and reached the cruiser squadron in Zanzibar on 14 December. In March 1887, the ships went to Cape Town, and in mid-April, Sophie was detached from the squadron to the Pacific Ocean station. She stopped in Sydney, Australia, where she took part in a celebration of Queen Victoria's 40th year on the British throne. From 19 August to 21 November, she lay off Apia in Samoa, and in December, she began a cruise through the Bismarck Archipelago, part of the German protectorate of German New Guinea. She concluded the cruise in Hong Kong on 6 January 1888, where she underwent an overhaul. While there, her captain died from typhus on 16 March. By this time, the cruiser squadron had joined Sophie in the Pacific, and the ships cruised together in East Asian waters. On 31 May, Sophie stopped in Singapore for more maintenance work, and while there, the squadron received orders to return to East Africa.

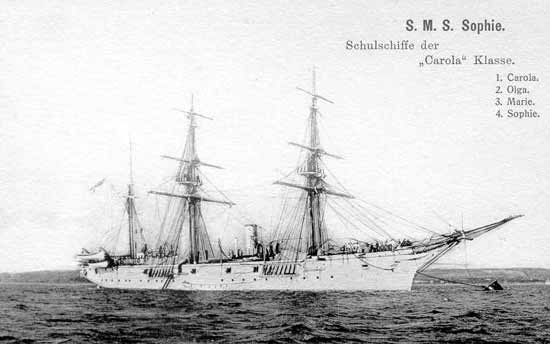
A postcard depicting Sophie, c. 1886

After arriving, the squadron flagship, Bismarck, was ordered to return to Germany. As a result, Heusner transferred his flag to Sophie on 9 June. The squadron, which at this time consisted of Sophie and her sisters Carola and Olga, arrived in Zanzibar on 29 June, but two days later, Heusner was also instructed to return home for a new command, so Sophie departed for Aden. She waited there from 28 July to 19 August for the new commander, KAdm Karl August Deinhard to arrive, before proceeding to Manda Bay in German East Africa. She arrived there on 30 August and Deinhard shifted his flag to the corvette Leipzig. The navy had intended to send Sophie to the Pacific, but damage to her engines sustained on the trip back from Aden precluded such a long voyage, so Olga was sent instead. Sophie went to Mikindani, Kenya and then to Lindi in German East Africa before putting a landing party ashore at the mouth of the Kingani river on 27 October. The men returned to their ship the next day, which proceeded to Windi three days later for another landing operation. Deinhard temporarily came aboard Sophie to direct a blockade of the coast from 28 November to 1 December, from the Mafia Channel to Kiswere.

In mid-January 1889, Sophie went to Dar es Salaam, where she sent a detachment ashore to guard the town. The health of the crew steadily deteriorated while in Dar es Salaam. Her executive officer and commander of the landing party, Kapitanleutnant (Captain Lieutenant) Landfermann, died of a heat stroke, and the ship's commander fell ill, forcing the executive officer from Leipzig to temporarily take command of Sophie while a new captain was en route. The 1889 Apia cyclone destroyed the gunboats Adler and Eber in March, so the navy ordered Sophie to leave East Africa to replace them. Three days after the ship's new commander arrived on 2 April, she departed, but had to stop in Port Louis, Mauritius to repair damage to one of her propellers. She arrived in Apia on 25 June, where she met the only other German warship in the Pacific, the gunboat Wolf, which had brought Malietoa Laupepa back from exile. Sophie fired a salute to mark his return to power as the ruler of Samoa.

After her sister Alexandrine arrived on 14 December, Sophie departed for Sydney to repair damage sustained during a cyclone, arriving there on 2 January 1890. On 25 January, with repairs completed, she began a tour of the Bismarck Archipelago, which concluded with a visit to Sir Charles Hardy Island to punish locals who had robbed and murdered a German merchant. In early March, she went to East Asian waters, and while en route, joined the fruitless search for a boat lost near the Jaluit Atoll that had been at sea with two dozen people aboard. Sophie arrived in Hong Kong on 22 March, where she met Leipzig. Sophie went into the drydock for an overhaul that lasted from 23 April to 10 May. On 18 May, she left Hong Kong to cruise along the southern Chinese coast and visit Singapore, at which point she rendezvoused with Leipzig to visit Sydney. There, they were joined by Alexandrine, and the three ships proceeded on together to New Zealand before turning north to Samoa. They arrived in Apia on 19 December, and remained there until early January 1891. Sophie went to the Marshall Islands and then returned to Hong Kong, where she remained from 14 February to 4 March.

After leaving Hong Kong, Sophie visited several other Chinese and Japanese ports. In the meantime, the Chilean Civil War of 1891 had broken out, prompting the German high command to send the three ships there on 3 May to safeguard German nationals in the country. They arrived in Valparaíso on 9 July and proceeded to visit other Chilean ports before returning to Valparaíso on 28 August. There, they sent landing parties ashore to protect Germans living in the city. After the war ended, Sophie and the other ships were able to leave for Cape Town before proceeding on to German East Africa in April 1892. The other two ships continued on without Sophie, which was left behind until 18 June, when she was ordered to return to Germany. She arrived in Wilhelmshaven on 24 July and was transferred to Danzig on 6 August, where she was decommissioned on 13 August.

=== Later career ===
In July 1895, Sophie was slated to become a dedicated training ship. She was transferred to Wilhelmshaven for the conversion work; while the work was underway, she was officially transferred to the list of training ships on 9 April 1897. Work on the ship was completed by 1 January 1898, when she was recommissioned. She thereafter took part in training cruises in the Baltic, and in August she began an extended training cruise abroad that went as far as Montevideo. She returned to Wilhelmshaven from the cruise on 24 March 1899, and she was decommissioned there for a final time on 7 April. The corvette Gneisenau was similarly converted, and was more suitable for the task than Sophie. On 21 May 1908 she was stricken from the naval register and thereafter was used as a barracks ship in Wilhelmshaven. On 1 August 1914, after the outbreak of World War I, she was transferred to the island of Helgoland in the German Bight; she remained there until 1916, when she was moved to Emden, still in use as a barracks. After the war, she was sold on 7 July 1920 and broken up the following year in Hamburg.
