= SMS Mars (1879) =

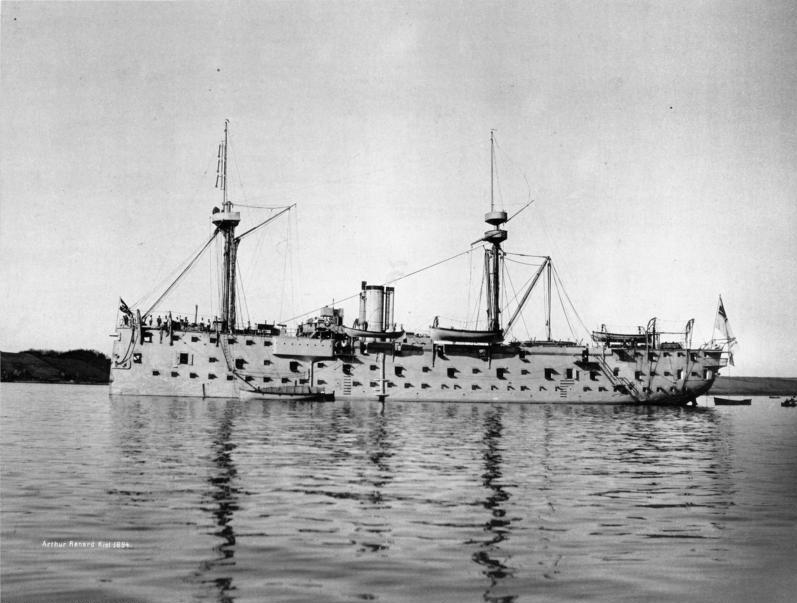
- Mars in 1894

History
- Name: Mars
- Builder: Kaiserliche Werft Wilhelmshaven
- Laid down: 1877
- Launched: 15 November 1879
- Commissioned: 1 March 1881

General characteristics
- Displacement: 3,542 t (3,486 long tons)
- Length: 85.3 m (280 ft)
- Beam: 15 m (49 ft)
- Draft: 5.92 m (19.4 ft)
- Propulsion: 1 × Marine steam engine
- Speed: 11.4 knots (21.1 km/h; 13.1 mph)
- Complement: 344–474

SMS Mars was an artillery training ship of the German Kaiserliche Marine (Imperial Navy), built in the late 1870s.

== Design ==
In the 1860s and 1870s, the German navy had three elderly ships that were used to train gunners for the fleet: Thetis, Gefion, and Renown; these ships were of increasingly little use, as their wooden hulls were ageing and the types of guns fitted were shifting into obsolescence. In addition, they had insufficient accommodations for the crew, instructional staff, and trainees. As a result, the navy realized by the mid-1870s that a new, purpose-built, iron-hulled gunnery training ship would be required, with design work for the new vessel being done in 1876. Since the ship would not be expected to be used in combat, her speed would not need to be high, and she would carry no armor protection. Her resemblance to contemporary broadside ironclad warships led to her being nicknamed the "rubber battleship". She nevertheless proved to be quite effective as a training ship.

=== Characteristics ===
Mars was 85.3 meters (280 ft) long, with a beam of 15 m (49 ft) and a draft of 5.92 m (19.4 ft). She displaced 3,542 metric tons (3,486 long tons; 3,904 short tons) at full load. The ship's crew varied over the course of her career, between 344 and 474 officers and enlisted men. She was powered by a single marine steam engine that drove one screw propeller and coal-fired boilers, both of which had been taken from Renown, which gave her a top speed of 11.4 knots (21.1 km/h; 13.1 mph) As built, she was equipped with a schooner rig, though this was later cut down, with the sailing rig only being used to provide stability.

== Service history ==
Construction of the new ship began with her keel laying in 1877. Mars was launched on 15 November 1879 at the Kaiserliche Werft (Imperial Shipyard) in Wilhelmshaven. After fitting-out work was completed, she was commissioned for sea trials on 1 March 1881. She was the first gunnery training ship built for the German navy. At the time, training was rather crude, with one test per year for each ship of the fleet, and the tests consisted of firing at targets 500, 1,500, and 2,500 meters (550, 1,640, and 2,730 yards) away. This would begin to be remedied only in 1885, when August von Thomsen was appointed the chief gunner for the fleet, and he began to improve the training regimen, particularly with regards to longer range fire. Mars completed her trials quickly, and was assigned to the North Sea Naval Station, though she was technically under the control of the gunnery officers at the Kaiserliche Admiralität (Imperial Admiralty). She began gunnery training in April 1881 in the Schillig roadstead just outside Wilhelmshaven. On 26 April, one of the 21 cm shells exploded aboard the ship, killing nine men and wounding another eighteen. At the end of the year, she returned to the inner harbor at Wilhelmshaven, where she remained for the winter.

Mars was initially supported by the old gunboat Fuchs, which served as her tender, though in 1882, Fuchs was replaced by the new gunboat Hay, followed by the torpedo boat Sicher in 1883. During this period, Franz von Hipper served aboard the ship from April to May 1882 for his Basic Gunnery School. On 1 October 1883, Mars was reassigned to the newly-formed Naval Artillery Inspectorate. In 1884, Mars was sent to tow the corvette Sophie back to Wilhelmshaven after she had been rammed and badly damaged by the Norddeutscher Lloyd steamer Hohenstaufen. On 31 August, the new Chief of the Admiralty, Leo von Caprivi, Konteradmiral (Rear Admiral) Eduard von Knorr, and Vizeadmiral (Vice Admiral) Wilhelm von Wickede—Caprivi's chief of staff and the commander of the Training Squadron, respectively—came aboard the ship for an inspection of recently built fortifications on the island of Wangerooge. Mars thereafter took part in the annual autumn fleet maneuvers in September, the first time she participated in them.
