= SMS Hay (1881) =

German gunboat of the 1880s

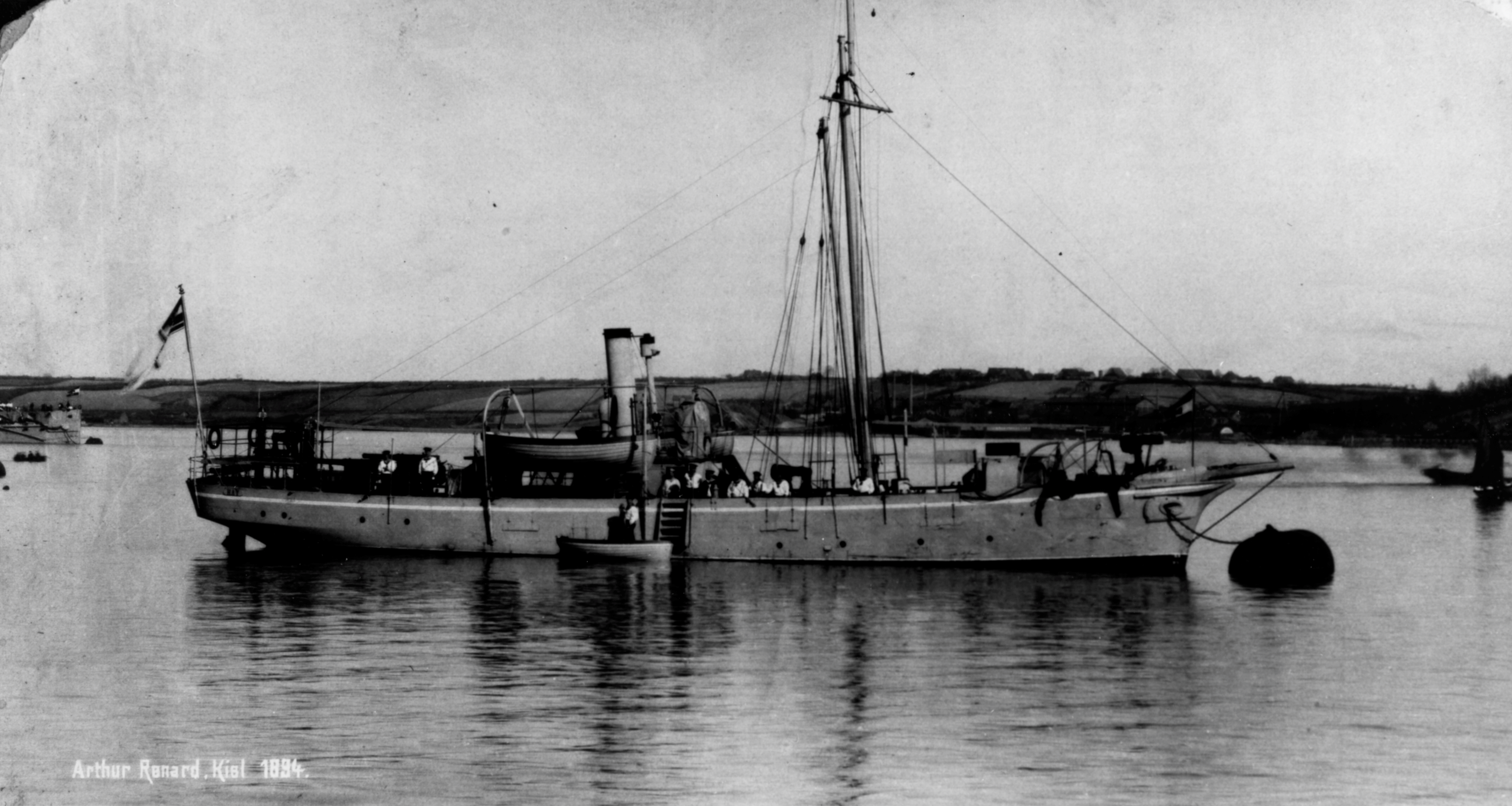
- Hay later in her career, c. 1894

Class overview
- Preceded by: Habicht class
- Succeeded by: Brummer class

History
- Name: Hay
- Operator: Imperial German Navy
- Builder: Kaiserliche Werft, Danzig
- Laid down: 1880
- Launched: 28 September 1881
- Commissioned: 15 June 1882
- Decommissioned: 14 May 1905
- Stricken: 5 May 1919
- Fate: Broken up

General characteristics
- Type: Steam gunboat
- Displacement: Full load: 247 t (243 long tons)
- Length: 34 m (111 ft 7 in)
- Beam: 6.4 m (21 ft)
- Draft: 2.25 m (7 ft 5 in)
- Installed power: 2 × fire-tube boilers; 202 PS (199 ihp)
- Propulsion: 1 × double-expansion steam engine; 1 × screw propeller
- Speed: 9.3 knots (17.2 km/h; 10.7 mph)
- Range: 2,400 nmi (4,400 km; 2,800 mi) at 5 kn (9.3 km/h; 5.8 mph)
- Complement: 2 officers; 38 enlisted men
- Armament: 4 × 8.7 cm (3.4 in) guns; 4 × 37 mm (1.5 in) Hotchkiss revolver cannon

SMS Hay was a small steam gunboat built by the German Kaiserliche Marine (Imperial Navy) in the early 1880s. She was intended to serve as a tender for the German fleet's artillery school. This saw the ship primarily used to tow targets for gunners aboard the training ship Mars to engage. As such, she was a small vessel, and carried a light armament. Hay served in this capacity from her commissioning in 1882 until 1906. During that period, beginning in 1892, she was also used to protect fishing grounds in German territorial waters. After being decommissioned in 1906, she was used as a target ship through World War I, and was sold to ship breakers in 1919.

== Design ==
By the late 1870s, the gunnery school for the Kaiserliche Marine (Imperial Navy) consisted of badly worn-out ships. The primary tender, the old steam gunboat Fuchs, was no longer serviceable and could not be economically repaired. The Reichstag (Imperial Diet) refused to grant money for a replacement tender, so the navy ordered a "II-class gunboat ersatz Habicht", (Note: German warships were ordered under provisional names. Additions to the fleet were given a single letter; ships intended to replace older or lost vessels were ordered as "Ersatz (name of the ship to be replaced)".) ostensibly a new gunboat to replace the older vessel of that name. The design for the new ship was prepared in 1880 and was ordered later that year.

=== Characteristics ===
Hay was 31.2 meters (102 ft 4 in) long at the waterline and 34 m (111 ft 7 in) long overall, with a beam of 6.4 m (21 ft). She had a draft of 2.25 m (7 ft 5 in) forward and 2.81 m (9 ft 3 in) aft, with a freeboard of 1.32 m (4 ft 4 in). She displaced 200 metric tons (197 long tons) as designed and 247 t (243 long tons) at full load. She had a carvel-built hull that was sheathed in copper and was divided into four watertight compartments. Steering was controlled via a single rudder. The ship was a good sea boat, particularly for a vessel of her small size. Hay's crew consisted of 2 officers and 38 enlisted men. She carried a pair of yawls and one dinghy.

She was powered by a double-expansion steam engine that drove a 4-bladed screw propeller, with steam provided by two coal-fired, cylindrical fire-tube boilers. The boilers were vented through a single funnel located amidships. Her propulsion system produced a top speed of 9.3 knots (17.2 km/h; 10.7 mph) at 202 metric horsepower (199 ihp). She could carry 15 t (14.8 long tons) of coal for her boilers. At a cruising speed of 5 knots (9.3 km/h; 5.8 mph), she could steam for 2,400 nautical miles (4,400 km; 2,800 mi), but at 9 knots (17 km/h; 10 mph), her radius of action fell to 680 nmi (1,260 km; 780 mi). While towing a target in calm seas, the ship could make between 2 and 5 knots (3.7 and 9.3 km/h; 2.3 and 5.8 mph), depending on the size of the target.

The ship was armed with a main battery of four 8.7 cm (3.4 in) K L/24 built-up guns in pivot mounts and four 37 mm (1.5 in) Hotchkiss revolver cannon. After 1891, the guns were replaced with a pair of 8.8 cm (3.5 in) SK L/30 quick-firing guns.

== Service history ==
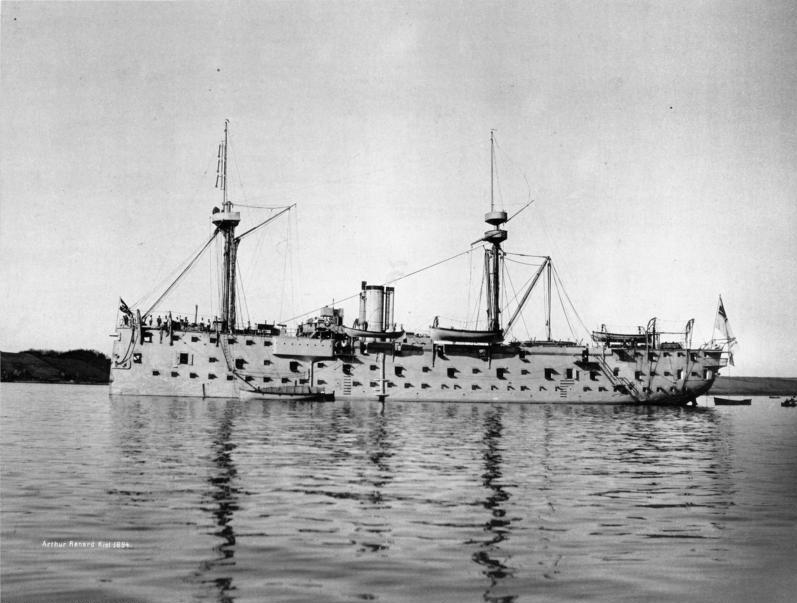
Mars, the primary gunnery training ship for most of Hay's career

The keel for Hay was laid down at the Kaiserliche Werft (Imperial Shipyard) in Danzig in early 1881. She was launched on 28 September 1881, and after being fitted out, was commissioned into active service on 15 June 1882. She was then moved to Wilhelmshaven, where she was assigned as the tender to the artillery school ship Mars. Her primary responsibility was towing targets during shooting practice aboard Mars. These exercises were carried out in the North Sea and in the western Baltic Sea. In September 1882, Hay was decommissioned for an overhaul, after which she was placed in reserve with a reduced crew. She returned to service on 3 April 1883 for shooting practice, and at that time her captain was Leutnant zur See (LzS—Lieutenant at Sea) Ernst Gülich. The year's training activities concluded for Hay on 28 September, when she was again laid up for the winter months. On 1 October, the naval command structure was reorganized, and Hay was assigned to the Naval Artillery Inspectorate.

Hay next recommissioned on 1 April 1884 for the training year that ended on 24 September. LzS Johannes Wallmann commanded the ship during this period. She was formally reclassified as a tender on 25 November. The 1885 training program, which lasted from 25 March to 30 November, saw Hay participate in the annual, large-scale fleet maneuvers. During the exercises, she served as part of a coastal defense fleet guarding Wilhelmshaven against a simulated naval attack. Hay returned to service on 1 March 1886 and was decommissioned again only on 24 December. The following year, she remained in service from 1 March 1887 through the end of the year, although her crew was reduced from December to February 1888. At that time, she came under the command of LzS Johannes Rieve. She remained in service until 15 December, when she was again laid up for the winter. 1889 would be the final year that would follow this pattern; she served from 15 March to 28 September, when she was briefly decommissioned. On 4 November, Hay returned to service, and she would remain in continuous commission for the next seventeen years.

In 1890, the ship took part in shooting practice in Strander Bucht. Her normal training activities were interrupted by a naval review later that year. Over the winter of 1890–1891, the ship had her armament replaced with the 8.8 cm guns. In March 1891, the ship came under the command of LzS Arthur Tapken. Beginning in 1892, Hay began to also serve as a fishery protection ship in the North Sea. From May to July, she operated in company with a new gunnery training ship, the screw corvette Carola. In September, LzS Ernst von Mann took command of Hay. LzS Heinrich Trendtel relieved him the following year, serving until September 1895. Beginning in 1896, the torpedo vessel Ulan joined Hay as a second tender for the gunnery school. In September that year, LzS Max Lans became Hay's captain. The next several years passed quietly for Hay, which was occupied with routine shooting practice and patrols through the fishing grounds of the North Sea. Other notable commanders, all leutnant zur see, during this period included William Michaelis from 1897 to 1898 and Max Looff from 1898 to 1899.

In 1905, the ship was assigned to operate with the new armored cruiser Prinz Adalbert, which was assigned to the gunnery school. Hay was decommissioned on 14 May 1905, and she was replaced by the new tender Delphin. Hay was struck from the list of warships on 28 September 1906 and allocated to the list of miscellaneous vessels. She was thereafter used as a target ship at Kiel-Friedrichsort, a role she filled through World War I. She was struck again on 5 May 1919 following Germany's defeat. Hay was then sold to ship breakers in Wewelsfleth.
