= Karl Eduard Heusner =

German naval officer (1843–1891)

State Secretary for the Navy
- In office 1 April 1889 – 22 April 1890
- Monarch: Wilhelm II
- Chancellor: Otto von Bismarck; Leo von Caprivi
- Preceded by: Position established
- Succeeded by: Friedrich von Hollmann

Personal details
- Born: Karl Eduard Heusner; 8 January 1843 Perl, Lower Rhine Province, Kingdom of Prussia
- Died: 27 February 1891 (aged 48) Weimar, Saxe-Weimar-Eisenach, German Empire
- Party: Independent

Military service
- Allegiance: Kingdom of Prussia; German Empire
- Branch/service: Prussian Navy; Imperial German Navy
- Years of service: 1857—1890
- Rank: Vizeadmiral (char.)
- Commands: SMS Oldenburg

Karl Eduard Heusner (8 January 1843 – 27 February 1891) was a German naval officer who held the rank of Vice Admiral in the Imperial German Navy. He served as State Secretary of the German Imperial Naval Office from 1889 to 1890 under Chancellors Otto von Bismarck and Leo von Caprivi.

Heusner was born in Perl (today in the German state of Saarland). He entered the Prussian Navy in 1857, and in 1859–1862 he took part in on an expedition to the Far East on the frigate Thetis. In 1864 during the Second Schleswig War he commanded the Prussian gunboat Wespe, which saw brief action at the Battle of Jasmund. Heusner then was in the following years stationed in the Mediterranean and the West Indies. In 1872 he did survey work in the Baltic Sea and in 1873 and was chairman of the Torpedo Examination Board or Torpedo Depot at Kiel-Friedrichsort where he and Otto von Diederichs worked on the Whitehead torpedo.

In 1877 he left the Torpedo Depot and was sent with Tirpitz to the Torpedo-Fabrik von Robert Whitehead at Fiume to further study the torpedo.

In 1878 to 1880 he was posted to South America to protect the interests of Germany during the War of the Pacific. Here he also supervised the observance of the neutrality laws. In 1882 Heusner was Chief (Dezernent) of Section A1 (Military Utilization of Ships/Militärische Verwendung der Schiffe) of the Admiralty's Military Department (Militärische Abteilung), which was headed by Eduard von Knorr. In March, von Knorr put him to develop 'Plan-O' for naval operations against Russia in case of war. His plan called for an attempt at a quick and decisive battle to cripple the Russian fleet, followed by the mining of ports and blockade by a screen of light warships. In 1883-87 he commanded the armored ships (Panzerschiffen) SMS Deutschland and SMS Oldenburg and then the squadrons off Australia and East Africa.

In 1888 Wilhelm II appointed him as Chief of the Navy Department (Marineabteilung) in the Admiralty and promoted him to Rear Admiral. In April 1889 he became Secretary of the German Imperial Naval Office in the Cabinet of Otto von Bismarck. He stayed on when Bismarck was replaced as chancellor by Leo von Caprivi, but soon had to resign because of heart disease, turning the office over to Friedrich von Hollmann.

He retired as a Vice Admiral, and died on 27 February 1891 in Weimar, Germany.

== Sources ==
- By order of the Kaiser: Otto von Diederichs and the rise of the Imperial German Navy, 1865-1902 by Terrell D. Gottschall; Institute Press, 2003, 337 pages.
- Hans H. Hildebrand; Ernest Harriot, eds. (1989). H-O. Vol. II. pp. 87–88.
