= Habicht-class gunboat =

Class of German gunboat of the 1870s

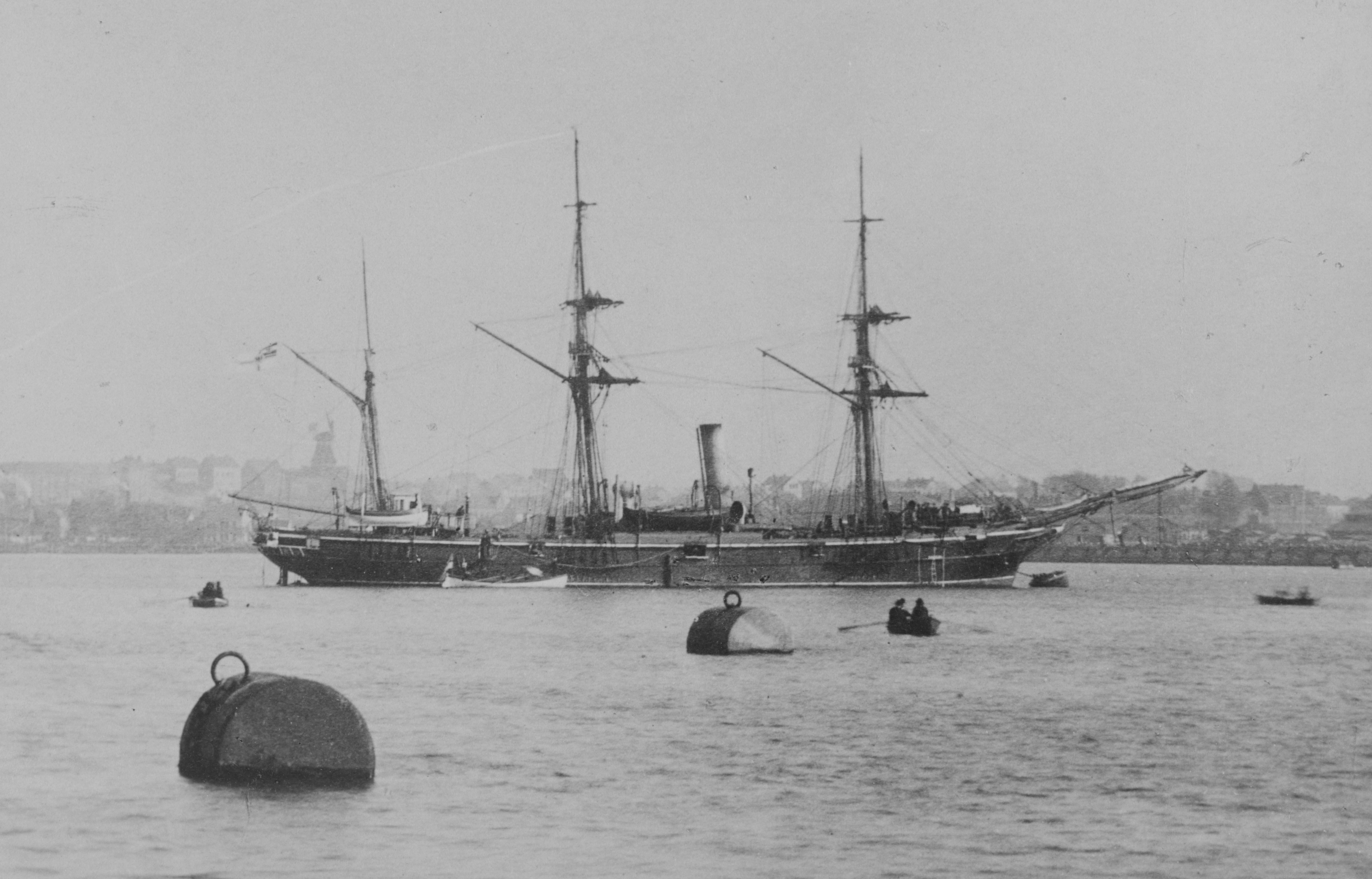
- Habicht probably in the 1880s

Class overview
- Preceded by: Wolf class
- Succeeded by: SMS Hay
- Built: 1878–1885
- In commission: 1880–1905
- Completed: 3
- Lost: 1
- Scrapped: 2

General characteristics
- Type: Steam gunboat
- Displacement: Design: 840 t (830 long tons); Full load: 1,005 t (989 long tons)
- Length: 59.2 m (194 ft 3 in)
- Beam: 8.9 m (29 ft 2 in)
- Draft: 3.52 m (11 ft 7 in)
- Installed power: 2 × fire-tube boilers; 600 PS (590 ihp)
- Propulsion: 1 × double-expansion steam engine; 1 × screw propeller
- Speed: 11 knots (20 km/h; 13 mph)
- Range: 2,010 nmi (3,720 km; 2,310 mi) at 9 kn (17 km/h; 10 mph)
- Complement: 6–7 officers; 121–126 enlisted men
- Armament: 1 × 15 cm (5.9 in) gun; 4 × 12 cm (4.7 in) guns

The Habicht class of steam gunboats was a class of three vessels built for the German Kaiserliche Marine (Imperial Navy) in the late 1870s and early 1880s. The class comprised Habicht, the lead ship, along with Möwe and Adler. Intended to serve abroad, the ships were ordered as part of a construction program intended to modernize Germany's fleet of cruising vessels in the mid-1870s. The Habicht class was armed with a battery of five guns, and was the first class of German gunboat to use compound steam engines. The ships had a top speed of 11 knots (20 km/h; 13 mph).

The ships of the class spent the bulk of their time in service cruising abroad; after entering service in 1880, Habicht and Möwe were sent to the Pacific, returning to Germany in 1882 by way of Egypt, where they protected German nationals during the Anglo-Egyptian War. In the mid-1880s, both ships were sent to Africa, where they supported the establishment of Germany's colonial empire in Africa. Adler was commissioned in 1886 for a deployment to the South Pacific, and she was destroyed in Samoa by the 1889 Apia cyclone.

Möwe was converted into a survey ship in 1889 and charted Germany's African colonies until 1894, when she was sent to map the country's Pacific colonies. In 1896, Habicht was sent on another deployment to western Africa, and she took part in the early stages of the Herero Wars in 1904. Both ships were taken out of service in 1905; Habicht was recalled to Germany, while Möwe could not make the lengthy voyage home. Instead, she was reduced to a hulk in Qingdao, China, where she remained until 1910 when she was sold for scrap. Habicht, meanwhile, was sold to ship breakers in 1906.

== Design ==
By the mid-1870s, the large screw frigates and screw corvettes that formed the backbone of the German cruiser force were beginning to need to be replaced. Some of these ships had been in service for twenty years, and in that time spent considerable periods on deployments overseas. To replace these older vessels, the German Kaiserliche Marine (Imperial Navy) ordered the six Carola-class corvettes and three Habicht-class gunboats. The first two ships—Habicht and Möwe—were ordered first under the 1878/1879 estimates, while the third ship, Adler, was added 1882 to a slightly modified design.

The three steam gunboats were the first vessels of the type to use compound steam engines, which increased speed and engine efficiency. The contract for the new engines was given to Schichau-Werke in part to stimulate the development of the technology for future vessels. The ships' higher speed resulted in a change of classification during construction, from gunboat to aviso, since some officers believed their speed would allow them to serve as scouts for the main battle fleet, though they never served in this role. They were instead reclassified as gunboats by 1881.

=== Characteristics ===
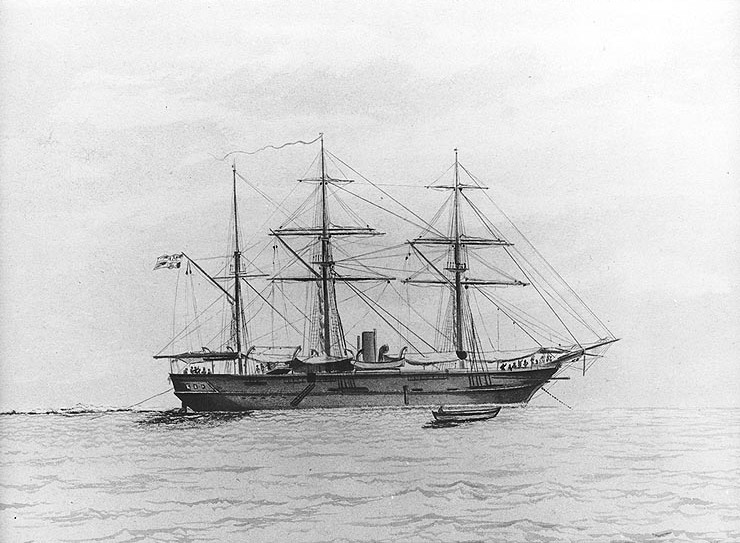
Sketch of Adler

The first two ships of the Habicht class were 59.2 meters (194 ft 3 in) long overall, with a beam of 8.9 m (29 ft 2 in) and a draft of 3.52 m (11 ft 7 in) forward. They displaced 840 metric tons (830 long tons) as designed and 1,005 t (989 long tons) at full load. Adler differed slightly in dimensions, being 58.1 m (190 ft 7 in) long at the waterline and 61.8 m (202 ft 9 in) overall. Her beam was reduced slightly, to 8.8 m (28 ft 10 in), and draft reduced to 3.11 m (10 ft 2 in) forward and 4.02 m (13 ft 2 in) aft. Her displacement increased slightly to 880 t (870 long tons) as designed and 1,040 t (1,020 long tons) at full load.

Their hulls were constructed with transverse iron frames and were divided into nine watertight compartments. Wooden hull planks were sheathed with zinc to protect the ships from marine biofouling during extended voyages abroad. The ships' crew varied over the course of their careers, and consisted of 6–7 officers and 121–126 enlisted men. Each vessel carried a number of small boats, including one picket boat, one pinnace, two cutters, one yawl, and one dinghy. The ships handled well under sail, they were maneuverable, and were very responsive to commands from the wheel. Steering was controlled with a single rudder.

They were powered by a double-expansion steam engine that drove a 2-bladed screw propeller, which was 3.23 m (10.6 ft) in diameter for the first two ships, but Adler received a slightly smaller 2.8 m (9 ft 2 in) wide screw. Steam was provided by two coal-fired, cylindrical fire-tube boilers aboard the first two ships, while Adler received four boilers. Exhaust was vented through a single funnel located amidships. To supplement the steam engine on long voyages, the ships were fitted with a schooner sailing rig that had 847 m^{2} (9,120 sq ft) of surface area. While cruising under sail, the screw could be raised.

The ships' propulsion system was rated to produce a top speed of 11 knots (20 km/h; 13 mph) at 600 metric horsepower (590 ihp), though Adler's additional boilers increased power to 700 PS (690 ihp). All three ships exceeded that speed in service, reaching between 11.3 and 11.7 knots (20.9 and 21.7 km/h; 13.0 and 13.5 mph) on their sea trials. The first two ships carried 100 t (98 long tons; 110 short tons) of coal, while Adler could carry 110 t (108 long tons; 121 short tons). At a cruising speed of 9 knots (17 km/h; 10 mph), they could steam for 2,010 nautical miles (3,720 km; 2,310 mi).

Illustration of Möwe in the South Pacific

The ships were armed with a single breech-loading 15 cm (5.9 in) RK L/22 built-up gun, which supplied from a magazine with 115 shells. They also carried four breech-loading 12 cm (4.7 in) K L/23 built-up guns, which were supplied with a total of 440 rounds of ammunition. In the early 1880s, the ships' armament was standardized on a uniform battery of five 12.5 cm (4.9 in) K L/23 built-up guns and five 37 mm (1.5 in) Hotchkiss revolver cannon. The 12.5 cm guns were supplied with a total of 620 shells, and had a maximum range of 5,600 m (18,400 ft). In 1890, when Möwe was converted into a survey ship, her main battery was reduced to two 12.5 cm guns, though those were eventually removed as well, leaving her armed with just the revolver cannon.

== Ships ==
Construction data
Ship	Builder	Laid down	Launched	Commissioned
Habicht	Schichau-Werke, Elbing	1878	13 May 1879	18 March 1880
Möwe	Schichau-Werke, Elbing	1878	8 October 1879	31 May 1880
Adler	Königlich Werft, Kiel	1882	3 November 1883	27 May 1885

== Service history ==
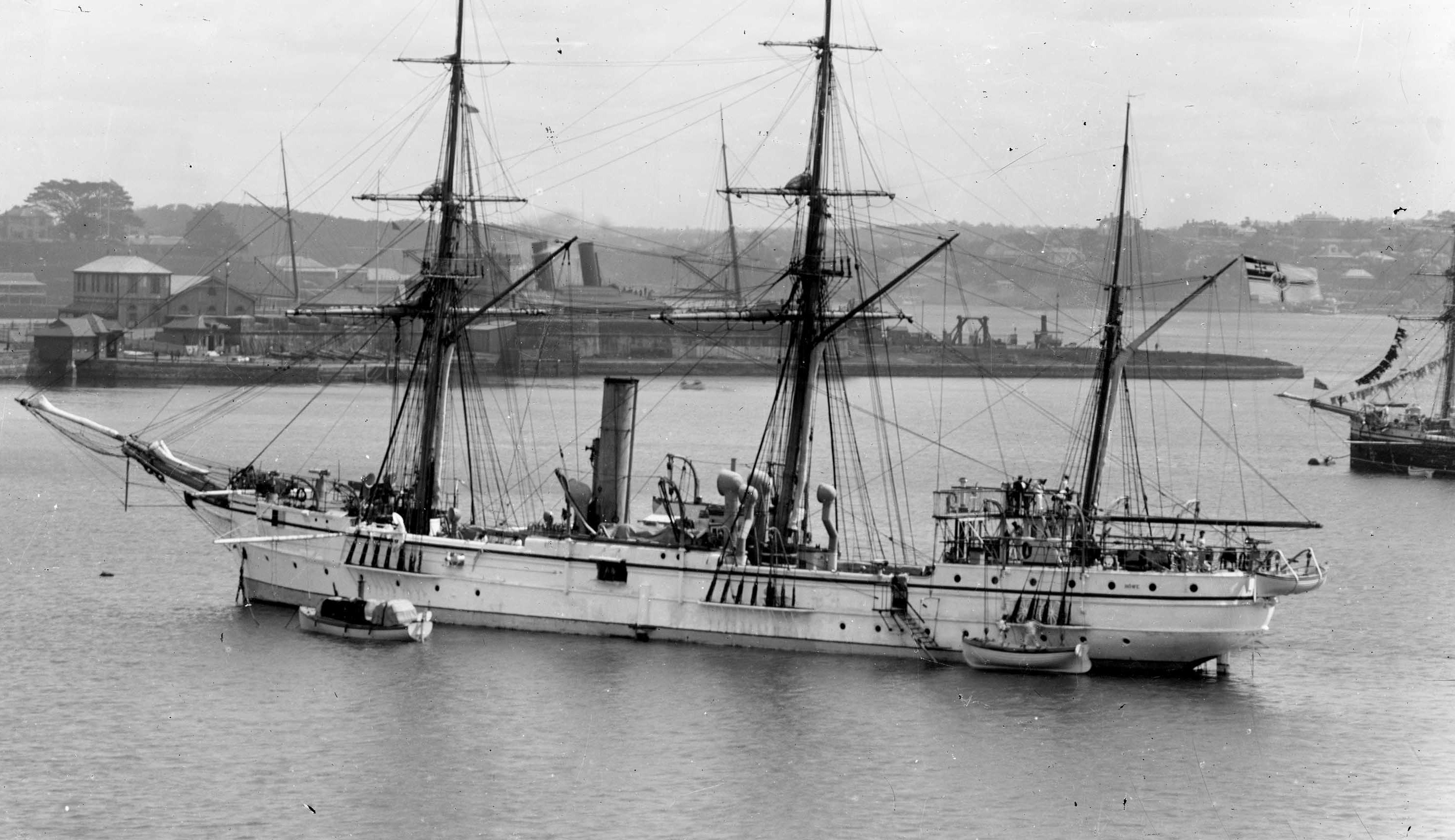
Möwe in Sydney, Australia

The ships of the Habicht class spent the majority of their careers on cruises abroad. After entering service in 1880, Habicht and Möwe were deployed to the South Pacific to protect German economic interests in the region, particularly in Samoa, the Marshall Islands, and the Solomon Islands. During their return to Germany in 1882, they were diverted to Egypt in response to the Anglo-Egyptian War to protect German citizens in the country. A second major deployment for Möwe followed, this time to Africa in 1884; she was joined there by Habicht the following year. Möwe was involved in the establishment of the German colonial empire in German West Africa, carrying the imperial commissioner, Gustav Nachtigal, to establish formal colonial treaties in Togoland and Kamerun. Later in 1885, Möwe moved to German East Africa, where she assisted in the suppression of the Abushiri revolt in 1888. Habicht remained in West African waters until 1892, when she returned to Germany.

Adler first commissioned in 1886 for a deployment to the South Pacific. She initially cruised in German New Guinea, before moving to Samoa in 1887. Over the next two years, she patrolled the islands to defend Germans in the area, and in late 1887, she carried the deposed king Malietoa Laupepa into exile. The next year, members of her crew and those of German vessels Eber and Olga fought in the First Battle of Vailele, where they were ambushed by a significantly larger Samoan force and suffered heavy casualties. On 16 March 1889, Adler, Eber, and Olga were anchored in Apia, Samoa, along with three American warships and several other merchant vessels when a major hurricane struck the islands. All of the ships in the harbor were wrecked, including Adler, which was driven into a reef and destroyed. Twenty men from her crew were killed in the sinking, though Samoans rescued the remainder.

In 1889, Möwe was converted into a survey ship, and in that guise she began her final overseas voyage in 1890. She initially sailed to German East Africa and worked off the coast for the next four years. In 1894, she moved to the South Pacific to begin surveying the colonies in German New Guinea, Micronesia, and Melanesia. Habicht remained in reserve until 1896, when she was recommissioned for another cruise off West Africa. This deployment lasted until 1905, and passed relatively uneventfully, until the outbreak of the Herero Wars German South West Africa in 1904. Habicht was the first unit to arrive to reinforce the Schutztruppe in the colony, and her captain initially assumed command of the units fighting in the colony. The ship's landing parties saw repeated combat until being relieved as more significant forces arrived in the colony. Habicht was recalled to Germany in 1905, where she was quickly struck from the naval register and sold to ship breakers in 1906. Möwe was also worn out by 1905, and she was unable to return to Germany. Instead, she sailed to the German naval base in Qingdao, China, where she was hulked. In 1910, she was sold and subsequently broken up.
