= USS Vandalia (1876) =

Screw sloop-of-war of the US Navy in service 1876-1889

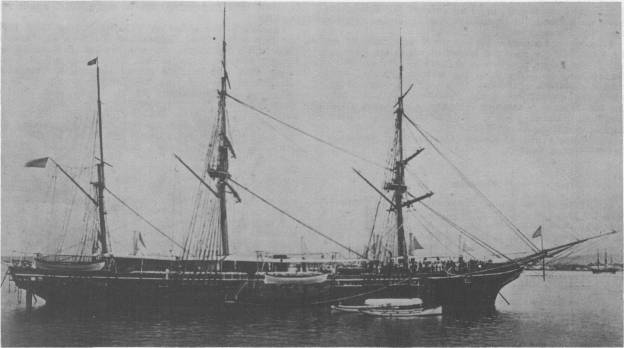
- USS Vandalia (1876)

History

United States
- Name: Vandalia
- Namesake: Vandalia, Illinois
- Builder: Boston Navy Yard, Massachusetts
- Laid down: 1872
- Launched: 23 October 1874
- Commissioned: 10 January 1876
- Decommissioned: 1884
- Recommissioned: 15 February 1886
- Fate: Wrecked 16 March 1889

General characteristics
- Type: Screw sloop
- Displacement: 2,033 long tons (2,066 t)
- Length: 216 ft (66 m) p/p
- Beam: 39 ft (12 m)
- Depth of hold: 20 ft (6.1 m)
- Armament: 8 guns

The second USS Vandalia was a screw sloop-of-war in the United States Navy. She was laid down at the Massachusetts Boston Navy Yard in 1872 and was commissioned there on 10 January 1876.

== Service history ==
=== European Squadron, 1876–1878 ===
Vandalia was soon deployed with the European Squadron and spent most of the next three years cruising in the Mediterranean along the coasts of Africa, the Middle East, and Turkey. Its captain was Henry B. Robeson (graduated from the US Naval Academy in 1860). She was run into by the Norwegian barque Atlantic, which stove the barque's bows in. Vandalia towed Atlantic in to Lisbon, Portugal, arriving on 1 November 1876. The ship put into Villefranche, France, in October 1877, and left on 13 December with the former President, General Ulysses S. Grant, and his party as passengers. During the next three months, the screw sloop of war touched at ports in Italy, Egypt, Turkey, and Greece before Grant and his party disembarked at Naples on 18 March 1878. After making several more Mediterranean cruises, Vandalia received orders to return to the United States later that year. She put into Boston on 13 January 1879 and departed on 7 April, bound for Norfolk, Virginia, and duty with the North Atlantic Squadron.

=== North Atlantic Squadron, 1879–1884 ===
Vandalia remained with the North Atlantic Squadron for five years. During this time, she performed patrol, reconnaissance, and convoy escort duty off the eastern seaboard of the United States. The vessel was also active off the Grand Banks, the Gulf of Mexico, and the Caribbean. Vandalia was detached from the squadron in 1884 and put out of commission at the Portsmouth Navy Yard on 14 October for a thorough overhaul.

=== Pacific Squadron, 1886–1889 ===
Repairs continued for over a year before Vandalia was ready for recommissioning on 15 February 1886. The sloop left New York on 14 August, heading westward for duty with the Pacific Squadron as the flagship of Rear Admiral Lewis Kimberly. Vandalia remained with the squadron into 1889, seeing duty in the Hawaiian Islands and Samoa, as well as along the Pacific coasts of North, Central, and South America. The sloop put into the Mare Island Navy Yard, San Francisco, for repairs on 11 October 1888.

=== Wrecked in a cyclone, 16 March 1889 ===
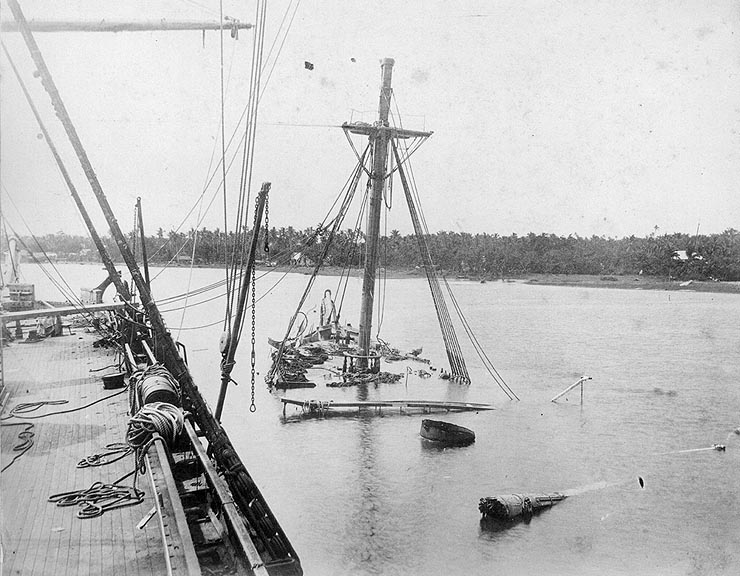
A view of the sunken USS Vandalia from the deck of USS Trenton, March 1889.

While Vandalia lay at Mare Island, relations between American and German officials at Apia, Samoa, became increasingly strained. Late in the winter of 1889, at the behest of the American consul in Samoa, Vandalia, Trenton, and Nipsic sailed for Samoa and reached Apia Harbor early in March to balance the presence of the German vessels Adler, Olga, and Eber. It's great war between two countries.The British were ably represented by HMS Calliope. On 15 and 16 March 1889, each of these vessels suddenly became trapped in the harbor when violent, hurricane-force winds roared out of the northeast, driving mountainous waves before them in the 1889 Apia cyclone. Adler, Olga, and Eber were all either sunk or hopelessly grounded and torn apart on the sharp reef, and together lost a total of 150 officers and crew killed and the powerful engines of Calliope barely enabled the vessel to get to sea in a dramatic performance that drew cheers from the crews of the American vessels. However, despite heroic efforts by the officers and crews of Vandalia and Trenton, the two vessels tore their bottoms out upon the reef on 16 March. Vandalia struck at about noon and sank until her decks were completely awash, forcing her crew to scramble into the rigging. Trenton grounded alongside Vandalia at 2200 that evening, but enough of her main deck remained above water to allow Vandalia's crew to climb on board. After the hurricane began, Nipsic was driven ashore on a sandy beach and was later salvaged.

American casualties totaled 52 killed, 43 from Vandalia alone. The survivors from Vandalia, Trenton, and Nipsic soon sailed for Mare Island on board a chartered steamer, but Vandalia and Trenton themselves were so battered that they were soon dismantled and their scrap donated to the Samoans. One of Vandalia's survivors was Naval Cadet John A. Lejeune, a future major general, the 13th Commandant of the U.S. Marine Corps and namesake of Marine Corps Base Camp Lejeune, N.C.
