= SMS Hyäne =

There were two ships in the Prussian Navy and later German Imperial Navy named SMS Hyäne:

- SMS Hyäne (1860) - a Jäger-class gunboat launched in 1860
- SMS Hyäne (1878) - a Habicht-class gunboat launched in 1878
