= SMS Adler =

Habicht-class gunboat, launched 1883

Coordinates: 13.8266°S 171.7647°W

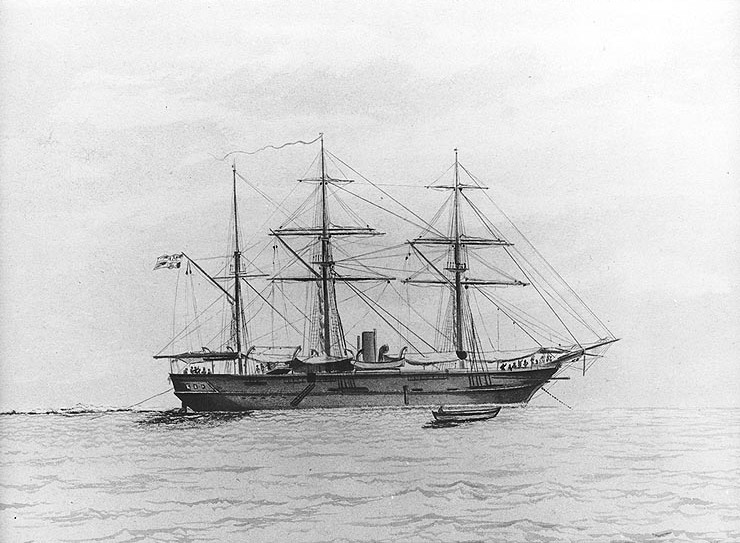
- Drawing of SMS Adler by Rear Admiral Lewis Kimberly, U.S. Navy

History

German Empire
- Name: SMS Adler
- Namesake: German word for "eagle"
- Operator: Imperial German Navy
- Builder: Kaiserliche Werft Kiel
- Laid down: 1882
- Launched: 3 November 1883
- Commissioned: 27 May 1885
- Fate: Wrecked, 16 March 1889

General characteristics
- Class & type: Habicht-class gunboat
- Displacement: Full load: 1,040 t (1,020 long tons)
- Length: 61.8 m (202 ft 9 in)
- Beam: 8.8 m (28 ft 10 in)
- Draft: 3.11 m (10 ft 2 in)
- Installed power: 2 × fire-tube boilers; 700 PS (690 ihp)
- Propulsion: 1 × double-expansion steam engine; 1 × screw propeller
- Speed: 11 knots (20 km/h; 13 mph)
- Range: 2,000 nmi (3,700 km; 2,300 mi) at 9 kn (17 km/h; 10 mph)
- Complement: 6–7 officers; 121–126 enlisted men
- Armament: 1 × 15 cm (5.9 in) gun; 4 × 12 cm (4.7 in) guns

SMS Adler was the third and final Habicht-class steam gunboat built for the German Kaiserliche Marine (Imperial Navy) in the early 1880s. Intended to serve abroad, the ship was ordered as part of a construction program intended to modernize Germany's fleet of cruising vessels in the mid-1870s. The Habicht class was armed with a battery of five guns, and was the first class of German gunboat to use compound steam engines. The ship had a top speed of 11 knots (20 km/h; 13 mph).

Adler was completed in 1884 and spent the next two years in reserve. In 1886, she was activated for a deployment to the South Pacific. She initially cruised off German New Guinea, before moving to Samoa in 1887. Over the next two years, she patrolled the islands to defend ethnic Germans in the area, and in late 1887, she carried the deposed king of Samoa Malietoa Laupepa into exile. Next year, members of her crew and those of German vessels Eber and Olga fought in the First Battle of Vailele, where they were ambushed by a significantly larger Samoan force and suffered heavy casualties.

On 16 March 1889, Adler, Eber, and Olga were anchored in Apia, Samoa, along with three American warships and several other merchant vessels when a major hurricane struck the island. All of the ships in the harbor were wrecked, including Adler, which was driven into a reef and destroyed. Twenty men from her crew were killed, although Samoans rescued the remainder. Her wreck was never removed and was used as a local recreational swimming site.

== Design ==
By the mid-1870s, the large screw frigates and screw corvettes that formed the backbone of the German cruiser force needed to be replaced. Some of these ships had been in service for twenty years and spent considerable periods on deployments overseas. To replace these older vessels, the German Kaiserliche Marine (Imperial Navy) ordered six Carola-class corvettes and three Habicht-class steam gunboats. The three gunboats were the first vessels of the type to use compound steam engines, which increased speed and engine efficiency.

Adler was 61.8 meters (202 ft 9 in) long overall, with a beam of 8.8 m (28 ft 10 in) and a draft of 3.11 m (10 ft 2 in) forward. She displaced 880 metric tons (870 long tons) as designed and 1,040 t (1,020 long tons) at full load. The ship's crew consisted of 6–7 officers and 121–126 enlisted men. She was powered by a double-expansion steam engine that drove a 2-bladed screw propeller, with steam provided by four coal-fired, cylindrical fire-tube boilers. Her propulsion system was rated to produce a top speed of 11 knots (20 km/h; 13 mph) at 700 metric horsepower (690 ihp), but she reached 11.3 knots (20.9 km/h; 13.0 mph) in service. At a cruising speed of 9 knots (17 km/h; 10 mph), she could steam for 2,000 nautical miles (3,700 km; 2,300 mi). To supplement the steam engine on long voyages, the ships were fitted with a schooner sailing rig. While cruising under sail, the screw could be raised.

The ship was armed with a single 15 cm (5.9 in) RK L/22 built-up gun, which was supplied from a magazine with 115 shells. She also carried four 12 cm (4.7 in) K L/23 built-up guns, which were supplied with a total of 440 rounds of ammunition. By 1882, the ship's armament had been standardized on a uniform battery of five 12.5 cm (4.9 in) K L/23 built up guns and five 37 mm (1.5 in) Hotchkiss revolver cannon.

== Service history ==
Adler, the last member of the Habicht class, was laid down in 1882 at the Kaiserliche Werft (Imperial Shipyard) in Kiel under the provisional designation "Ersatz Comet". (Note: German warships were ordered under provisional names. Additions to the fleet were given a single letter; ships intended to replace older or lost vessels were ordered as "Ersatz (name of the ship to be replaced)".) She was launched on 3 November 1883. After fitting out work was completed, the ship was commissioned on 27 May 1884 to begin sea trials. These lasted until 11 October 1884, when the ship was decommissioned and placed in reserve. The ship was recommissioned on 4 May 1886 for a deployment to the South Pacific to protect German economic interests in the region. She left Germany on 27 May, and by August, had reached Singapore, where the ship paused for a time to rest the crew. From there, she sailed to Cooktown, Australia, and then turned north to the Solomon Islands. The northern section of these islands had recently been allocated to Germany during negotiations with Britain, and Adler participated in the flag raising on the island of Choiseul Island. The ship visited a number of islands in the area and then sailed to Matupi Harbor, the main port on the island of Neupommern. The ship spent much of the rest of the year cruising through German New Guinea, and during this period sailed to the town of Kapsu to punish those responsible for the murder of a German trader on the island. She also conducted surveys along the coast of Kaiser-Wilhelmsland.

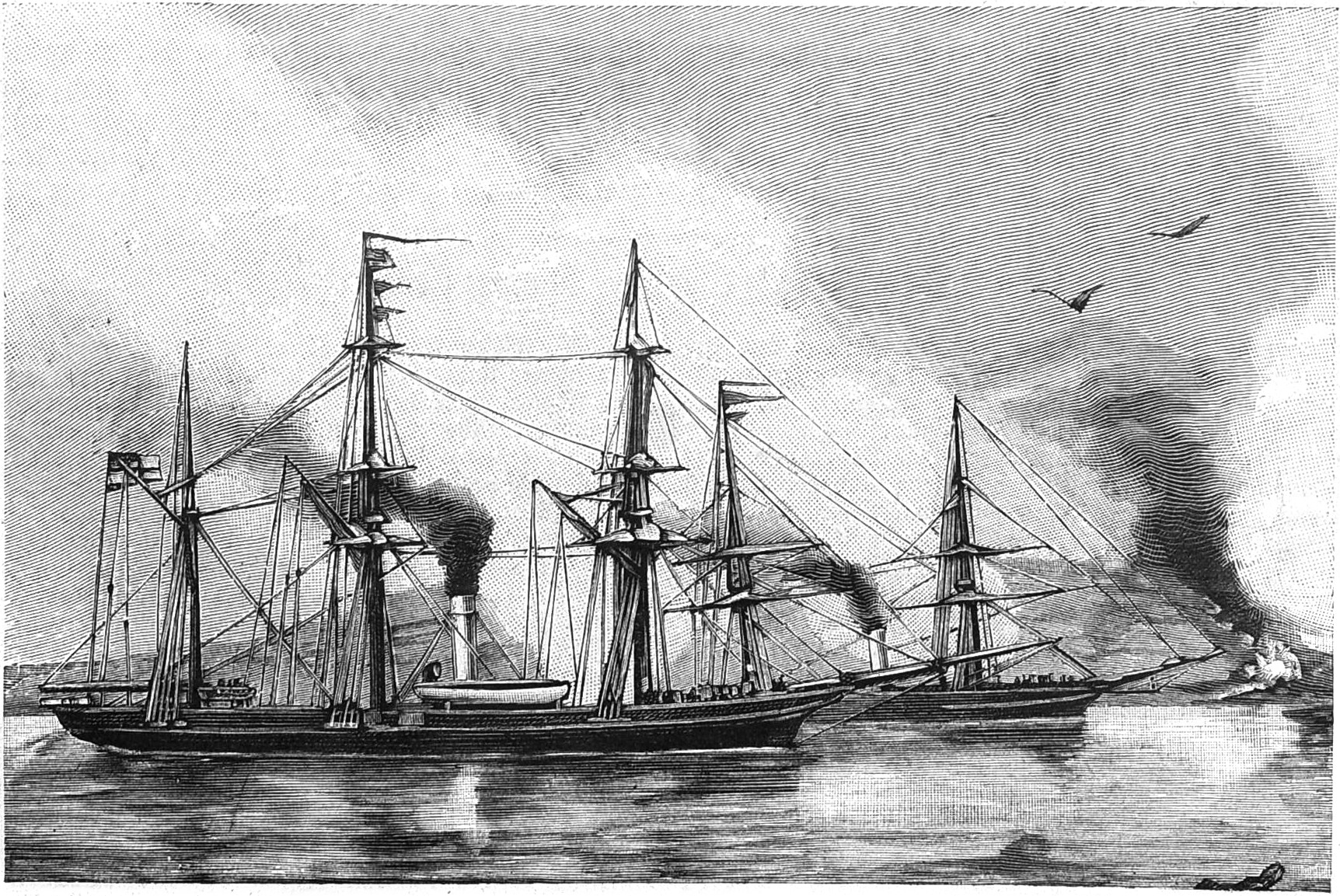
Eber (left) and Adler (right) off Samoa

On 15 January 1887, the gunboat Albatross arrived to relieve Adler in German New Guinea, allowing the latter to depart in early February for Sydney, Australia. There, she underwent periodic maintenance and half of her crew were replaced. Under way again on 20 April, Adler sailed north for Samoa; she anchored in Apia on 25 May, where she began charting Samoan waters. These operations were interrupted on 12 July, when the ship received orders to join the German cruiser squadron in Sydney. By the time she arrived, however, Samoans led by Malietoa Laupepa had begun significant attacks on Germans in the islands, which prompted the other ships to sail for Samoa. Adler was in need of repairs by that point, and so she was docked instead and another contingent from her crew was replaced. She arrived back in Apia on 13 September, and by that time the German cruiser squadron had captured Laupepa. The Germans decided to banish him to the colony of Kamerun in western Africa, and Adler took him and three other leaders of the attacks to Cooktown, where they were transferred to Albatross for the remainder of the journey. Adler arrived back in Apia on 22 November. The cruiser squadron departed in December, leaving Adler and the screw corvette Olga as the only vessels in the region, until the gunboat Eber arrived in Samoa in April 1888.

Renewed unrest in Samoa in 1888 prompted the Germans to cancel a planned cruise to the Marshall Islands for Adler, and to concentrate Olga and Eber with her there. In July, Adler was detached to replace her crew, and at that time, Korvettenkapitän (Corvette Captain) Ernst Fritze arrived to take command of the ship. Repeated, heavy attacks in November prompted all three ships to send landing parties ashore to defend Germans on the islands. In the First Battle of Vailele on 18 December, a force of 3,000 Samoans ambushed 220 Germans on the island of Upolu. In the course of the fighting, fifteen Germans were killed and another forty-one were wounded. The victorious Samoans mutilated the corpses of the Germans, prompting public outrage in Germany demanding an immediate annexation of the island. British and American forces also present in the islands strongly opposed German actions, and the American sloop USS Nipsic nearly opened fire on Adler and Eber during the battle at Vailele. Eber was then detached to sail to Auckland, New Zealand, to request reinforcements from Germany, as there was no direct telegraph line on the island.

=== Loss ===
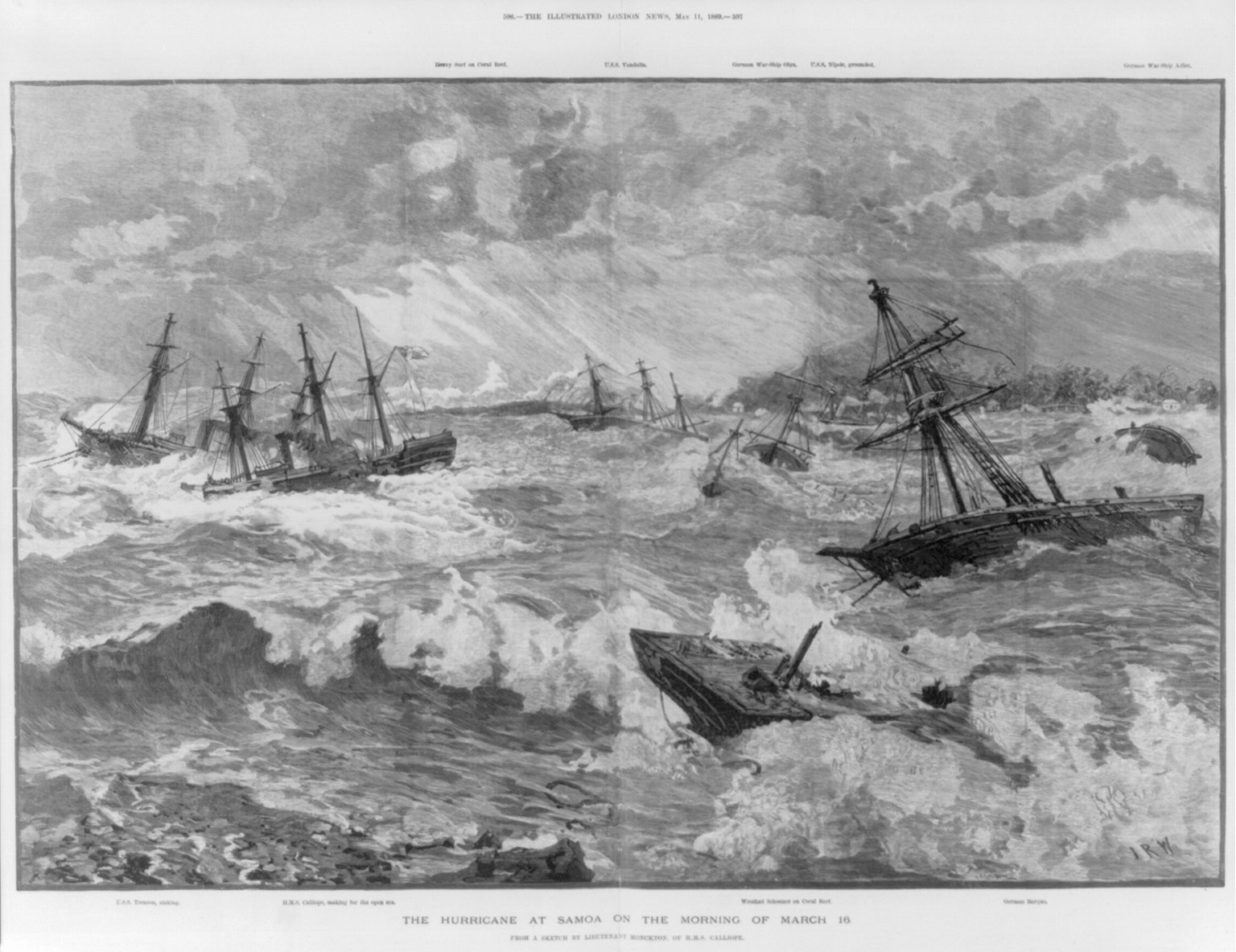
Artist's depiction of the hurricane striking the harbor

In mid-March 1889, the weather turned precipitously bad as a powerful hurricane approached the islands. Fritze, who was the senior-most German officer of the three ships, believed he could not leave the islands to avoid the storm, since doing so would leave the Germans living there unprotected against further violence. As the weather worsened, the Germans took precautions, including removing the yards, dropping additional anchors, and keeping the boilers lit in case the ships would need to move immediately. On the night of 15–16 March, the storm struck the island, sending powerful waves ashore, which battered the ships. At around 04:00 on 16 March, Adler's anchor chains broke, and she began drifting toward the shore. She lightly struck Olga, and continued to drift toward the island. At around 05:30, Fritze, who had been seriously injured, ordered the crew to put out the fires in the boilers to avoid a boiler explosion. About fifteen minutes later, Adler was driven onto the coral reef and rolled onto her port side. Twenty men were killed in the incident; the survivors were stranded on the reef until Samoans could rescue them by boat. The German consul offered payment both for each survivor brought to shore, along with a reduced amount for the bodies of those who died.

Most of the other ships in the harbor were similarly destroyed; only the British corvette HMS Calliope survived, as her captain had departed to avoid the storm. The American vessels in the harbor—Nipsic, the sloop USS Vandalia, and the screw frigate USS Trenton—were wrecked or beached, and Olga was also driven ashore. The incident defused the tensions between the Germans and Americans, however, as the survivors had to work together to recover from the disaster. Over the following days, the survivors from Adler worked to recover bodies and salvage usable equipment from the wreck, particularly the ship's guns. Some of the men were taken by Olga to Sydney, where they transferred to the Norddeutscher Lloyd steamer SS Braunschweig to return home. The rest embarked on the steamer SS Lübeck for the voyage home, transferring to the transport ship SS Habsburg during the journey. Adler's wreck was reportedly sold to a US ship breaking firm, but the ship was never removed, and was used as a recreational swimming site. It eventually broke apart entirely after decades of wave action.

Wreck of SMS Adler

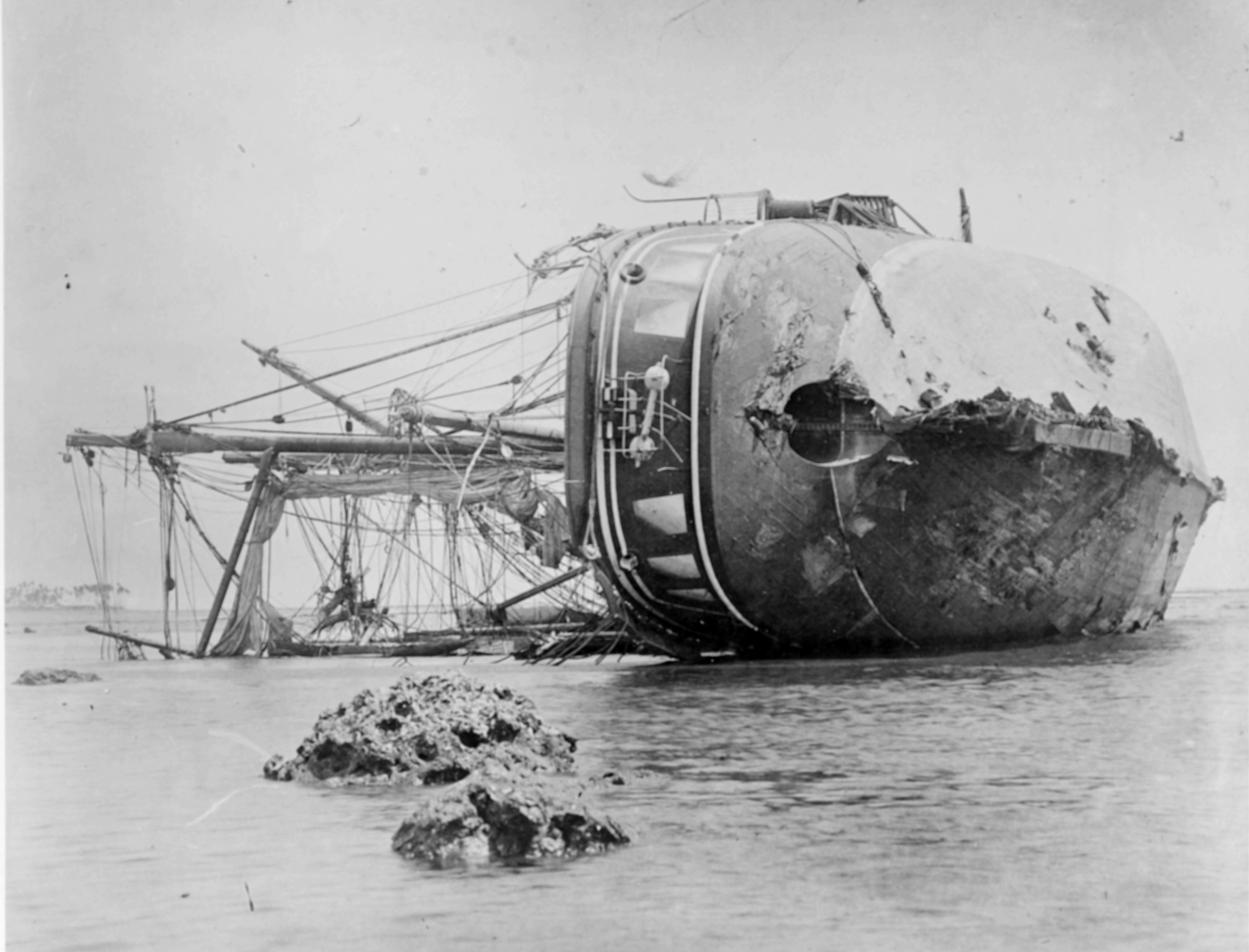
Adler after she keeled over and driven aground by the cyclone

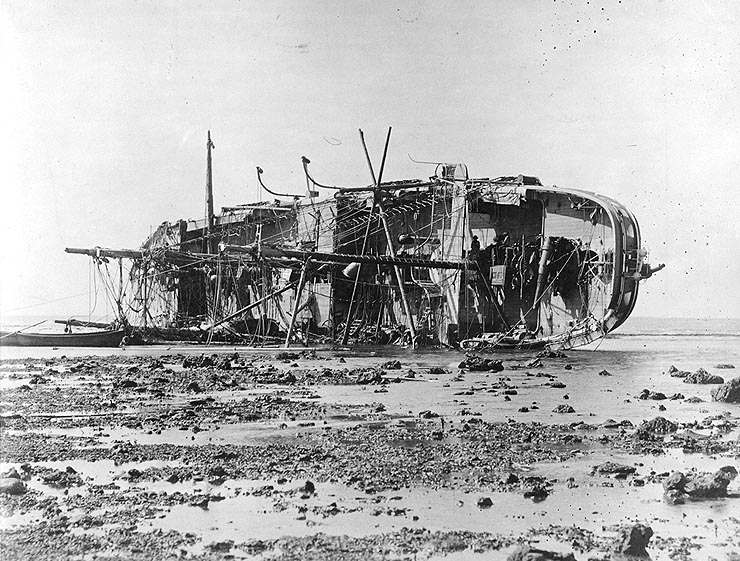
Adler's wreck from another view, showing her deck and rigging

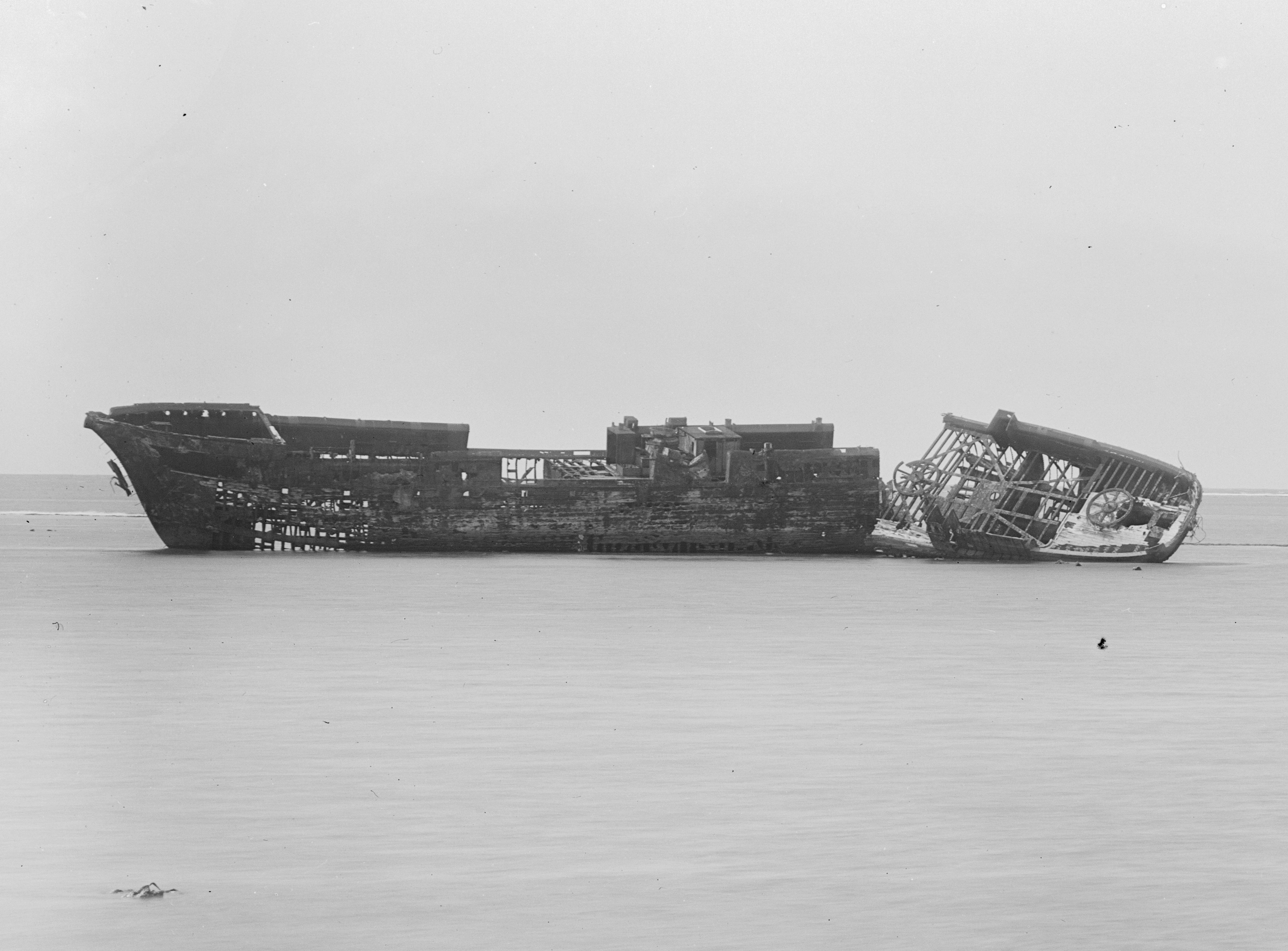
The wreck in 1903

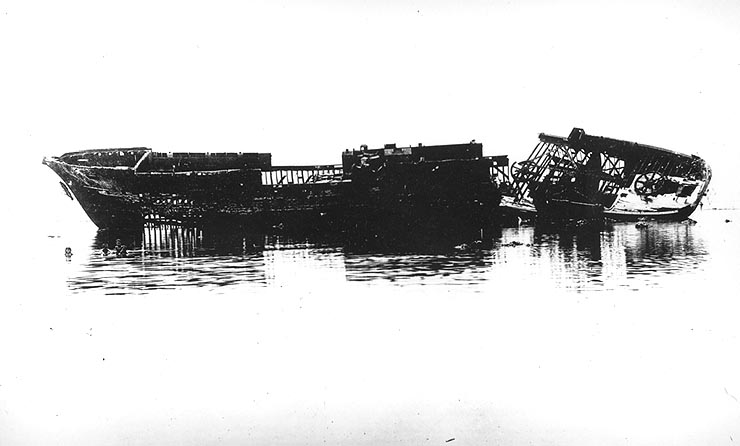
The wreck about 1938
