= Battle of Vailele =

Battle of Vailele may refer to:

- First Battle of Vailele
- Second Battle of Vailele
- Third Battle of Vailele
