= USS Nipsic =

Gunboat of the United States Navy

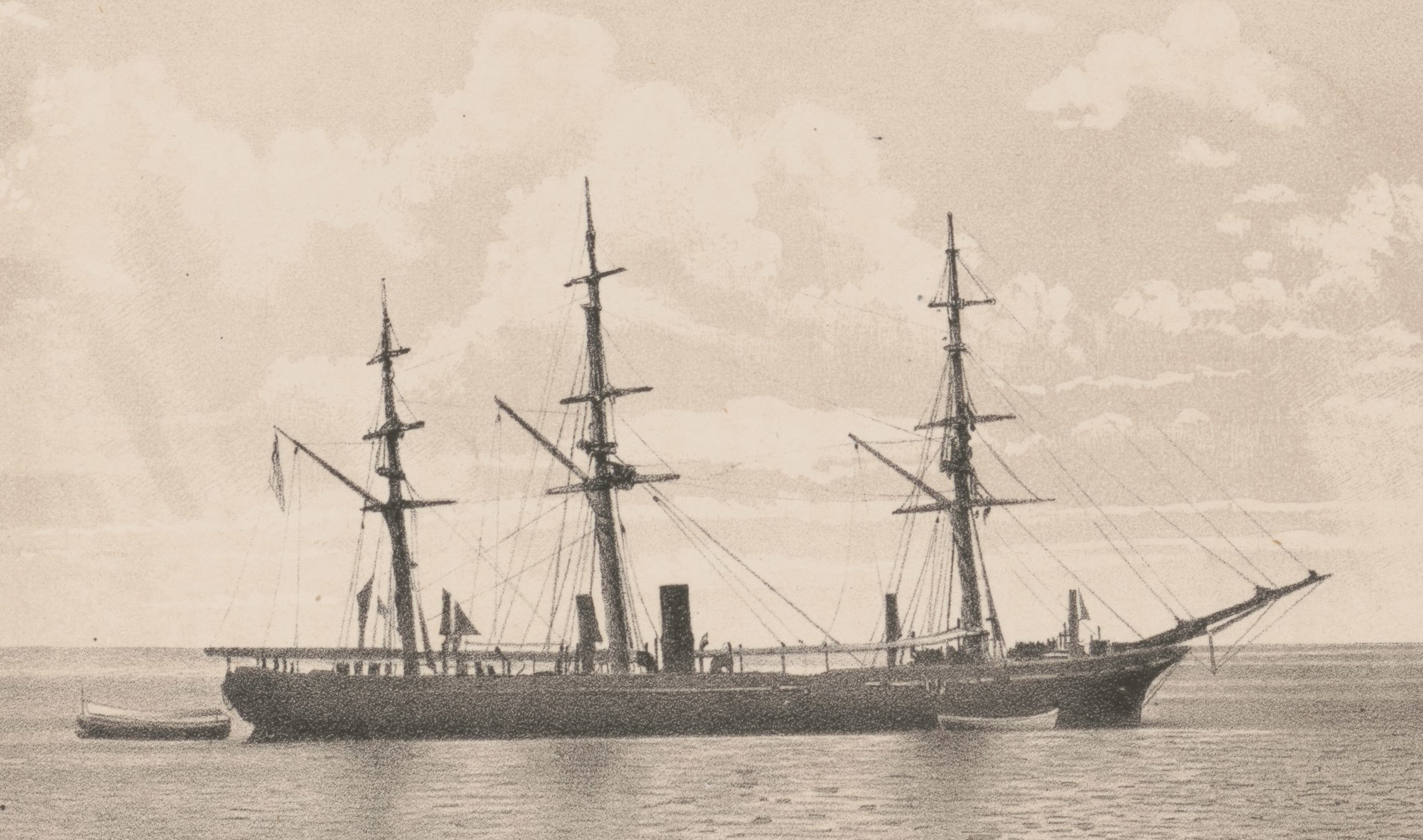
- Nipsic at the Atrato River in Colombia

History

United States
- Name: USS Nipsic
- Laid down: 24 December 1862
- Launched: 15 June 1863
- Commissioned: 2 September 1863
- Decommissioned: 1873
- Refit: Broken up and rebuilt between 1873-1879
- Recommissioned: 11 October 1879
- Decommissioned: 2 October 1890
- Refit: Rebuilt and extended, 1889-1890
- Fate: Burned for salvage, late 1915.

General characteristics
- Type: Enterprise-class gunboat
- Displacement: 592 long tons (601 t)
- Length: 179 ft 6 in (54.71 m)
- Beam: 30 ft (9.1 m)
- Draft: 11 ft 6 in (3.51 m)
- Speed: 11 knots (20 km/h; 13 mph)
- Armament: 1 × 150-pounder rifle; 1 × 30-pounder rifle; 2 × 9-inch Dahlgren smoothbores; 2 × 24-pounder howitzers; 2 × 12-pounder guns

USS Nipsic was a gunboat in the Union Navy. The ship was laid down on 24 December 1862 by Portsmouth Navy Yard; launched on 15 June 1863; sponsored by Miss Rebecca Scott; and commissioned on 2 September 1863, where Lieutenant Commander George Bacon was in command.

In 1874, she was rebuilt as a new, and substantially larger, Enterprise-class gunboat. The Navy rebuilt some ships to new, when they could not get budget authorization for a new ship, but had significant funding for repairs. She would also be completely rebuilt in 1890, her length and beam extended and her tonnage increased.

== Service history ==
=== 1863–1873 ===
Nipsic arrived off Morris Island, South Carolina, on 5 November 1863 to join in the blockade of Charleston, where she served until the end of the American Civil War. On 27 June 1864, she took schooner Julia as the blockade-runner attempted to enter port.

The Nipsic sank an unknown blockade runner at Murrells Inlet on New Years Day, 1864 during the last known operation during the war.

On 26 June 1865, three sailors deserted from the Nipsic. They were Henry May, Ordinary Seaman; Julius Bergan, Seaman; and John Partington, Seaman. The three had served together on three vessels: Allegheny, Mahaska, Nipsic.

Nipsic served primarily with the South Atlantic Squadron off the coast of Brazil, and in the West Indies, protecting American commerce and interests until 1873 when she was decommissioned and subsequently broken up.

=== 1879–1889 ===
Rebuilt as a new, and substantially larger, Adams/Enterprise-class gunboat, Nipsic recommissioned on 11 October 1879. She served again in the West Indies until March 1880 when she sailed for the European Station.

After three years service in the Mediterranean and along the north and west coasts of Africa, Nipsic returned to the South Atlantic Squadron in June 1883. She served there until March 1886 when she sailed to the Washington Navy Yard for overhaul. In January 1888 she sailed for Cape Horn and Callao, Peru, whence she departed on 23 September for duty as station ship in Apia Harbour, Samoa.

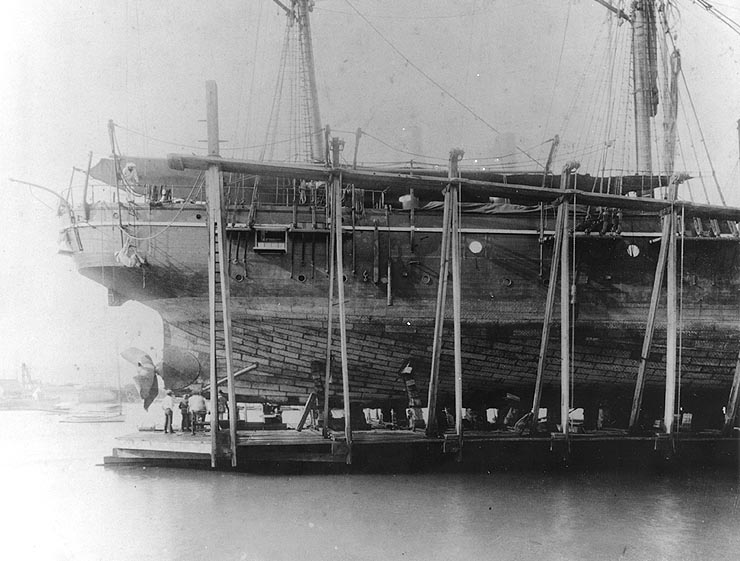
The wreck of USS Nipsic, 1889.

On 15 March 1889, Nipsic rode at anchor in Apia Harbour with USS Vandalia, USS Trenton, HMS Calliope, and three German naval vessels, SMS Adler, SMS Olga, and SMS Eber, along with six merchantmen. Gale-force winds arose, and preparations for leaving harbor were begun, but departure was delayed in the hope that conditions next morning would be more favorable for the sortie. However, by early morning on 16 March the harbor was a mass of foam and spray as hurricane-force winds battered the ships in the 1889 Apia cyclone. Only Calliope, larger and more strongly powered than the others, was able to leave the harbor and became the only vessel present not to be wrecked or sunk. Vandalia, Trenton, Adler and Eber, and the merchantmen were all sunk that day; Nipsic's captain, Cmdr. D. W. Mullin, was able by superb seamanship to beach his ship. While severely damaged by the pounding she received on the beach, Nipsic's hull was intact, although much of her topside structure was battered, all of her propeller blades damaged, two boilers spread and useless, and eight of her crew lost. Refloated and her engines repaired, Nipsic cleared Apia on 9 May for Auckland, but was turned back by heavy seas. On 15 May she again sailed, for Pago Pago, Fanning Island, and Honolulu, arriving on 2 August.

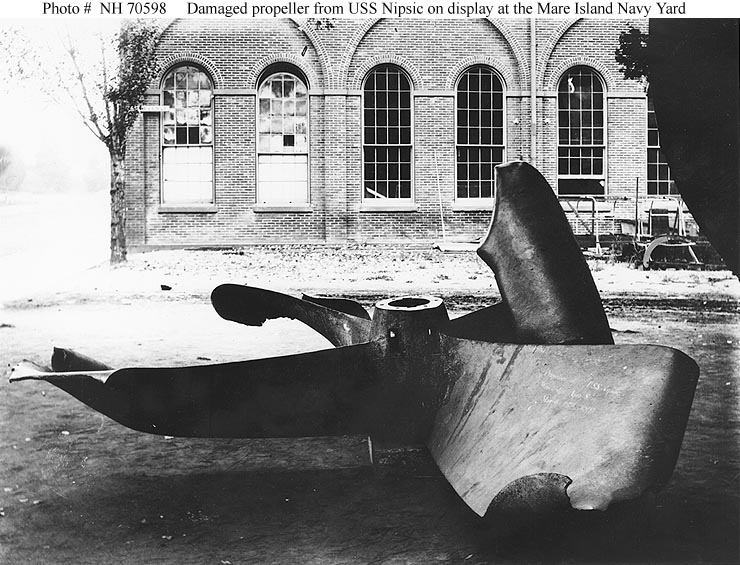
Propeller of USS Nipsic, on display at Mare Island Naval Yard in California.

=== 1890–1913 ===
Nipsic was completely rebuilt in Hawaii, her length and beam extended and her tonnage increased. From 3 January 1890 she cruised in the Hawaiian Islands guarding American interests. She arrived in San Francisco Bay on 30 September, and decommissioned at Mare Island Navy Yard on 2 October 1890. In 1892 she sailed to Puget Sound Navy Yard to serve as receiving ship and prison. On 13 February 1913 she was sold. Nipsic was burned for her estimated salvage value of $15,000 on the shores of Lummi Island, Bellingham Bay, Washington, in late 1915.

IN POPULAR CULTURE

Author Earl Derr Biggers, mentions the USS Nipsic in Chapter 1 of the Charlie Chan mystery novel The Chinese Parrot. In the story, young ensign from the ship introduced the two-step dance into Hawaii.(5)

== See also ==
Media related to USS Nipsic (ship, 1863) at Wikimedia Commons
