= SMS Eber (1887) =

German gunboat of the 1880s

Coordinates: 13°49′53″S 171°45′07″W

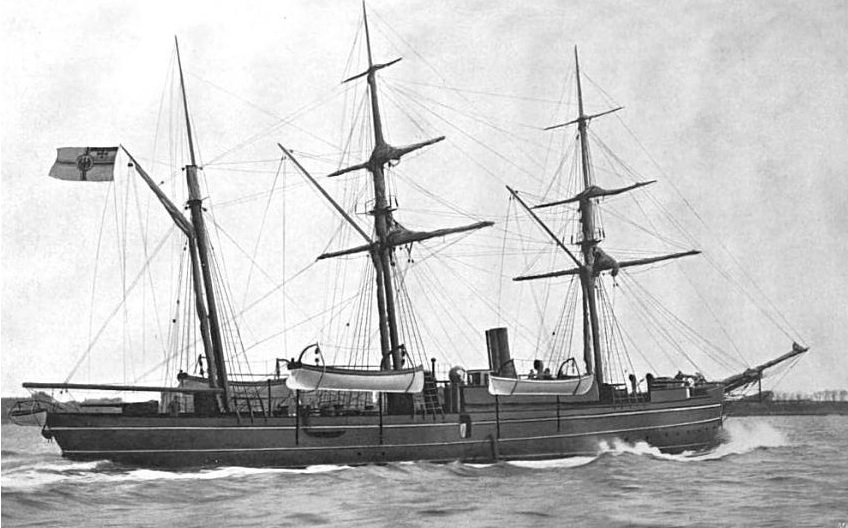
- SMS Eber in 1887

Class overview
- Preceded by: Brummer class
- Succeeded by: SMS Loreley

History
- Name: SMS Eber
- Namesake: German for "boar"
- Operator: Imperial German Navy
- Builder: Kaiserliche Werft Kiel, Germany
- Laid down: 1886
- Launched: 15 February 1887
- Commissioned: 25 September 1887
- Fate: Wrecked, 16 March 1889

General characteristics
- Type: Steam gunboat
- Displacement: Full load: 735 t (723 long tons)
- Length: 51.7 m (169 ft 7 in) (loa)
- Beam: 8 m (26 ft 3 in)
- Draft: 3.8 m (12 ft 6 in) (maximum)
- Installed power: 2 × fire-tube boilers; 760 PS (750 ihp)
- Propulsion: 1 × double-expansion steam engine; 1 × screw propeller
- Speed: 11 knots (20 km/h; 13 mph)
- Range: 2,000 nmi (3,700 km; 2,300 mi) at 9 kn (17 km/h; 10 mph)
- Complement: 5 officers; 76 enlisted men
- Armament: 3 × 10.5 cm (4.1 in) guns; 4 × 37 mm (1.5 in) Hotchkiss revolver cannon

SMS Eber was a steam gunboat built for the German Kaiserliche Marine (Imperial Navy) in the 1880s, the only ship of her class. Intended to serve abroad, the ship was ordered as part of a construction program intended to modernize Germany's fleet of cruising vessels in the early-1880s. She was armed with a main battery of three 10.5 cm (4.1 in) guns and had a top speed of 11 knots (20 km/h; 13 mph).

Immediately after commissioning in September 1887, Eber was deployed to the South Pacific to patrol the German colonial empire. Soon after arriving, her initial captain was relieved of command due to a nervous breakdown. In October 1888, she sailed to Nauru, where her crew formally proclaimed the German annexation of the island and disarmed its inhabitants, ending the Nauruan Civil War. She was thereafter stationed in Apia, Samoa, during the Samoan crisis that involved Germany, the United States, and United Kingdom.

The ship sent a landing party ashore in December 1888 that saw action during the First Battle of Vailele, a major defeat for German forces. She was present in the harbor on 16 March 1889 when a hurricane struck the island; all of the German and American ships were either destroyed or grounded by the storm. Eber was thrown into the reef by strong waves and smashed to pieces; out of her crew, only five survived the sinking. Another five men were ashore at the time and also survived the incident. The devastation nevertheless led to a settlement of the crisis and eventual partition of the islands into German and American colonies.

== Design ==
As Germany embarked on creating its colonial empire in the mid-1880s, the need for additional small, long-range cruising vessels became increasingly apparent. In addition, the German cruiser fleet consisted of a mix of old, worn-out vessels that needed to be replaced. General Leo von Caprivi, who had become the head of the Kaiserliche Admiralität (Imperial Admiralty) in 1883, embarked on a construction program to modernize the fleet.

For the 1885/1886 estimates, the navy requested a new vessel to replace the steam gunboat Albatross, which had been launched in 1871. The size of the new ship, ordered as "Ersatz Albatross", (Note: German warships were ordered under provisional names. Additions to the fleet were given a single letter; ships intended to replace older or lost vessels were ordered as "Ersatz (name of the ship to be replaced)".) was reduced compared to the preceding Habicht-class gunboats to reduce the confusion of classifications that had existed along the lower end of German warships. (Note: Earlier classes had alternated between designations as "gunboats", "avisos", and "cruisers" through their careers.) Eber introduced a uniform appearance for German warships of the period, featuring a ram bow that bore little utility but ensured the ship would resemble the other vessels being built for the colonial fleet.

=== Characteristics ===
Eber was 48.5 meters (159 ft 1 in) long at the waterline and 51.7 m (169 ft 7 in) long overall, with a beam of 8 m (26 ft 3 in). She had a draft of 3.1 m (10 ft 2 in) forward and 3.8 m (12 ft 6 in) aft. She displaced 582 metric tons (573 long tons) as designed and 735 t (723 long tons) at full load. Her hull was constructed with transverse iron frames, and it was divided into five watertight compartments. Steering was controlled via a single rudder. The ship handled and maneuvered well, but pitched and rolled severely. She handled well under sail, but had difficulty making forward progress in a head sea. The ship's crew consisted of 5 officers and 76 enlisted men. Eber carried a number of small boats, including one pinnace, two cutters, one yawl, and one dinghy.

She was powered by a 3-cylinder double-expansion steam engine that drove a 2-bladed screw propeller, while could be retracted while the ship was under sail. Steam provided by two coal-fired, cylindrical fire-tube boilers, which were vented through a single funnel located amidships. Her propulsion system produced a top speed of 11 knots (20 km/h; 13 mph) at 760 metric horsepower (750 ihp). Eber carried 78 t (77 long tons) of coal for her boilers. At a cruising speed of 9 knots (17 km/h; 10 mph), she could steam for 2,000 nautical miles (3,700 km; 2,300 mi). To supplement the steam engine on long voyages, the ship was fitted with a three-masted barque sailing rig with a surface area of 590 m^{2} (6,400 sq ft).

The ship was armed with a main battery of three 10.5 cm (4.1 in) K L/35 built-up guns in individual pivot mounts. Two were placed side-by-side toward the bow in sponsons and the third was placed on the centerline aft. The guns had a maximum range of 8,000 m (8,700 yd) and were supplied with a total of 390 shells. She also carried four 37 mm (1.5 in) Hotchkiss revolver cannon.

== Service history ==
The keel for Eber was laid down in 1886 at the Kaiserliche Werft (Imperial Shipyard) in Kiel. She was launched of 15 February 1887 and Vizeadmiral (Vice Admiral) Wilhelm von Wickede, the commander of the Marinestation der Ostsee (Baltic Sea Naval Station), christened the vessel. Work on the ship was completed later that year, and on 25 September, Eber was commissioned to begin sea trials. The ship performed so well in her trials that they were concluded in early November. The ship sailed from Kiel on 10 November, bound for a tour in the South Pacific to relieve the gunboat Albatross and permit the screw corvette Olga to re-join the Cruiser Squadron elsewhere.

=== Deployment to the South Pacific ===
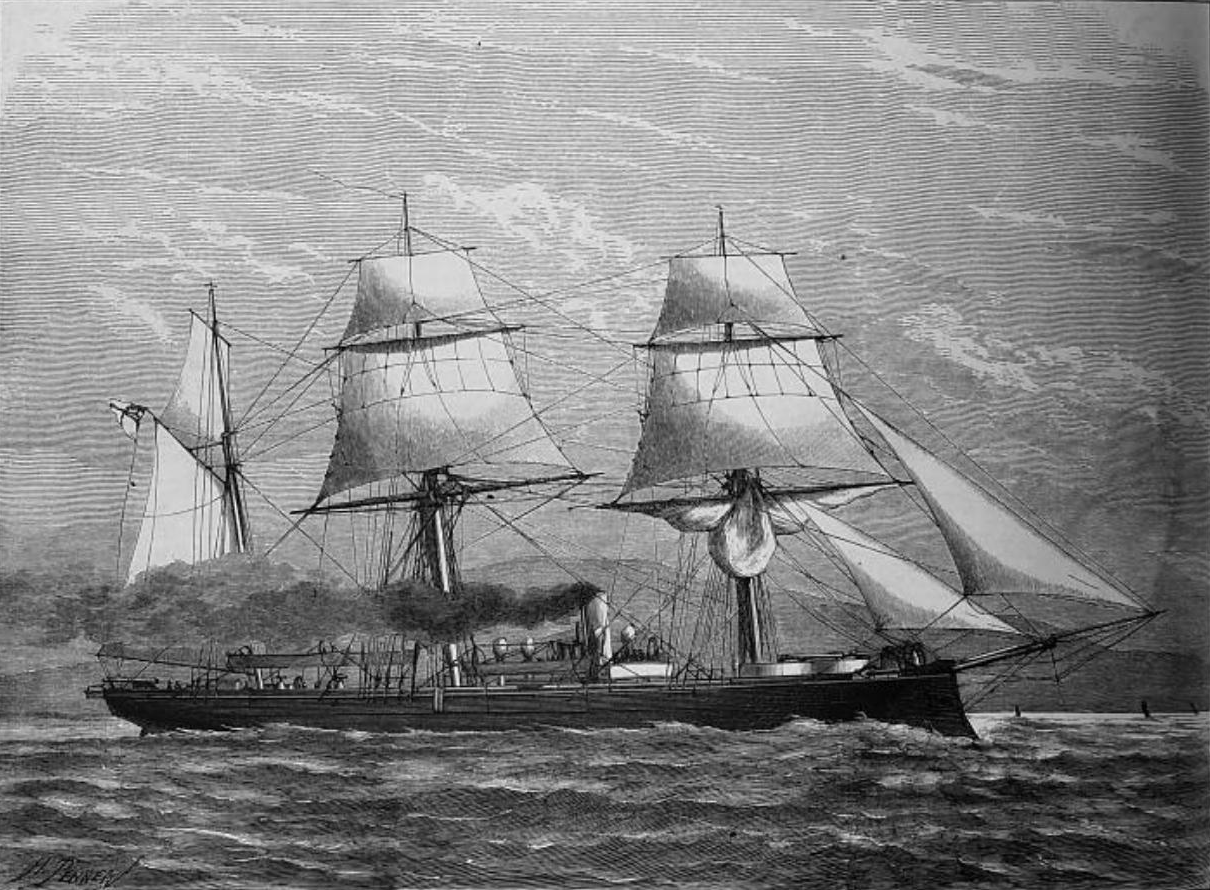
Sketch of Eber in 1887

After 131 days, of which 49 were spent in various ports along the way, Eber reached Cooktown, Australia; over the course of the voyage, the crew dealt with a number of accidents, including a fire in her coal bunkers. She then sailed north to Matupi Harbor in German New Guinea before proceeding on to Apia, Samoa, which was where the ship would be stationed in the midst of the Samoan crisis. She arrived there on 24 April 1888, joining the gunboat Adler. Eber's commander, Kapitänleutnant (Captain Lieutenant) Bethge, had begun to exhibit severe nervousness during the voyage from Germany, which worsened after arriving in Samoa. The ship's executive officer, Leutnant zur See (LzS—Lieutenant at Sea) Hugo Emsmann reported the situation to the captain of Adler. The latter evaluated Bethge's condition, and deemed him unfit to continue command; he ordered Bethge to return home and turn over command of the ship to Emsmann. This was one of very few instances of a ship captain being relieved of command in the history of the imperial navy. The Kaiserliche Admiralität approved the measures on 7 August and ordered Bethge to return home aboard a merchant vessel; he was thereafter discharged from the navy.

In late July, Eber embarked on a cruise through German New Guinea that lasted through the end of November. During the voyage, she had the local Reichskommissar, Biermann, aboard, and the ship's crew made several landings to punish locals who had attacked Germans throughout the islands. In his report of the cruise, Emsmann stated that US missionaries agitated against Germans and provided firearms to rebels against German rule. On 1 October, Eber stopped in Nauru, which Germany had annexed in October 1887. Aboard was the new Reichskommissar, Franz Sonnenschein, who was to formally take control of the island. The Nauruans were heavily armed, having been supplied with arms for decades by passing merchant ships in exchange for copra. Eber's landing party of thirty-six went ashore and took several local leaders prisoner. The next morning, the Germans read a proclamation of Germany's annexation and announced that if all weapons on the island were not surrendered, the leaders would be executed. By 3 October, the Germans had received 110 handguns and 655 rifles, so they released the leaders and Eber departed. In addition to securing the island under German control, this action ended the Nauruan Civil War.

Eber arrived back in Apia on 22 November, where her new captain, KL Eugen Wallis was waiting to take command of the vessel. Emsmann left the ship and transferred to Olga. By this time, fighting had flared up again on Samoa between rival factions: a pro-German group led by Tupua Tamasese and a group led by Mataʻafa Iosefo who favored the United States. Repeated attacks of Germans in December led the commander of Adler to send a landing party ashore to defend the plantation at Vailele. A force of Samoans led by an American ambushed the Germans in the First Battle of Vailele, prompting Wallis to deploy his own landing corps to support Adler's men. Sixteen men from the ships' crews were killed in the action, which was the heaviest defeat of the German Navy until the outbreak of World War I. In the aftermath of the battle, the pro-American faction became increasingly aggressive, burning the German consulate and engaging in British forces on the island, which suffered significant losses.

==== Loss ====
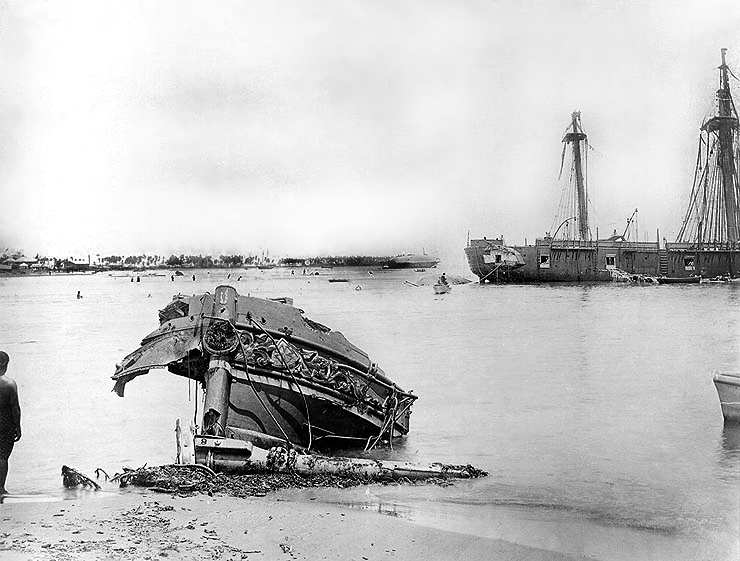
Fragment of Eber's bow on the beach of Apia after the cyclone

Tensions between the Germans and their American counterparts culminated in early 1889 when both squadrons were destroyed by the 1889 Apia cyclone. Though the Germans recognized the approach of the storm on 15 March, they feared that moving their ships out of the path of the storm would allow either the Samoans to resume attacks on Germans on the island, or permit the Americans to take advantage of their absence. As the storm struck the island on the night of 16–17 March, Eber's crew ran the engine at full power, while moored with three anchors, in an attempt to prevent the ship from being blown ashore by the powerful wind and waves. Eventually, her rudder snapped and the anchor chains broke, and a large wave pushed her over the reef outside the harbor. Repeated waves smashed the ship to pieces, killing seventy-three of her crew. Five men survived the sinking, one of whom was LzS Friedrich Gädeke, and another five had been ashore at the time, guarding the consulate.

Only fragments of the shattered wreck of Eber were found the next morning. Adler was also destroyed in the storm, being thrown up onto the reef as well, though most of her crew survived. The men from Eber and some of those from Adler were embarked aboard the steamer SS Lübeck for the voyage home, transferring to the transport ship SS Habsburg during the journey.

Most of the other ships in the harbor were similarly destroyed; only the British corvette HMS Calliope survived, as her captain had departed to avoid the storm. The American vessels in the harbor—USS Nipsic, the sloop USS Vandalia, and the screw frigate USS Trenton—were wrecked or beached, and Olga was also driven ashore. The incident defused the tensions between the Germans and Americans, however, as the survivors had to work together to recover from the disaster. Later that year, representatives from the United States and Britain met in Berlin to discuss a solution to the crisis, resulting in a shared supervisory arrangement between the three countries in the Treaty of Berlin, though this would not prove satisfactory in the long run, and following the start of the Second Samoan Civil War, the islands were formally partitioned into American and German colonies in the Tripartite Convention of 1899.
