= 1889 Apia cyclone =

Category 1 South Pacific cyclone in 1889

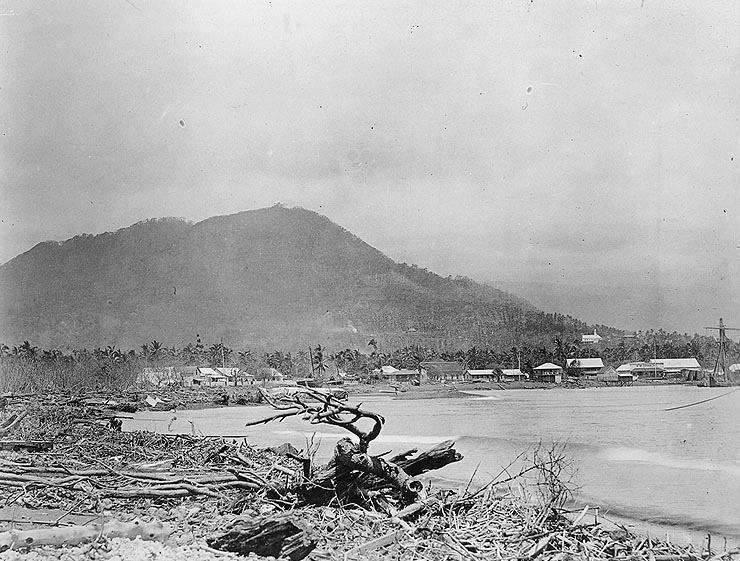
- Damage in Apia, Samoa after the cyclone hit.

Meteorological history
- Formed: before 13 March 1889
- Dissipated: after 17 March 1889

Category 1-equivalent tropical cyclone
- 1-minute sustained (SSHWS/JTWC)
- Highest winds: 120 km/h (75 mph)

Overall effects
- Fatalities: ≤ 147 total
- Part of the Pre-1900 South Pacific cyclone seasons

The 1889 Apia cyclone was a tropical cyclone in the South Pacific Ocean, which swept across Apia, Samoa on 15 March 1889, during the Samoan crisis. The effect on shipping in the harbour was devastating, largely because of what has been described as "an error of judgement that will forever remain a paradox in human psychology".

== Background ==
Events ashore had led to upheaval in the Pacific nations and colonies. Both the United States and Imperial Germany saw this as a potential opportunity to expand their holdings in the Pacific through gunboat diplomacy. In order to be ready should such an opportunity arise, both nations had dispatched squadrons to the town to investigate the situation and act accordingly. A British ship was also present, ostensibly to observe the actions of the other nations during the Samoan upheavals.

Apia is an exposed harbour, unprotected by high ground or an enclosing reef. The northern part of the harbour is open to the Pacific. It is possible for the winds and the waves to sweep through the area, and to drive onto the reefs at the Southern end, or to toss up the beach any shipping which remained in the bay. No officers made a move, even though each officer of the various navies was well aware of the necessary procedures in the face of such a threat. This has been attributed to jingoism or national pride. No man in the harbour was willing to admit in front of the navies of other nations that he was afraid of the elements. Everyone refused to take precautions. The merchant ships that accompanied them were not allowed to move either. Thirteen ships, and some larger vessels, were left at anchor close to one another in the Apia harbour.

== The cyclone ==
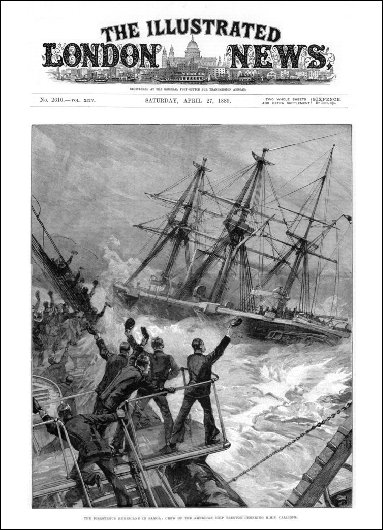
Illustrated London News for 27 April 1889; artist's conception of HMS Calliope being cheered on by the crew of USS Trenton as Calliope escapes from Apia Harbour (Calliope actually passed to Trenton's port).

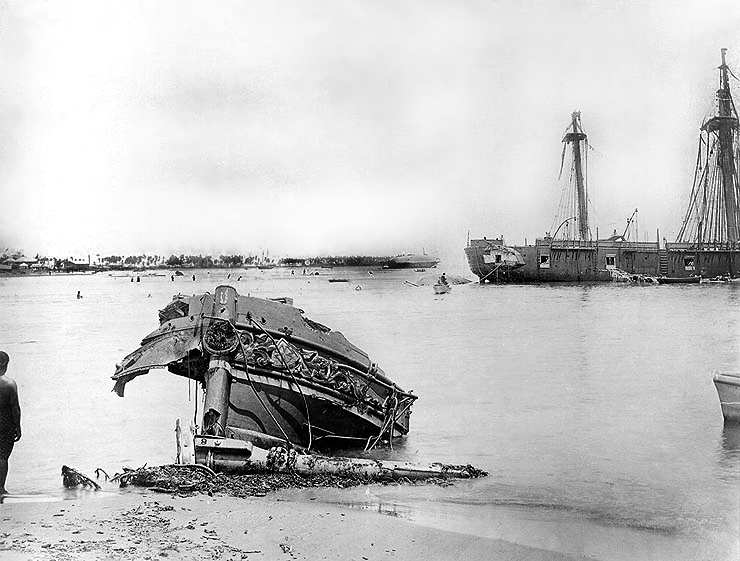
Wrecked ships in Apia Harbor, Upolu, Samoa soon after the storm. The view looks northwestward, with the shattered bow of the German gunboat Eber on the beach in the foreground. The stern of USS Trenton is at right, with the sunken USS Vandalia alongside. The German gunboat SMS Adler is on her side in the center distance. Trenton's starboard quarter gallery has been largely ripped away.

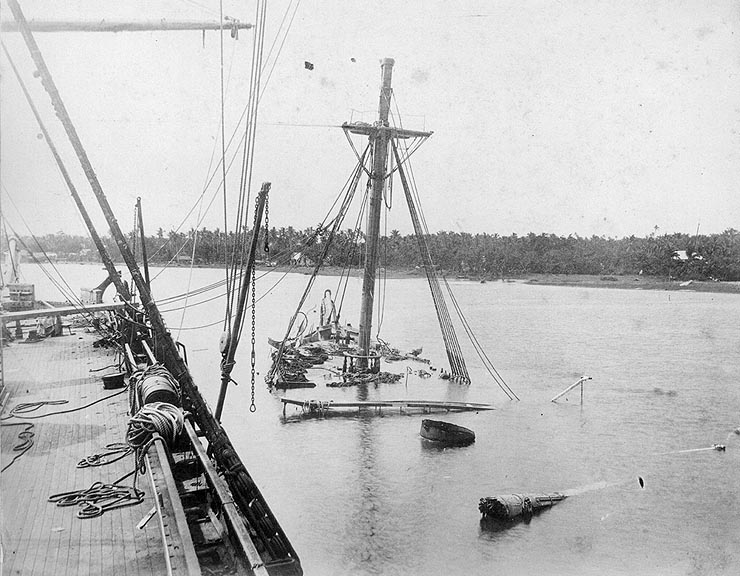
A view of the sunken USS Vandalia from the deck of USS Trenton, March 1889.

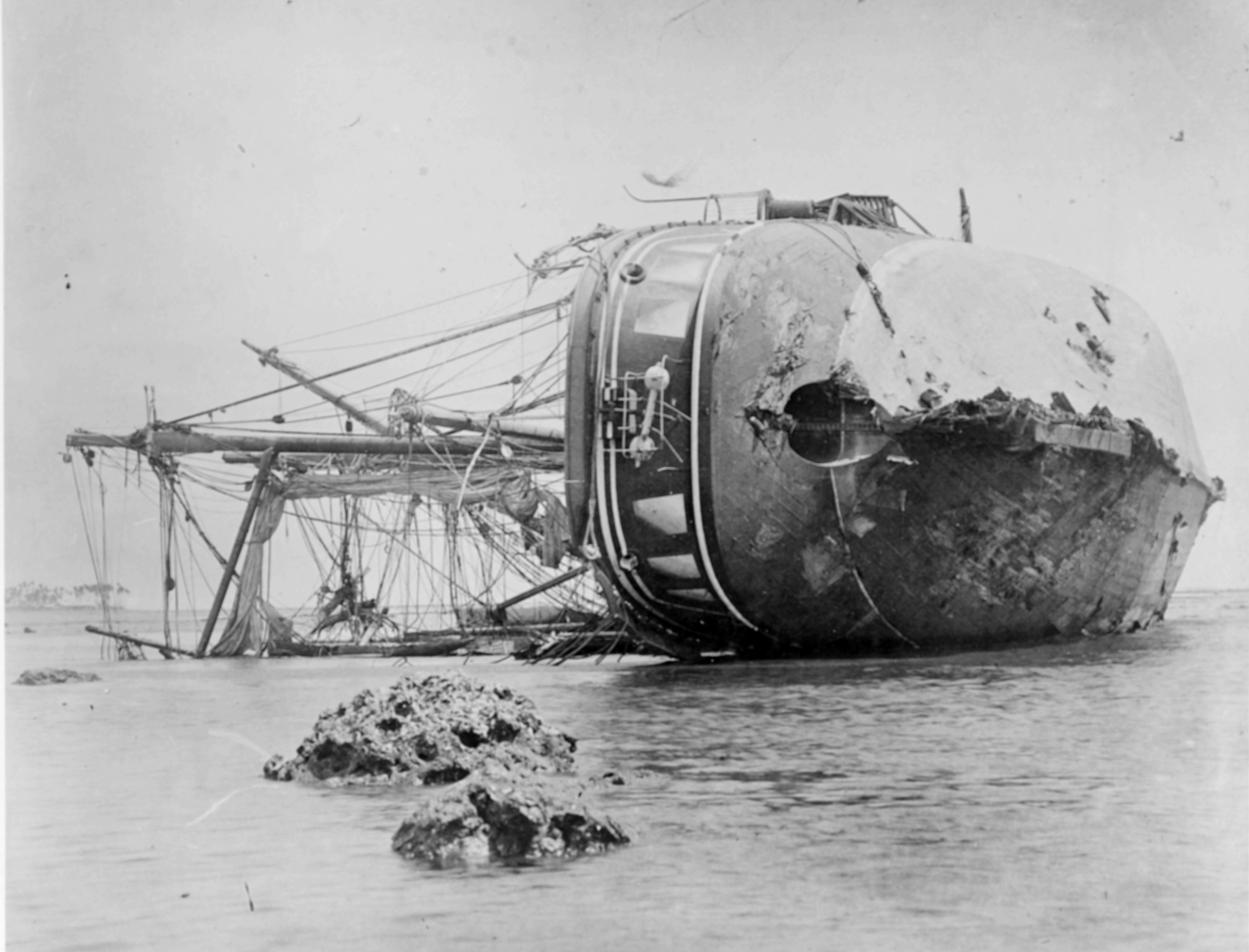
German gunboat Adler. Overturned on the reef, on the western side of Apia Harbor, Upolu, Samoa, soon after the storm. Note her battered hull, the well for her hoisting propeller, a rescue buoy mounted on her stern, and decorative windows painted on her quarters.

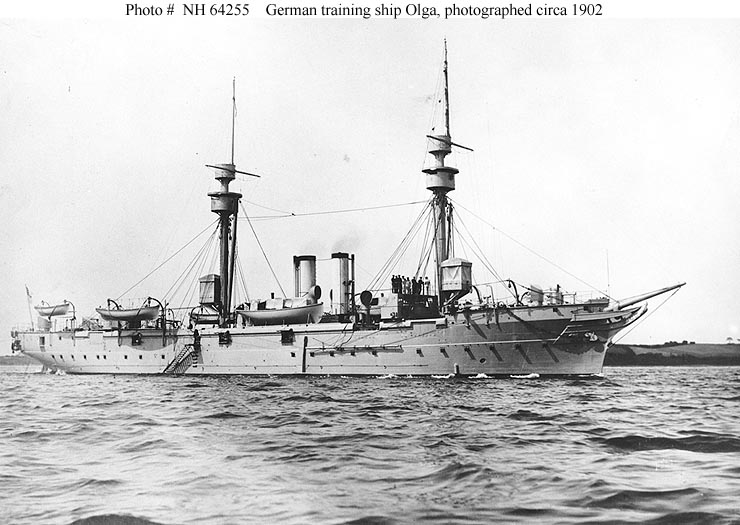
Training ship SMS Olga, photo taken 1902

Increasing signs of the impending disaster were visible during the days that preceded the cyclone of 15 March. March was the cyclone season in this area. Just three years earlier, Apia had been hit by a cyclone about which the local people told the captains of the anchored ships. The weather was beginning to change, and the atmospheric pressure was beginning to fall. The captains were experienced Pacific seamen, as were many members of their crews. Everyone saw the approaching signs of impending disaster. Everyone knew that the only chance of riding out the 160 km/h (100 mph) winds was to take to the open sea.

The result was catastrophic when the cyclone made its landfall. The local people had taken themselves to safety well before the storm struck. The ships that were in the bay only began to evacuate at the very last minute. All the ships were crowded toward the entrance to the bay when the cyclone hit. Only HMS Calliope escaped, making less than one knot (1.9 km/h; 1.2 mph) against the oncoming wind and sea. She dragged herself to the open sea, despite being less than one point eight metres (6 ft) from a reef at one point. She was able to ride out the ensuing winds easily once she was out to sea. Her survival is attributed to her size (2,227 tons), and her more powerful and modern engines, built only five years earlier, as compared to the ten or twenty years for many of the other ships.

Chaos reigned in the harbour for the other ships. USS Trenton was tossed against the beach in the afternoon, dragged back into the sea and wrecked on a reef at 10 p.m. that evening, although the majority of her crew survived unhurt and were able to participate in the ensuing rescue operation. USS Vandalia was smashed into the same reef in the early afternoon, and her surviving crew spent a miserable day and night clinging to her rigging before being rescued, by which time 43 of her complement had drowned. USS Nipsic was thrown high on the beach with eight of her crew missing or dead and her internal systems totally wrecked. She would however later be refloated and eventually reconstructed in Hawaii.

The German ships fared much worse: SMS Olga came off best, thrown high onto the beach where she was wrecked but many of her crew survived, escaping onto higher ground. SMS Adler and SMS Eber were less fortunate, because they were caught at the harbour mouth by the initial blow and were bodily picked up and smashed together. Eber sank in deep water, while Adler came to rest on her side, on the reef. In total, 96 men from their crews drowned in the storm, and both ships were totally destroyed. All six of the merchant ships remaining in the harbour were wrecked, and the death toll was well over 200 sailors from several nationalities.

The incident is often cited as a clear example of the dangers of putting national pride before necessity, especially in the face of natural disaster. The incident did not blunt the Pacific ambitions of any of the imperial powers involved in the disaster. However, the Germans and British continued to make territorial gains amongst the Samoan islands and New Guinea, whilst the United States focused on the Philippines and Micronesia, although more care was taken to respect the weather phenomena of the Pacific from this point on.

== Ships ==
| USS Trenton | United States | Wrecked, 1 dead |
| USS Nipsic | United States | Beached and repaired, 8 dead |
| USS Vandalia | United States | Wrecked, 43 dead |
| HMS Calliope | British | Survived the storm |
| SMS Olga | German | Beached and repaired |
| SMS Eber | German | Wrecked and sunk, 73 dead |
| SMS Adler | German | Wrecked and sunk, 20 dead |

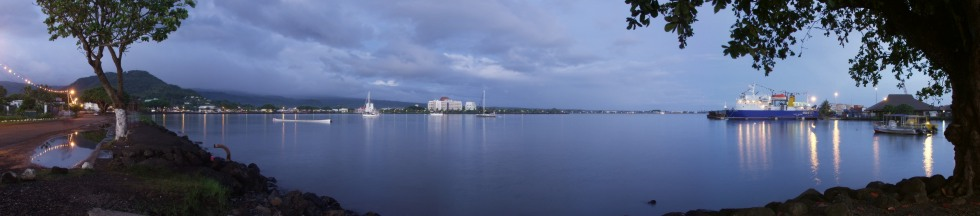
Port of Apia in 2003

== Notes ==
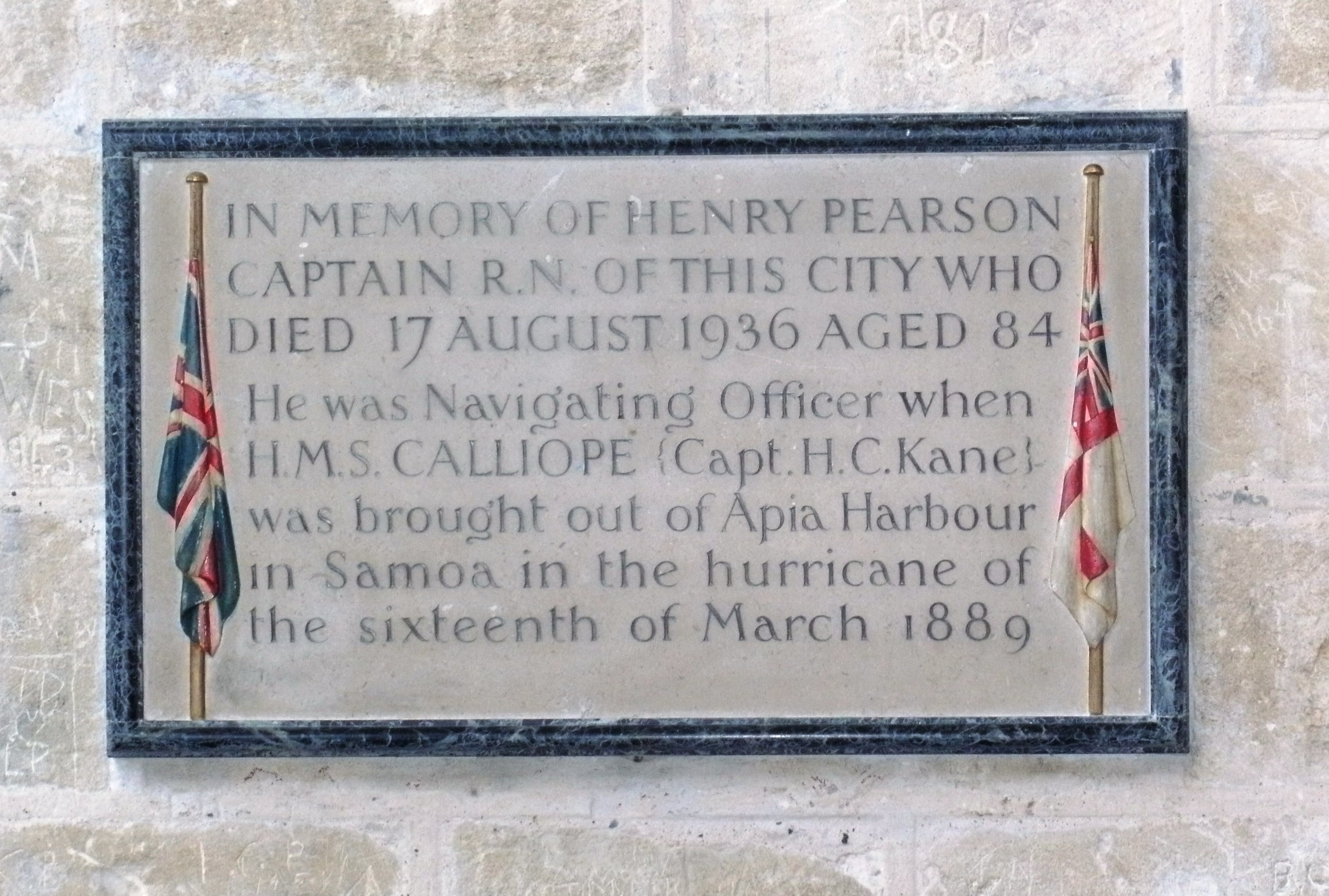
Memorial tablet to Henry Pearson (died 1936) in Winchester Cathedral, with a reference to HMS Calliope and the cyclone

Some unreferenced and early sources claim that the Olga was a Russian ship, and that the Nipsic was Japanese. This is not true and is probably caused by those names sounding "ethnic" to an uninformed observer.

Robert Louis Stevenson wrote an account of this disaster, differing from this article in A footnote to history.
