= SMS Habicht (1879) =

German gunboat of the 1870s

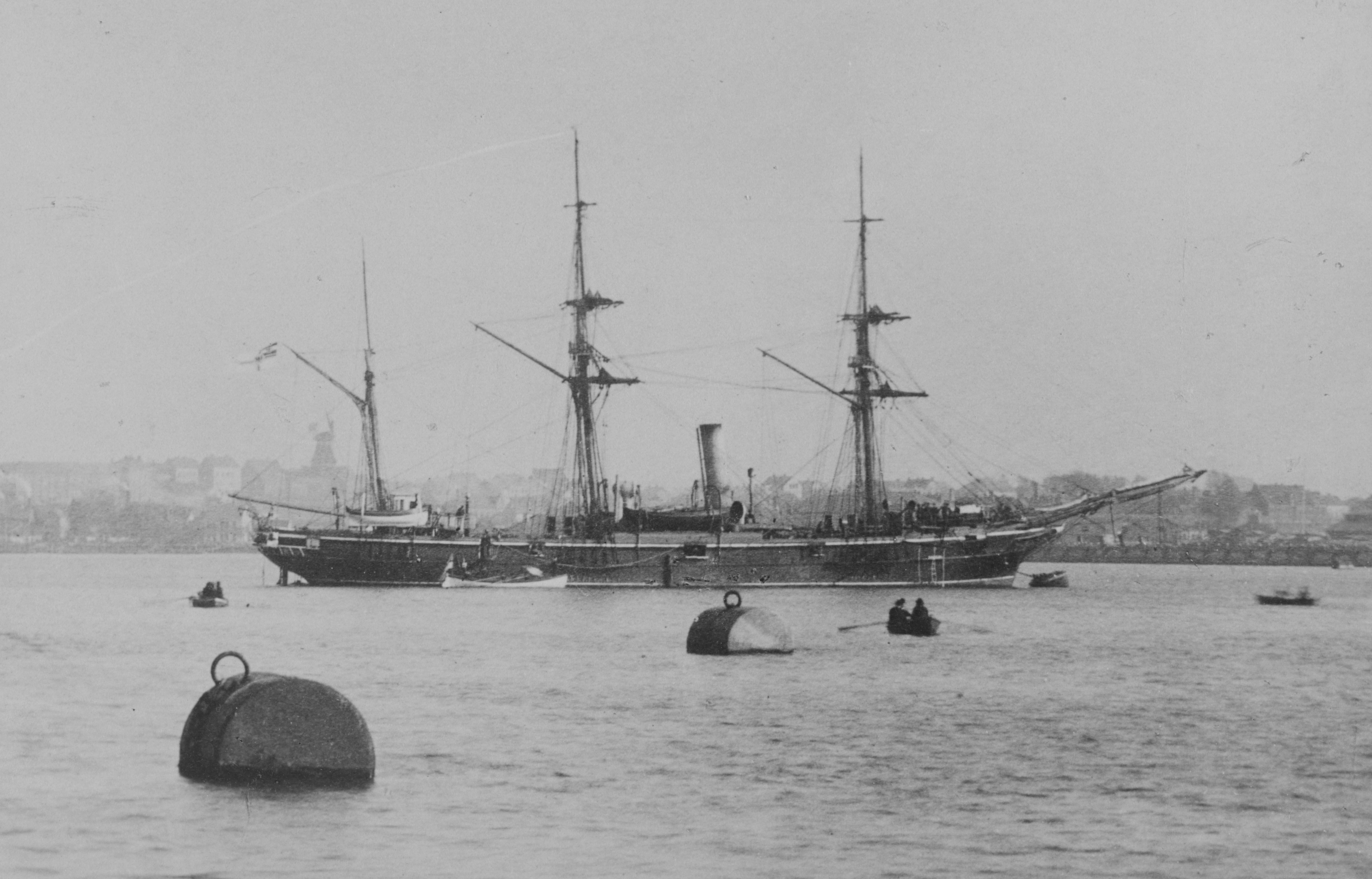
- Habicht probably in the 1880s

History
- Name: Habicht
- Operator: Imperial German Navy
- Builder: Schichau-Werke, Elbing
- Laid down: 1878
- Launched: 13 May 1879
- Commissioned: 18 March 1880
- Decommissioned: 2 October 1905
- Stricken: 24 March 1906
- Fate: Broken up

General characteristics
- Class & type: Habicht-class gunboat
- Displacement: Design: 840 t (830 long tons); Full load: 1,005 t (989 long tons)
- Length: 59.2 m (194 ft 3 in)
- Beam: 8.9 m (29 ft 2 in)
- Draft: 3.52 m (11 ft 7 in)
- Installed power: 2 × fire-tube boilers; 600 PS (590 ihp)
- Propulsion: 1 × double-expansion steam engine; 1 × screw propeller
- Speed: 11 knots (20 km/h; 13 mph)
- Range: 2,010 nmi (3,720 km; 2,310 mi) at 9 kn (17 km/h; 10 mph)
- Complement: 6–7 officers; 121–126 enlisted men
- Armament: 1 × 15 cm (5.9 in) gun; 4 × 12 cm (4.7 in) guns

SMS Habicht was the lead ship of her class of steam gunboats built for the German Kaiserliche Marine (Imperial Navy). The ship was built in the late 1870s and completed in early 1880. Intended to serve abroad, the ship was ordered as part of a construction program intended to modernize Germany's fleet of cruising vessels in the mid-1870s. The Habicht class was armed with a battery of five guns, and was the first class of German gunboat to use compound steam engines. The ship had a top speed of 11 knots (20 km/h; 13 mph).

Habicht spent her whole career on cruises abroad. After entering service in 1880, she was deployed to the South Pacific to protect German economic interests in the region, particularly in Samoa, the Marshall Islands, and the Solomon Islands. During her return to Germany in 1882, she was diverted to Egypt in response to the Anglo-Egyptian War to protect Germans in the country. After an overhaul and period in reserve, Habicht was reactivated in 1885 for another deployment overseas, this time to patrol in the recently acquired colonies in German West Africa. Habicht spent the next seven years conducting mapping work and aiding in the suppression of unrest against German rule. She returned to Germany in 1892.

A third and final overseas voyage began in 1896, which saw the ship return to West African waters. This deployment lasted until 1905, and passed relatively uneventfully, until the outbreak of the Herero Wars in German South West Africa in 1904. Habicht was the first unit to arrive to reinforce the Schutztruppe in the colony, and her captain initially assumed command of the units fighting in the colony. The ship's landing parties saw repeated combat until being relieved as more significant forces arrived in the colony. Habicht was recalled to Germany in 1905, where she was quickly struck from the naval register and sold to ship breakers in 1906.

== Design ==
By the mid-1870s, the large screw frigates and screw corvettes that formed the backbone of the German cruiser force were beginning to need to be replaced. Some of these ships had been in service for twenty years, and in that time spent considerable periods on deployments overseas. To replace these older vessels, the Kaiserliche Marine ordered the six Carola-class corvettes and three Habicht-class steam gunboats. The three gunboats were the first vessels of the type to use compound steam engines, which increased speed and engine efficiency.

Habicht was 59.2 meters (194 ft 3 in) long overall, with a beam of 8.9 m (29 ft 2 in) and a draft of 3.52 m (11 ft 7 in) forward. She displaced 840 metric tons (830 long tons) as designed and 1,005 t (989 long tons) at full load. The ship's crew consisted of 6–7 officers and 121–126 enlisted men. She was powered by a double-expansion steam engine that drove a 2-bladed screw propeller, with steam provided by two coal-fired Scotch marine boilers. Her propulsion system was rated to produce a top speed of 11 knots (20 km/h; 13 mph) at 600 metric horsepower (590 ihp), but she reached 11.4 knots (21.1 km/h; 13.1 mph) in service. At a cruising speed of 9 knots (17 km/h; 10 mph), she could steam for 2,010 nautical miles (3,720 km; 2,310 mi). To supplement the steam engine on long voyages, the ships were fitted with a schooner sailing rig. While cruising under sail, the screw could be raised.

The ship was armed with a single 15 cm (5.9 in) RK L/22 built-up gun, which was supplied from a magazine with 115 shells. She also carried four 12 cm (4.7 in) K L/23 built-up guns, which were supplied with a total of 440 rounds of ammunition. In 1882, the ship's armament was standardized on a uniform battery of five 12.5 cm (4.9 in) K L/23 built-up guns and five 37 mm (1.5 in) Hotchkiss revolver cannon.

== Service history ==
The keel for Habicht was laid down at the Schichau-Werke shipyard in Elbing in 1878 under the provisional name "B". (Note: German warships were ordered under provisional names. Additions to the fleet were given a single letter; ships intended to replace older or lost vessels were ordered as "Ersatz (name of the ship to be replaced)".) Her completed hull was launched on 13 May 1879. Konteradmiral (KAdm—Rear Admiral) Otto Livonius gave a speech at the launching ceremony. The ship was thereafter moved to Schichau-Werke's second yard at Danzig for fitting out work. After work on the ship was completed, she was commissioned on 18 March 1880 to be transferred to Kiel. After arriving, she was decommissioned again on 8 April. Habicht was recommissioned on 29 June to begin sea trials that lasted until 31 July, when she was decommissioned again. These tests were carried out in the Baltic and North Seas, and concluded in Wilhelmshaven.

=== First overseas cruise, 1880–1882 ===
Habicht returned to service on 1 October for the first overseas cruise. She was to sail to Australia and patrol the South Pacific to protect German economic interests in the region. The ship departed Wilhelmshaven on 13 October and passed through Cape Town, South Africa, on 1 January 1881. There, she met her sister ship Möwe, and the two ships continued on together to Australia, sailing from Cape Town on 10 January. They anchored in Melbourne, Australia, on 27 February. They met the screw frigate Hertha, and the three ships represented Germany at the Melbourne International Exhibition, which was taking place at the time. Habicht left Melbourne on 27 March, bound for Apia in Samoa, which she reached on 19 April. The other two ships and the gunboat Hyäne joined her there soon thereafter. On 11 May, Habicht sailed from Apia with the German general consul, Otto Zembsch, on board for a tour of the region, including a voyage through the Marshall Islands that lasted from 29 May to 24 June. While in the Marshalls, the ship made maps of Majuro. She then sailed south to Matupi Harbor on the island of New Georgia, arriving there on 15 July. At that time, German trading companies were frequent targets of attacks by local residents, and Habicht spent the next month and a half conducting reprisals, particularly on the islands of Nusa and Utuan, the latter having been the site of the murders of four Germans. The ship sent her landing party ashore to capture the murderers. During this period, the ship also conducted surveys while cruising along the coast.

In late August, Habicht left the area to visit the Caroline Islands, where she surveyed the harbors on Yap. She thereafter sailed to the Marshalls, where she surveyed Jaluit. On 12 October, the ship arrived back in Apia and relieved Möwe as the station vessel. Later that year, Habicht received orders to return to Germany. She sailed from Apia on 1 December and stopped initially in Auckland, New Zealand, for repairs that lasted from 22 December to 26 February 1882. She then resumed her voyage home, and passed through the Suez Canal in March before stopping in Malta on 1 April. While there, she received orders to sail back to Egypt to protect German and Austro-Hungarian citizens and economic interests in the country during the Urabi revolt. There, she was joined by Möwe, which was also returning home, and the screw corvette Gneisenau. On 10 July, the day before the British bombardment of Alexandria, Habicht embarked Germans in the city and took them to the outer roadstead during the attack. Alexandria then devolved into chaos as the government collapsed, so the British and neutral warships in the harbor, including Habicht, sent landing parties into the city to restore order. The aviso Zieten arrived on 29 September to replace Habicht, allowing her to resume her voyage home. The ship reached Wilhelmshaven on 27 October, and she was decommissioned there on 6 November for a refit and modernization that lasted until mid-1884. Work included replacing her armament and modifying her sailing rig. She briefly conducted sea trials from 5 August to 6 September before being placed in reserve.

=== Second overseas cruise, 1885–1892 ===
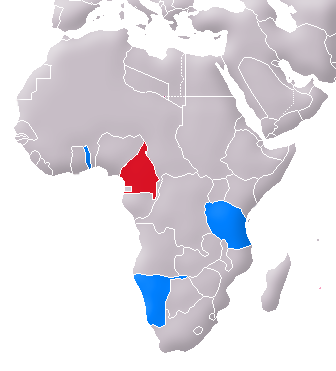
Map showing Germany's colonies in Africa; Kamerun is depicted in red, with Togoland to the west and German South West Africa to the south; German East Africa is to the east

In 1884, Germany acquired the colony of Kamerun in Central Africa, which required warships to be permanently stationed there to maintain German control. Habicht was recommissioned for this purpose on 19 January 1885, under the command of Korvettenkapitän (KK—Corvette Captain) Hugo von Schuckmann. She sailed from Wilhelmshaven on 27 January and stopped in São Vicente, Cape Verde, on 1 March, where she met the screw corvette Ariadne, which was returning to Germany. Ariadne transferred her extra rifle ammunition and tropical equipment to Habicht, as she no longer needed it. The latter vessel then departed and arrived in Kamerun on 23 March, where she joined the West African Squadron, led by the corvette Bismarck. By 9 November, the new commander of the squadron, KAdm Carl Heinrich Theodor Paschen, arrived aboard his flagship, the corvette Prinz Adalbert. Paschen transferred to Habicht to enter the shallow waters at Douala to visit the colonial governor there. From 16 to 26 November, Habicht toured ports in southern Kamerun, before sailing north and west to visit the German colony of Togoland, along with ports between there and Kamerun from 29 November to 20 December.

Prior to Habicht's second cruise, the German navy had historically recalled ships after two years in tropical conditions, owing to the difficulty for the crews in the unfamiliar climate. Beginning in 1886, they began the practice of sending replacement crews to the ships while on station. Additionally, the ships would be repaired in foreign shipyards as practicable. For Habicht, this meant travel to Cape Town for an annual overhaul; the first of these began on 23 March. Work was completed by 6 April, when she departed to return to Kamerun, arriving on 10 May. On 5 July, she and the gunboat Cyclop were present in Douala for the cornerstone ceremony for the new government building being built there. The government steamship SS Nachtigal arrived on 5 August, and the ships thereafter began extensive surveys and cartographic work in the colony. Habicht departed for a cruise to visit the British colony at Ascension Island in October to give the crew a break from the tropical climate. In November, KK Walther Koch replaced Schuckmann as the ship's captain.

In February 1887, Habicht sailed south for another overhaul in Cape Town that lasted until May. After arriving back in Kamerun, she sent a landing party of 63 men ashore in response to repeated attacks by tribes living inland against trade caravans. The Germans traveled inland on several small boats via the Wouri River, before attacking and subduing the residents of three villages in the area. In 1887, thirty-six men of the crew contracted malaria, of whom two died. Habicht cruised in cooler areas along the coast from September to early November to help the crewmen recover. KK Oscar von Schuckmann arrived in November to relieve Koch. On 8 January 1888, Habicht sent a contingent of men ashore to serve as the honor guard at the funeral for the German explorer Gustav Nachtigal in Douala. In February, she departed for her annual overhaul at Cape Town, but was diverted to German South West Africa to suppress unrest against German rule in the Walvis Bay area. The situation had calmed by the time she arrived, allowing Habicht to continue on south. Work in Cape Town lasted until mid-June, when she returned to Kamerun. From 23 August to 20 October, Habicht cruised south in the cooler bay near Benguela, Portuguese Angola, to rest the crew. On 28 October, a replacement crew for the ship arrived aboard a passenger ship operated by the Woermann-Linie shipping company. The following month, KK Rudolf Rittmeyer replaced Schuckmann. On 24 December, Hyäne arrived to replace Cyclop as the second gunboat on the West Africa station.

The year 1889 passed largely the same as previous years, though the overhaul in Cape Town lasted longer than typical. Habicht also carried out survey work in the Rio del Rey estuary. KK Burich took command of the ship in October. The year 1890 passed largely uneventfully, except that Burich became very ill with malaria and had to leave the ship and turn over command to KK Erich von Dresky in October. Burich died aboard a passenger ship on his way back to Germany. In early July 1891, Habicht sent a landing party to respond to raids by the Bakoko on farms in the area around Grand Batanga. Later that month, another detachment was sent aboard the small steamer SS Soden up the Wouri in response to reports of unrest upriver, but their presence proved to be unnecessary. Habicht made another cruise in cooler waters in September and October, and thereafter sent a contingent of officers and sailors ashore to help train local police forces who had been recruited from Dahomey. On 18–19 October, Habicht's men, the police force, and elements of the colonial Schutztruppe (Protection Force) went to Douala to suppress unrest in the city. In mid-January 1892, Habicht sailed south for the routine overhaul in Cape Town, which lasted until mid-April. From late April to June, she toured ports in Nigeria and along the Gold Coast. Since she had been abroad for eight years by this point, Habicht was ordered home; she left Kamerun in early September and arrived in Kiel on 20 November. She was decommissioned on 6 December for the overhaul, which included replacing her boilers.

=== Third overseas cruise, 1896–1905 ===
Habicht remained out of service for the next four years until late 1896, when she was recommissioned to replace the unprotected cruiser Sperber in Kamerun. She departed Germany on 12 October and arrived in the colony on 16 December. For the rest of the year, and through most of 1897, Habicht toured ports in the region, but otherwise the time passed uneventfully. During this period, Hyäne was the other station ship in the area. In October, Habicht sent a landing party to reinforce the Schutztruppe at Kribi during a period of unrest. The gunboat Wolf arrived in December to replace Hyäne. In January 1898, Habicht sailed south to Cape Town for an overhaul. The rest of the year passed quietly for the ship, as did the first half of 1899. In October that year, the Second Boer War broke out between South Africa and the Boer republics. In response, Habicht and Wolf were sent to the coast of German South West Africa to be ready in the event of an emergency. In November, KK William Kutter arrived to take command of the ship.

Habicht sailed to Cape Town for repair work in early January 1900, but her stay in the port lasted only until 22 March, owing to the rising tensions between Germany and Britain over the British seizure of German merchant vessels passing through the British blockade of the Boers. In early September, Habicht's crew found leaks in her hull, though they were not so significant that they could not be repaired in Kamerun. They removed equipment from the ship to lighten her, and then towed her onto a small slipway, where the hull was re-sealed. Refloating the ship proved to be the most time-consuming part of the work, and it took six weeks to accomplish. In January 1901, the ship sailed to Sao Paulo de Luanda, Portuguese Angola, for her annual overhaul instead of Cape Town. The next three years passed relatively quietly for the ship, and her crew was primarily occupied with visiting numerous ports in the region. During this period, KK Konrad Trummler commanded the ship from November 1901 to October 1902, followed temporarily by Kapitänleutnant (Captain Lieutenant) Max Schlicht, who captained the ship until KK Berthold Stechow arrived later that month. In November 1903, KK Gudewill replaced Stechow.

==== Herero Wars ====
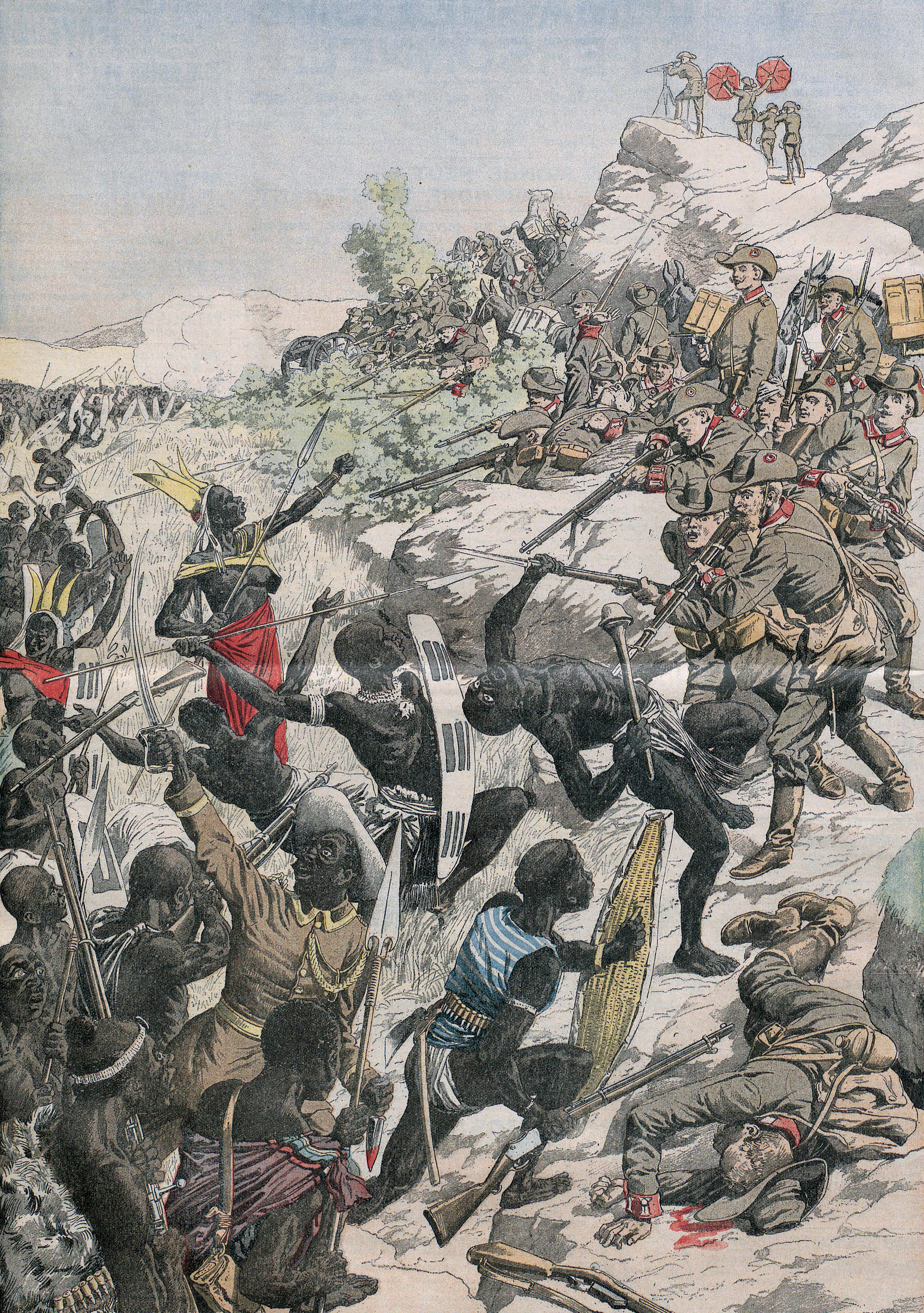
Depiction of German and Herero forces fighting in 1904

Habicht arrived in Cape Town on 10 January 1904 for her annual overhaul, but two days later, before work began, she received news of a major uprising in German South West Africa. On 14 January, the Imperial Admiralty Staff ordered Habicht to sail to Swakopmund, German South West Africa. She arrived there four days later, the first German reinforcements to reach the colony. Upon learning that the colonial governor, Theodor Leutwein, was out of contact in the southern part of the colony, Gudewill assumed temporary command of German forces in the area, as he was the senior-most officer. He sent his executive officer, KL Hans Gygas, ashore with a landing party of fifty-two men and a doctor, to assist the local Schutztruppe defending the town of Karibib. The landing party made their way to Karibib, their progress slowed by rebel attacks on the rail and telegraph lines, but they arrived on 19 January. The next day, a second detachment of twenty-six men, led by one officer, went ashore with five 37 mm (1.5 in) Hotchkiss revolver cannon and two MG 08 machine guns.

On 9 February, a naval expeditionary force arrived aboard the steamer SS Darmstadt to replace the landing party from Habicht, and the commander of the unit took overall command of the forces fighting in the colony. Reports of another Herero force at Otjimbingwe led to the Habicht detachment at Karibib being ordered to march there and attack them on 12 February. Four days later, the Germans drove the Hereros back and dispersed them. The Germans continued on, further inland, toward Okahandja, and on the way they engaged in another battle on 20 February. Gudewill became very sick with malaria and Gygas had to return to take command of the ship in February, while Gudewill was sent home. Not long after, Habicht's landing party returned to the ship, though from 24 April to 2 May, a contingent of thirty men went ashore to take over guard duties from a cavalry unit. KK Robert Kühne arrived in April to take command of the ship. In the course of the fighting during the early stage of the Herero Wars, Habicht's crew suffered significant casualties given the small size of her crew; two officers, two doctors, and nine non-commissioned officers or enlisted sailors were killed. In addition, Gudewill died on 22 July after arriving in Germany.

On 7 May, the arrival of additional Schutztruppe freed up Habicht to return to Cape Town for her overhaul. In addition, Wolf arrived from Kamerun to cover any possible contingencies. Work on the ship concluded by early July, and she departed Cape Town on the 9th. Habicht stopped along the way at Lüderitz Bay and then Swakopmund, before continued on to Kamerun, where she arrived on 14 August. In the first half of September, the ship's crew assisted in the anchoring of the floating dry dock that had been sent to the colony by the Woermann-Linie. Habicht thereafter cruised around the station, visiting ports in the region. On 16 December, she met the protected cruiser Vineta at Sao Paulo de Luanda. The two vessels cruised together briefly, and Kommodore Ludwig von Schröder transferred to Habicht for a voyage up the Congo River in early January 1905. By 18 March, Habicht had returned to Cape Town for her annual overhaul, and that day the crew celebrated the ship's 25th anniversary of entering service. On the return trip to Kamerun, she once again stopped at Swakopmund, before arriving off her station on 20 May. Here, she received orders to return home, but she initially began a final tour of ports in the region. By 25 July, Sperber arrived to replace Habicht, allowing the latter to begin the voyage home on 3 August. She arrived in Kiel on 21 September, before moving on to Danzig, where she was decommissioned on 2 October. The navy quickly disposed of the ship; she was struck from the naval register on 24 March 1906 and sold to ship breakers.
