= SMS Olga =

Screw corvette of the German Imperial Navy

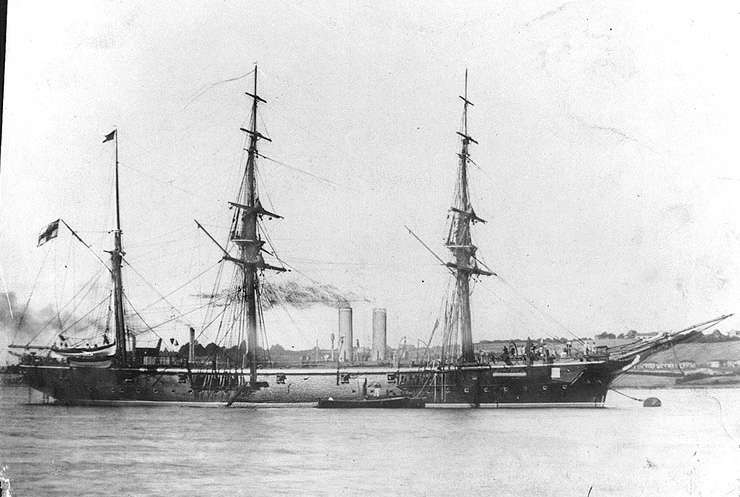
- Olga in Kiel, sometime before 1890

History

German Empire
- Name: Olga
- Namesake: Olga Nikolaevna of Russia
- Ordered: 1878
- Builder: AG Vulcan Stettin
- Laid down: 1879
- Launched: 11 December 1880
- Commissioned: 9 January 1882
- Decommissioned: 30 November 1898
- Fate: Broken up, 1908

General characteristics
- Class & type: Carola-class corvette
- Displacement: Full load: 2,424 t (2,386 long tons)
- Length: 76.35 m (250 ft 6 in)
- Beam: 12.5 m (41 ft)
- Draft: 4.98 m (16 ft 4 in)
- Installed power: 8 × fire-tube boilers; 2,399 metric horsepower (2,366 ihp)
- Propulsion: 1 × screw propeller; 1 × double-expansion steam engine
- Speed: 13.9 knots (25.7 km/h; 16.0 mph)
- Range: 3,420 nautical miles (6,330 km; 3,940 mi) at 10 knots (19 km/h; 12 mph)
- Crew: 10 officers; 265 enlisted men
- Armament: 10 × 15 cm (5.9 in) guns; 2 × 8.7 cm (3.4 in) guns; 6 × 37 mm (1.5 in) Hotchkiss revolver cannon

SMS Olga was the second member of the Carola class of steam corvettes built for the German Kaiserliche Marine (Imperial Navy) in the 1880s. Intended for service in the German colonial empire, the ship was designed with a combination of steam and sail power for extended range, and was equipped with a battery of ten 15-centimeter (5.9 in) guns. Olga was laid down at the AG Vulcan in Stettin in 1879, she was launched in December 1880, and she was completed in January 1882.

In the course of her career, Olga was sent abroad on three major deployments. The first, uneventful voyage came in 1882, and took the vessel to South American waters for a year and a half. During the cruise, Prince Heinrich of Prussia served aboard the ship. The second cruise came shortly thereafter, when the German Admiralty sent her to the German colony of Kamerun as part of the West African Squadron to suppress a rebellion against German rule. Her third cruise took place between 1885 and 1889, and saw the ship alternate between German East Africa and German New Guinea in the central Pacific Ocean. While in Samoa in 1889, Olga was badly damaged by a powerful cyclone and was forced to leave the station for repairs.

From 1890, Olga saw limited service, in a variety of subsidiary roles. She was used as a training ship from 1893 to 1897, when she was transferred to the Fishery School. She conducted an extensive survey in Spitzbergen in 1898 before being decommissioned late in the year, to be converted into a gunnery training ship. She served in that capacity until 1905, when she was stricken from the naval register. Olga was sold for scrap the following year and was broken up in 1908.

== Design ==
The six ships of the Carola class were ordered in the late 1870s to supplement Germany's fleet of cruising warships, which at that time relied on several ships that were twenty years old. Olga and her sister ships were intended to patrol Germany's colonial empire and safeguard German economic interests around the world.

Olga was 76.35 meters (250 ft 6 in) long overall, with a beam of 12.5 m (41 ft) and a draft of 4.98 m (16 ft 4 in) forward. She displaced 2,424 metric tons (2,386 long tons) at full load. The ship's crew consisted of 10 officers and 265 enlisted men. She was powered by a single double-expansion marine steam engine that drove one 2-bladed screw propeller, with steam provided by eight coal-fired fire-tube boilers, which gave her a top speed of 13.9 knots (25.7 km/h; 16.0 mph) at 2,399 metric horsepower (2,366 ihp). She had a cruising radius of 3,420 nautical miles (6,330 km; 3,940 mi) at a speed of 10 knots (19 km/h; 12 mph). As built, Olga was equipped with a three-masted barque rig, but this was later reduced.

Olga was armed with a battery of ten 15 cm (5.9 in) 22-caliber (cal.) breech-loading guns and two 8.7 cm (3.4 in) 24-cal. guns. She also carried six 37 mm (1.5 in) Hotchkiss revolver cannon. Later in her career, her armament was reduced to two 8.8 cm (3.5 in) SK L/30 guns and ten 3.7 cm machine cannon of unrecorded type.

== Service history ==
Olga was ordered as Ersatz Augusta, (Note: German warships were ordered under provisional names. Additions to the fleet were given a single letter; ships intended to replace older or lost vessels were ordered as "Ersatz (name of the ship to be replaced)".) a replacement for the old corvette Augusta, in late 1878; the contract for her construction was awarded to AG Vulcan Stettin. Her keel was laid down there in 1879, and she was launched on 11 December 1880. Konteradmiral (KAdm—Rear Admiral) Carl Ferdinand Batsch gave the speech at her launching ceremony, where she was named for Olga Nikolaevna of Russia, the wife of Charles I of Württemberg. Sea trials began in September 1881, and on 9 January 1882, Olga was pronounced ready for service.

=== First two deployments abroad ===
Olga was assigned to the South America station on 1 October 1882; she left Kiel on 14 October, with then-Leutnant zur See Prince Heinrich of Prussia aboard as the ship's watch officer. Batsch—who had by now been promoted to Vizeadmiral (VAdm–Vice Admiral)—accompanied the vessel aboard the shipyard vessel Notus while she was still in the Baltic Sea. She stopped in Plymouth, Britain, where Prince Heinrich visited his grandmother, Queen Victoria. Heavy storms delayed her departure from Plymouth until 23 October, and she arrived in Bridgetown, Barbados, on 3 December. Olga stayed in Port of Spain, Trinidad and Tobago, from 16 January 1883 to 11 February, and during this period, the ship's captain and Prince Heinrich chartered the steamship SS Arthur to explore the Orinoco river in Venezuela. Olga thereafter visited ports in Venezuela and Brazil. While in Rio de Janeiro, Emperor Pedro II of Brazil visited the ship.

Olga began the voyage back to Germany on 5 January 1884, and on the way had to stop in Plymouth again due to storm damage. While the ship was under repair, Prince Heinrich again went to visit Queen Victoria in London, this time accompanied by Georg Herbert Münster, the German ambassador to Britain. While they were in Paddington and Victoria stations, bombs were placed under Prince Heinrich's seat, though both failed to explode. On reaching Kiel on 13 March, the ship was greeted by Leo von Caprivi, the Chief of the Admiralty, and Prince Heinrich's brother, Crown Prince Wilhelm, the former aboard the ironclad Hansa and the latter aboard Notus.

In August 1884, the Admiralty planned to use Olga for training purposes, but unrest in the German colony of Kamerun necessitated the formation of a West African Squadron; they assigned Olga to the squadron, along with its flagship, the corvette Bismarck, and the corvettes Ariadne and Gneisenau. Olga was accordingly commissioned on 1 October for service with the squadron, and she left Wilhelmshaven on 30 October. She anchored off Douala on 18 December in company with Bismarck. The ships sent landing parties ashore and took part in battles with local forces in the town on 20 and 21 December. The ships' shallow draft allowed them to proceed upriver to provide gunfire support to the men fighting on land. Once the fighting ended, Olga conducted a survey of the Wouri River. She was sent to Togoland to suppress unrest in that colony in early February 1885 before returning to Kamerun in mid-March. She was relieved by the gunboat Habicht on 2 April; at that point, she left western Africa and returned to Germany, arriving in Kiel on 25 May.

=== Third deployment abroad ===
After arriving, Olga went into the shipyard for a major overhaul. She then began her training ship duties, initially in German waters, and then in the training squadron with Stein. This activity lasted until 14 September, when she was again assigned to the African station. This time, the squadron was sent to German East Africa. Olga left Germany on 29 October and arrived in East African waters on 29 December, meeting Bismarck, the flagship of KAdm Eduard von Knorr. Already on 9 February 1886, the squadron was ordered to leave Africa for the central Pacific Ocean. While there, Olga surveyed the coast of New Mecklenburg independently from the rest of the squadron. The ships regrouped in Hong Kong on 23 July, where they underwent maintenance work. While cruising in East Asian waters later that year, Knorr received orders to take the squadron back to German East Africa.

The squadron arrived on 25 December, and Olga was tasked with patrolling the coast of Wituland and raising the German flag in Manda Bay (in present-day Kenya) in January 1887. She was also sent to force the extradition of the murderers of the German explorer Karl Ludwig Jühlke, and transported the men from Kismayo to Zanzibar. In early March 1887, the squadron left East Africa and went to Cape Town, South Africa, due to rising tensions between Germany and France. There, they awaited further orders that might come in the event of war between the two countries. After the situation calmed, the Admiralty sent the ships back to the Pacific on 7 May. They arrived in Sydney, Australia on 9 June; that day, Olga's captain suddenly died and the executive officer took command of the vessel. While in Sydney, the ship went into the dry dock there for an overhaul.

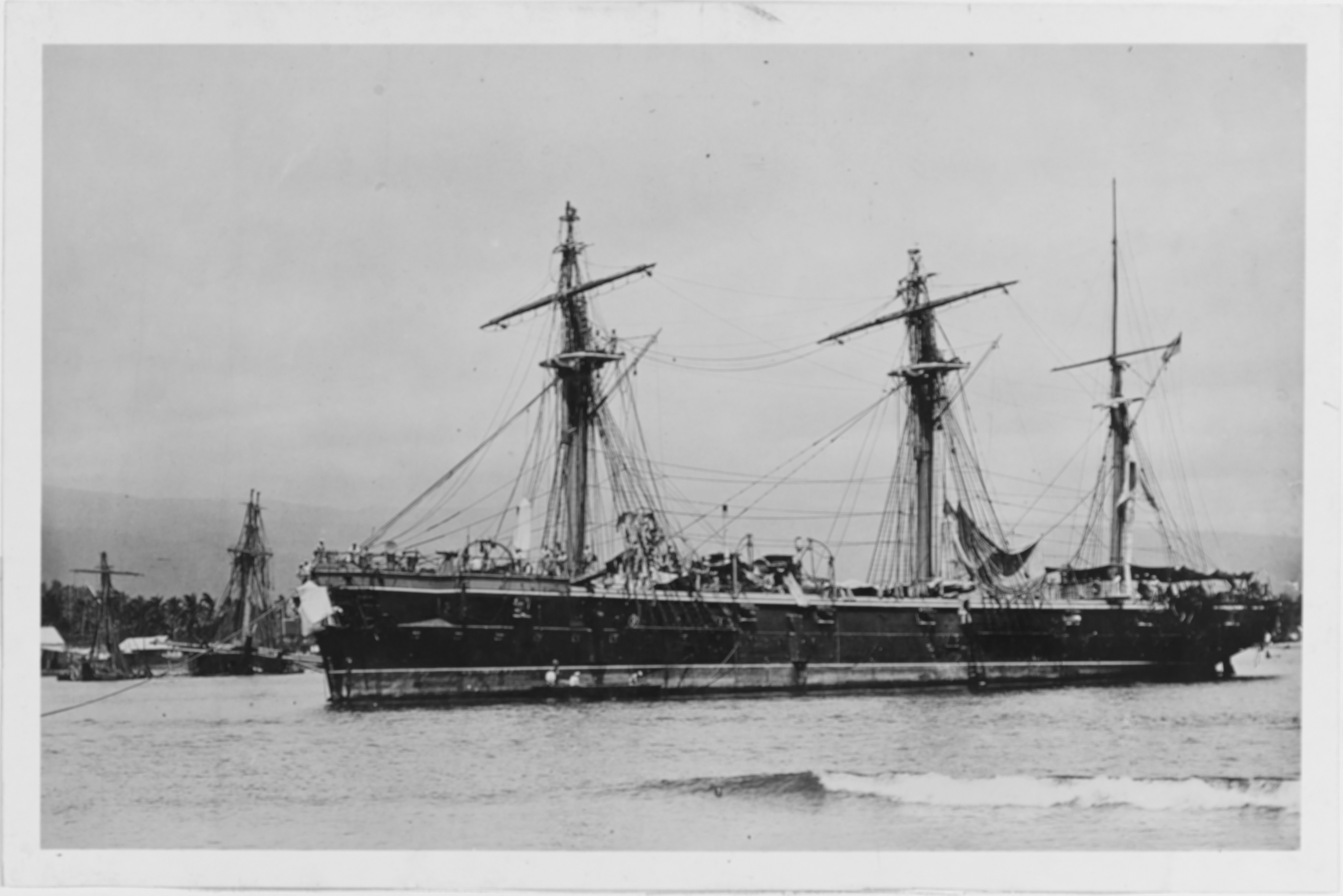
Olga aground in Apia harbor following the 1889 Apia cyclone

The work was completed by August, allowing the squadron to proceed to Samoa. They arrived in Apia on 19 August, and there, a new captain came aboard Olga. She remained in Apia until 27 November, and thereafter went elsewhere in German New Guinea. In April 1888, she was replaced by the gunboat Eber, allowing Olga to rejoin the squadron in Singapore, which she reached on 10 June. The squadron left Singapore on 26 June, bound for another tour in East Africa. In August, she went to several ports in the colony in support of the German East Africa Company and to survey the harbors. On 19 September, the Admiralty ordered Olga to return to Samoa, as tensions in the islands during the Samoan Civil War required the presence of a warship larger than a gunboat. While en route, she embarked the deposed King of Samoa, Malietoa Laupepa, in Aden and carried him first to Jaluit in the Marshall Islands and then to Apia on 14 December.

There, she joined the gunboats Eber and Adler. After German-run plantations at Vailele were attacked by forces commanded by Tupua Tamasese Titimaea, a rival to Laupepa, Olga and the gunboats sent landing parties ashore to defend the plantations. Four days later, they were attacked by Tamasese's forces; in the ensuing First Battle of Vailele, two officers and thirteen men from Olga were killed. The three ships remained in the area until the night of 15–16 March 1889, when a major cyclone struck the island. Olga's captain ran the ship aground to prevent her from being sunk, but Eber and Adler were destroyed in the storm. On 29 March, the Norddeutscher Lloyd steamer SS Lübeck, with the help of Samoans, pulled Olga from the beach. Since Olga had lost all of her anchors, Lübeck escorted her to Sydney with the survivors from Eber and Adler aboard. Repair work lasted for two months, and on 20 June, she left for Germany. While on the way, she was accidentally rammed and lightly damaged by a British steamship in the Suez Canal. Olga reached Kiel on 9 September and proceeded on to the Kaiserliche Werft (Imperial Shipyard) in Danzig for further repairs.

=== Training ship ===
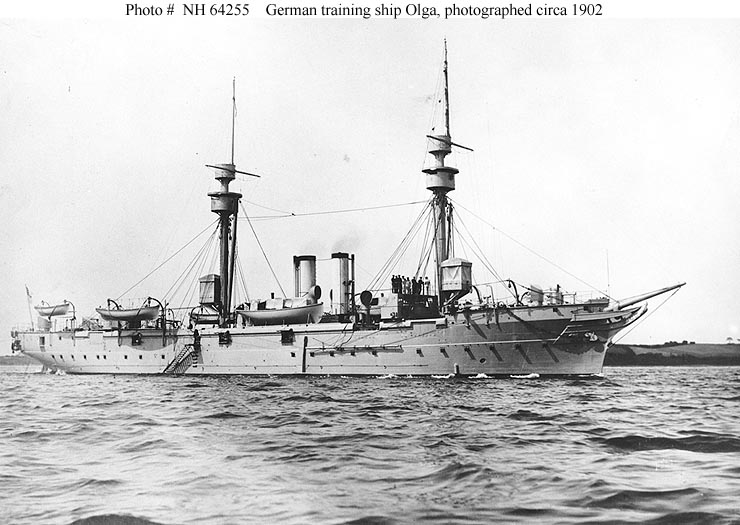
Olga as a training ship in 1902

The Admiralty thereafter decided to employ Olga as a training ship. Her rigging was reduced and she was assigned to the North Sea Naval Station in 1891. Olga was activated for training duties for the first time on 25 July 1893 to take part in divisional exercises with the rest of the fleet that were held every year. These maneuvers concluded on 30 September, after which she was again laid up in Wilhelmshaven. On 31 March 1897, Olga was reclassified as a third-class cruiser, and she was transferred to the Fisheries School in November to replace the old aviso Zieten, which had recently been decommissioned temporarily. During this period, she housed the school during the winter months. After Zieten returned to service on 29 March 1898, the two ships operated together in the North Sea. They cruised in the southern North Sea in April and May that year, returning to Wilhelmshaven on 9 May.

Olga participated in a scientific cruise to the Spitzbergen archipelago with a group of experts from the German Sea Fishing Association. She left Wilhelmshaven on 22 June and arrived off Bären island in early July. She surveyed the island from 4 to 7 July and gathered sounding measurements around the coast, and thereafter worked north of the island. Olga returned to Germany on 28 August. Her presence in the archipelago caused a sensation in Russia, and the Russian Navy sent a cruiser there in July to claim the islands for Russia.

Olga returned to fishery protection service in the North Sea on 4 October, though this was interrupted later that month by a training cruise to Vigo, Spain. On 30 November, after having returned to Germany, she was decommissioned. She was transferred to the gunnery training school in 1900, and she was converted in the Kaiserliche Werft in Wilhelmshaven for that purpose. She received a new battery of two 8.8 cm guns and ten 3.7 cm machine cannon. She remained in service in this role until February 1905, when she was replaced by the light cruiser Nymphe. During her service as a gunnery training ship, she took part in the annual fleet maneuvers in August and September 1904. Olga was stricken from the naval register on 29 March 1905, sold the following year, and broken up for scrap in Hamburg in 1908.
