= First Battle of Vailele =

Battle in the First Samoan Civil War

- Part of the Samoan Civil War
Date	18 December 1888
Location	Vailele
Result	Mata'afaite victory

Belligerents
German Empire	Mata'afaite Samoans

Casualties and losses
16 marines dead	Unknown

The First Battle of Vailele occurred on 18 December 1888 at the German plantation of Vailele as part of the First Samoan Civil War. Sixteen German marines were ambushed and killed by forces loyal to Mata'afa Iosefo.

A memorial for the Germans killed at the battle was erected in a ceremony presided over by the commander of the unprotected cruiser Sperber.

== See also ==
- Second Battle of Vailele
