= SMS Moltke (1877) =

Screw corvette of the German Imperial Navy

- Moltke in the 1890s as a school ship

History

German Empire
- Name: SMS Moltke
- Namesake: Field Marshal Helmuth von Moltke the Elder
- Builder: Kaiserliche Werft, Danzig
- Laid down: July 1875
- Launched: 18 October 1877
- Commissioned: 16 April 1878
- Decommissioned: 7 April 1908
- Fate: Sold for scrap, 7 July 1920

General characteristics
- Class & type: Bismarck-class corvette
- Displacement: Full load: 2,994 t (2,947 long tons)
- Length: 82 m (269 ft)
- Beam: 13.7 m (44 ft 11 in)
- Draft: 5.2 m (17 ft 1 in)
- Installed power: 2,500 ihp (1,900 kW); 4 × fire-tube boilers
- Propulsion: 1 × screw propeller; 1 × marine steam engine
- Speed: 13.9 knots (25.7 km/h; 16.0 mph)
- Range: 2,380 nmi (4,410 km; 2,740 mi) at 9 knots (17 km/h; 10 mph)
- Complement: 18 officers; 386 sailors
- Armament: 10 × 15 cm (5.9 in) guns; 2 × 88 mm (3.5 in) quick-firing guns; 6 × 37 mm (1.5 in) 5-barreled guns

SMS Moltke was a Bismarck-class corvette built for the German Imperial Navy (Kaiserliche Marine) in the late 1870s. The ship was named after the Prussian Field Marshal Helmuth von Moltke the Elder. She was the fourth member of the class, which included five other vessels. The Bismarck-class corvettes were ordered as part of a major naval construction program in the early 1870s, and she was designed to serve as a fleet scout and on extended tours in Germany's colonial empire. Moltke was laid down in July 1875, launched in October 1877, and was commissioned into the fleet in April 1878. She was armed with a battery of ten 15 cm (5.9 in) guns and had a full ship rig to supplement her steam engine on long cruises abroad.

Moltke went on one major overseas deployment in the 1880s to South America. There, she visited ports in several South American countries in the aftermath of the War of the Pacific and carried the German expedition for the International Polar Year to South Georgia Island. After returning to Germany in 1885, she became a training ship for naval cadets and later apprentice seamen. The ship served in this capacity from 1885 to 1908, during which time her activity consisted primarily of fleet training exercises and overseas training cruises. These cruises frequently went to the West Indies and Mediterranean Sea. She was stricken from the naval register in October 1910, converted into a barracks ship, and assigned to the U-boat school in Kiel. In October 1911, Moltke was renamed Acheron and she served in this capacity until 1920, when she was sold to ship breakers in July and subsequently dismantled for scrap.

== Design ==
An unidentified Bismarck-class corvette

The six ships of the Bismarck class were ordered in the early 1870s to supplement Germany's fleet of cruising warships, which at that time relied on several ships that were twenty years old. Moltke and her sister ships were intended to patrol Germany's colonial empire and safeguard German economic interests around the world. They were designed as a smaller and more economical version of the preceding Leipzig-class corvettes.

oltke was 82 meters (269 ft) long overall, with a beam of 13.7 m (44 ft 11 in) and a draft of 5.2 m (17 ft 1 in) forward. She displaced 2,994 metric tons (2,947 long tons) at full load. The ship's crew consisted of 18 officers and 386 enlisted men. Her hull had a straight stem and was sheathed with zinc to prevent marine biofouling on long voyages abroad.

She was powered by a single marine steam engine that drove one 2-bladed screw propeller, with steam provided by four coal-fired fire-tube boilers, which was vented through a single, retractable funnel. Her propulsion system gave her a top speed of 13.9 knots (25.7 km/h; 16.0 mph) at 2,334 metric horsepower (2,302 ihp). She had a cruising radius of 2,380 nautical miles (4,410 km; 2,740 mi) at a speed of 9 knots (17 km/h; 10 mph). As built, Moltke was equipped with a full ship rig, but this was later reduced.

Moltke was armed with a battery of sixteen 15 cm (5.9 in) 22-caliber (cal.) breech-loading guns and four 8 cm (3.1 in) 25-cal. guns. Her armament was revised several times during her career; by 1890, the number of 15 cm guns had been reduced to ten. She also had six 3.7 cm (1.5 in) Hotchkiss revolver cannon installed for close-range defense against torpedo boats. During another refit in the early 1890s, her main battery was restored to sixteen guns. In 1895, a pair of 8.8 cm (3.5 in) guns were added, along with four 6 cm (2.4 in) guns. In the early 1900s, she was rearmed with a pair of 10.5 cm (4.1 in) guns, ten 8.8 cm guns, and four 3.7 cm guns.

== Service history ==
Moltke was the first member of the Bismarck class to be laid down; construction began in July 1875 under the contract name Ersatz Arcona at the Kaiserliche Werft (Imperial Shipyard) in Danzig. (Note: German warships were ordered under provisional names. Additions to the fleet were given a single letter; ships intended to replace older or lost vessels were ordered as "Ersatz (name of the ship to be replaced)".) Work proceeded more slowly on Moltke than her sister Bismarck, since the government shipyards were not as experienced as the private builders like Norddeutsche Schiffbau AG that built Bismarck; Moltke proved to be the fourth member of the class to be launched and the class bore Bismarck's name rather than Moltke's as a result. At the launching ceremony for Moltke on 18 October 1877, Admiral Albrecht von Stosch christened the ship with the ship's namesake, Generalfeldmarschall (Field Marshal) Helmuth von Moltke, in attendance. Fitting-out work was completed by April 1878, and on the 16th she was commissioned for initial service. She was transferred to Kiel on 28–29 April, where her armament and other final pieces of equipment were installed. She began sea trials on 18 November, which were completed on 21 December.

=== Deployment to South America ===
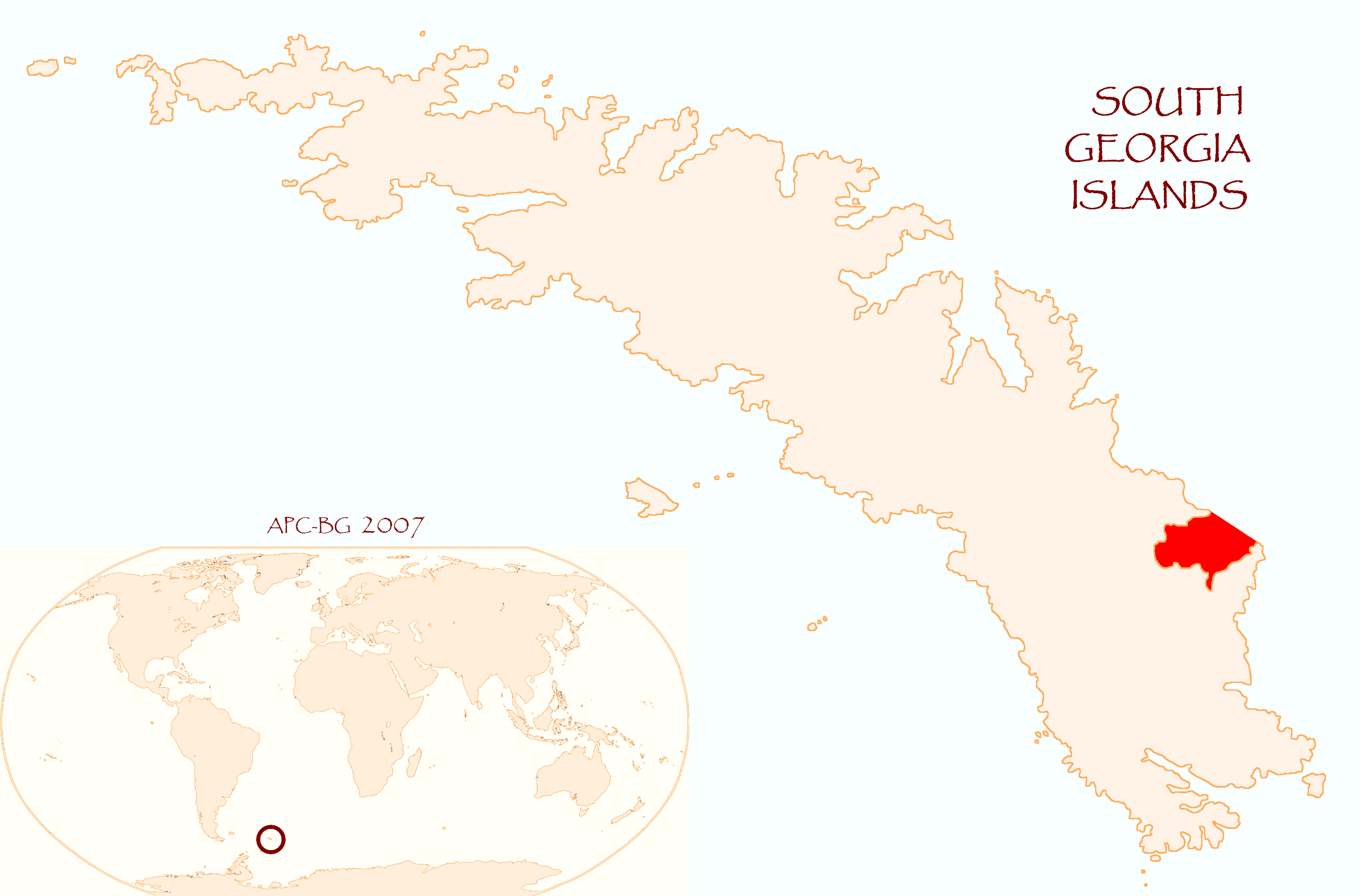
Map of Royal Bay (in red), where Moltke brought the International Polar Year expedition

Moltke was formally activated on 1 April 1881 for an overseas deployment to South America, which she began on 17 April. After arriving in Valparaíso, Chile on 14 July, she replaced the corvette Ariadne and proceeded to Coquimbo, Chile, where riots due to the Peruvian victory in the War of the Pacific threatened Germans in the city. She arrived there on 19 July and remained there until mid-September, when she toured several port cities in Peru over the following two months. Moltke thereafter went further north and visited cities in Central America, including San José, Costa Rica. On 16 February 1882, Moltke returned to Valparaíso and on 14 March sailed north to Coquimbo. She remained there until 17 May, when she departed for Montevideo, Uruguay, but due to severe storms in the Strait of Magellan forced her to wait, and she was able to reach Montevideo only in late June.

In Montevideo, Moltke embarked the scientific expedition Germany contributed to the first International Polar Year, which was to spend a year on South Georgia Island making scientific observations on a range of phenomena, including disturbances in the geomagnetic field. Moltke left Montevideo with the expedition aboard on 23 July, with their equipment carried aboard the HSDG steamship SS Rio; the two ships arrived at the island on 12 August after navigating heavy seas and icebergs. It took more than a week to find a suitable landing site, and on 21 August, the scientists went ashore at what is now known as Moltke Harbor on the north side of Royal Bay, which was named for the ship. They finished unloading their equipment and setting up their housing on 24 August with the help of the crew, and on 3 September, Moltke departed for other tasks. The corvette Marie arrived the following year to retrieve the expedition.

After leaving South George Island, Moltke sailed to Port Stanley in the Falkland Islands, and from there she returned to the west coast of South America. Beginning on 20 October, she visited several Chilean ports and the Juan Fernández Islands. She returned to Valparaíso in late January 1883, where she met the corvette Leipzig. Leipzig went to visit Hawaii while Moltke remained off South America, though she sailed north to tour Peru and Ecuador, beginning on 28 February. After returning to Valparaíso, Moltke received the order to return to Germany on 8 July. While passing through the Strait of Magellan, she conducted a survey of coastal waters. On 4 August, she met her replacement, Marie, before continuing north into the Atlantic. Moltke stopped in Porto Grande in the Cape Verde Islands while en route, and she reached Kiel on 2 October; she was decommissioned there on 23 October.

=== Training ship ===
==== 1885–1889 ====
Illustration of Moltke in heavy seas

Moltke returned to service on 15 April 1885 for use as a training ship for naval cadets. Shortly thereafter, she went on a training cruise in the Baltic Sea, and on 20 May, began a tour of Norwegian ports. She then crossed the northern Atlantic to Iceland, stopping in the Berufjörður and visiting Reykjavík. She left Iceland and on 2 July stopped in Lough Swilly, Ireland, where she stayed for a month. She then sailed to Portsmouth, Britain where on 15 August she received the order to return to Germany immediately to join the Training Squadron, which was to participate in the annual fleet exercises from 30 August to 23 September. After the conclusion of the maneuvers, she went to the Kaiserliche Werft in Kiel on 25 September for maintenance in preparation for the next training cruise.

Moltke rejoined the Training Squadron on 1 October, and the ships embarked on the next training cruise on 11 October, sailing to the West Indies. While on the way, the squadron stopped in São Vicente, Cape Verde from 13 to 30 November, during a period of tension between Germany and Spain over competing claims to the Caroline Islands in the central Pacific. After the conflict was resolved, the ships were ordered to continue their voyage. While in the West Indies, Moltke visited Port of Spain. The ships arrived back in Wilhelmshaven on 27 March 1886, where the squadron was dissolved. Moltke went into the Kaiserliche Werft in Kiel for an overhaul in April, after which the squadron was reformed for the 1886 training year. During the fleet maneuvers in August and September, the ships served as the II Division. On 14 October, the squadron began the winter training cruise, which again went to the West Indies and concluded in Wilhelmshaven on 30 March 1887.

Moltke went to Kiel on 3 June to take part in a celebration marking the beginning of construction on the Kaiser Wilhelm Canal, after which she took part in the annual fleet maneuvers. On 1 October, the Training Squadron began the winter cruise to the Mediterranean, and in December, while in Sanremo they took part in a naval review for then-Crown Prince Friedrich Wilhelm, who succeeded his father, Kaiser Wilhelm I after the latter's death on 9 March 1888. The ships arrived back in Wilhelmshaven on 10 April, after which Moltke went to Kiel eight days later for another overhaul. The training year for 1888 was interrupted by the death of Friedrich Wilhelm after just three months on the throne, and Moltke's next activity was a trip to Russian and Scandinavian ports for the new Kaiser, Wilhelm II. The annual fleet maneuvers followed in August and September, and on 29 September, the winter training cruise to the Mediterranean began. Moltke visited numerous ports in Greece, Austria-Hungary, Italy, and the Ottoman Empire before the squadron returned to Wilhelmshaven on 16 April 1889. The squadron was then disbanded and Moltke was decommissioned on 30 April.

==== 1889–1897 ====
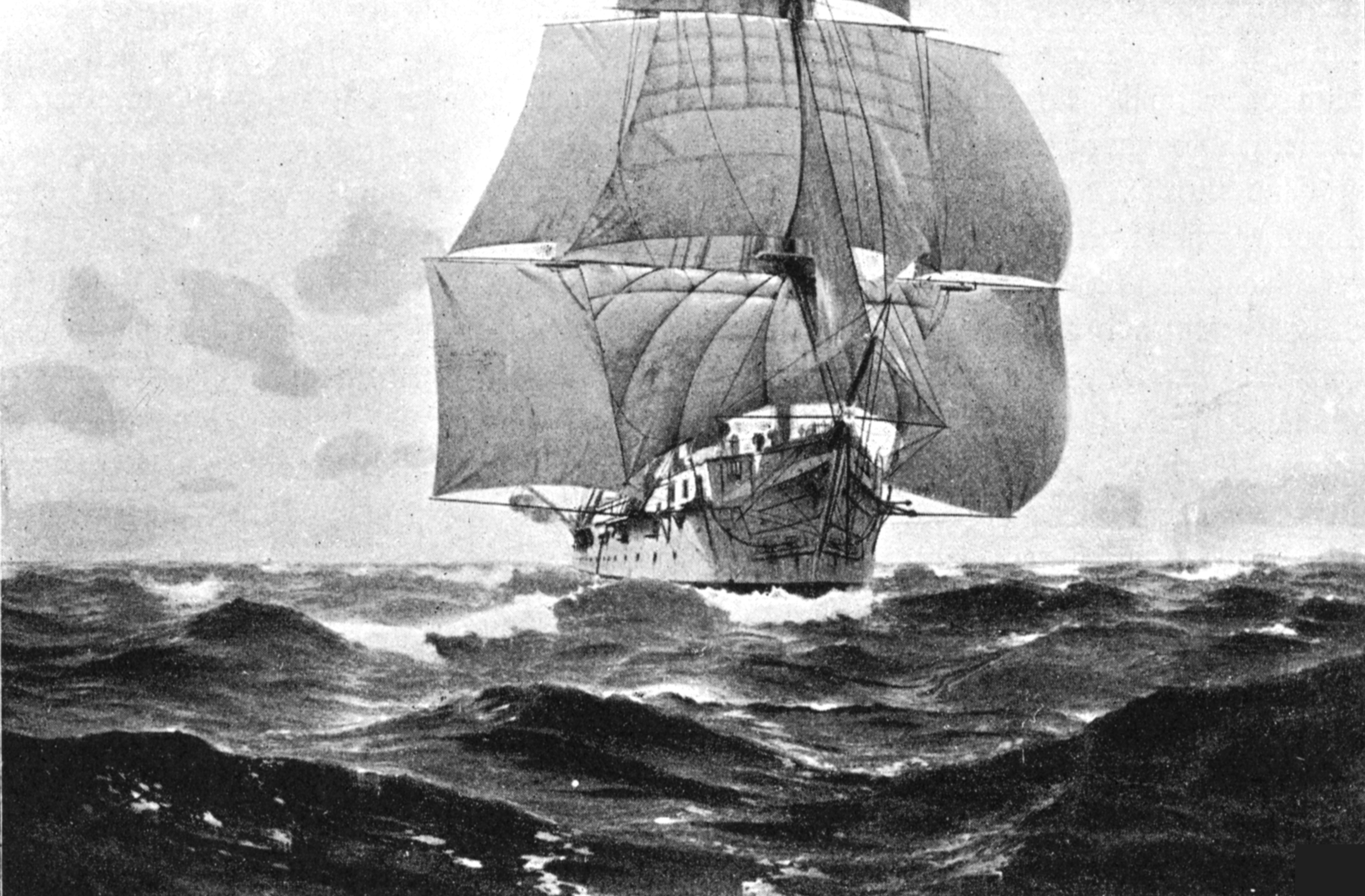
Illustration of Moltke under sail, c. 1895

The ship was taken into the Kaiserliche Werft in Kiel for an extensive reconstruction, which included new boilers, new quick-firing guns, and housing arrangements for up to 50 cadets and 210 Schiffsjungen (apprentice seamen). Her rigging was also reduced. On 1 January 1891, she was formally assigned to the list of training ships, and she returned to service on 7 April; the ship's namesake and Wilhelm II attended this recommissioning ceremony. Moltke had to send a delegation to Berlin just three weeks later on 28 April for the funeral of Moltke, who had died four days before. Moltke began another training cruise on 15 June, visiting the West Indies, La Guaira, Venezuela, and Bahía Blanca, Argentina. While on the way back to Germany, she stopped in Norfolk, United States on 13 June 1892, and the Isle of Wight for the Cowes Regatta in early August. Here, she joined Wilhelm II aboard his yacht, Hohenzollern, before continuing on to Kiel, arriving on 9 August. She joined the fleet maneuvers immediately thereafter, and was decommissioned on 30 September after their conclusion.

Moltke returned to service on 5 April 1893 and she conducted training in the Baltic Sea, which lasted until 8 June. During this period, she suffered a serious accident on 24 May, when the steamship SS Helene accidentally collided with one of Moltke's dinghies and capsized it, killing six Schiffsjungen. Moltke joined the fleet maneuvers as part of III Division, beginning on 20 August and continuing until 22 September. The winter cruise began on 14 October and went to the Mediterranean. Moltke visited Piraeus on 21 January 1894, where she was visited by Wilhelm II, his sister Sophia of Prussia, and her husband, Crown Prince Constantine of Greece. Wilhelm arranged the visit over the objections of Chancellor Leo von Caprivi, who opposed a friendly visit due to the Greek government's stoppage of payments toward foreign loans, many of which were held by Germany. A week later, Moltke went to Corfu, where she stayed for four weeks.

While Moltke was in Corfu, she received orders to sail to Abbazia, where Kaiserin Friedrich was staying at a spa. Moltke took Kaiserin Friedrich aboard and transported her to Fiume, where she met the Austro-Hungarian Kaiser Franz Joseph I on 29 March. On 6 April, Franz Joseph I came aboard the ship as well for a trip to Pola for a naval review of the Austro-Hungarian Navy. Moltke then took Kaiserin Friedrich to Venice from 16 to 18 April, where she met with the Italian King Umberto I. On 28 April, Moltke began the voyage back to Germany, arriving in Kiel on 18 June. She returned to the Training Squadron on 14 August, which during the fleet maneuvers became II Squadron. The annual winter cruise followed on 25 September, this time going to the West Indies and concluding on 22 March 1895.

Moltke began individual training thereafter, though this was interrupted in June by a celebration marking the opening of the Kaiser Wilhelm Canal. Moltke then went on a cruise in the Baltic that lasted until 12 July, after which she visited Edinburgh, Scotland. She returned to Germany for the annual maneuvers, which lasted from 13 August to 17 September. A week later, she embarked on the winter cruise to the Mediterranean; while in Cádiz, Spain, she received orders to proceed to Smyrna in the Ottoman Empire as quickly as possible, since unrest in the area threatened Germans in the city. She arrived there on 15 November, joining the aviso Loreley, which was the station ship in Constantinople. In January 1896, Moltke was withdrawn to continue her training duties, and she visited numerous ports in the region, including Messina, Haifa, Port Said, and Naples. She returned to Kiel on 23 March and went into the shipyard for another overhaul.

The training program for 1896 began on 12 May with a cruise in the Baltic, followed by a visit to Britain and Ireland that began on 26 June. While touring the country, Moltke accidentally ran aground lightly off the Hebrides on 17 July, but she was able to free herself without incurring any damage. She arrived back in Kiel on 2 August, after which she joined III Division for the annual fleet maneuvers. On 26 September, the winter cruise to the West Indies began, but while in Madiera, Moltke was diverted to the coast of Syria in the Ottoman Empire to protect German interests in the area that were threatened by civil unrest. She was joined in this operation by her sisters Stosch, Stein, and Gneisenau. Moltke was able to return to Germany, leaving Alexandria on 10 February 1897 and arriving in Wilhelmshaven on 17 March. She then moved to Kiel, and while en route, an accident with one of her anchor chains injured 13 men. She was decommissioned in Kiel on 14 April for repairs.

==== 1898–1920 ====
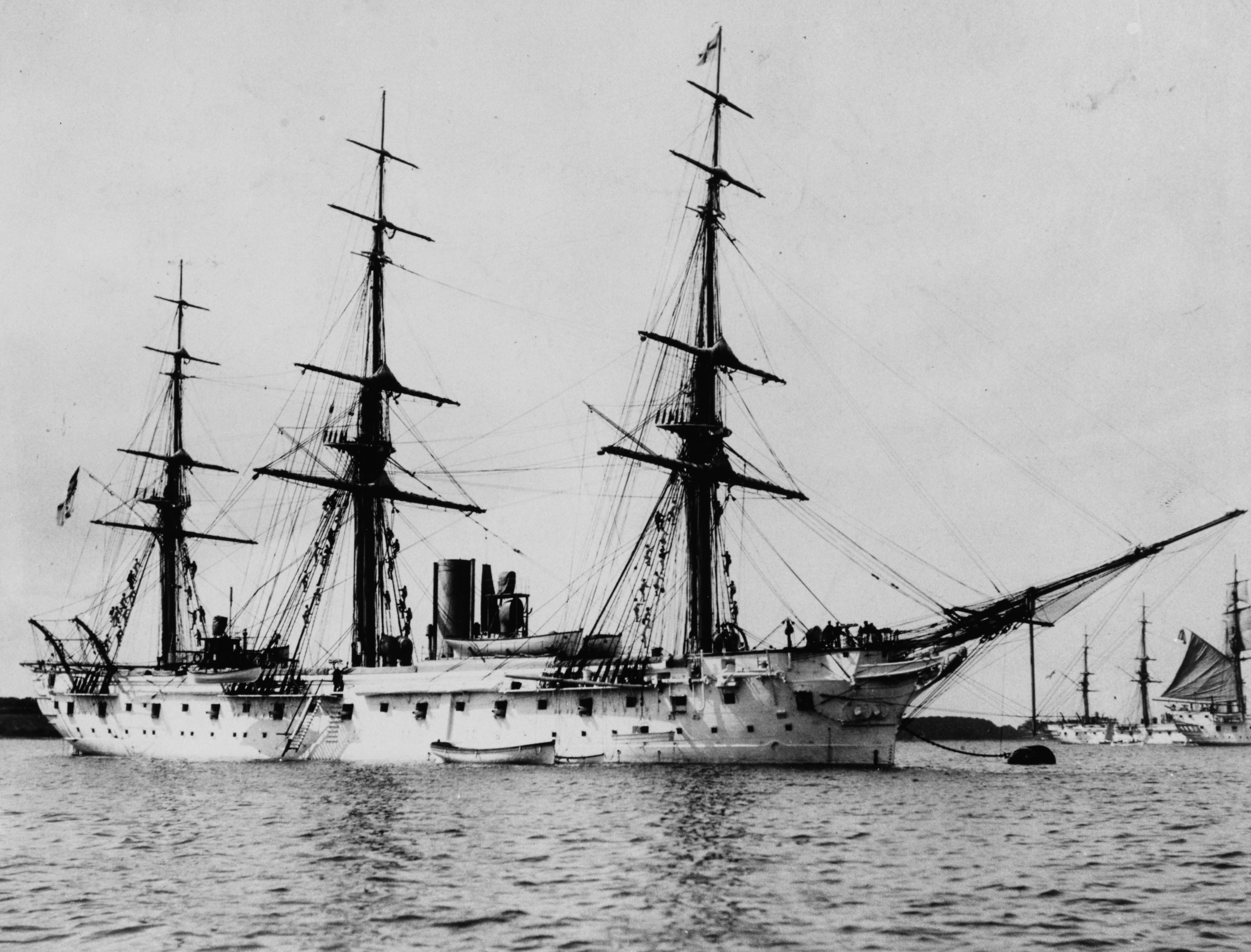
Moltke in 1898 in Kiel

The ship remained out of service until 5 April 1898, when she was recommissioned; training cruises in the Baltic had to be stopped on 16 June due to an outbreak of measles among the ship's crew. In July, she began a tour of Norwegian ports, including stops in Larvik, Bergen, and Odda, where on 7 July she met Hohenzollern and the aviso Hela. Moltke and Hohenzollern then went to Trondheim, before Moltke proceeded alone to Lerwick in the Shetland Islands. She arrived back in Kiel on 30 July. In the second half of August, she served in V Division for the fleet maneuvers, though she left on 3 September for a cruise to the West Indies. While she was in the area, the United States defeated Spain in the Spanish–American War, and Germany feared that unrest in Cuba would threaten Germans, so she was sent to Havana. Her presence proved to be unnecessary, and so on 10 January 1899, she left the city and returned to Kiel, arriving there on 23 March.

Moltke embarked on another cruise in the Baltic on 24 May 1899, followed by another cruise to the West Indies on 5 July. This voyage included a tour of South American ports, including Rio de Janeiro. From 22 to 29 December, she stayed in Charlotte Amalie on the island of Saint Thomas. She visited New Orleans from 10 to 20 January 1900, the first time a German warship stopped in the city, before returning to Germany, arriving in Kiel on 25 March. Several Baltic cruises followed between 25 May and 28 July, and then again from 11 August to 12 September, the latter period including visits to Stockholm, Copenhagen, and Stavanger. She embarked on another cruise to the Mediterranean on 17 September, and while in Gibraltar from 9 to 14 October, 200 men of the crew organized a commemoration ceremony at the cemetery where crew from the corvette Danzig who had been killed at the Battle of Tres Forcas in 1856. Moltke stopped in Beirut on 7 December, where her commander participated in a ceremony at the tomb of Saladin. She visited other ports in the region, and on 24 January 1901, entered the Dardanelles after having received permission from Sultan Abdul Hamid II of the Ottoman Empire. She left the straits on 30 January, and arrived back in Kiel on 24 February.

The ship was overhauled on returning to Germany before beginning a hydrographic survey of the Adlergrund on 21 May, where the battleship Kaiser Friedrich III had run around and been badly damaged earlier that year. The survey work ended on 18 June, and on 1 August, she began the annual training cruise, which began with visits to Copenhagen and the Faroe Islands and continued on to the West Indies, where a conflict between Venezuela and Colombia threatened German economic interests. She left the area on 19 December and proceeded north to Baltimore, arriving on 24 January 1902 and then visiting Washington, D.C., where she was visited by President Theodore Roosevelt, and then stopping in Annapolis, the site of the US Naval Academy. She then returned across the Atlantic, stopping in Dartmouth to celebrate the laying of the cornerstone of the new building at the Royal Naval College. Moltke arrived in Kiel on 20 March.

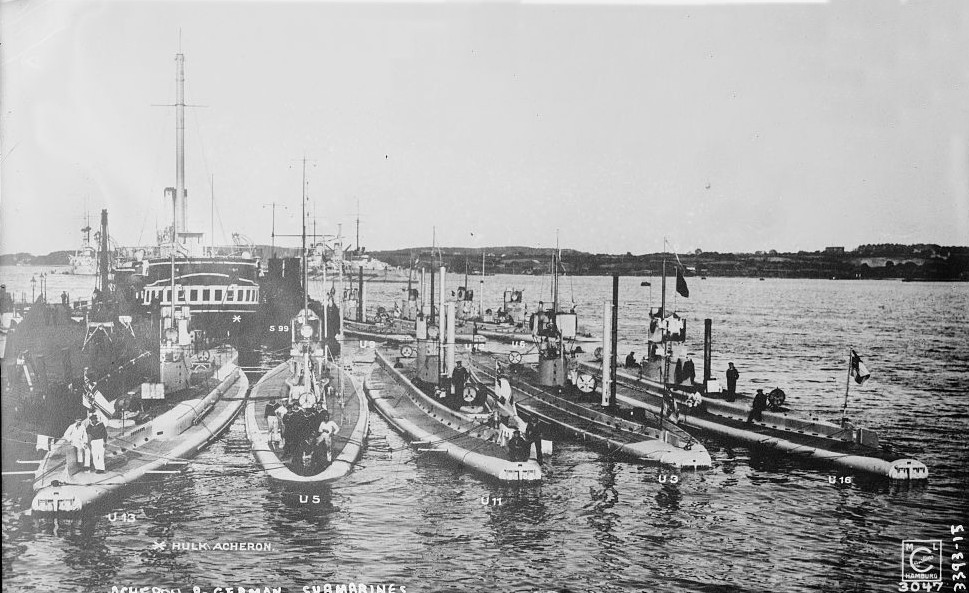
Moltke serving as a U-boat tender

A training cruise in the Baltic followed from 17 May to 17 June, after which Moltke embarked on the next major overseas cruise, with stops in Stockholm, Drontheim, and Funchal on the way to the Mediterranean. She cruised in the western end of the Mediterranean Sea beginning on 1 January 1903, and arrived back in Kiel on 24 March. A fire broke out aboard the ship on 6 April, necessitating repairs at the Kaiserliche Werft in Kiel that lasted approximately five weeks. She then went on a cruise in the Baltic, before departing for another Mediterranean cruise on 7 August. Stops during this voyage included Fiume, Corfu, and Constantinople; heavy storms forced her to stop in Santander, Spain. The ship returned to Kiel on 21 March 1904. As was typical, a cruise in the Baltic followed on 16 May, after which she went on another cruise to the West Indies and the United States that ended on 17 March 1905. She was decommissioned in Kiel on 31 March for an overhaul.

Moltke remained out of service until 4 April 1907 when she was recommissioned for the last time. She made a cruise in the Baltic, followed by a voyage to South American waters, which included a visit to Rio de Janeiro and a tour of the West Indies. This proved to be the last time Moltke went to sea; she arrived back in Kiel on 23 March 1908, where she was decommissioned on 7 April, her place in the Training Squadron having been taken by the protected cruiser Hertha. Moltke was stricken from the naval register on 24 October 1910, having been allocated to the U-boat school in Kiel. She was then converted into a barracks ship and renamed Acheron on 28 October 1911 so her name could be used for the battlecruiser Moltke that had just entered service. Acheron served in this capacity until 7 July 1920, when she was sold and thereafter broken up.
