= Bismarck-class corvette =

Screw corvette class of the German Imperial Navy

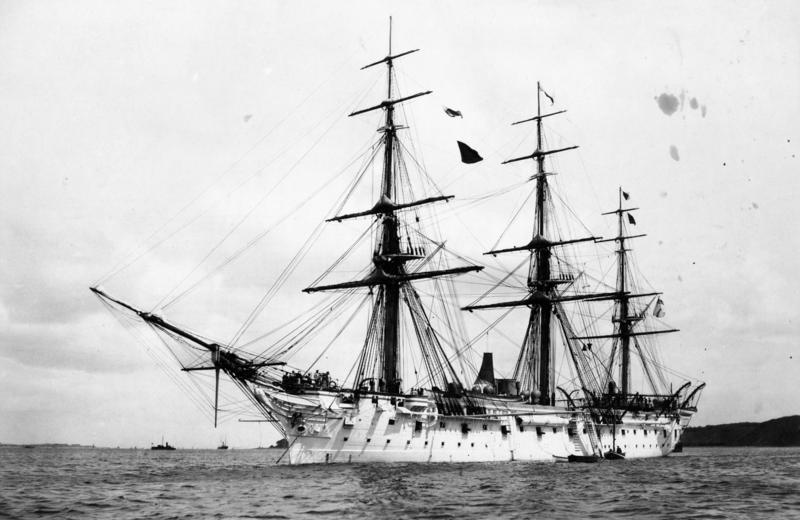
- Stein at anchor in 1893

Class overview
- Builders: AG Vulcan (2); Kaiserliche Werft Danzig (2); Norddeutsche Schiffbau (2)
- Operators: Imperial German Navy
- Preceded by: Leipzig class
- Succeeded by: Carola class
- Built: 1875–1880
- In commission: 1878–1910
- Completed: 6
- Lost: 1
- Scrapped: 5

General characteristics
- Type: Screw corvette
- Displacement: Full load: 2,994 to 3,386 t (2,947 to 3,333 long tons)
- Length: 82–82.5 m (269 ft 0 in – 270 ft 8 in)
- Beam: 13.7 m (44 ft 11 in)
- Draft: 5.2 to 5.68 m (17 ft 1 in to 18 ft 8 in)
- Installed power: 2,334 to 2,989 metric horsepower (2,302 to 2,948 ihp); 4 × fire-tube boilers
- Propulsion: 1 × screw propeller; 1 × marine steam engine
- Speed: 12.5 to 13.9 knots (23.2 to 25.7 km/h; 14.4 to 16.0 mph)
- Range: 2,380 nmi (4,410 km; 2,740 mi) at 9 knots (17 km/h; 10 mph)
- Complement: 18 officers; 386 sailors
- Armament: 10–16 × 15 cm (5.9 in) guns; 2 × 88 mm (3.5 in) quick-firing guns; 6 × 37 mm (1.5 in) 5-barreled guns

The Bismarck-class corvettes were a class of six corvettes built for the German Kaiserliche Marine (Imperial Navy) in the 1870s. The six ships were Bismarck, Blücher, Stosch, Moltke, Gneisenau, and Stein. The Bismarck-class corvettes were ordered as part of a major naval construction program in the early 1870s, and they were designed to serve as fleet scouts and on extended tours in Germany's colonial empire. The ships were armed with a battery of between ten and sixteen 15 cm (5.9 in) guns and they had a full ship rig to supplement their steam engine on long cruises abroad. One ship, Blücher, was converted into a torpedo testing and training ship shortly after she was completed, having her guns replaced with a variety of torpedo launchers.

Most of the members of the class were sent on extended foreign cruises throughout their careers, frequently to support the expansion of Germany's colonial empire through the 1880s. Moltke supported one of the German expeditions for the International Polar Year in 1882. Bismarck was involved in the seizure of the colony of Kamerun in 1884, and she, Gneisenau, and Stosch were used to secure the protectorate of Wituland in 1885–1886, which later became German East Africa. Members of the class also cruised off South America to protect German interests, particularly during the War of the Pacific.

Blücher and Stein served their entire careers as training ships, with the former training most German torpedo crews between the 1880s and 1900s and the latter being used to train naval cadets and apprentice seamen. Gneisenau, Moltke, and Stosch were also used as training ships later in their careers. In this role, they were used for long-range training cruises, primarily to the West Indies and the Mediterranean Sea. Bismarck was the first member of the class to be disposed of, being converted into a barracks ship in 1891. Gneisenau was wrecked off Málaga in a gale. Blücher was badly damaged by a boiler explosion in 1907 and sold thereafter. Stosch was sold for scrap the same year, and in 1908, Stein was also converted into a barracks ship. Moltke continued in service until 1910, when she was decommissioned; the next year, she too was converted into a barracks ship and renamed Acheron. The surviving members of the class were broken up in 1920 after the end of World War I.

== Design ==
Following the German victory in the Franco-Prussian War of 1870–1871, the northern and southern German states unified into the German Empire in January 1871; at the same time, the Kaiserliche Marine (Imperial Navy) came into being, almost entirely from the North German Federal Navy, which was itself dominated by the old Prussian Navy. Kaiser Wilhelm I created the Kaiserliche Admiralität (Imperial Admiralty) to govern the navy on 30 November 1871, and placed General Albrecht von Stosch as its head as the admiralty chief. At the same time, the Reichstag (Imperial Diet) requested an update on the progress of the fleet plan thus far. By then, the navy had completed nine of the corvettes and another four were under construction, leaving another seven due to be built by 1877. As German commercial interests began to expand to overseas markets in Asia and the Pacific in the 1870s, the need for long-range cruising warships became increasingly severe, particularly as other European powers started to exclude German businesses from activity abroad.

The Reichstag was displeased with the state of the fleet, and on 28 May 1872, ordered a revision of the plan. One of the chief issues that confronted Stosch as the new head of the navy was the strategic purpose of his fleet. He believed the primary purposes of the fleet were to defend the German coast and to protect German merchant shipping abroad. The large and expensive capital ships that had already been acquired in the late 1860s were sufficient to accomplish the former task, and so Stosch preferred focusing on a fleet of cruising vessels for the commerce protection mission. The need for cruisers was particularly greater because some of the corvettes counted in the fleet's active list were already twenty years old. Accordingly, he retained the number of corvettes as originally prescribed in the fleet plan that was ultimately approved in April 1873.

Thereafter, Kaiserliche Marine began an expansion program to strengthen the fleet to meet the demands imposed by Germany's increased economic activities abroad and to prepare it for a potential future conflict with France. The naval command determined that modern screw corvettes were necessary for scouting purposes, as well as overseas cruising duties to protect German interests abroad. The first two ships begun under the plan became the Leipzig class, but these proved to be very expensive, and they were too slow to serve as effective fleet scouts. The naval leadership accepted that scouting could not be performed without building even costlier vessels; the perpetually underfunded navy therefore decided to develop a smaller, cheaper design between 1873 and 1875 for its next class. These became the six ships of the Bismarck class; they were effectively a scaled down version of the Leipzig class, although the Bismarcks featured some minor changes, including an altered hull shape. They also experimented with zinc instead of the traditional copper sheathing, in the hope that the resulting electrolysis would prevent biofouling, but it proved to be a failure in service.

=== Characteristics ===
The ships of the Bismarck class varied slightly in dimensions. At the waterline, the ships were 72.18 to 72.2 meters (236 ft 10 in to 236 ft 11 in) long, and 82 to 82.5 meters (269 ft 0 in to 270 ft 8 in) long overall. They had a beam of 13.7 m (44 ft 11 in) and a draft of 5.2 to 5.68 m (17 ft 1 in to 18 ft 8 in) forward and 6.18 to 6.3 m (20 ft 3 in to 20 ft 8 in) aft. They displaced 2,756 to 2,856 metric tons (2,712 to 2,811 long tons) normally and up to 2,994 to 3,386 t (2,947 to 3,333 long tons) at full load. The ships' hulls were constructed with transverse iron frames, to which the iron hull plating was riveted. It was then covered with one layer of teak planks, which were sheathed with zinc to prevent biofouling on extended cruises abroad, where shipyard facilities were not readily available. They had a double bottom below the engine room. The ships had a straight stem.

The ship's crew consisted of 18 officers and 386 enlisted men, though this varied widely later in their careers when they were used as training ships. Their typical complement in that role was 20 officers and 449 sailors, of whom 50 were naval cadets and 210 were Schiffsjungen (apprentice seamen), though Gneisenau typically had 17 officers and 443 sailors, of whom 20 were cadets and 220 were Schiffsjungen. Blücher, which spent her entire career as a torpedo training ship, varied in crew size between 14 and 34 officers and 287 and 494 sailors. Each ship carried a variety of small boats, including one picket boat, two (later six) cutters, two yawls, and two dinghies. Blücher instead had six picket boats, two launches, one pinnace, two yawls, and two dinghies, the last of which were later removed.

=== Machinery ===
An unidentified Bismarck-class corvette

The ships were powered by a single 3-cylinder marine steam engine that drove one 2-bladed screw propeller (Blücher had a three-bladed screw) that could be retracted while the ship was under sail. Steam was provided by four coal-fired fire-tube boilers, which were ducted into a single, funnel that could be retracted to reduce interference with the sailing rig. The ships had a top speed of 12.5 to 13.9 knots (23.2 to 25.7 km/h; 14.4 to 16.0 mph) at 2,334 to 2,989 metric horsepower (2,302 to 2,948 ihp). Coal storage amounted to 270 to 326 t (266 to 321 long tons). They had a cruising radius of 2,380 nautical miles (4,410 km; 2,740 mi) at a speed of 9 knots (17 km/h; 10 mph), though this fell to 1,940 nmi (3,590 km; 2,230 mi) at 10 knots (19 km/h; 12 mph).

At the time, the world's navies were grappling with the development of steam power, which had already replaced sails in large ironclad warships. Cruising vessels required a much longer radius of action than the ironclads, and steam engines were not yet reliable or efficient enough to rely on them alone, necessitating the retention of traditional sailing rigs. As built, the Bismarck-class ships were equipped with a full ship rig to supplement their steam engines on overseas cruising missions. The total sail area amounted to 2,200 m^{2} (24,000 sq ft). The ships' rig was later reduced, and Blücher had her rigging removed altogether shortly after entering service. Steering was controlled with a single rudder. The vessels were good sea boats, but they made bad leeway in even mild winds and they were difficult to maneuver. They lost a significant amount of speed in a head sea, and they had limited performance under sail.

=== Armament ===
The ships of the Bismarck class were armed with a battery of sixteen 15 cm (5.9 in) 22-caliber (cal.) breech-loading guns, though the number of guns on many of the ships varied throughout their careers. Blücher carried her main battery guns only briefly before she was converted into a training ship. In their original configuration, the ships carried fourteen of the guns in a broadside battery, seven guns per side. The remaining guns were placed on the upper deck and they could be moved between broadside and chase gun positions. The ships carried 1660 shells for the original complement of guns, though the allotment for those ships with fewer guns is not known. They also had two 8.8 cm (3.5 in) 30-cal. guns, though Blücher had four such guns. Bismarck was also equipped with a pair of 35 mm (1.4 in) torpedo tubes, both in her bow, above the waterline, though the rest of the class had no torpedo tubes.

Blücher was armed with a variety of torpedo tubes throughout her career, ranging in number from four to seven. These were all 35 cm (14 in) tubes, and they were placed in various positions in the ship, above and below the waterline. In addition, she was equipped with a pair of 8 cm (3.1 in) L/25 guns to be used for saluting purposes. Plans were made to add another pair of the guns and thirteen 3.7 cm (1.5 in) Hotchkiss revolver cannon in the event of a conflict, though this never occurred.

By 1890, all members of the class save Blücher had had their primary battery reduced to ten guns, and they had six of the 3.7 Hotchkiss guns installed. In the 1890s, the ships' armament diverged; Bismarck was unaltered, but the other cruising vessels received a pair of 8.8 cm (3.5 in) guns and four 6 cm (2.4 in) guns. Moltke had her original complement of 15 cm guns restored, while Gneisenau had her battery increased to fourteen guns and Stein was refitted with twelve of the 15 cm guns. In the early 1900s, the surviving ships had their weaponry significantly reduced to two 10.5 cm (4.1 in) guns, ten 8.8 cm guns, and the four 3.7 cm revolvers.

== Ships ==
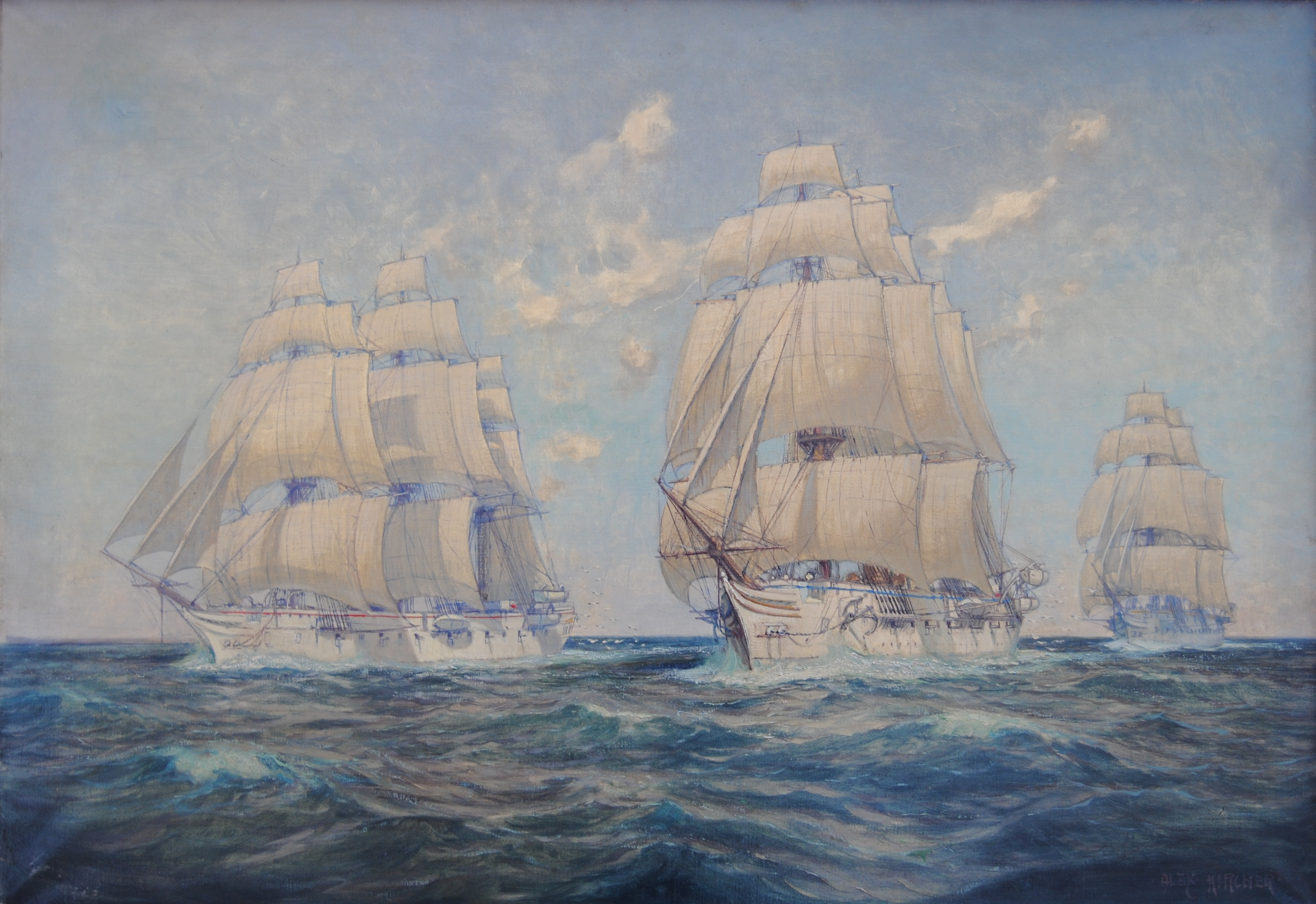
A painting of Stosch, Stein, and Gneisenau under sail, by Alexander Kircher

Construction data
Ship	Builder	Laid down	Launched	Completed
Bismarck	Norddeutsche Schiffbau AG, Kiel	November 1875	25 July 1877	27 August 1878
Blücher	Norddeutsche Schiffbau AG, Kiel	March 1876	20 March 1877	21 December 1878
Stosch	AG Vulcan, Stettin	November 1875	8 October 1877	10 March 1878
Moltke	Kaiserliche Werft, Danzig	July 1875	18 October 1877	16 April 1878
Gneisenau	Kaiserliche Werft, Danzig	June 1877	4 September 1879	3 October 1880
Stein	AG Vulcan, Stettin	1878	14 September 1879	3 October 1880

== Service history ==
=== Bismarck ===
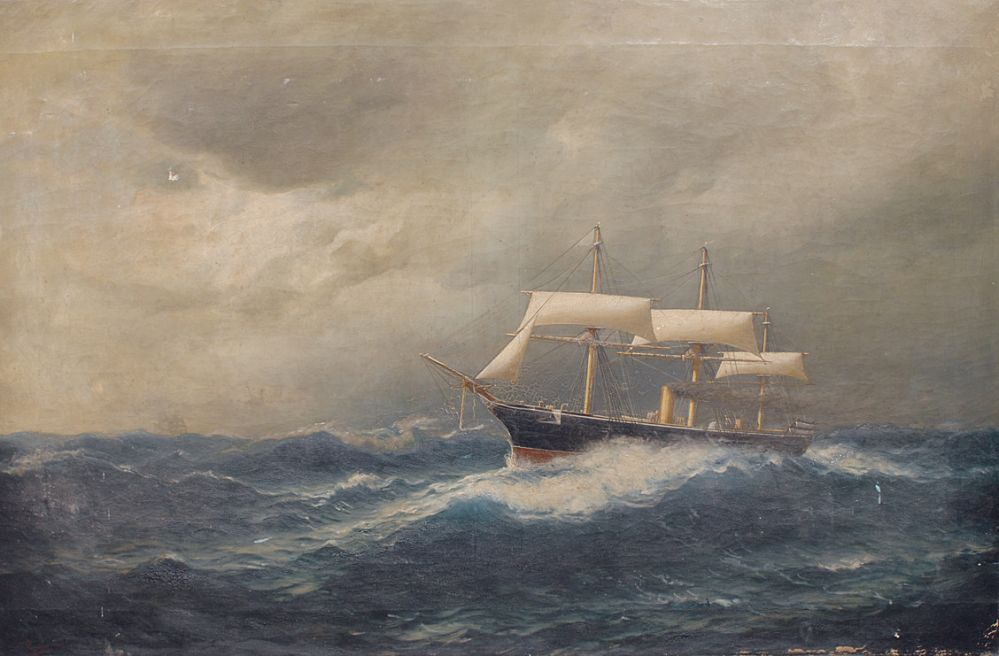
Painting of Bismarck in the Indian Ocean

Bismarck went on two major overseas cruises, the first in late 1878 to late 1880, which saw the ship visit South American ports and patrol the Central Pacific, where Germany had economic interests but no formal colonies at that time. During this cruise, her captain signed a friendship treaty with the ruler of the Society Islands, and she interfered with Samoan internal affairs before being recalled to Germany. Storm damage while on the way back forced her to seek repairs in Australia, and from there she was diverted to South American waters, where she protected German interests in the region during the War of the Pacific between Chile, Peru, and Bolivia. After returning to Germany, she was overhauled and received a new gun battery.

Bismarck was reactivated in 1883 as Germany prepared to embark on the scramble for Africa. The second deployment lasted from 1884 to 1888; during this period, Germany began to seize colonies in Africa and the Pacific; Bismarck was closely involved in the acquisition of Kamerun in 1884, sending men ashore to suppress revolts against German economic activities in the country. She was also involved in the settlement of borders for German East Africa in 1885 and 1886 and German intervention in the Samoan Civil War in 1887. For the entirety of this tour abroad, Bismarck served as the flagship of the German overseas cruiser squadron commanded by Eduard von Knorr and later Karl Eduard Heusner.

After returning to Germany in 1888, the ship was decommissioned and stricken from the naval register in 1891, which historians Hans Hildebrand, Albert Röhr, and Hans-Otto Steinmetz interpret as a deliberate insult to the ship's namesake, Otto von Bismarck, with whom Kaiser Wilhelm II had significant personal disagreements. Bismarck thereafter saw use as a barracks ship until 1920, when she was broken up.

=== Blücher ===
Blücher in heavy seas with torpedo boats

Blücher, named for Generalfeldmarschall (Field Marshal) Gebhard Leberecht von Blücher of the Napoleonic Wars, served as a torpedo training and testing ship in German waters for the entirety of her active career. This role was focused on two primary responsibilities, training crews in the operation of torpedoes and developing tactical employment of the weapons. To fulfill these tasks, the ship was heavily modified from her original configuration, having most of her guns removed in favor of a variety of torpedo weapons. Between the 1880s and early 1900s, most of the officers and crewmen in the German fleet received their torpedo training aboard the ship. By the early 1890s, the German torpedo-boat force had increased to the size that Blücher could no longer fill both roles, and so the task of developing tactics was given to the aviso Blitz. She was initially based in Kiel in the Baltic Sea, under the command of Alfred von Tirpitz, who at that time advocated for the use of small, cheap torpedo boats to defend Germany, rather than the expensive battleships he would later champion.

In the early 1900s, Blücher was transferred to the new Torpedo School in Flensburg-Mürwik, along with the old ironclad Württemberg, which supported her training role. Blücher had badly deteriorated by 1906, at which point she was reduced to a stationary training vessel. In 1907, Blücher suffered a boiler explosion that badly damaged the ship and killed thirty men, though most of her crew were ashore at the time of the accident. Deemed too old to warrant repairing, Blücher was instead sold to a Dutch company that used her as a coal storage hulk in Vigo, Spain; her ultimate fate is unknown.

=== Stosch ===
An unidentified member of the class, likely in the 1890s

Stosch embarked on a major overseas cruise from 1881 to 1885, first as the flagship of the East Asia Squadron and later as the flagship of the East and West Africa Squadrons. Most of this deployment was spent in East Asian waters, where she was involved with mediating disputes over Germany's growing colonial empire in the Pacific Ocean and securing trade agreements with foreign governments. In early 1885, she was transferred to the East Africa Squadron, where she also served as the flagship. While in East African waters, Carl Heinrich Theodor Paschen took Stosch to Zanzibar, where he negotiated a settlement with the Sultan of Zanzibar, paving the way for the founding of German East Africa. Stosch's stint lasted just six months, when she was transferred again, briefly, to the West African Squadron. The presence of the squadron proved to be unnecessary, and so the ships were recalled to Germany in December 1885, where the squadron was disbanded.

Beginning in early 1886, Stosch underwent an extensive modernization in preparation for her service as a training ship for naval cadets and later Schiffsjungen. The ship served in this capacity from 1888 to 1907, during which time her activity consisted primarily of fleet training exercises and overseas training cruises. These cruises frequently went to the West Indies and Mediterranean Sea, though she also made visits to South America and West Africa. Stosch also frequently visited foreign ports to show the flag. She also engaged in settling disputes involving foreign governments, including over the murder of a pair of German citizens in Morocco in 1895 and during the Venezuelan crisis of 1902–1903. After being decommissioned in April 1907, she was briefly used as a hulk in Kiel before being sold for scrap in October that year.

=== Moltke ===
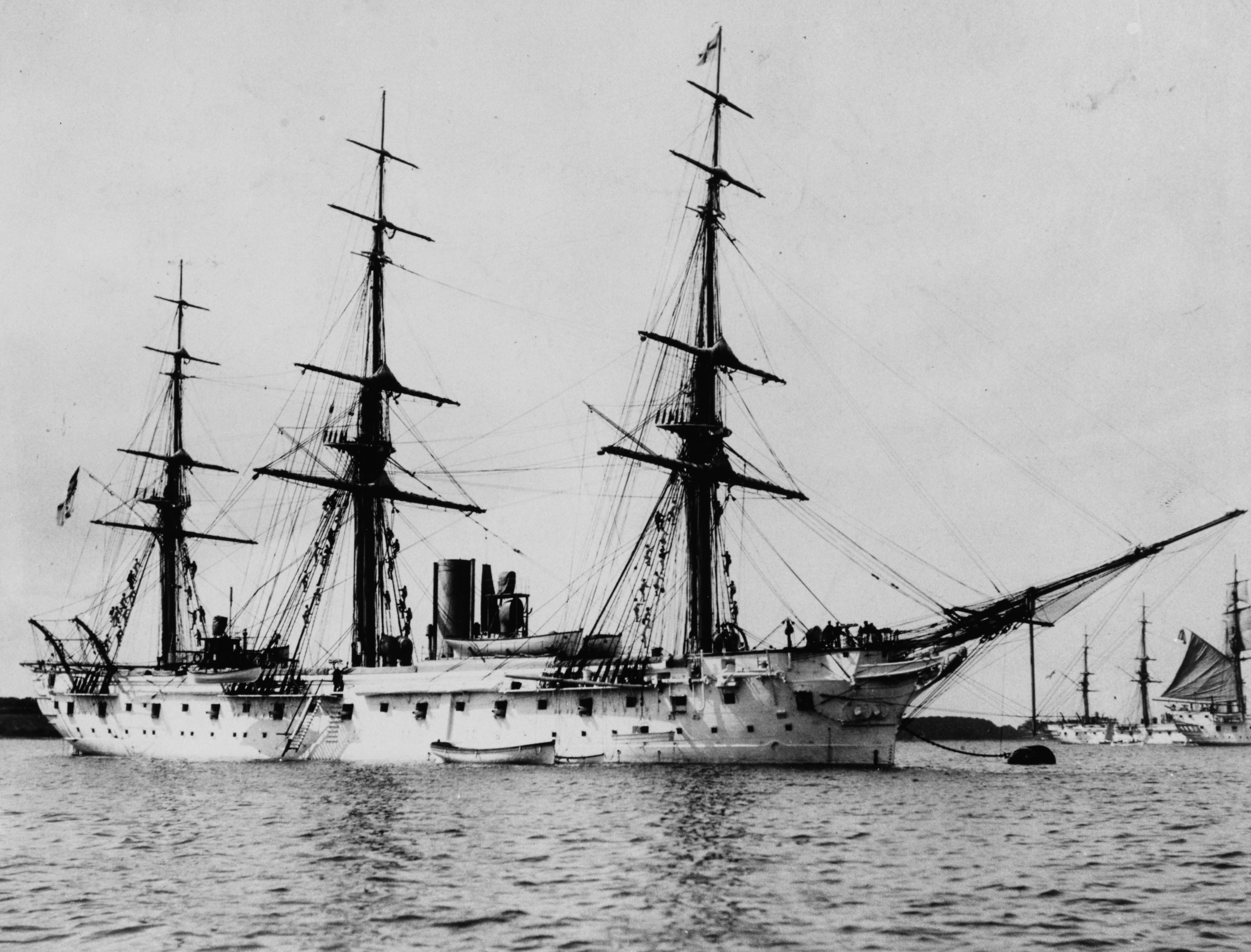
Moltke in 1898 in Kiel

Moltke was the first ship of the class to be laid down, but unlike most of her sisters, Moltke was built at one of the government yards, which at that time typically were much slower than private yards, and as a result, she was completed much later. The ship went on one major overseas deployment to South America between 1881 and 1883. She spent the last half of 1881 visiting ports in several South American countries during the War of the Pacific to protect German interests against civil disturbances in the conflict. She carried the German expedition for the International Polar Year to South Georgia Island; the area she landed the expedition in Royal Bay is known as Moltke Harbor in honor of the ship. She returned to the western coast of South America in 1882 and continued her tour of the region before being recalled to Germany in mid-1883.

After returning to Germany in 1885, she became a training ship for naval cadets and later Schiffsjungen. The ship served in this capacity from 1885 to 1908, during which time her activity consisted primarily of fleet training exercises and overseas training cruises; like Stosch, Moltke was used to show the flag and protect German interest on these trips. These cruises frequently went to the West Indies and Mediterranean Sea, but ranged as far north as Iceland and as far south as Argentina. She was stricken from the naval register in October 1910, converted into a barracks ship, and assigned to the U-boat school in Kiel. In October 1911, Moltke was renamed Acheron and she served in this capacity until 1920, when she was sold to ship breakers in July and subsequently dismantled for scrap.

=== Gneisenau ===
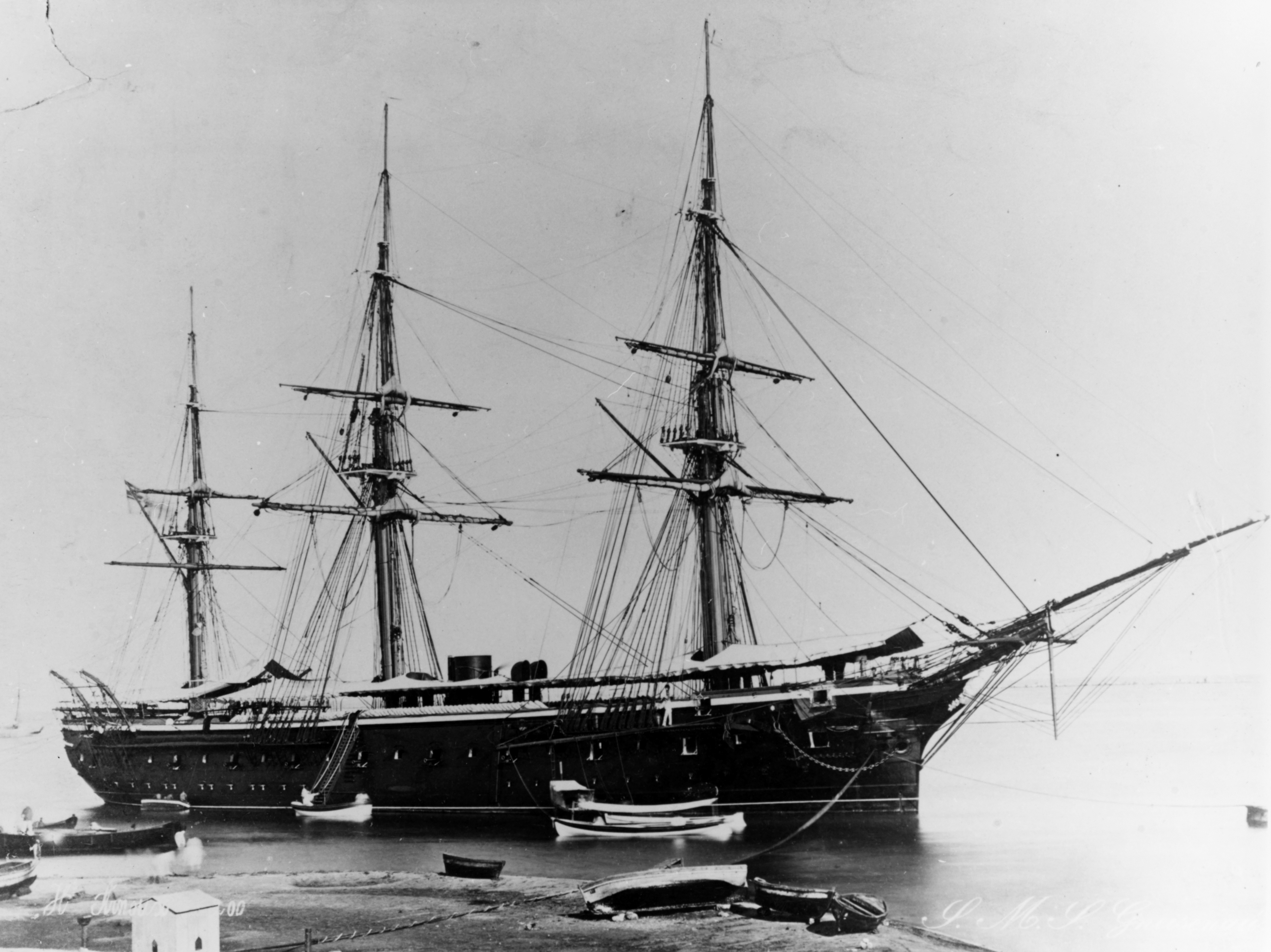
Gneisenau in port, likely in the 1880s

Gneisenau went abroad on two major foreign deployments in the first decade of her career. The first, in 1882, was to protect German nationals in Egypt during the 'Urabi revolt, though by the time she arrived, British forces had largely defeated the rebels, allowing Gneisenau to return home without having to take action in the conflict. The second, lengthier deployment came two years later and lasted from 1884 to 1886. The cruise was primarily focused on German colonial designs on eastern Africa as Germany joined the Scramble for Africa. Gneisenau was involved in the establishment of the colony of German East Africa in 1885, particularly as part of a show of force to convince the Sultan of Zanzibar to drop his objection to a German protectorate in Wituland. She also briefly toured German interests in the Pacific Ocean in 1886.

In 1887, Gneisenau began her service as a training ship, a role she held for more than a decade. During this period, she was generally occupied with training cruises and individual, squadron, and fleet training. Long-distance cruises frequently alternated between the West Indies and the Mediterranean Sea. During fleet maneuvers in 1895, Gneisenau accidentally collided with a Danish schooner, sinking the schooner and killing most of her crew. While on a training cruise, she stopped outside Málaga to conduct gunnery training on 16 December 1900. A strong storm surprised the crew, who, through a communication problem between the commander and engine room crew, raised anchor and tried to get the vessel underway. They were unable to get sufficient steam up in the boilers before she was driven into the mole by heavy winds and destroyed. Most of her crew survived, but 41 officers and men were killed in the sinking, including her commanding officer. Her wreck proved impossible to salvage, and so she was sold for scrap shortly after the accident.

=== Stein ===
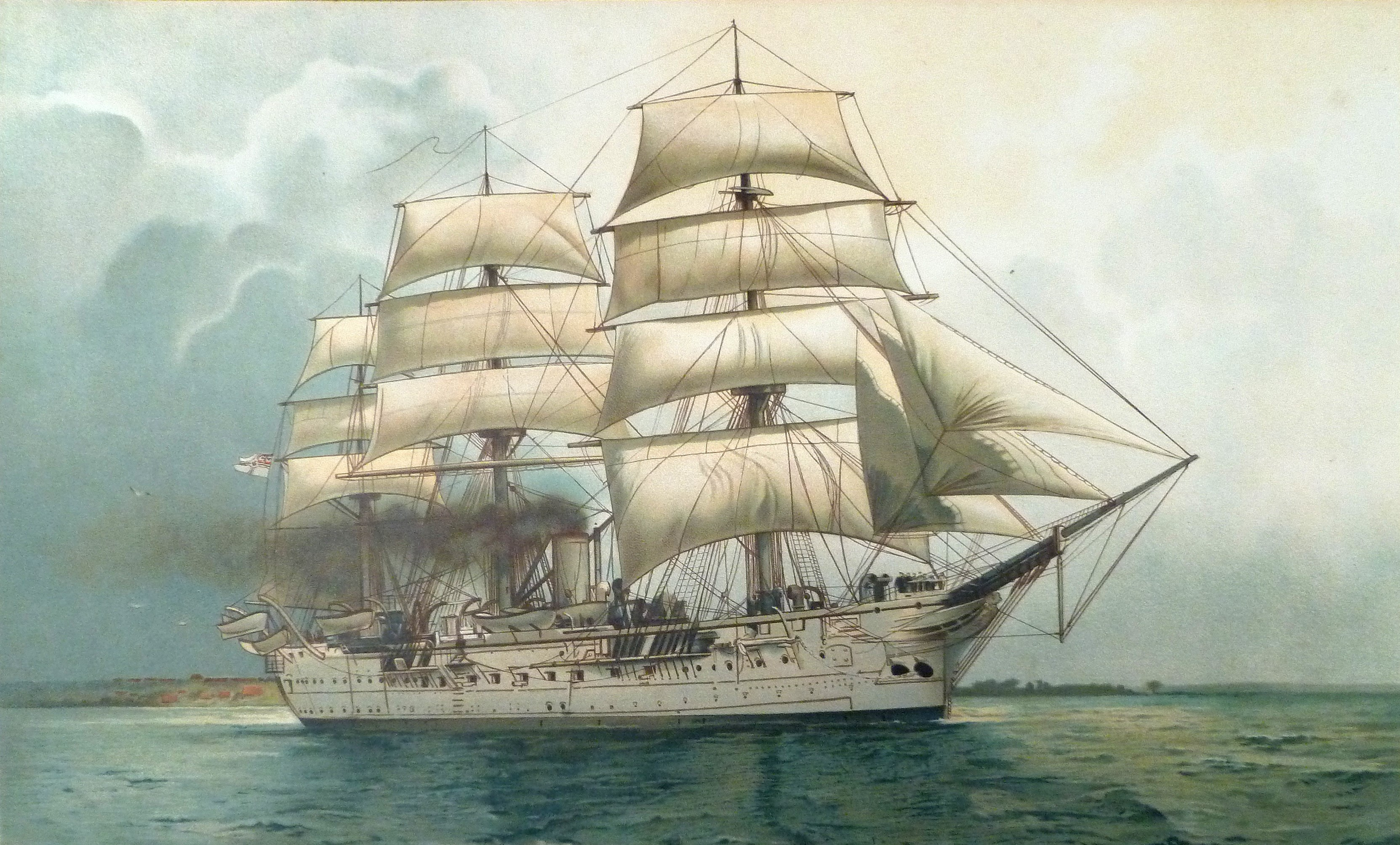
Stein in service as a training ship

Stein served almost her entire career as a training ship. As such, her career was much more limited than most of her sisters; with the exception of Blücher, all of the other Bismarck-class corvettes had at least one full deployment abroad. Stein's only non-training task came early in her career when she carried a replacement crew to Chinese waters for her sister Stosch in 1883–1884. The rest of her time in service was spent training naval cadets and Schiffsjungen and participating in squadron and fleet training exercises. Her training duties frequently involved long-distance overseas cruises, typically either to the Mediterranean Sea or the West Indies and South America. On these cruises, Stein and other training ships visited foreign ports and responded to problems that arose involving German nationals abroad. She served in this role from 1885 to 1908; during this period, in 1888 she was modernized and converted into a dedicated training ship. Stein frequently served as the flagship of the Training Squadron. In 1908, she was stricken from the naval register and converted into a barracks ship. She continued on in this limited capacity through World War I, before being broken up in 1920.
