= SMS Stosch =

Screw corvette of the German Imperial Navy

- Stosch in 1894

History

German Empire
- Name: SMS Stosch
- Namesake: Admiral Albrecht von Stosch
- Builder: Vulcan AG, Stettin
- Laid down: November 1875
- Launched: 8 October 1876
- Commissioned: 25 June 1879
- Decommissioned: 3 April 1907
- Stricken: 27 May 1907
- Fate: Sold for scrap, October 1907

General characteristics
- Class & type: Bismarck-class corvette
- Displacement: Full load: 2,994 t (2,947 long tons)
- Length: 82 m (269 ft)
- Beam: 13.7 m (44 ft 11 in)
- Draft: 5.2 m (17 ft 1 in)
- Installed power: 2,500 ihp (1,900 kW); 4 × fire-tube boilers
- Propulsion: 1 × screw propeller; 1 × marine steam engine
- Speed: 12 knots (22 km/h; 14 mph)
- Range: 2,380 nmi (4,410 km; 2,740 mi) at 9 knots (17 km/h; 10 mph)
- Complement: 404
- Armament: 10 × 15 cm (5.9 in) guns; 2 × 88 mm (3.5 in) quick-firing guns; 6 × 37 mm (1.5 in) 5-barreled guns

SMS Stosch was a Bismarck-class corvette built for the German Imperial Navy (Kaiserliche Marine) in the late 1870s. The ship was named for Admiral Albrecht von Stosch, the first chief of staff (from 1872 to 1883) of the newly created Imperial Navy. She was the third member of the class, which included five other vessels. The Bismarck-class corvettes were ordered as part of a major naval construction program in the early 1870s, and she was designed to serve as a fleet scout and on extended tours in Germany's colonial empire. Stosch was laid down in November 1875, launched in October 1876, and was commissioned into the fleet in June 1879. She was armed with a battery of ten 15 cm (5.9 in) guns and had a full ship rig to supplement her steam engine on long cruises abroad.

Stosch embarked on a major overseas cruise in the 1880s, first as the flagship of the East Asia Squadron from 1881 to 1885. In early 1885, she was transferred to the East Africa Squadron, where she also served as the flagship, though this stint lasted just six months, when she was transferred again, briefly, to the West African Squadron, before returning to Germany in late 1885. During these four years abroad, she was involved with mediating disputes over Germany's growing colonial empire in the Pacific Ocean and in Africa. Beginning in early 1886, Stosch underwent an extensive modernization in preparation for her service as a training ship for naval cadets and later apprentice seamen.

The ship served in this capacity from 1888 to 1907, during which time her activity consisted primarily of fleet training exercises and overseas training cruises. These cruises frequently went to the West Indies and Mediterranean Sea, though she also made visits to South America and West Africa. She also engaged in settling disputes involving foreign governments, including over the murder of a pair of German citizens in Morocco in 1895 and during the Venezuelan crisis of 1902–1903. After being decommissioned in April 1907, she was briefly used as a hulk in Kiel before being sold for scrap in October that year.

== Design ==
An unidentified Bismarck-class corvette

The six ships of the Bismarck class were ordered in the early 1870s to supplement Germany's fleet of cruising warships, which at that time relied on several ships that were twenty years old. Stosch and her sister ships were intended to patrol Germany's colonial empire and safeguard German economic interests around the world. They were designed as a smaller and more economical version of the preceding Leipzig-class corvettes.

Stosch was 82 meters (269 ft) long overall, with a beam of 13.7 m (44 ft 11 in) and a draft of 5.2 m (17 ft 1 in) forward. She displaced 2,994 metric tons (2,947 long tons) at full load. The ship's crew consisted of 18 officers and 386 enlisted men. Her hull had a straight stem and was sheathed with zinc to prevent marine biofouling on long voyages abroad.

She was powered by a single marine steam engine that drove one 2-bladed screw propeller, with steam provided by four coal-fired fire-tube boilers, which was vented through a single, retractable funnel. Her propulsion system gave her a top speed of 12.6 knots (23.3 km/h; 14.5 mph) at 2,419 metric horsepower (2,386 ihp). She had a cruising radius of 2,380 nautical miles (4,410 km; 2,740 mi) at a speed of 9 knots (17 km/h; 10 mph). As built, Stosch was equipped with a full ship rig, but this was later reduced.

Stosch was armed with a battery of sixteen 15 cm (5.9 in) 22-caliber (cal.) breech-loading guns and four 8 cm (3.1 in) 25-cal. guns. Her armament was revised several times during her career; by 1890, the number of 15 cm guns had been reduced to ten. She also had six 3.7 cm (1.5 in) Hotchkiss revolver cannon installed for close-range defense against torpedo boats. During another refit in the 1890s, a pair of 8.8 cm (3.5 in) guns were added, along with four 6 cm (2.4 in) guns. In the early 1900s, she was rearmed with a pair of 10.5 cm (4.1 in) guns, ten 8.8 cm guns, and four 3.7 cm guns.

== Service history ==
The keel for Stosch, ordered under the contract name "Ersatz Gazelle", (Note: German warships were ordered under provisional names. Additions to the fleet were given a single letter; ships intended to replace older or lost vessels were ordered as "Ersatz (name of the ship to be replaced)".) was laid down in November 1875 at the AG Vulcan shipyard in Stettin. She was the third member of the Bismarck class, and she was launched on 8 October 1876. At the launching ceremony, she was christened Stosch after Admiral Albrecht von Stosch by Konteradmiral (KAdm—Rear Admiral) Reinhold von Werner, the Chief of the Marinestation der Ostsee (Naval Station of the Baltic Sea). By the end of November, she was seaworthy enough to be transferred to Swinemünde and then to Wilhelmshaven by a shipyard crew, where fitting out work was completed, including the installation of her guns. Stosch began sea trials on 25 June 1879, which lasted until 11 August. After completing the tests, she was decommissioned and placed in reserve.

=== Overseas deployment ===
==== East Asia Squadron ====
Stosch was reactivated on 1 April 1881 for a deployment to the Far East under the command of Kapitän zur See (KzS—Captain at Sea) Louis von Blanc, where she was to serve as the flagship of the overseas cruiser squadron in the region. At the time, Stosch, who was the head of the Kaiserliche Admiralität (Imperial Admiralty), had implemented a plan whereby Germany's colonies would be protected by gunboats, while larger warships would generally be kept in reserve, with a handful assigned to a flying squadron that could respond to crises quickly. Stosch left Germany on 15 April, rounded the Cape of Good Hope, and reached Batavia in the Dutch East Indies on 18 July, where she met the previous flagship of the squadron, the corvette Freya. Stosch then proceeded to Chefoo, where she met the rest of the squadron, which consisted of the screw frigate Hertha and the gunboats Iltis and Wolf. Blanc also became Kommodore (Commodore) of the cruiser squadron. The ships conducted squadron training exercises, and then Stosch visited Japanese harbors by herself and then went to Hong Kong.

The Admiralität had determined that the responsibilities of squadron commander and ship captain were too much of a burden for one individual, and so Stosch ordered that squadron flagships should have new captains sent; KzS Glomsda von Bucholz arrived aboard the ship on 8 January 1882 to serve as the new captain. Stosch then began a cruise in the South China and Sulu Seas; this voyage also included a stop at the island of Jolo, where Blanc negotiated a trade agreement with the sultan of the Sulu Islands, Badarud-Din II. The squadron assembled in Chefoo in mid-June, and on 16 June, Stosch and Wolf sailed to Chemulpo with a diplomatic delegation to negotiate a trade treaty with Korea, then under the Joseon dynasty. Stosch then returned to Chefoo before proceeding to Hakodate, Japan, where she met the corvette Elisabeth, which had recently arrived to replace Hertha. On 25 September, Stosch and Wolf began an exploration of the Hai River while they were carrying the diplomat Max von Brandt on the way to Tianjin, from which he was to travel overland to Beijing.

On 6 March 1883, Stosch, which had sailed south to Amoy, began a cruise in the East Asian region, at times in company with other members of the squadron. In June, the corvette Leipzig arrived to replace Elisabeth. The squadron met in the Wusong roadstead on 19 August in response to anti-European unrest in the area, owing to China's conflicts with France over Tonkin and Annam that led to the Sino-French War. While here, KAdm Max von der Goltz arrived on 26 August to relieve now-KAdm Blanc. Stosch went to Hong Kong in June for an overhaul that lasted five months; with the completion of the work on 4 November, she exchanged crews with her sister ship Stein, which had been sent with a replacement crew. Stosch then began another cruise in the region. On 4 March 1884, KzS Carl Heinrich Theodor Paschen arrived to relieve Goltz, and a week later Leipzig began the voyage home, being replaced by the corvette Prinz Adalbert, which arrived in mid-May.

The German squadron, along with other foreign warships, remained anchored in Shanghai as a precaution against unrest in the city. The Austro-Hungarian gunboat Albatross was temporarily assigned to Paschen's command during this period. Stosch went to Japan to rest her crew, but renewed violence in Shanghai forced her return, along with Prinz Adalbert and Wolf to protect German nationals in the city. On 16 September, Prinz Adalbert was detached to South American waters, leaving only Wolf and the gunboat Nautilus in the squadron with Stosch. In January 1885, Stosch had to return to Chemulpo in response to disturbances in the city. She did not remain there long; in February, she received orders to sail to East African waters to serve as flagship of a new cruiser squadron being formed there. The East Asia Squadron was accordingly disbanded, since there were just the two gunboats remaining on the station.

==== East Africa Squadron ====
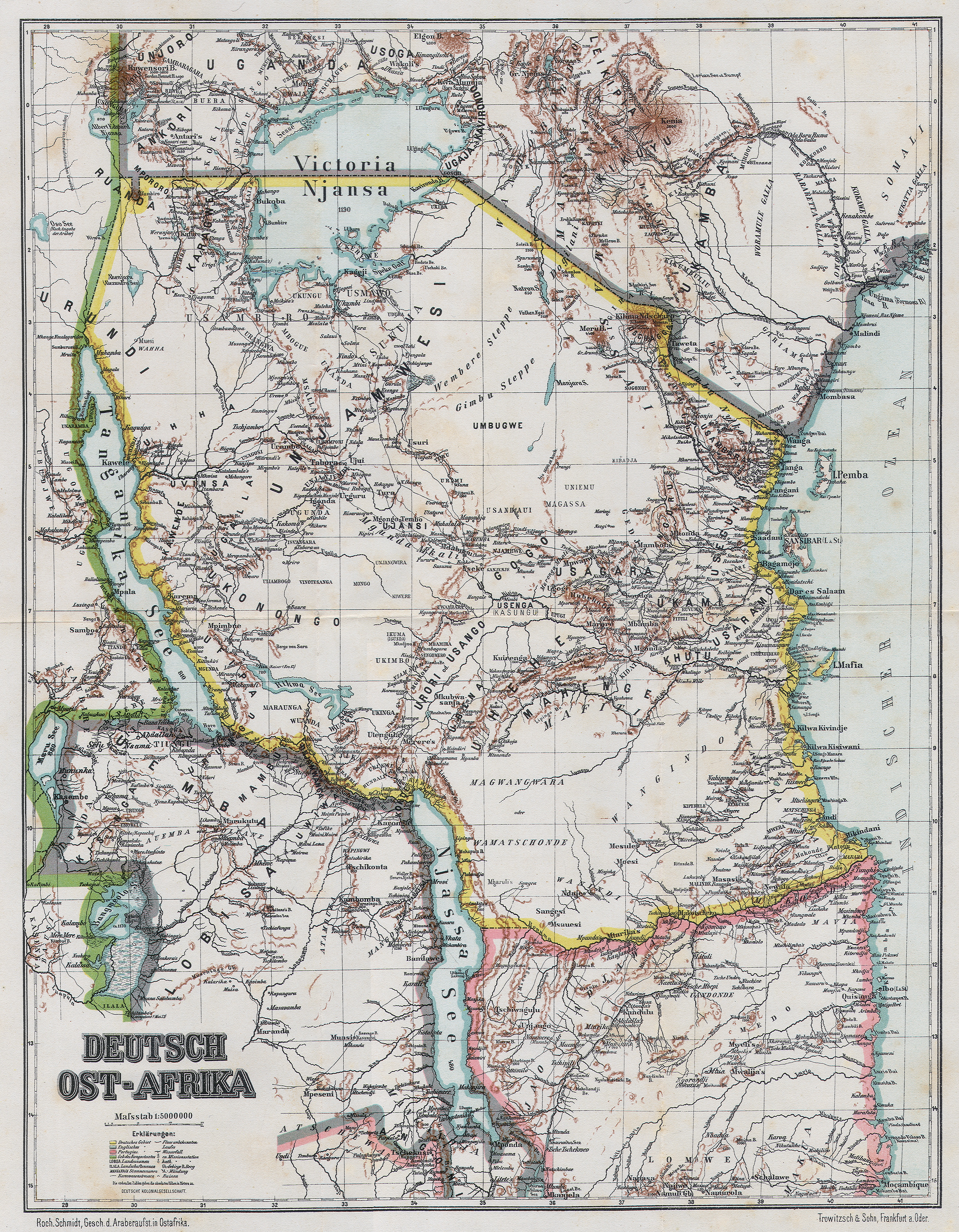
Contemporary map of German East Africa

On 1 March 1885, Stosch departed Chemulpo for Hong Kong, where she received amended orders instructing her to first stop in Australia to help mediate disputes between Germany and Great Britain over the German acquisition of colonies in the Bismarck Archipelago and Kaiser-Wilhelmsland and defend the claims by force if necessary. She arrived in Sydney on 11 April, where she received news of the accidental grounding of the corvette Marie off Neu-Mecklenburg, and so Stosch went to tow her back to Sydney for repairs. By the time Stosch and Marie had arrived in Sydney on 6 May, the political situation had calmed, allowing Stosch to return to her original assignment, departing Australia in mid-June and arriving in Port Louis in Mauritius on 5 July, where she waited for other members of the new squadron to arrive. Within the span of a few days, her sister ship Gneisenau, Elisabeth, Prinz Adalbert and the chartered steamship SS Ehrenfels arrived. The first operation the new squadron embarked upon was a search for the corvette Augusta, which had disappeared in the Gulf of Aden. The search began around the Maldives and the Chagos Archipelago, but the ships were unable to locate the missing vessel.

By this time, Germany had entered the Scramble for Africa, establishing protectorates in Southwest Africa, Kamerun, and Togoland. On 7 July, the squadron left Port Louis, bound for Zanzibar. While en route, Stosch's commander, KzS von Nostitz, had a heart attack and died; Prinz Adalbert's first officer, Korvettenkapitän (Corvette Captain) Geissler temporarily served as Stosch's captain until Nostitz's replacement, KzS Otto von Diederichs arrived on 8 September. In the meantime, the squadron anchored off Zanzibar on 7 August, surprising the sultan of Zanzibar Barghash bin Said, who disputed Germany's most recent colonial acquisition, the protectorate of Wituland, which formed the nucleus of what was to become German East Africa. Paschen and Consul General Travers negotiated on the basis of three German demands: that bin Said recognize the German protectorate in Wituland, conclude a separate trade and friendship treaty, and name his nephew, the son of his sister Emily Ruete, as his successor. Bin Said agreed to the first two terms, but the third was deferred for the time being.

On 17 August, Stosch's sister ship Bismarck arrived in Zanzibar with the new squadron chief, KAdm Eduard von Knorr. At the same time, Paschen was ordered to form a new squadron, based on Stosch, Prinz Adalbert, and Gneisenau, to support the colonies in West Africa. Stosch went to Cape Town on 11 October for maintenance, and while she was out of service for repairs, Paschen, who was now promoted to Konteradmiral, temporarily transferred his flag to Prinz Adalbert. On 21 November, Stosch went to Freetown, where Paschen came back aboard the ship for the return of Stosch and Prinz Adalbert to Germany, Gneisenau having already returned to the East African Squadron. The Admiralität dissolved the squadron on 21 December and ten days later, Stosch was decommissioned for extensive modernization that included installing new boilers and replacing the old 15 cm guns with new quick-firing models. The ship was then placed in reserve, assigned to the list of training ships.

=== Training ship ===
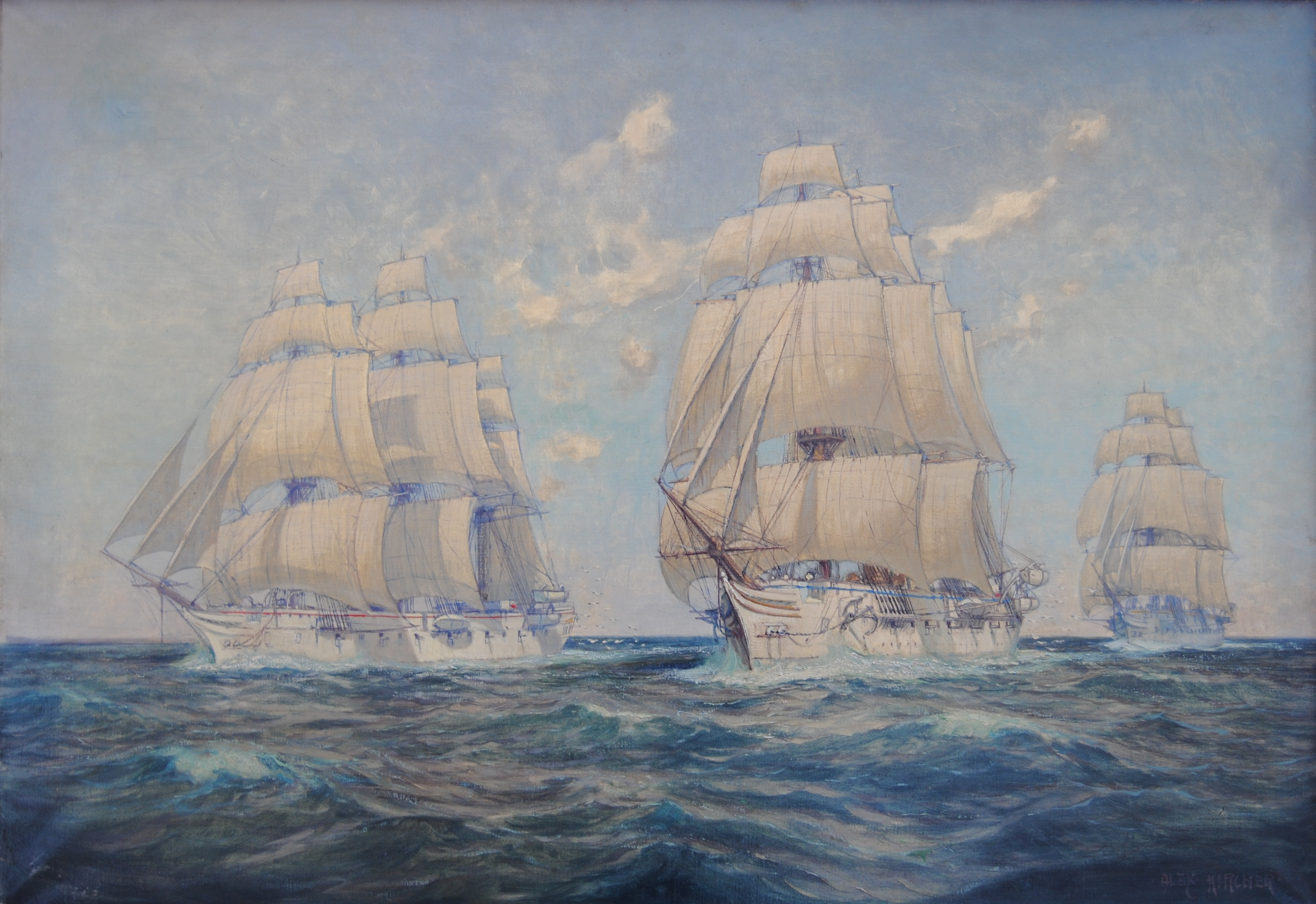
A painting of Stosch, Stein, and Gneisenau under sail, by Alexander Kircher

=== 1888–1896 ===
Stosch was recommissioned on 20 September 1888 to serve as the flagship of the school squadron, replacing Stein in that role. At the time, the squadron was commanded by KAdm Friedrich von Hollmann, and it included Gneisenau, their sister Moltke, and the corvette Charlotte. The ships left for an overseas training cruise shortly thereafter, entering the Mediterranean Sea on 29 September. The ships visited ports throughout the Mediterranean individually and as a squadron, and they participated in celebrations commemorating the 25th anniversary of King George I of Greece from 27 October to 5 November in Piraeus. While Stosch was in Smyrna, Hollmann and his staff made an official visit to Sultan Abdul Hamid II of the Ottoman Empire. On 24 February 1889, Hollmann received orders to take the squadron to Egypt, where they were to replace the East Africa Squadron, which was in turn being sent to Samoa, but by the time Stosch and the rest of the squadron arrived in Alexandria, the reassignment of the East Africa Squadron had become unnecessary, and so on 20 March, the school squadron was recalled. While the ships were in Palermo, Sicily, the Admiralität again reconsidered deploying the ships after the 1889 Apia cyclone sank two German gunboats in Samoa, but again decided against deploying the ships. The squadron arrived back in Wilhelmshaven on 16 April, where the squadron was dissolved and Stosch was decommissioned on 27 April.

In 1891, Stosch was reactivated for use as a guard ship in Kiel. She went to the Cowes Regatta and then visited Leith, Scotland and Bergen, Norway before returning to Kiel on 5 August. She went on a cruise in the western Baltic and she participated in the annual fleet training exercises that began on 28 August. After the conclusion of the maneuvers, she was again decommissioned in Kiel on 24 September. She spent the following year in a similar manner, and in 1893 she added a major overseas cruise to train naval cadets. She took part in the annual maneuvers as part of III Division that year. After the maneuvers, she underwent an overhaul before embarking on another major cruise to the West Indies on 8 October. Stosch arrived back in Kiel on 29 March 1894, and again served with III Division during the fleet exercises that year. Another cruise to the West Indies began on 13 October and ended on 26 March 1895 in Kiel. That year, she began training Schiffsjungen (apprentice seamen) in addition to cadets, initially in German waters. She took part in the ceremony for the opening of the Kaiser Wilhelm Canal in June.

Stosh's training duties were interrupted on 29 June when she was sent along with the coastal defense ship Hagen, the protected cruiser Kaiserin Augusta, and Marie to Morocco in response to the murder of two German citizens in the country. The ships arrived on 10 July, where they sought to secure compensation for the murders, which was accomplished by 4 August, allowing the ships to return to Germany. Stosch arrived in Wilhelmshaven on 13 August, in time for the fleet exercises that year. The typical overseas cruise began on 2 October, and again went to the West Indies. Stosch stayed in Port-au-Prince, Haiti from 20 to 23 December in response to unrest that threatened Germans in the city. In mid-January 1896, Stosch went to Key West before joining Stein and Gneisenau in Havana, Cuba; the three ships then proceeded to Venezuela. The training ships then began the voyage back to Germany; while on the way back, they stopped in Rotterdam, where they were received by Queen Emma. The ships arrived back in Kiel on 18 March. From 8 to 11 July, Stosch and Stein visited St. Petersburg.

=== 1896–1907 ===
An unidentified member of the class, likely in the 1890s

Stosch took part in the fleet maneuvers in III Division again in 1896, after which she embarked on the winter training cruise on 26 September, which went to the Mediterranean that year. She spent much of the time on the cruise visiting ports in the Levant, and arrived back in Germany on 25 March 1897. After completing a complete overhaul, she returned to service on 5 April 1898 for the normal routine of training exercises, including the fleet maneuvers in August and September. The winter cruise went to both the West Indies and the Mediterranean; while she was in Tangiers, she and Charlotte placed pressure on the Moroccan government to pay the compensation for the two murders in 1895. The ships reached Germany on 22 March 1899, and by this time, the navy had altered the training schedule. Instead of conducting the overseas cruise over the winter months, the cruise was to take place over the summer, so after a short period of training in the Baltic, Stosch began 1899's cruise on 2 July. She returned to Germany on 12 March 1900, which was followed by visits to Norwegian, British, and Dutch ports between 11 August and 20 September. Cruises to the Mediterranean followed from 20 September 1900 to 18 March 1901 and from 1 August 1901 to 19 March 1902.

The ship's next cruise began with exercises in the Baltic from 6 June to 29 July, followed by visits to Copenhagen, Denmark and Oslo, Norway. She then proceeded into the Atlantic, stopping in Vigo, Spain, after which she sailed to the West indies. On arriving in Venezuela on 25 November, she joined the East American Cruiser Division, the flagship of which was the protected cruiser Vineta. She was present during the Venezuelan crisis of 1902–1903, though her role in the crisis was limited to taking the German ambassador from La Guaira to Curaçao. On 29 January 1903, Stosch was detached from the squadron and she arrived back in Kiel on 20 March. On 19 May, Stosch began a cruise in the Baltic and North Seas that included stops in Libau, Russia and Bergen. Afterward, she began a cruise to South American waters, as far south as Bahía Blanca, Brazil, and returned to Germany on 16 March 1904. She began another cruise to the Mediterranean on 16 July, stopping first in Stockholm, Sweden and Bergen, where Kaiser Wilhelm II visited the ship. From Bergen, she sailed to Cueta and then to Constantinople, where her commander made an official visit to Abdul Hamid II. She arrived back in Kiel on 18 March 1905.

On 18 July, Stosch embarked on another cruise, this time to West African waters. She went to Cape Blanco, where she conducted hydrographic surveys, during which she accidentally ran aground and had to be towed free by a British steamship. She went to Cueta on 23 October for repairs, which were completed on 20 January 1906, allowing her to continue on her cruise in the Mediterranean. Stosch arrived back in Kiel on 17 March, and the training cycle for the year began on 31 March. She went on another cruise to the Mediterranean that concluded on 16 March 1907. She was decommissioned in Kiel on 3 April and stricken from the naval register on 27 May. She was briefly used as a hulk at the Kaiserliche Werft (Imperial Shipyard) in Kiel, though she was sold in October to a Dutch ship breaking firm and scrapped.
