= SMS Blücher (1877) =

Screw corvette of the German Imperial Navy

- Blücher in heavy seas with a torpedo boat

History

German Empire
- Name: SMS Blücher
- Namesake: Field Marshal Gebhard von Blücher
- Builder: Norddeutsche Schiffbau, Kiel
- Laid down: March 1876
- Launched: 20 September 1877
- Commissioned: 1878
- Fate: Sold 1909

General characteristics
- Class & type: Bismarck-class corvette
- Displacement: Full load: 2,890 t (2,844 long tons)
- Length: 82.5 m (270 ft 8 in)
- Beam: 13.7 m (44 ft 11 in)
- Draft: 6.18 m (20 ft 3 in)
- Installed power: 2,989 metric horsepower (2,948 ihp); 4 × fire-tube boilers
- Propulsion: 1 × screw propeller; 1 × marine steam engine
- Speed: 12 knots (22 km/h; 14 mph)
- Range: 2,380 nmi (4,410 km; 2,740 mi) at 9 knots (17 km/h; 10 mph)
- Complement: 404
- Armament: 4–7 × 35 cm (13.8 in) torpedo tubes

SMS Blücher was a Bismarck-class corvette built for the German Kaiserliche Marine (Imperial Navy) in the late 1870s. The Bismarck-class corvettes were ordered as part of a major naval construction program in the early 1870s, and she was designed to serve as a fleet scout and on extended tours in Germany's colonial empire. Blücher was laid down in March 1876, launched in September 1877, and was commissioned into the fleet in late 1878. Unlike her sister ships, Blücher was converted shortly after entering service into a torpedo training ship to experiment with the new self-propelled torpedoes and develop German torpedo doctrine.

Blücher served in this capacity for the entirety of her active career. She was initially based in Kiel in the Baltic Sea, under the command of Alfred von Tirpitz. Between the 1880s and early 1900s, most of the officers and crewmen in the German fleet received their torpedo training aboard the ship. In 1907, Blücher suffered a boiler explosion that badly damaged the ship and killed thirty men. Deemed too old to warrant repairing, Blücher was instead sold to a Dutch company that used her as a coal storage hulk; her ultimate fate is unknown.

== Design ==
The six ships of the Bismarck class were ordered in the early 1870s to supplement Germany's fleet of cruising warships, which at that time relied on several ships that were twenty years old. The ships were intended to patrol Germany's colonial empire and safeguard German economic interests around the world, though Blücher spent much of her career as a torpedo training ship in German waters. They were designed as a smaller and more economical version of the preceding Leipzig-class corvettes.

Blücher was 82.5 meters (270 ft 8 in) long overall, with a beam of 13.7 m (44 ft 11 in) and a draft of 5.68 m (18 ft 8 in) forward. She displaced 2,890 metric tons (2,840 long tons) at full load. The ship's crew consisted of 18 officers and 386 enlisted men. Her hull had a straight stem and was sheathed with zinc to prevent marine biofouling during lengthy periods at sea.

She was powered by a single marine steam engine that drove one 2-bladed screw propeller, with steam provided by four coal-fired fire-tube boilers, which was vented through a single, retractable funnel. Her propulsion system gave her a top speed of 13.9 knots (25.7 km/h; 16.0 mph) at 2,989 metric horsepower (2,948 ihp). She had a cruising radius of 2,380 nautical miles (4,410 km; 2,740 mi) at a speed of 9 knots (17 km/h; 10 mph). As built, Blücher was equipped with a full ship rig, but this was later reduced.

Blücher was armed with a variety of torpedo tubes throughout her career, ranging in number from four to seven. These were all 35 cm (13.8 in) tubes, and they were placed in various positions in the ship, above and below the waterline. Her gun armament consisted of four 8 cm (3.1 in) 25-cal. breech-loading guns and up to thirteen 37 mm (1.5 in) Hotchkiss revolver cannon.

== Service history ==
=== Construction through 1890 ===
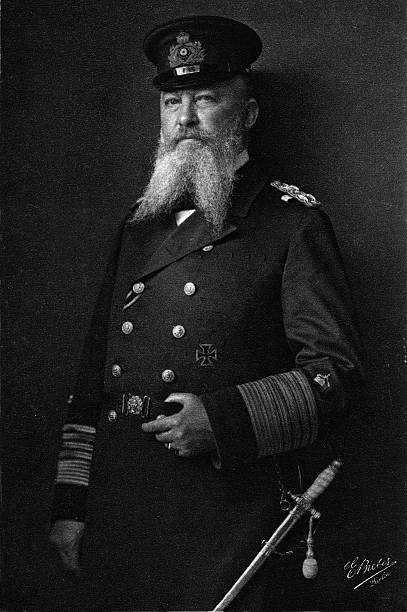
Alfred von Tirpitz, the ship's first commander

Blücher was laid down in March 1876 under the contract name "C", (Note: German warships were ordered under provisional names. Additions to the fleet were given a single letter; ships intended to replace older or lost vessels were ordered as "Ersatz (name of the ship to be replaced)".) and she was launched on 20 September 1877. The Chief of the Marinestation der Ostsee (Baltic Sea Naval Station), Konteradmiral (Rear Admiral) Reinhold von Werner christened the ship at her launching after Gebhard Leberecht von Blücher, the famous Prussian Army commander during the Napoleonic Wars. In late 1878, the ship was ready to begin sea trials, which lasted until 30 January 1879. On entering service, Blücher was assigned to torpedo testing duties; the navy planned to use the ship as a support ship for torpedo boats in the event of a war. By early 1880, the ship had been converted for this use; her original intended armament was removed and replaced with a variety of torpedo tubes, and her sailing rig was reduced. On 10 August, she finally entered service with the Torpedo School at Kiel, where Alfred von Tirpitz served as her first commander.

In the years that Blücher was in service, the majority of German naval officers and enlisted men received their torpedo training aboard the ship, though she did not actually begin training new crews until 1 May 1881. She was initially based in the Kieler Förde, and on 17 September she participated in a naval review to demonstrate the new torpedo weapons for Kaiser Wilhelm I. While off Friedrichsort outside of Kiel, the Torpedo School conducted a series of demonstrations that began with four torpedo-armed pinnaces launching torpedoes at targets, followed by Blücher, which approached at full speed and launched torpedoes at the anchored target ship Elbe, scoring a direct hit amidships and sinking her. On 27 October, Blücher was decommissioned following the end of the annual training maneuvers.

In 1882, the torpedo boat Ulan was assigned as Blücher's tender. From 22 June to 15 July, Blücher went on a training cruise in the Baltic Sea, which was followed by the annual fleet training exercises held in August and September. She spent the entirety of 1883 in commission, the first year she did so. In 1884, the navy organized a torpedo boat division for the first time, which included Kühn, Flink, Scharf, Sicher, Tapfer, and Vorwärts and the torpedo gunboat Jäger. During tests on 4 August, the old gunboat Wolf was sunk as a target. Blücher then went to Wilhelmshaven in September to assist in the testing of new torpedo boats being built there. She spent 1885 conducting training exercises with the torpedo boats in the training squadron. In 1886, the ship was assigned to the newly formed Inspektion des Torpedowesens (Torpedo Inspectorate); the year passed uneventfully, apart from a short trip to Wilhelmshaven.

On 1 October, Blücher was decommissioned for a major overhaul. The Kaiserliche Admiralität (Imperial Admiralty) considered restoring Blücher to a fully-functional warship, with her place in the Torpedo School taken by the frigate Elisabeth, but this plan was not adopted. In the course of the overhaul, the ship's classrooms were modernized and search lights were installed on the deck to allow night-time torpedo training. On 30 April 1887, Blücher returned to service and she participated in a naval review held to celebrate the beginning of work on the Kaiser Wilhelm Canal in June. For the following year, Blücher was occupied with the normal routine of training exercises. She participated in training maneuvers in Norwegian waters off Kristiansand in 1889 that emphasized long-range firing.

=== 1891–1909 ===
Owing to the increased demands of the development of torpedo tactics, the Admiralität allocated the new aviso Greif to that purpose, allowing Blücher to focus solely on training of torpedo crews. The year 1891 passed uneventfully, and in May 1892 she began another major overhaul. Her place as the torpedo training ship was temporarily taken by the old ironclad warship Sachsen, which held the role until 1 December. In early 1893, Blücher returned to service; on 6 September three members of her crew had an accident off Kiel, where they accidentally capsized their boat. Blücher served as the flagship of IV. Division during the annual fleet maneuvers that year. From 1894, Blücher and Greif operated together. On 18 September, Blücher assisted the protected cruiser Prinzess Wilhelm, which had run aground of the island of Bornholm.

In 1895, Blücher took part in celebrations marking the opening of the Kaiser Wilhelm Canal, and in September that year she underwent another overhaul. Her place in the Torpedo School was taken by the ironclad Friedrich Carl. The following year, Blücher again served as a divisional flagship during the annual training exercises in August and September. By this time, work began on the new Torpedo School in Flensburg-Mürwik, since the strong currents and increased shipping traffic through the Kaiser Wilhelm Canal made it difficult to continue operations in Kiel. Flensburg also offered greater distances, which were necessary for the latest models of torpedoes that had significantly increased ranges. The years 1897 and 1898 passed in the same routine as previous years, with stints as the training squadron flagship during the fleet maneuvers both years.

In 1900, Blücher was decommissioned for another major overhaul at the Kaiserliche Werft in Kiel, with her place again taken by Friedrich Carl. She returned to service on 2 April 1901, but while in transit from the shipyard, she slipped a screw and had to be taken under tow. On 31 October 1902, the new Torpedo School was opened and Blücher was transferred to Flensburg, along with four torpedo boats. The ironclad Württemberg was assigned to the Torpedo School to support Blücher and the torpedo boats. By 1906, Blücher had deteriorated significantly in condition, and on 25 September, she was reduced to serve only as a stationary training and barracks ship.

On 6 November 1907, Blücher suffered a serious boiler explosion. The boiler had not been used for several weeks, and the crew failed to prepare it properly, causing the high-pressure steam line to blow out the front wall of the boiler. The resulting explosion pierced the deck forward and aft of the funnel, causing serious damage to the ship. Ten men were killed instantly in the explosion and another twenty-four were seriously wounded, of whom another six died later. Casualties were limited by the fact that most of the crew were ashore at the time of the accident. Blücher was towed into port at Flensburg where a thorough investigation of the accident took place. On 29 February 1908, she was stricken from the naval register. Uranus (formerly the ironclad Kaiser) was converted into a barracks ship to take Blücher's place, and the latter vessel was sold to a private company from Rotterdam, which used the vessel as a coal storage hulk in Vigo, Spain. Her ultimate fate is unknown. For the victims of the explosion, a memorial was erected in Flensburg in February 1909 and the ship's figurehead was placed at the Naval Academy Mürwik.
