= SMS Bismarck =

Screw corvette of the German Imperial Navy

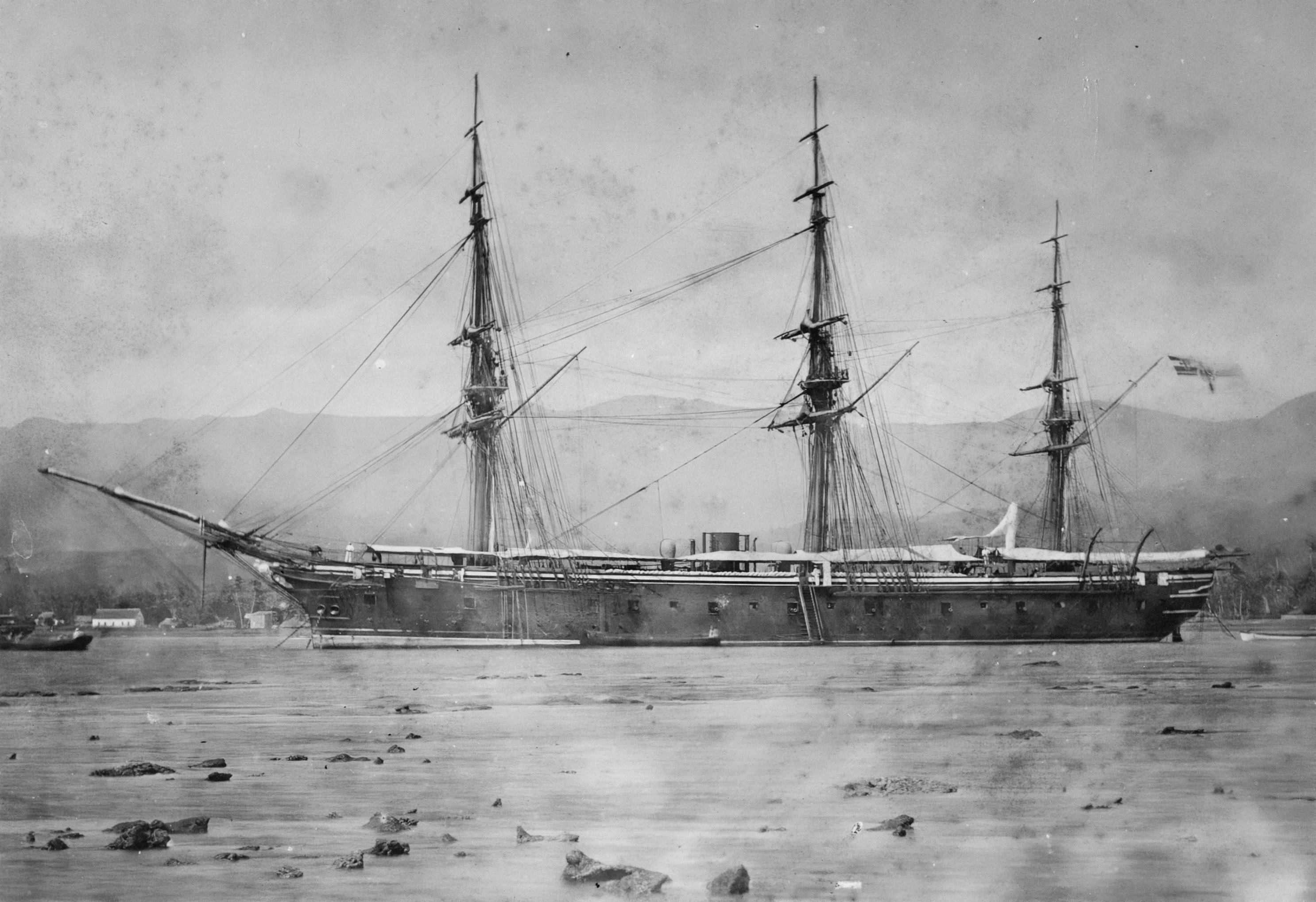
- SMS Bismarck, 1879

History

German Empire
- Name: SMS Bismarck
- Builder: Norddeutsche Schiffbau, Kiel
- Laid down: November 1875
- Launched: 25 July 1877
- Completed: 27 August 1878
- Decommissioned: 21 September 1891
- Fate: Scrapped, 1920

General characteristics
- Class & type: Bismarck-class corvette
- Displacement: Full load: 3,332 t (3,279 long tons)
- Length: 82.5 m (270 ft 8 in)
- Beam: 13.7 m (44 ft 11 in)
- Draft: 6.18 m (20 ft 3 in)
- Installed power: 2,500 ihp (1,900 kW); 4 × fire-tube boilers
- Propulsion: 1 × screw propeller; 1 × marine steam engine
- Speed: 12 knots (22 km/h; 14 mph)
- Range: 2,380 nmi (4,410 km; 2,740 mi) at 9 knots (17 km/h; 10 mph)
- Complement: 404
- Armament: 16 × 15 cm (5.9 in) guns

SMS Bismarck was a Bismarck-class corvette built for the German Imperial Navy (Kaiserliche Marine) in the late 1870s. She was the lead ship of her class, which included five other vessels. The Bismarck-class corvettes were ordered as part of a major naval construction program in the early 1870s, and she was designed to serve as a fleet scout and on extended tours in Germany's colonial empire. Bismarck was laid down in November 1875, launched in July 1877, and was commissioned into the fleet in August 1878. She was armed with a battery of sixteen 15 cm (5.9 in) guns and had sails, a full ship rig to supplement her steam engine on long cruises abroad.

Bismarck went on two major overseas cruises, the first in late 1878 to late 1880, visiting South American ports and patrolling the Central Pacific, where Germany had economic interests but no formal colonies at that time. During this cruise, she interfered with Samoan internal affairs and protected German interests in South America during the War of the Pacific. After returning to Germany, she was overhauled and received a new gun battery. Bismarck was reactivated in 1883 as Germany prepared to embark on the scramble for Africa.

The second deployment lasted from 1884 to 1888, when Germany began to seize colonies in Africa and the Pacific; Bismarck was closely involved in the acquisition of Kamerun in 1884, the settlement of borders for German East Africa in 1885 and 1886, and German intervention in the Samoan Civil War in 1887. For the entirety of this tour abroad, Bismarck served as the flagship of the German overseas cruiser squadron commanded by Eduard von Knorr and later Karl Eduard Heusner. After returning to Germany in 1888, the ship was decommissioned and stricken from the naval register in 1891, thereafter seeing use as a barracks ship until 1920, when she was broken up.

== Design ==
An unidentified Bismarck-class corvette

After the Franco-Prussian War of 1870–1871, the newly formed Kaiserliche Marine (Imperial Navy) began an expansion program to strengthen the fleet. The naval command determined that modern steam corvettes were necessary for scouting purposes, as well as overseas cruising duties to protect German interests abroad. The six ships of the Bismarck class were ordered in the early 1870s to supplement Germany's fleet of cruising warships, which at that time relied on several ships that were twenty years old. They were designed as a smaller and more economical version of the preceding Leipzig-class corvettes.

Bismarck was 82.5 meters (270 ft 8 in) long overall, with a beam of 13.7 m (44 ft 11 in) and a draft of 5.68 m (18 ft 8 in) forward. She displaced 3,386 metric tons (3,333 long tons) at full load. The ship's crew consisted of 18 officers and 386 enlisted men. Her hull had a straight stem and was sheathed with zinc to prevent marine biofouling on long voyages abroad.

She was powered by a single marine steam engine that drove one 2-bladed screw propeller, with steam provided by four coal-fired fire-tube boilers, which was vented through a single, retractable funnel. Her propulsion system gave her a top speed of 12.5 knots (23.2 km/h; 14.4 mph) at 2,530 metric horsepower (2,500 ihp). She had a cruising radius of 2,380 nautical miles (4,410 km; 2,740 mi) at a speed of 9 knots (17 km/h; 10 mph). As built, Bismarck was equipped with a full ship rig, but this was later reduced.

Bismarck was armed with a battery of sixteen 15 cm (5.9 in) 22-caliber (cal.) breech-loading guns and four 8 cm (3.1 in) 25-cal. guns. She had two 35 cm (14 in) torpedo tubes in her bow, above the waterline. Her armament was revised several times during her career; by 1890, the number of 15 cm guns had been reduced to ten. She also had six 3.7 cm (1.5 in) Hotchkiss revolver cannon installed for close-range defense against torpedo boats. In the early 1900s, she was rearmed with a pair of 10.5 cm (4.1 in) guns, ten 8.8 cm (3.5 in) guns, and four 3.7 cm guns.

== Service history ==
The keel for Bismarck was laid down at the Norddeutsche Schiffbau AG (North German Shipyard) in Kiel in November 1875 under the contract name "B", which denoted that she was a new addition to the fleet, rather than a replacement for a vessel then in service. (Note: German warships were ordered under provisional names. Additions to the fleet were given a single letter; ships intended to replace older or lost vessels were ordered as "Ersatz (name of the ship to be replaced)".) Her completed hull was launched on 25 July 1877; she was christened by Admiral Albrecht von Stosch, the head of the Kaiserliche Admiralität (Imperial Admiralty). The ship was commissioned on 27 August 1878 and thereafter began sea trials. These were completed by 1 October, when she was activated for an overseas deployment. Bismarck was transferred to Wilhelmshaven to be equipped for the voyage.

=== First overseas deployment ===
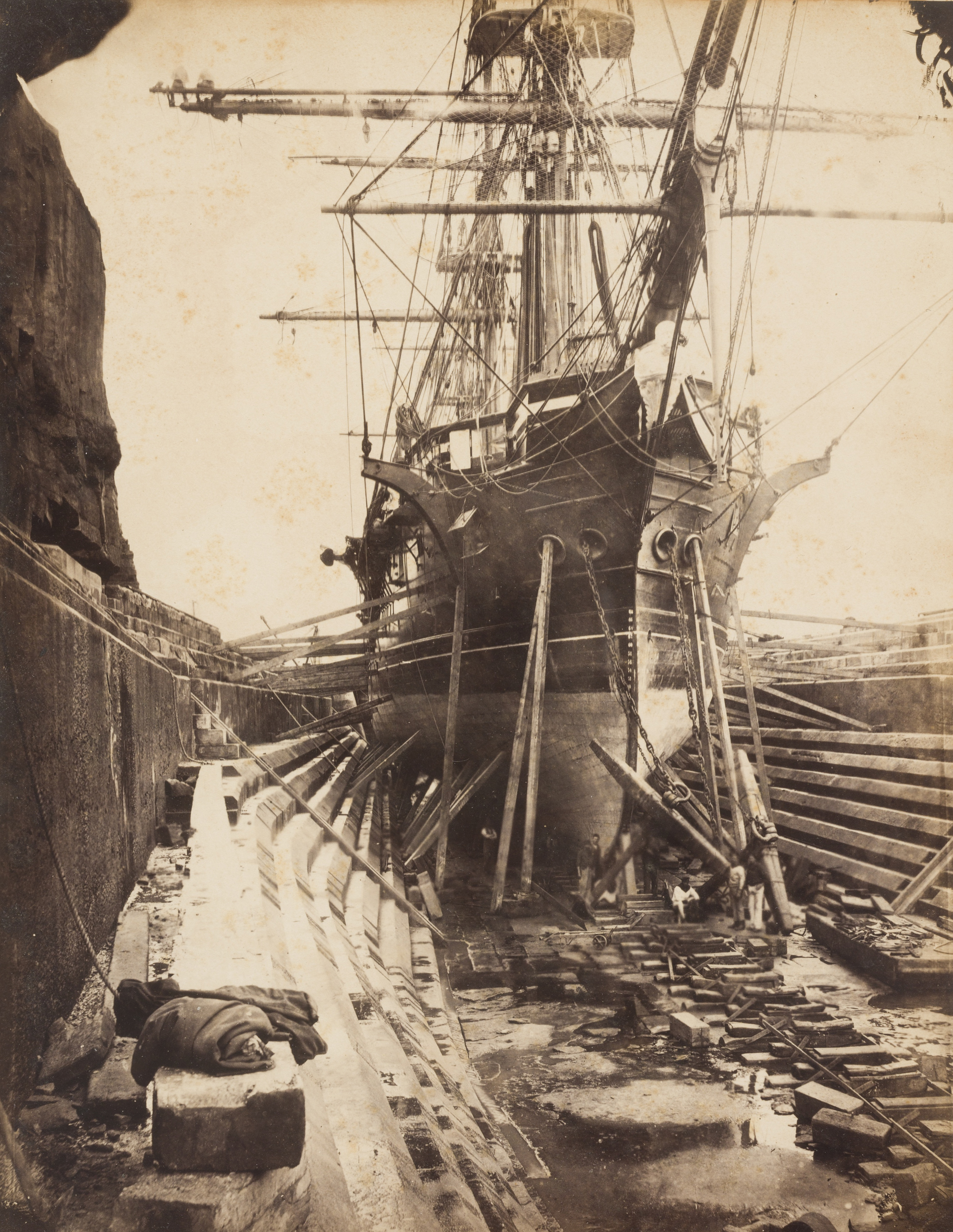
Bismarck in dry dock, Sydney, c. 1879

Bismarck left Wilhelmshaven on 22 November under the command of Kapitän zur See (Captain at Sea) Karl August Deinhard and proceeded through the Atlantic Ocean, visiting Montevideo, Uruguay from 12 to 20 January 1879, then proceeding through the Strait of Magellan into the Pacific Ocean and stopping in Valparaíso, Chile. Bismarck conducted hydrographic surveys while sailing from Germany to the Pacific. She then proceeded to the Society Islands, visiting Raiatea, Bora Bora, and Huahine, where the ship's commander concluded a friendship treaty with the local ruler, which was signed in the German consulate in Papeete on the island of Tahiti. Bismarck thereafter joined the gunboat Albatross and relieved the corvette Ariadne, which returned to Germany.

Bismarck began a trip around the islands of the central Pacific on 22 May to familiarize the crew with the conditions in the region. Albatross arrived in the central Pacific on 30 July, allowing Bismarck to sail on 8 August to Sydney, Australia, for an overhaul. The ship was urgently recalled to Samoa after the repair work was completed, owing to unrest in the islands that threatened German traders. Bismarck later carried the recently appointed consul-general from Tongatapu to Apia in Samoa on 1 November. She then sailed to Levuka on the island of Ovalau to replenish her stock of coal, before returning to Samoa to try to negotiate a settlement to the conflict on the islands. There, she was joined by the gunboat Nautilus, which was sent to increase the leverage the Germans had to pressure the competing factions to recognize the Malietoa Talavou Tonumaipeʻa as the ruler of all Samoans.

Eight men aboard Bismarck had died due to tropical diseases by early 1880, and the Admiralität decided to recall the vessel. On 26 January 1880, the ship left Apia and after reaching Levuka, she was damaged in a severe storm, which forced her to go to Sydney for repairs. While she was being repaired, the Admiralität altered her original route and ordered her to proceed to the west coast of South America to support the ironclad Hansa, which was protecting German interests in the area during the War of the Pacific. Bismarck patrolled Chilean and Peruvian harbors from 26 May to 12 July; on 18 July, she left Chile and rounded Cape Horn, passing through heavy storms in the Strait of Magellan. She stopped in Port Stanley in the Falkland Islands before proceeding to Plymouth and ultimately reaching Wilhelmshaven on 30 September. There, she was decommissioned on 14 October. The ship's namesake, Chancellor Otto von Bismarck, invited the ship's commander to his manor at Friedrichsruh to inform him of the events of their voyage.

=== Second overseas deployment ===
==== 1884–1885, West African operations ====
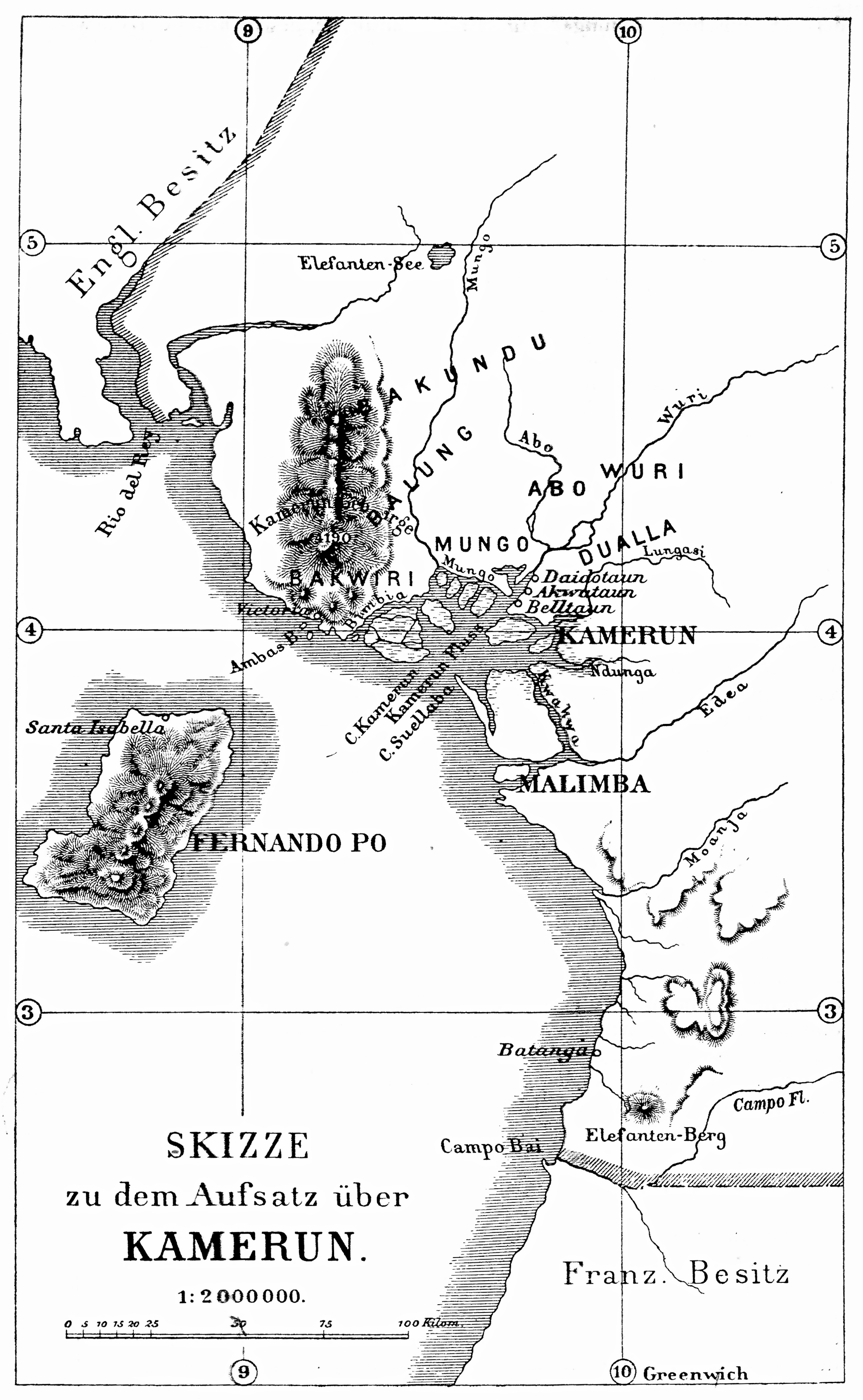
1887 map of the coast of Kamerun; the area denoted as Doualla was the site of Bismarck's operations against locals hostile to German rule

In early 1881, Bismarck went into the Kaiserliche Werft (Imperial Shipyard) in Wilhelmshaven for an extensive overhaul of her propulsion system. During this refit bow torpedo tubes were installed, and her original 15 cm guns were replaced by more modern quick-firing guns of the same caliber. She went through another round of sea trials from 2 to 13 August 1883, though since June 1882 she had been designated as part of the I. Reserve owing to the tensions related to the Anglo-Egyptian War. By the mid-1880s, the European powers had embarked on the scramble for Africa, and German firms, including Jantzen & Thormählen and the Woermann-Linie, began to press the German government to acquire colonies as well. To this end, the firms attempted to incite attacks from local rulers in West Africa against German traders in the region to try to force the government to place the region under German control. As a result of these incidents, Bismarck, despite his long dislike of overseas colonies, decided to send a squadron to the Bight of Biafra to protect German interests.

On 17 September 1884, the Admiralität organized the West African Cruiser Squadron, under the command of Konteradmiral (Rear Admiral) Eduard von Knorr, to reinforce the gunboat Möwe. Knorr raised his flag aboard Bismarck on 15 October, and in addition to Möwe, Knorr's squadron included Bismarck's sister ship Gneisenau and the corvettes Olga and Ariadne. The four corvettes left Germany on 30 October. To supply the squadron in a remote region with no harbor facilities, the navy acquired the steamship Adler as a tender and a hospital ship, though the vessel remained a civilian ship. While en route, Ariadne was detached to Cape Verde and Gneisenau was sent to East Africa, since reports indicated the situation in West Africa had calmed. Bismarck and Olga reached the Wouri River on 17 December. Shortly before their arrival, two anti-German groups burned down the village of a pro-German tribe.

Knorr decided to intervene immediately, and sent ashore a landing party of some three hundred men from Bismarck and Olga to arrest the leaders of the anti-German tribes and destroy their villages. The troops from Bismarck that went ashore on 20 December brought with them a pair of field guns, one of 8.8 cm and the other of 3.7 cm. They landed north of Hickorytown, while the men from Olga went ashore south of the village with an 8.8 cm gun of their own. The Germans fought their way into the town, forcing the local forces to retreat into the mangrove forest, where they could not easily be pursued. Then-Lieutenant Reinhard Scheer led the landing party from Bismarck during this operation. While this operation was underway, Knorr received word that other hostile locals had attacked the trading post operated by Jantzen & Thormählen in Joss Town and had captured the company's local manager, who was later murdered. Knorr sent Olga upriver to shell enemy positions, and on 22 December, the landing parties returned to their ships, having lost one man killed aboard Olga and eight men wounded between the two ships.

Bismarck and Olga remained in the area through January 1885, by which time the unrest had subsided. In March, the Germans succeeded in compelling the local rulers to hand over the murderer of Jantzen & Thormählen's manager, who they executed. Knorr detached Möwe, which had arrived in the area on 31 December 1884, to East Africa to join Gneisenau, and on 31 March 1885, the gunboat Habicht arrived to relieve Olga, which returned to Germany in company with Adler. Knorr temporarily reassigned Möwe to carry the German Commissioner for West Africa, Gustav Nachtigal, back to Germany; Nachtigal had fallen seriously ill, and he died while en route, allowing Möwe to instead proceed to East Africa as originally planned. While this went on, Bismarck continued to patrol off Cameroon until Knorr received orders to join the rest of his ships in East Africa, though he was delayed until 7 July, as he had to wait on the arrival of Julius von Soden, the first governor of the colony of Kamerun. In the meantime, Bismarck carried out surveying work in the Wouri delta and assisted in marking the official border between German Togoland and French Dahomey. At this time, the second station ship, the gunboat Cyclop, also arrived in West Africa.

==== 1885–1886, East Africa and the Central Pacific ====
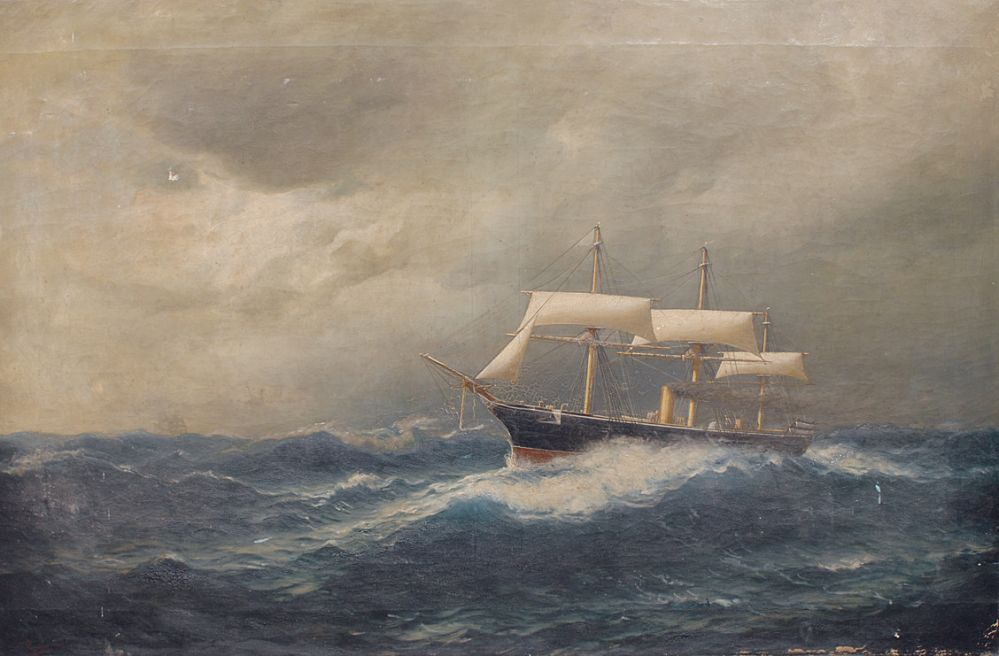
Painting of Bismarck in the Indian Ocean

Departing from West Africa on 7 July, Bismarck sailed to Sao Paulo de Luanda in Portuguese Angola and then to Lüderitz Bay in German South West Africa, before proceeding to Cape Town for an overhaul. There, Bismarck was joined by Adler, which had again been chartered by the navy to serve as a tender. Knorr was instructed to use the cruiser squadron to reinforce the German position during complicated negotiations with Barghash bin Said, the Sultan of Zanzibar, who had disputed German claims to protectorates in what had been proclaimed as German East Africa. Bismarck and Adler left Cape Town on 5 August and arrived off Zanzibar on 19 August, where they joined the corvettes Gneisenau, Stosch, and Prinz Adalbert, the frigate Elisabeth, and Möwe.

Kommodore (Commodore) Carl Heinrich Theodor Paschen, who commanded Stosch, had already forced the Sultan to accede to German demands by the time Knorr arrived, leaving only the signing of a formal agreement remaining; Knorr signed the treaty of friendship aboard Bismarck on 12 December. At that time, he released Stosch and Prinz Adalbert to return to Germany, in company with Adler. By the end of 1885, the squadron under Knorr's command consisted of Bismarck, Gneisenau, Möwe, Olga, and the gunboat Hyäne, Olga having arrived from West Africa and Hyäne having left the Central Pacific. The ships cruised the coast of East Africa into early 1886, at which point the East Africa Cruiser Squadron was dissolved. Gneisenau was ordered home, Möwe and Hyäne were to remain in African waters as station ships, and the three corvettes were sent to Australia.

The Admiralität had decided that newly acquired territories in German New Guinea needed further reinforcement, and so ordered the creation of a new cruiser squadron, again under the command of Knorr. Bismarck and the other members of the squadron departed from Zanzibar on 9 January 1886 and passed through the Indian Ocean to Australia, arriving in Sydney on 28 February. The ships then went to Auckland, New Zealand before proceeding to Tonga. Bismarck and the other ships continued on to Samoa, where they found the Samoan Civil War underway. Tupua Tamasese Titimaea, one of the Samoan chiefs vying for power, unsuccessfully sought to convince Knorr and the German consul to support his faction. Unwilling to intervene at this time, Knorr took his ships to the Marshall Islands in early May, where they joined Nautilus. Bismarck stopped in Majuro, where a parade was held.

Bismarck then sailed to New Guinea in company with Olga; the ships stopped in Matupi Harbor, where a German national had been murdered. The ships sent landing party ashore to punish those responsible for the killing. Bismarck then sailed on alone to Finschhafen while Olga went to the island of New Mecklenburg. The two ships reunited for a trip to East Asian waters, stopping in the Mariana Islands while en route. They reached Hong Kong on 23 July, where they met Nautilus and the gunboat Wolf. The corvette Carola also arrived in Hong Kong, a replacement for Gneisenau, which had been ordered home while the ships were still in East Africa. On 21 August, the ships dispersed to various ports to show the flag; Bismarck and Carola went to Port Arthur, China. After several cases of typhus broke out among members of the squadron's crews, the ships went to Nagasaki where the sick crewmen were treated.

While in Nagasaki, Knorr received orders to return to East Africa to effect the final settlement of borders that had been agreed upon in the London Treaty of 29 October 1886. The Sultan of Zanzibar again made contrary border claims, which needed to be settled, and the German explorer Karl Ludwig Jühlke had been murdered, necessitating a military response. All of the large ships left East Asia, leaving behind only the gunboats. When Bismarck, Olga, and Carola arrived in Zanzibar on 14 December, they met the corvette Sophie and the gunboats Möwe and Hyäne. Knorr sent Olga, Carola, and Hyäne to Wituland to raise the German flag there and then to Kismayu, where they received Jühlke's murderer, while Knorr remained in Zanzibar with the rest of the ships to settle the disagreements with bin Said. Once these issues were finalized, Knorr dispersed his ships to patrol the coast of the colony and to conduct survey work. These operations were interrupted in early 1887 when increased tensions between Germany and France prompted the Admiralität to order Knorr's squadron to go to Cape Town, where it would be closer to West Africa, as Germany's colonies there neighbored French colonies.

==== 1887–1920, Central Pacific and fate ====
Map of the colonial holdings of European powers in the Pacific Ocean, c. 1914

Bismarck and the rest of the squadron remained there from 15 March to 7 May, by which time tensions had subsided; during this period, on 15 April, Knorr transferred command of the squadron to Kapitän zur See Karl Eduard Heusner, who also made Bismarck his flagship. After tensions eased, Heusner received orders to return to the Central Pacific. His squadron left Cape Town on 7 May and arrived in Sydney on 9 June, where they met Albatross, which was on her way back to Germany owing to problems with her engine. The gunboat Adler then joined the squadron, which participated in the celebrations for the 40th anniversary of Queen Victoria's reign. The German squadron then departed Sydney on 3 August, bound for Apia, where they arrived sixteen days later. The Samoan Civil War was still ongoing there, and a raid by Malietoa Laupepa's forces on German nationals led to a declaration of war. Heusner send a 500-man landing corps ashore on 25 August to occupy the government buildings on the island. The Germans also officially recognized Tamasese as the legitimate malietoa.

Laupepa surrendered to German forces and he was taken aboard Adler to Cooktown, Australia, where he transferred to Albatross, which carried him to Kamerun. Bismarck, Carola, and Sophie cruised to Kaiser-Wilhelmsland, while Olga and Adler were stationed in Apia to prevent any further disturbances. Later in 1887, the squadron cruised in East Asian waters, and on 6 January 1888, the ships stopped in Hong Kong with the gunboats Wolf and Iltis. Bismarck went to Nagasaki on 7 March for an overhaul; while this work was being completed, Heusner received orders to take the squadron back to East Africa and to detach Bismarck; the ship had been abroad for three and a half years, and was to return to Germany. On 16 July, Bismarck reached Aden, where she rendezvoused with the corvette Leipzig. The two ships then began the voyage back to Germany the following day, arriving in the Jade Bight on 19 August.

Bismarck was decommissioned on 1 September. A major overhaul was planned for 1889, but this was cancelled and she was stricken from the naval register on 21 September 1891. She was thereafter used as a barracks ship, initially for the II. Torpedoboat Division, based in Wilhelmshaven. In 1903, she was reconstructed to serve more effectively as a barracks, and she remained in service in this capacity until 1920, when she was sold for scrap and broken up in Rüstingen. According to the naval historians Hans Hildebrand, Albert Röhr, and Hans-Otto Steinmetz, there was no legitimate reason to discard the ship after just twelve years in service, as evidenced by the fact that her hull survived until 1920. They hypothesize that the decision was made by Kaiser Wilhelm II, who intended it to be a personal slight to the ship's namesake, with whom Wilhelm II disagreed strongly. Nevertheless, on 1 April 1895, Bismarck's 80th birthday, Vizeadmiral (Vice Admiral) Carl Ferdinand Batsch presented him with a gift made from wood from Bismarck's mainmast.
