= List of screw corvettes of Germany =

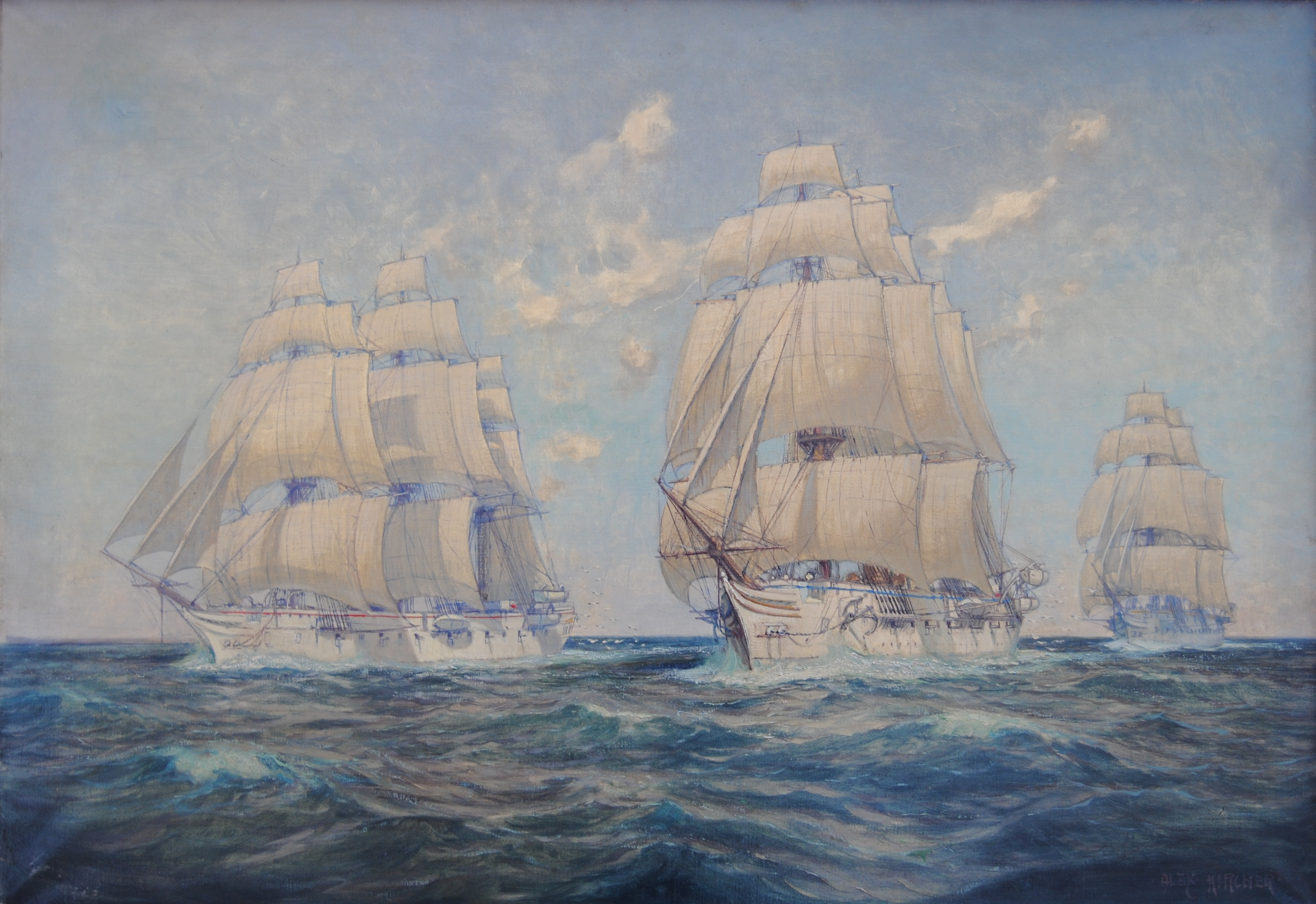
A painting of Stosch, Stein, and Gneisenau under sail, by Alexander Kircher

From the 1860s to the 1880s, Prussia and later the German Empire built a series of screw corvettes to expand and modernize its fleet of cruising warships. In total, twenty-three ships of the type were built, mostly between six different ship classes. The first two ships, the Nymphe class, were built in the early 1860s as Prussia began to prepare for an eventual conflict with Denmark over the Schleswig–Holstein question, though only Nymphe entered service in time for the Second Schleswig War in 1864. During the war, Prussia purchased the two Augusta-class corvettes that had been secretly ordered by the Confederate States Navy from France, after the French Emperor Napoleon III blocked their delivery to the Confederates. The three ships of the Ariadne class were laid down in the late 1860s and early 1870s, and these were followed by two Leipzig-class corvettes in the early 1870s. The six-ship Bismarck class was built in the mid-1870s to early 1880s, and was followed by another group of six ships, the Carola class. A further two vessels, Nixe and Charlotte, were built in the early 1880s specifically to serve as training ships, a role that many of the older corvettes had begun to fill by that time.

Nymphe was the only ship of the type to see action against an enemy warship, taking part in the Battle of Jasmund during the Second Schleswig War in 1864 and an attack on a blockading French squadron during the Franco-Prussian War in 1870. Augusta was activated during the Franco-Prussian War to raid French shipping in the Atlantic Ocean, capturing three ships carrying war materiel, two of which were taken as prizes and the third sunk. Nymphe's sister Medusa was in Japan during the war, where she was blockaded by a French squadron and saw no combat. Throughout the 1860s, 1870s, and 1880s, German corvettes went on numerous deployments abroad, frequently to South America, the Mediterranean Sea, China, and the central Pacific Ocean. These voyages were aimed at protecting Prussian and later German nationals abroad, German economic interests, and later the establishment and patrolling of the German colonial empire.

As the ships were replaced with newer vessels, beginning with several unprotected cruisers, they were frequently converted into training ships. In addition to training in German waters, this role involved overseas training cruises, typically to the Mediterranean and the West Indies. While on these cruises, the ships were frequently called to carry out the same responsibilities as front-line warships, protecting Germans during periods of unrest in foreign countries and showing the flag. Most of the corvettes were sold for scrap between the 1880s and 1920s, but two were lost in accidents; Augusta was sunk by a cyclone in the Gulf of Aden in 1885 and the Bismarck-class ship Gneisenau was wrecked in a storm off Málaga in 1900. Nixe, the last surviving ship of the type, was converted into a lighter in the early 1920s and was ultimately broken up in 1930.

Key
Armament	The number and type of the primary armament
Displacement	Ship displacement at full combat load
Propulsion	Number of shafts, type of propulsion system, and top speed generated
Service	The dates work began and finished on the ship and its ultimate fate
Laid down	The date the keel assembly commenced
Commissioned	The date the ship was commissioned

== Nymphe class ==
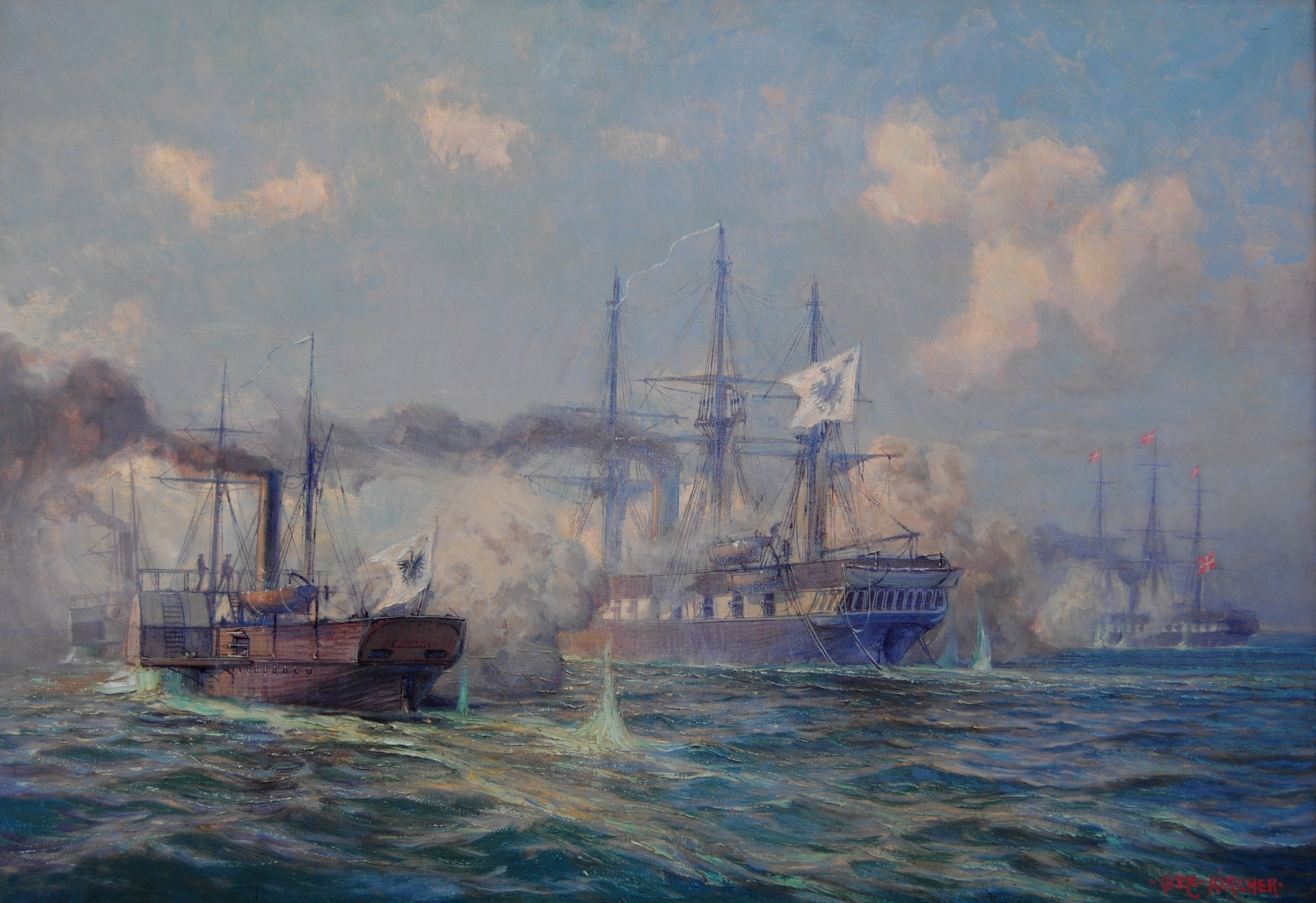
Painting of Nymphe (center) at the Battle of Jasmund, also by Alexander Kircher

As early as the 1850s, the Prussian Navy began to make preparations for a naval expansion program, starting with the Arcona-class screw frigates in 1854. The navy decided that smaller screw corvettes would also be useful, and so later in the decade began to prepare designs for the new type of ship. The navy envisioned using the ships for traditional cruiser duties, including scouting for the fleet, showing the flag, protecting Prussian merchant vessels, and attacking enemy shipping. Since these activities would require extended periods at sea, the ships' hulls were coppered to protect them from biofouling, and they were fitted with a full ship rig to supplement their steam engines. The two Nymphe-class corvettes were ordered in 1861 in response to rising tensions with Denmark over the Schleswig–Holstein question; the Prussian Navy sought to strengthen its fleet in preparation for a conflict with the stronger Royal Danish Navy. In addition, the order for the vessels was part of a conflict in the Prussian government over control of the kingdom's military expenditures; the liberals who controlled the Landtag (State Diet) objected to the army and navy modernization programs of Albrecht von Roon, and refused to allocate funds. Chancellor Otto von Bismarck used a loophole to secure funding for Roon's reforms, and the Nymphe class was ordered without parliamentary approval.

Nymphe was completed in time for the Second Schleswig War with Denmark in 1864, seeing action at the Battle of Jasmund, where she was heavily engaged, but only slightly damaged by a Danish frigate. During the Franco-Prussian War in 1870–1871, Medusa was blockaded in Yokohama, Japan, and saw no action. Nymphe was similarly blockaded in Danzig, Prussia, and she made a surprise nighttime attack on the French squadron, inflicting no damage but nevertheless convincing the French admiral that his ironclad warships were unsuitable for a close blockade of Prussian ports. Both ships went on extended cruises abroad during peacetime, and in the mid-1870s they were converted into training ships. In this guise, both vessels continued to make overseas cruises; Medusa was withdrawn from service in 1880 and hulked, but Nymphe remained in service until 1887, when she too was hulked. The two ships were sold for scrap in 1891 and thereafter broken up.

Summary of the Nymphe class
Ship	Armament	Displacement	Propulsion	Service		
Ship	Armament	Displacement	Propulsion	Laid down	Commissioned	Fate
Nymphe	10 × 36-pounder guns 6 × 12-pounder guns	1,202 metric tons (1,183 long tons)	1 shaft, 1 marine steam engine, 12 knots (22 km/h; 14 mph)	25 January 1862	25 November 1863	Broken up, 1891
Medusa	10 × 36-pounder guns 6 × 12-pounder guns	1,202 metric tons (1,183 long tons)	1 shaft, 1 marine steam engine, 12 knots (22 km/h; 14 mph)	6 February 1862	10 April 1867	Broken up, 1891

== Augusta class ==
Augusta, at some point before 1871

In 1862, during the American Civil War, the Confederate States Navy secretly placed an order for a pair of screw corvettes with the Arman Brothers shipyard of Bordeaux, France; these ships were to be named Mississippi and Louisiana. The ships were purportedly being built for Japan under the false names Yeddo and Osaka. Before the vessels could be delivered to the Confederate States, the French Emperor Napoleon III intervened in 1864 to prevent neutral France from selling the warships to an active belligerent. Instead, Arman offered the ships for sale to other countries, and Prussia, which was still trying to expand its fleet during the Second Schleswig War, purchased the vessels. The French government again intervened and tried to block Victoria from being transferred to the Prussian fleet, since it was also actively engaged in a conflict, but Bismarck negotiated her transfer before her armament was installed, by way of the Netherlands while under the French flag.

Both ships arrived too late in 1864 to see action against Denmark, and they did not see action against the Austrian Navy during the Austro-Prussian War of 1866, since the Austrian fleet was occupied with the Italian fleet in the Adriatic Sea. In the late 1860s, both ships were sent to Central America, where Augusta created a minor diplomatic incident over a Prussian attempt to secure a naval base at Puerto Limón, Costa Rica, which the Costa Rican government refused to allow and the United States viewed as an encroachment on its sphere of influence. During the Franco-Prussian War in 1871, Augusta was used to attack French shipping in the Atlantic, capturing two vessels and sinking a third before being trapped in Vigo, Spain, by a French squadron. The two ships went on further overseas deployments in the 1870s and 1880s, and while on a voyage to East Asia, Augusta was lost in a cyclone in the Gulf of Aden. Victoria, meanwhile, was removed from service in 1882 and served intermittently as a fishery protection vessel between 1884 and 1890 before being broken up in 1892.

Summary of the Augusta class
Ship	Armament	Displacement	Propulsion	Service		
Ship	Armament	Displacement	Propulsion	Laid down	Commissioned	Fate
Augusta	8 × 24-pounder guns 6 × 12-pounder guns	2,272 metric tons (2,236 long tons)	1 shaft, 1 marine steam engine, 13.5 knots (25 km/h; 15.5 mph)	1863	1864	Sank in a storm, 1885
Victoria	8 × 24-pounder guns 6 × 12-pounder guns	2,272 metric tons (2,236 long tons)	1 shaft, 1 marine steam engine, 13.5 knots (25 km/h; 15.5 mph)	1863	14 September 1864	Broken up, 1892

== Ariadne class ==
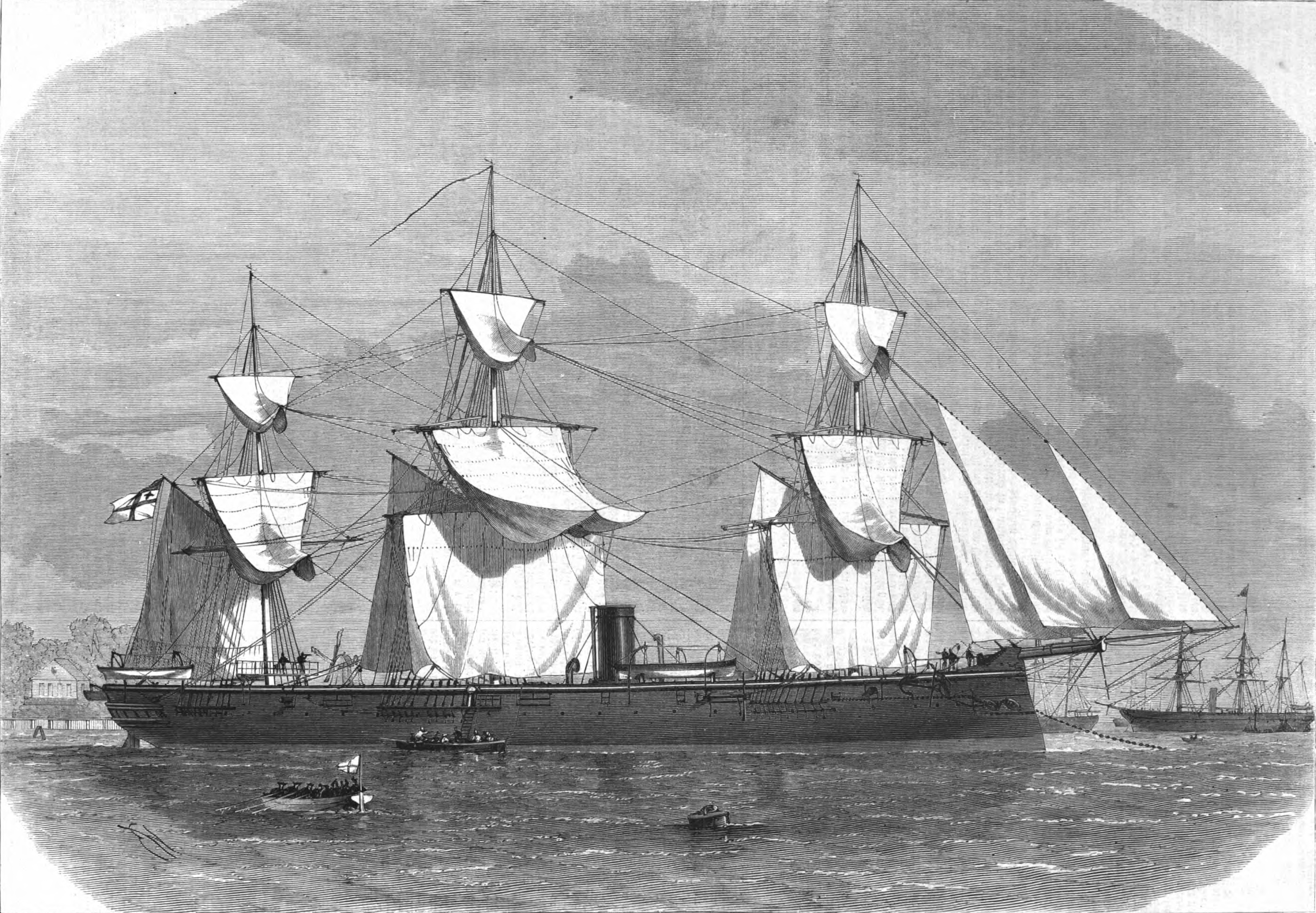
Illustration of Ariadne in 1871

By 1867, the Prussian Navy had been reorganized as the North German Federal Navy, Prussia having formed the North German Confederation in the wake of the Austro-Prussian War. The navy, under the direction of Konteradmiral (Rear Admiral) Eduard von Jachmann, formulated a new construction plan that year that laid out its priorities for ship building over the next several years. The plan called for a total of twenty screw corvettes, of which four had already been acquired—the Nymphe and Augusta classes. By the late 1860s, German overseas economic interests became more important as the German lands exported increasing amounts of manufactured goods; the corvettes of the 1867 fleet plan would be the backbone of the naval force that protected these activities. The first two ships of the Ariadne class were built to the same design, but the third vessel, Freya, was completed to a modified design with a longer hull, greater coal storage capacity, and heavier armament. A fourth ship of the class, to have been named Thusnelda, was intended to be built to Freya's design, but the navy cancelled this ship and reordered it as the first Leipzig-class corvette.

All three of the ships served extensively on overseas deployments throughout the 1870s and early 1880s, primarily in South America, the Mediterranean Sea, and East Asia. On these voyages, the ships and their captains performed a number of duties, including protecting German nationals during periods of unrest or open warfare in various countries, negotiating trade agreements with numerous governments, and combating piracy. They were also tasked with conducting scientific experiments and surveys to improve navigational charts. In the early to mid-1880s, all three of the ships were converted into training ships for apprentice seamen, and they went on training cruises over the course of the rest of the decade. These frequently went to the West Indies. While on one such training cruise in 1883, Freya helped to protect civilians in Haiti during a period of unrest on the island. All three ships were decommissioned by 1892, with Ariadne being immediately scrapped. Luise survived as a hulk and torpedo test ship until 1896 when she too was sold for scrap, and Freya simply saw no further use between her decommissioning in 1884 and her disposal in 1896.

Summary of the Ariadne class
Ship	Armament	Displacement	Propulsion	Service		
Ship	Armament	Displacement	Propulsion	Laid down	Commissioned	Fate
Ariadne	6 × 15 cm (5.9 in) guns 2 × 12 cm (4.7 in) guns	2,072 metric tons (2,039 long tons)	1 shaft, 1 marine steam engine, 14 knots (26 km/h; 16 mph)	1868	23 November 1872	Broken up, 1891
Luise	6 × 15 cm (5.9 in) guns 2 × 12 cm (4.7 in) guns	2,072 metric tons (2,039 long tons)	1 shaft, 1 marine steam engine, 14 knots (26 km/h; 16 mph)	1871	4 June 1874	Broken up, 1897
Freya	4 × 17 cm (6.7 in) guns 8 × 15 cm guns	2,406 metric tons (2,368 long tons)	1 shaft, 1 marine steam engine, 14 knots (26 km/h; 16 mph)	1874	1 October 1876	Broken up, 1897

== Leipzig class ==
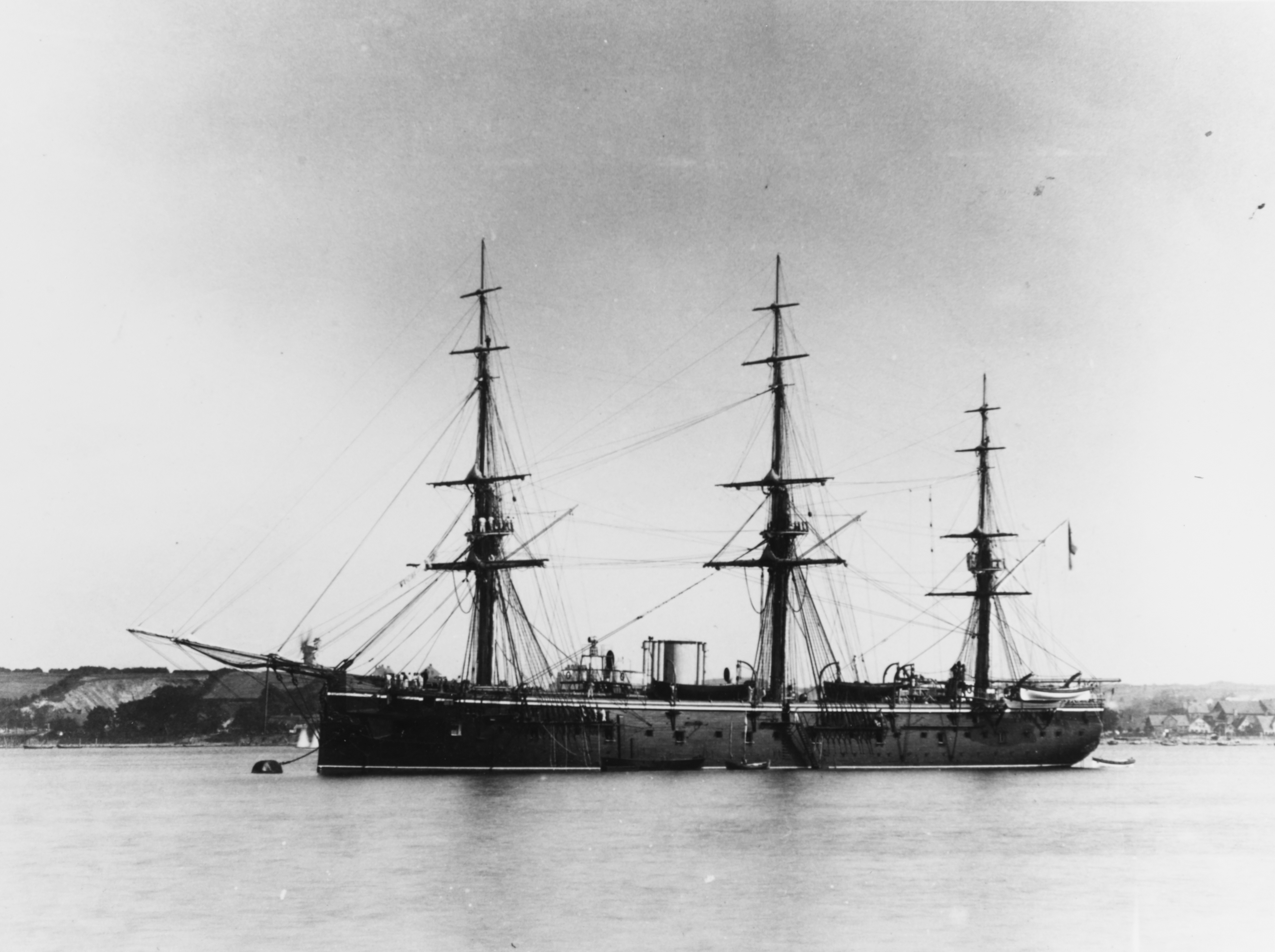
Prinz Adalbert in Wilhelmshaven in the 1880s

The two ships of the Leipzig class were ordered as part of the 1873 fleet plan of what was now the Kaiserliche Marine (Imperial Navy). This program, which was formulated by the first chief of the Kaiserliche Admiralität (Imperial Admiralty), General Albrecht von Stosch, adopted the same figure of twenty corvettes as Jachmann's earlier plan. Leipzig was initially to have been a sister to Freya, and had been ordered under the name Thusnelda, but by the time work actually began on the ship, she had been completely redesigned. Leipzig was significantly larger than Freya; her increased size allowed for a substantially stronger gun battery, a more powerful propulsion system, and more spacious crew quarters, which proved to be very useful on extended voyages overseas. Another major advance was the use of iron to build the ships' hulls instead of traditional timber frames and planking. Although earlier vessels had been intended to serve as fleet scouts, by the time Leipzig and Prinz Adalbert entered service in the mid-1870s, the widespread adoption of ironclad warships in European navies meant that such use was impractical, since unarmored warships would be useless against armored opponents. This fact was most clearly demonstrated by the Battle of Pacocha between Britain and Peru in 1877. As a result, the Leipzig class was to be used solely as overseas cruisers.

The ships went on two cruises each in the late 1870s and early 1880s, primarily to East Asia. In 1878, Leipzig was involved with a diplomatic dispute with Nicaragua. Prinz Adalbert was used to secure Germany's growing colonial empire in Africa. In the mid-1880s, Leipzig was heavily rebuilt to allow her use as a squadron flagship on foreign stations. She served abroad in this capacity from 1888 to 1893; during this extended deployment, she participated in the campaign to suppress the Abushiri revolt in German East Africa in 1888–1890. She then alternated between East Africa, China, and Chile, where she protected German nationals during the Chilean Civil War of 1891. In the meantime, Prinz Adalbert had been converted into a training ship in 1886, and served in that role for three years, before being reduced to a barracks ship in May 1890. In 1907, she was sold for scrap; by that time, Leipzig too had been reduced to a barracks ship and stationary training hulk in 1895, though she survived until 1919, when she sank accidentally. Raised in 1921, she too was broken up.

Summary of the Leipzig class
Ship	Armament	Displacement	Propulsion	Service		
Ship	Armament	Displacement	Propulsion	Laid down	Commissioned	Fate
Leipzig	2 × 17 cm (6.7 in) 25-cal. guns 10 × 17 cm 20-cal. guns	4,626 metric tons (4,553 long tons)	1 shaft, 1 marine steam engine, 15.8 knots (29.3 km/h; 18.2 mph)	1874	1 June 1877	Broken up, 1921
Prinz Adalbert	2 × 17 cm (6.7 in) 25-cal. guns 10 × 17 cm 20-cal. guns	4,626 metric tons (4,553 long tons)	1 shaft, 1 marine steam engine, 15.8 knots (29.3 km/h; 18.2 mph)	1875	28 August 1877	Broken up, 1907

== Bismarck class ==
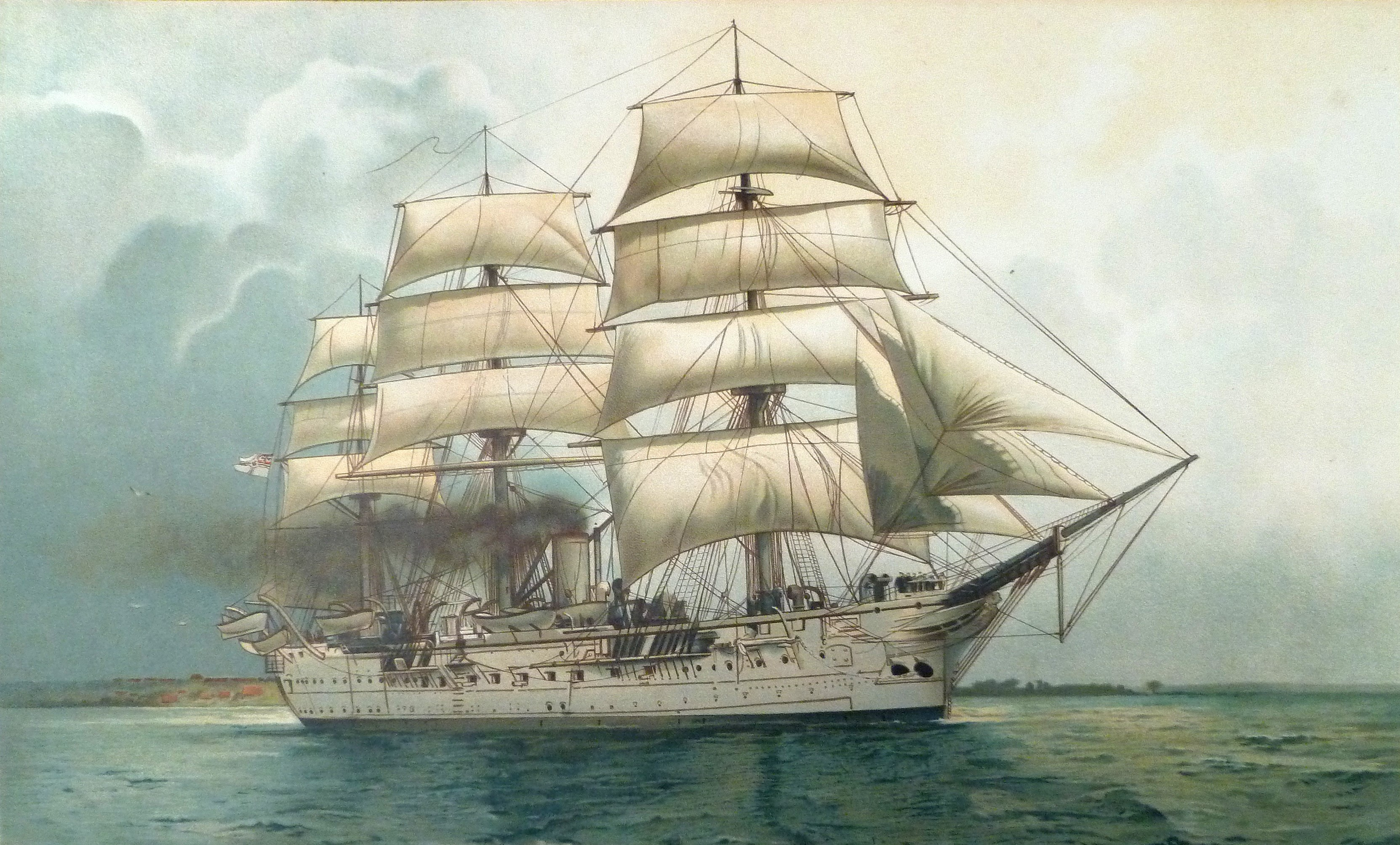
Stein in service as a training ship

Increased demands on the fleet to protect German overseas economic interests in the wake of the Franco-Prussian War necessitated the construction of new corvettes to shoulder the burden. In addition, by that time the vessels that had been acquired under the initial fleet plans had become worn out, making the acquisition of new vessels even more important. The Bismarck-class corvettes were based on the Leipzig design, but they were significantly scaled down. They had a displacement of more than a thousand tons less than the earlier vessels, carrying a lighter armament and less powerful engines. Since steam engines were still not reliable enough to be the only source of motive power, full ship rigs were retained.

The ships of the Bismarck class served in a variety of roles throughout their careers. Blücher was converted into a torpedo testing and training ship shortly after her completion, and she was used to help develop tactical doctrine and train officers and sailors in the use of torpedoes until she was badly damaged by a boiler explosion in 1907. Like Blücher, Stein served as a training ship for the bulk of her career, which was a fairly uneventful one, though it included several cruises abroad; she was converted into a barracks ship in 1908 and was scrapped in 1920. Bismarck was involved in the seizure of the colony of Kamerun in 1884, and she, Gneisenau, and Stosch were used to secure the protectorate of Wituland in 1885–1886, which later became German East Africa. Members of the class also cruised off South America to protect German interests, particularly during the War of the Pacific. Bismarck was the first member of the class to leave active service, being converted into a barracks ship in 1891. Gneisenau was wrecked off Málaga in late 1900 and Stosch was scrapped in 1907. Moltke was also reduced to a barracks ship in 1910, thereafter being renamed Acheron. The surviving members of the class were scrapped in 1920 as part of the disarmament process after World War I.

Summary of the Bismarck class
Ship	Armament	Displacement	Propulsion	Service		
Ship	Armament	Displacement	Propulsion	Laid down	Commissioned	Fate
Bismarck	10–16 × 15 cm guns	2,994 to 3,386 metric tons (2,947 to 3,333 long tons)	1 shaft, 1 marine steam engine, 12.5 to 13.9 knots (23.2 to 25.7 km/h; 14.4 to 16.0 mph)	November 1875	27 August 1878	Broken up, 1920
Blücher	7 × 35 cm (14 in) torpedo tubes	2,994 to 3,386 metric tons (2,947 to 3,333 long tons)	1 shaft, 1 marine steam engine, 12.5 to 13.9 knots (23.2 to 25.7 km/h; 14.4 to 16.0 mph)	March 1876	21 December 1878	Unknown
Stosch	10–16 × 15 cm guns	2,994 to 3,386 metric tons (2,947 to 3,333 long tons)	1 shaft, 1 marine steam engine, 12.5 to 13.9 knots (23.2 to 25.7 km/h; 14.4 to 16.0 mph)	November 1875	10 March 1878	Broken up, 1907
Moltke	10–16 × 15 cm guns	2,994 to 3,386 metric tons (2,947 to 3,333 long tons)	1 shaft, 1 marine steam engine, 12.5 to 13.9 knots (23.2 to 25.7 km/h; 14.4 to 16.0 mph)	July 1875	16 April 1878	Broken up, 1920
Gneisenau	10–16 × 15 cm guns	2,994 to 3,386 metric tons (2,947 to 3,333 long tons)	1 shaft, 1 marine steam engine, 12.5 to 13.9 knots (23.2 to 25.7 km/h; 14.4 to 16.0 mph)	June 1877	3 October 1880	Wrecked, 1900
Stein	10–16 × 15 cm guns	2,994 to 3,386 metric tons (2,947 to 3,333 long tons)	1 shaft, 1 marine steam engine, 12.5 to 13.9 knots (23.2 to 25.7 km/h; 14.4 to 16.0 mph)	1878	3 October 1880	Broken up, 1920

== Carola class ==
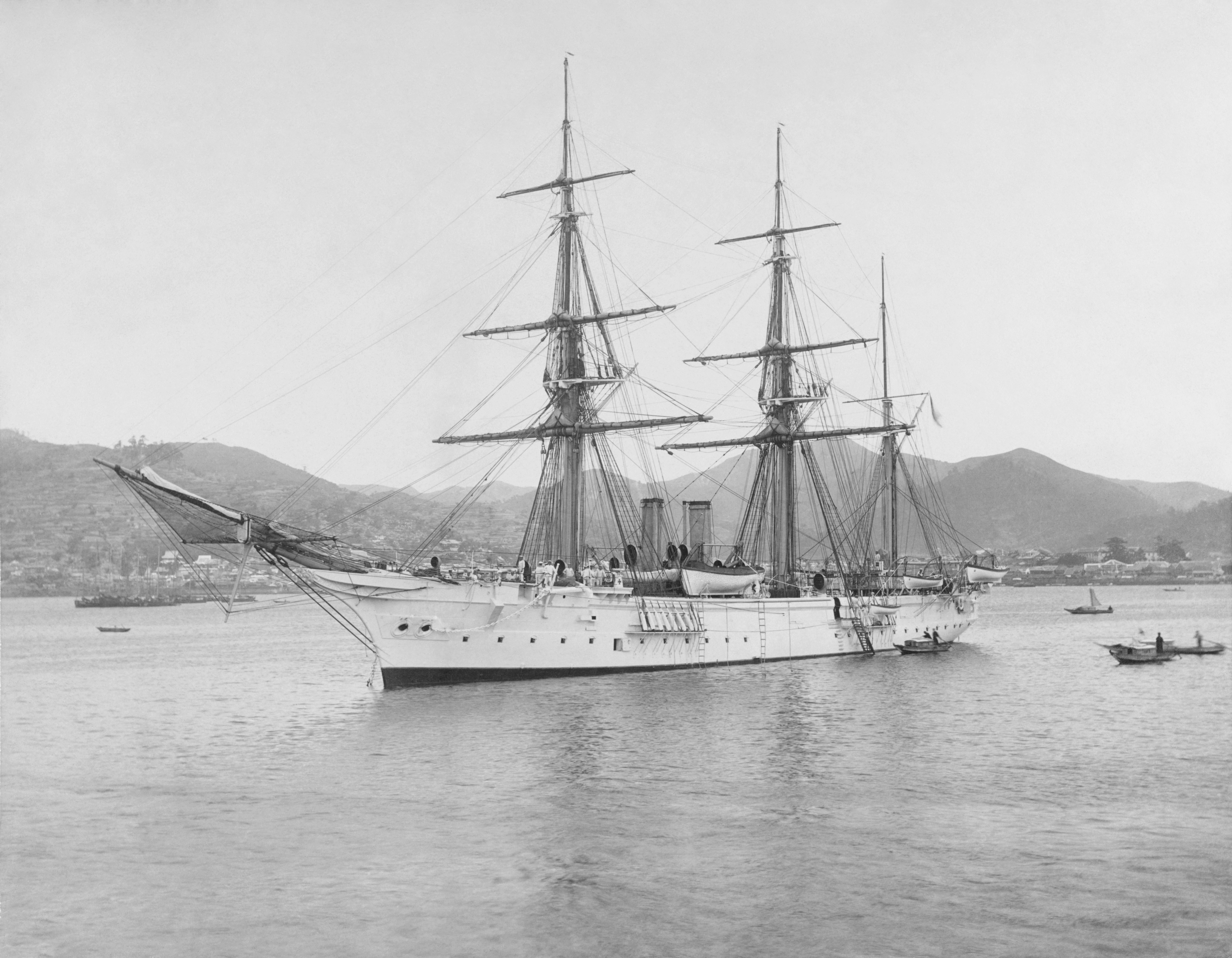
Arcona in Nagasaki, 1897

The Carola class was ordered shortly after the Bismarck class as part of the same program to expand and modernize the German cruising fleet. They were broadly similar in design, and while the Carolas were slightly smaller than the Bismarcks, they were broadly similar in capabilities, having a similar armament, speed, and cruising radius. They were also intended to serve on overseas stations, having barque rigs for long-range cruising. The first four vessels were built to the same design, but the last two, Alexandrine and Arcona, were completed to a modified design that was longer and utilized a two-shaft propulsion system, the first time such an arrangement was used in a German corvette design. The Carola class was an obsolescent design before work even started, however, as other navies began to build more modern unprotected cruisers for colonial duties. As a result, the ships were largely useless as warships apart from against similarly dated designs.

The six ships were deployed extensively on foreign stations throughout the 1880s and 1890s, usually to Germany's colonial holdings in Africa—Togoland, German South West Africa and German East Africa—and in the Pacific—German New Guinea and later the Jiaozhou Bay Leased Territory. They were frequently used to suppress local uprisings against German rule, punish those who attacked German citizens or businesses, and to show the flag. On several occasions, ships of the class were badly damaged in accidents—Marie running aground off New Mecklenburg and Sophie being rammed by a merchant vessel, both in 1884, and Olga being forced ashore by a cyclone in 1889—but none of the members of the class were lost. By the end of the 1890s, all of the ships had been removed from front line service and reduced to secondary roles, including training, accommodation, and fisheries protection duties. Most of the members of the class were broken up for scrap between 1906 and 1908, but Sophie remained in the navy's inventory as an accommodation ship until 1921, when she too was sent to the breaker's yard.

Summary of the Carola class
Ship	Armament	Displacement	Propulsion	Service		
Ship	Armament	Displacement	Propulsion	Laid down	Commissioned	Fate
Carola	10 × 15 cm guns	2,424 metric tons (2,386 long tons)	1 shaft, 1 double-expansion steam engine, 13.7 to 14 knots (25.4 to 25.9 km/h; 15.8 to 16.1 mph)	1879	1 September 1881	Broken up, 1906
Olga	10 × 15 cm guns	2,424 metric tons (2,386 long tons)	1 shaft, 1 double-expansion steam engine, 13.7 to 14 knots (25.4 to 25.9 km/h; 15.8 to 16.1 mph)	1879	9 January 1882	Broken up, 1908
Marie	10 × 15 cm guns	2,424 metric tons (2,386 long tons)	1 shaft, 1 double-expansion steam engine, 13.7 to 14 knots (25.4 to 25.9 km/h; 15.8 to 16.1 mph)	1880	1 May 1883	Broken up, 1907
Sophie	10 × 15 cm guns	2,424 metric tons (2,386 long tons)	1 shaft, 1 double-expansion steam engine, 13.7 to 14 knots (25.4 to 25.9 km/h; 15.8 to 16.1 mph)	January 1880	10 August 1882	Broken up, 1921
Alexandrine	10 × 15 cm guns	2,662 metric tons (2,620 long tons)	2 shafts, 2 double-expansion steam engines, 14.1 knots (26.1 km/h; 16.2 mph)	February 1882	6 October 1886	Broken up, 1907
Arcona	10 × 15 cm guns	2,662 metric tons (2,620 long tons)	2 shafts, 2 double-expansion steam engines, 14.1 knots (26.1 km/h; 16.2 mph)	1881	1 December 1886	Broken up, 1906

== Nixe ==
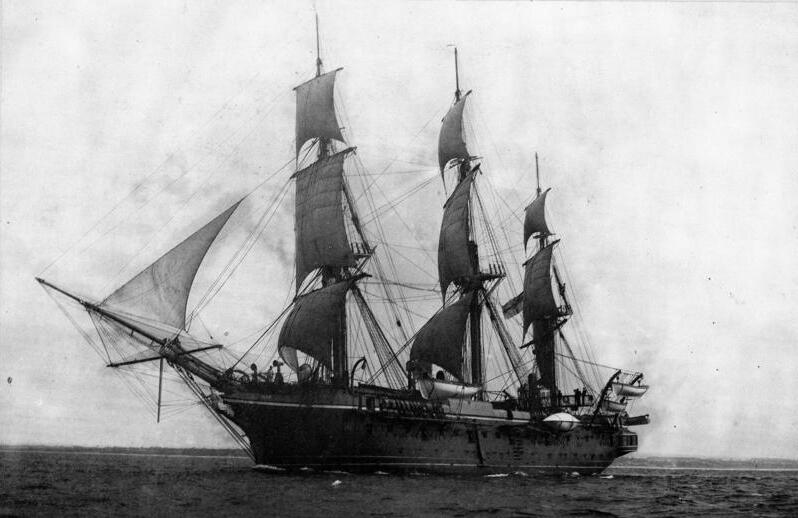
Nixe underway, c. 1892

The contract for Nixe was awarded in 1882 according to the 1873 fleet plan. The following year, General Leo von Caprivi replaced Stosch; Caprivi believed that all new cruising warships should be competent combat vessels, unlike many of the corvettes built under Stosch's direction. For his part, Stosch had preferred emphasizing long-range cruising abilities rather than combat power. Regardless, Caprivi, who was inexperienced in his new role, was unable to block the construction of the ship. Since she was essentially useless as a warship, she was completed as a training ship for naval cadets and apprentice seamen, a role she filled for nearly fifteen years. During this period, she went on overseas training cruises, frequently to South America, the West Indies, or the Mediterranean Sea. After being removed from active service in 1900, she was used as a headquarters ship for the High Seas Fleet from 1906 to 1910, when the Reichstag (Imperial Diet) cut funding for the vessel. She was stricken from the naval register in June 1911 and used as a barracks ship until April 1923, when she was renamed Hulk C and sold to a private shipping company. The firm converted her into a lighter in the midst of a severe lack of merchant vessels after World War I, and she was used in that role from 1925 to 1930 under her original name, when she was broken up.

Summary of the Nixe class
Ship	Armament	Displacement	Propulsion	Service		
Ship	Armament	Displacement	Propulsion	Laid down	Commissioned	Fate
Nixe	8 × 12.5 cm (4.9 in) guns	1,982 metric tons (1,951 long tons)	1 shaft, 1 marine steam engine, 10.4 knots (19.3 km/h; 12.0 mph)	August 1883	1 April 1886	Broken up, 1930

== Charlotte ==
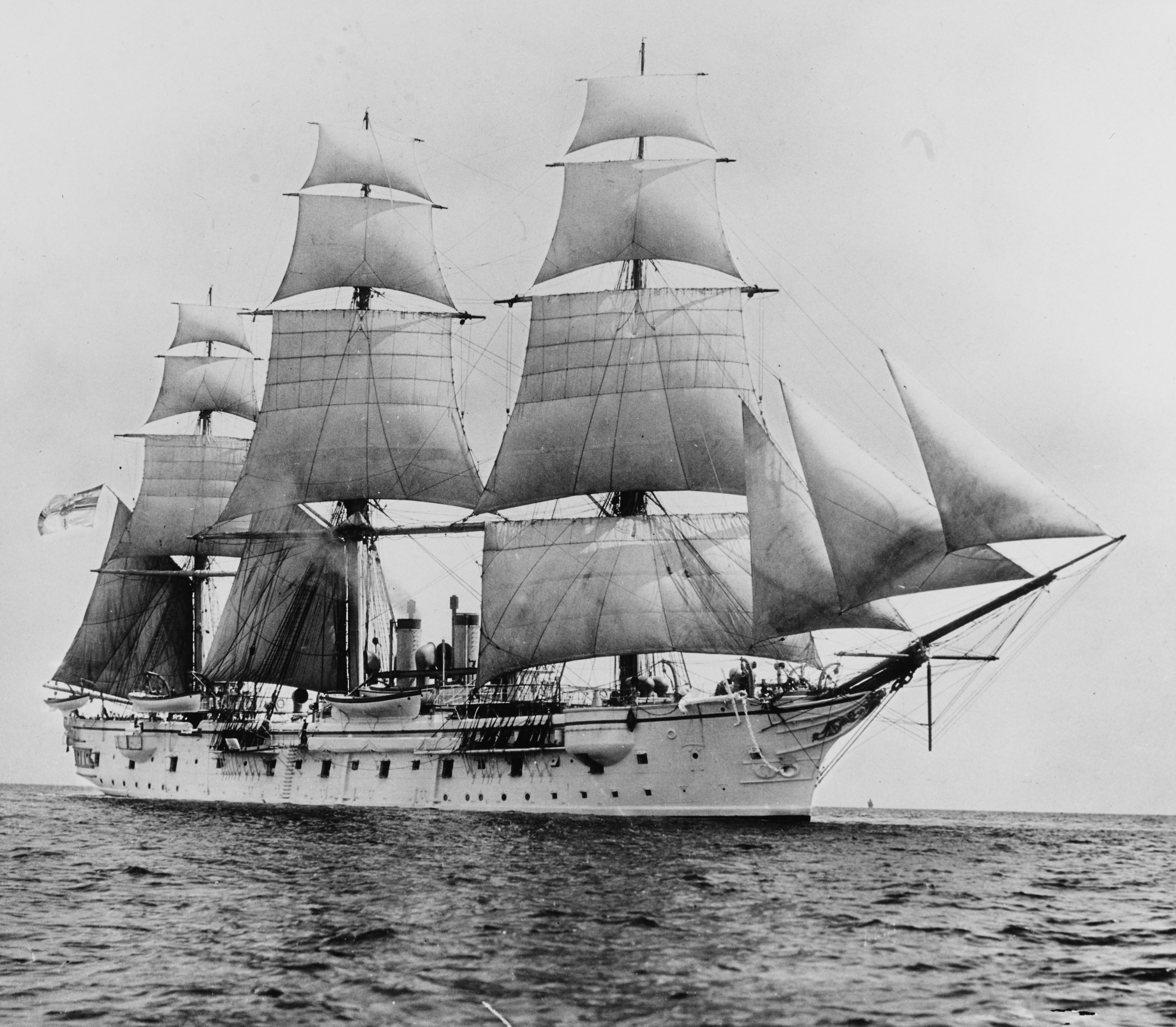
Charlotte underway

Charlotte was the last sailing ship of the German navy; she was authorized at the same time as Nixe, and like Nixe, she had little value as a warship. The sailing rig was retained in large part because the navy intended to use the ship for training and it still regarded sail training as important for ship crews. Charlotte was essentially a repeat of the Bismarck design, with a slightly greater displacement and heavier armament. Though Charlotte spent her career as a training ship, she was involved in international incidents while abroad, most notably the Lüders affair in Haiti in 1897 and the Venezuelan crisis of 1902–1903. In 1899, she was the first German warship to visit France after the Franco-Prussian War, a trip made to improve relations between the two countries. The ship remained in service until May 1909, when she was stricken from the naval register and thereafter converted into a barracks ship and tender for the training ship König Wilhelm. She served in these capacities to the outbreak of World War I in July 1914; in October, she was briefly reactivated, the only time in the history of the German navies that a vessel that had been stricken was re-commissioned. In November, she was again removed from service and returned to support König Wilhelm. In 1921, after the war, she was sold to a firm in Hamburg and hulked; her ultimate fate is unknown.

Summary of the Charlotte class
Ship	Armament	Displacement	Propulsion	Service		
Ship	Armament	Displacement	Propulsion	Laid down	Commissioned	Fate
Charlotte	18 × 15 cm guns	3,763 metric tons (3,704 long tons)	1 shaft, 2 marine steam engines, 13.5 knots	2 April 1883	1 November 1886	Sold, 1921
