= Germany–Haiti relations =

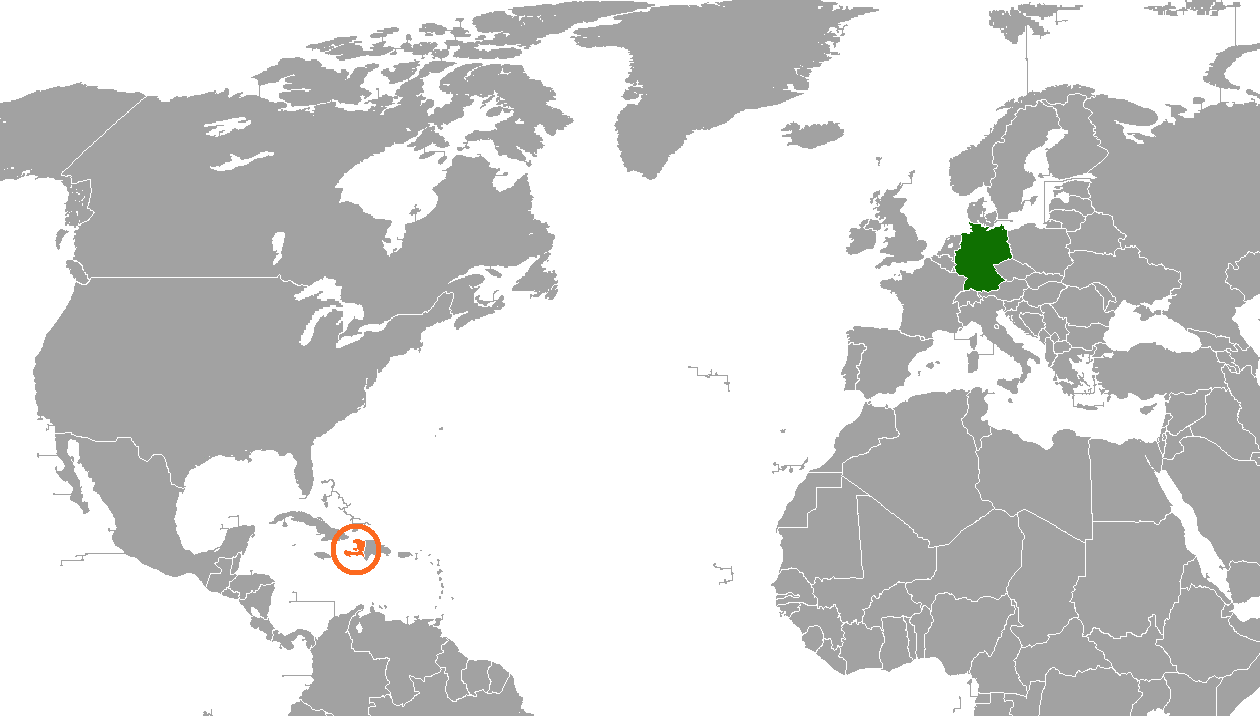

- Germany: Haiti

Germany–Haiti relations date back to the time before the country's independence. They were characterized by trade in the 19th century. In the 20th century, they lost importance due to political developments in both Germany and Haiti.

Diplomatic relations still exist, and both countries have exchanged ambassadors.

== History ==
The earliest known German settlement in the then French colony of Saint-Domingue was in the village of Bombardopolis, located south of the capital of the arrondissement of Môle-Saint-Nicholas in the département of Nord-Ouest. About a thousand German settlers came to Bombardopolis in the 18th century at the invitation of France to farm the land. However, since the region in the northwest is one of the most infertile parts of Haiti, the settlers left the colony after a short time for Guyana and Louisiana.

Among the French troops of General Charles Leclerc, who were to suppress the uprisings in the colony in 1802 and 1803 and were over 30,000 strong, were once again Germans, in addition to Dutch and Polish soldiers from the countries occupied by Napoleon Bonaparte. General Leclerc's intervention failed and Haiti declared independence on January 1, 1804. Haiti's second constitution of May 20, 1805, guaranteed full citizenship rights of the country to Germans and Poles residing in the country (Article 13).

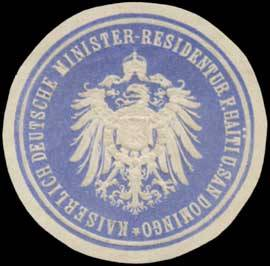
Seal Imperial German Minister Residency for Haiti and San Domingo

In the mid-19th century, merchants from the Hanseatic Cities of Hamburg, Bremen, and Lübeck began to open offices in Haiti and establish trade relations. Germany had no colonies of its own in the Caribbean. Trading houses used Haiti as a base because the country was open to foreign trade and there was little competition from other European countries. Germans sent to Haiti were willing to integrate into Haitian society. Some Germans married into Haiti's most prominent families. This allowed them to circumvent the constitutional prohibition on foreigners owning land.

Before the foundation of the German Empire in 1871, the independent Hanseatic cities and Prussia were represented in Haiti by so-called ministerial residents. The German Empire had been represented by consuls and envoys since the end of the 19th century. In 1891 Heinrich Ernst Göring took over the office of envoy.

In 1872, the German Empire sent gunboats for the first time to support interests of German merchants. To force payment of outstanding debts, the covered corvette SMS Vineta entered Port-au-Prince harbor. The SMS Vineta, supported by the SMS Gazelle, brought up two Haitian gunboats to make its presence felt. The so-called "Vineta Affair" led to nationwide protests in Haiti.

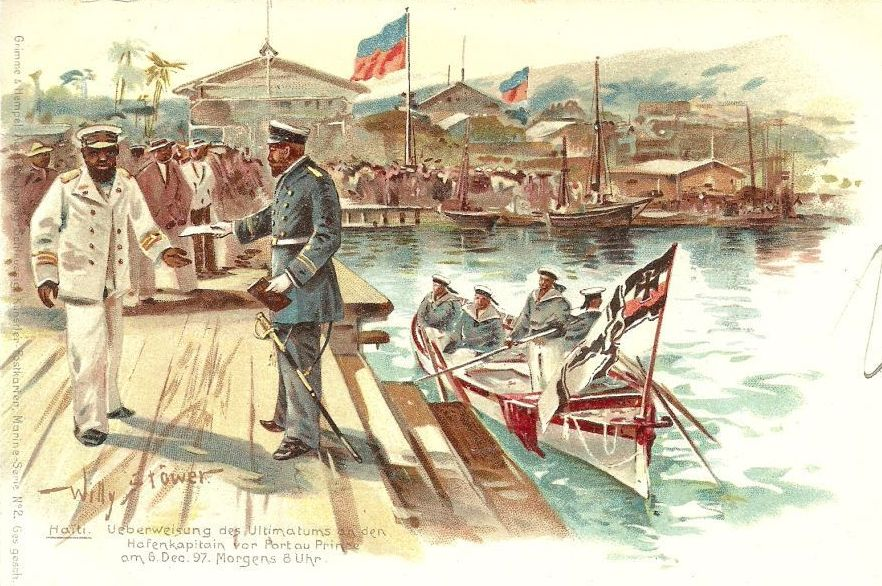
German Captain Thiele of the Charlotte handing over the German Ultimatum on 6 December 1897 during the Luders Affair.

In September 1897, the Lüders affair occurred, and its effects lingered for a long time. German merchant Emil Lüders was involved in a brawl with police in Port-au-Prince and sentenced to one year in prison. Count Schwerin, the imperial envoy at the time, interceded in Lüders' favor. He made an appearance at the Presidential Office and formally demanded that Lüders be released. President Simon-Sam refused. After mediation by the United States, Lüders was nonetheless released and able to leave Haiti. Despite this desired end to the affair, the cruiser corvette SMS Charlotte and the cruiser frigate SMS Stein docked in Port-au-Prince harbor in December 1897. The commander of the SMS Charlotte, demanded payment of $20,000 in damages to Lüders, permission for his re-entry into Haiti, an apology to the Imperial Government, and the firing of 21-gun salutes in honor of the national flag of the German Empire within an ultimatum of four hours. Unable to take action against the German warships, President Simon-Sam was ultimately forced to give in to the German demands. This deeply wounded Haitian national pride.

In September 1902, another incident occurred. HAPAG's Hamburg steamer Markomannia, which was operating on a liner service between the West Indies and Hamburg, was stopped at the Haitian port of Cap-Haïtien by the Haitian gunboat Crête-à-Pierrot, which was inspected for contraband. The commander of the Crête à Pierrot was an English mercenary named Read, he was under the command of the Haitian admiral of Scottish descent Hammerton Killick. Despite the protests of the captain and the German consul in Cap-Haïtien, arms and ammunition were seized and transferred to the Crête à Pierrot. The Markomannia was then able to continue her voyage. The gunboat SMS Panther was then ordered to bring up the Crête à Pierrot. This happened in the harbor of Gonaïves. When a prisenkommando crossed to the Crête à Pierrot, several explosions took place on board. The ship was taken under fire and sank to the bottom of the harbor basin.

In 1910, Germans in Haiti controlled about 80% of the country's foreign trade. Although the number of Germans living in Haiti was only about 200, they had a disproportionate amount of economic influence. For example, they owned and operated utilities in Port-au-Prince and Cap-Haïtien and controlled port operations in Port-au-Prince.

When the United States occupied Haiti during World War I in 1915, all Germans were interned and their property confiscated. In July 1918, occupied Haiti declared war on the German Empire. After the end of World War I, most Germans left Haiti due to the continued American occupation of the country and the resulting hostile atmosphere. The Germans who remained were those who had established family ties on the island.

When Haiti declared war on Germany in 1940 during World War II, all German property was again confiscated. German Haitians who retained their German citizenship were imprisoned. In 1942, at the request of the Americans, these interned Germans were transferred to the United States. It was not until 1946, when Dumarsais Estimé became President of Haiti, that the Germans then incarcerated at Ellis Island, New York City, were able to return to Haiti.

After the resumption of diplomatic relations, Kurt Luedde-Neurath became the first ambassador of the Federal Republic of Germany in Port-au-Prince in 1958. In the same year, Franck M. Beauvoir opened the Haitian Embassy in Bonn.

== Modern relations ==
After the earthquake near Port-au-Prince on January 12, 2010, German aid organizations provided humanitarian assistance on a large scale.

The German Minister for Economic Cooperation and Development, Dirk Niebel, visited Haiti in 2010, and German Foreign Minister Guido Westerwelle met with President Michel Martelly, among others, during a short visit in 2011.

== Trade ==
All imports from Haiti to Germany are duty-free and quota-free, with the exception of armaments, as part of the Everything but Arms initiative of the European Union.

== Culture ==
In Port-au-Prince, there is the German–Haitian Cultural Society, which offers language courses supported by the Goethe-Institut as well as events.

The Goethe-Institut Mexico is also regionally responsible for Haiti.

Exhibitions of Haitian painting are held in German museums and art halls.

In 1974, the Haitian national football team managed to qualify for the first time and was thus able to participate in the World Cup 1974 in West Germany. From 1976 to 1978 Josef Piontek was coach of the Haitian national team. They narrowly missed qualifying for the 1978 World Cup.

== Diplomatic missions ==
- Germany has an embassy in Port-au-Prince.
- Haiti has an embassy in Berlin.
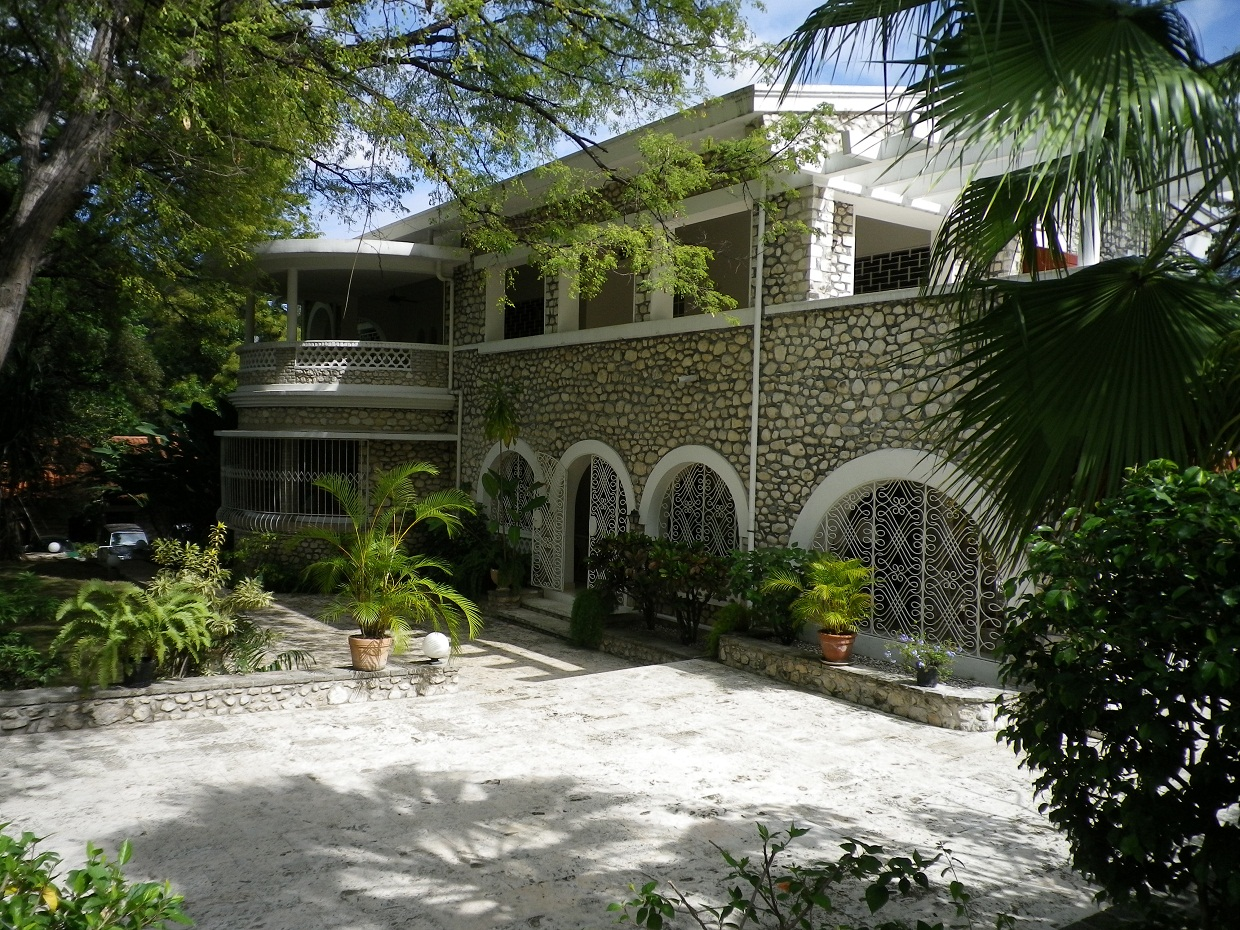
Residence of the Embassy of Germany in Port-au-Prince

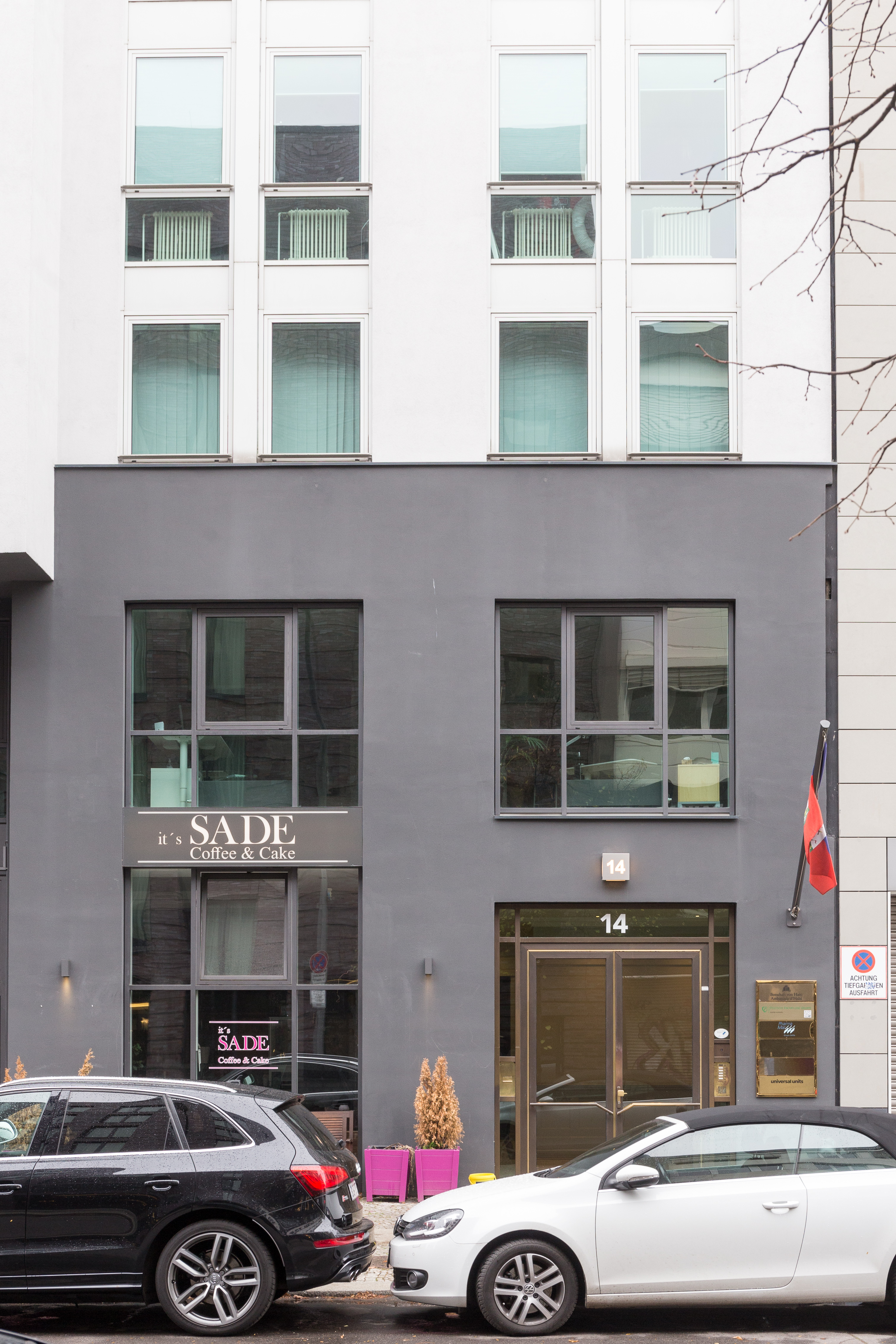
Embassy of Haiti in Berlin
