= Batsch affair =

The Batsch affair was an 1872 diplomatic incident between Haiti and Germany and an example of gunboat diplomacy.

During the Franco-Prussian War, the Haitians openly showed their sympathy for France, which displeased Germany. After Germany prevailed in the war, Captain Karl Ferdinand Batsch, of the frigate Vineta, arrived at Port-au-Prince on June 11, 1872, under the pretext of demanding the payment of £3,000 on behalf of two subjects of the German Empire. Without warning Batsch took possession of the two Haitian men-of-war, which, not expecting such an aggression, were lying at anchor in the harbor and unable to make the slightest resistance. Indignant at this attack, the Haitian people—in the words of poet Oswald Durand—"threw the money to the Germans as one would cast a bone to a dog." Batsch took the amount, gave back the two men-of-war, and left Port-au-Prince. But Germany's actions caused long-lived resentment.

== See also ==
- Lüders affair
