= Lüders affair =

1897 Haitian diplomatic incident

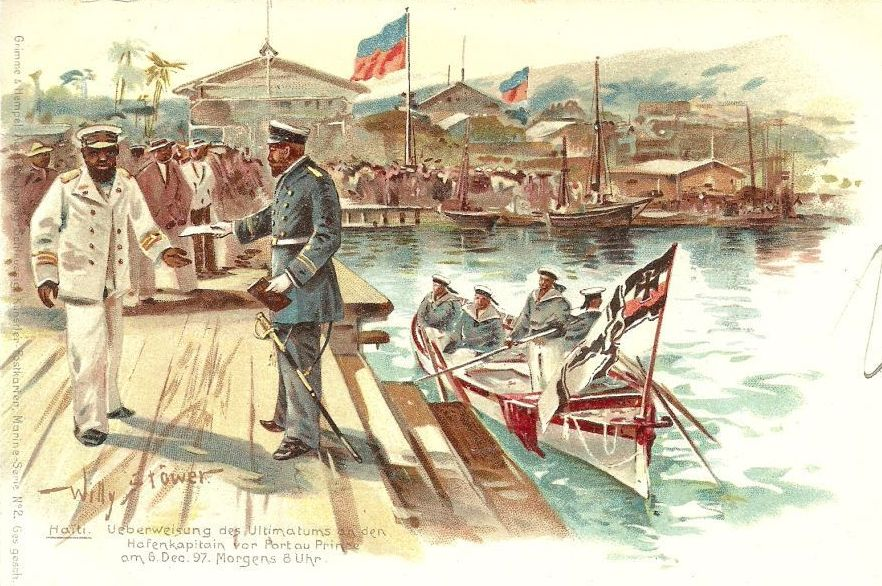
- A German postcard depicting August Carl Thiele delivering the German ultimatum
Date	December 6, 1897
Location	Port-au-Prince, Haiti
Result	German victory

Belligerents
Haiti	Germany

Commanders and leaders
Tirésias Simon Sam (surrendered)	August Carl Thiele

Strength
	Two warships: SMS Charlotte and SMS Stein

The Lüders affair was a diplomatic incident and military confrontation between Haiti and Germany in 1897. It arose from a dispute regarding a criminal case that involved a German citizen.

On September 21, 1897, Haitian police were looking for one Dorléus Présumé, who was accused of theft. They found him washing a coach in front of the "Écuries Centrales" (Central Stables) of Port-au-Prince. His employer was Emile Lüders. Présumé resisted arrest, and Lüders, who had heard the noise, came to his defence.

On the same day, both Présumé and Lüders were sentenced by the Police Tribunal to one month's imprisonment for assault and battery. They appealed to the Correctional Tribunal, but this time they were also charged with using force to resist arrest. The original sentence was annulled and on October 14 they were sentenced to one year's imprisonment.

Lüders had previously been sentenced to six days imprisonment in 1894 for battery on a soldier. Witnesses against Lüders included British, French, and German witnesses. Nonetheless, on October 17 the German Chargé d'affaires, Count Schwerin, demanded the immediate release of Lüders (who had been born in Haiti but had a German father), as well as the removal of the judges and dismissal of the police officers involved in the case. Responding to intervention by the American representative, W.F. Powell, President Sam pardoned Lüders, who left the country on October 22.

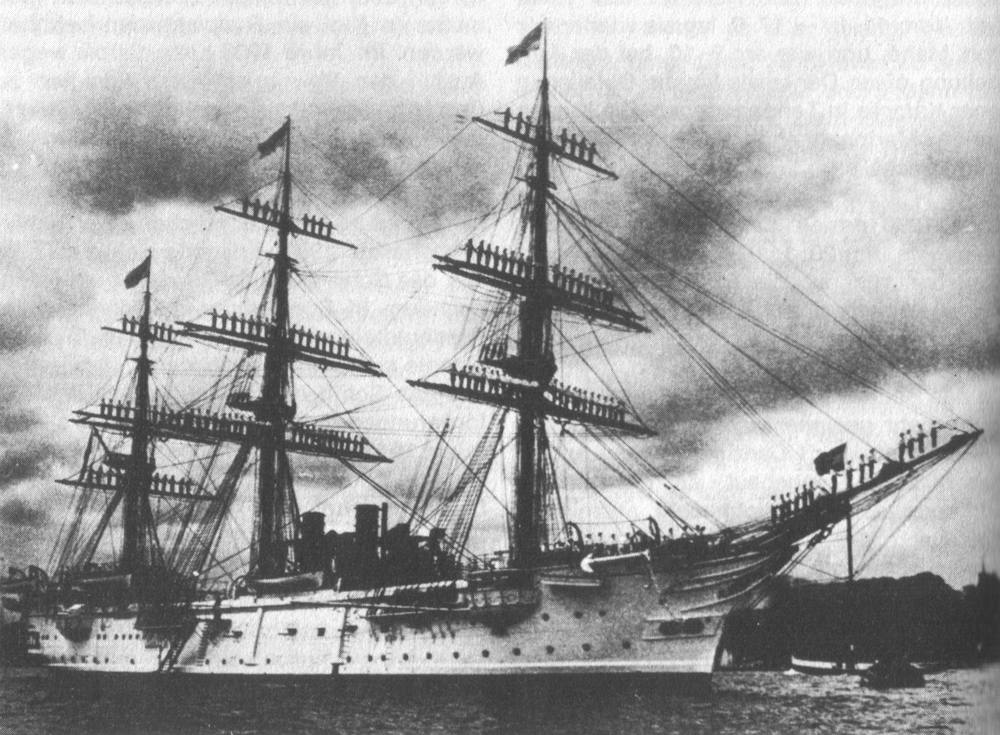
The German corvette SMS Charlotte with her crew

On December 6, 1897, two German warships, the screw corvettes SMS Charlotte and SMS Stein, anchored in the harbor of Port-au-Prince, without the usual salute, and Captain August Carl Thiele of Charlotte notified the Haitian government of an ultimatum whose conditions were humiliating in both form and substance: compensation in the amount of twenty thousand dollars for Lüders, a promise that Lüders could return to Haiti, a letter of apology to the German government, a 21-gun salute to the German flag, a reception for the German Chargé d'affaires, and four hours to decide. The President was required to raise a white flag on the presidential palace in token of surrender.

The Haitian government yielded, to the distress of its people, who had been prepared to defend their national honor. They were horrified to see the white flag, despite the protestations of the French ambassador, Théodore Meyer, that it was merely a parliamentary standard.

Solon Ménos, Foreign Minister of Haiti at the time, subsequently fought a duel with a member of Lüders' family and was the subject of an action for defamation by two German officials requiring him to append a statement to the end of his book on the Lüders affair.

The Lüders affair was extremely embarrassing for President Sam, and undermined his authority in Haiti, leading to his resignation in 1902.

== See also ==
- Batsch affair
- Rubalcava affair
- Germany–Haiti relations
