= SMS Charlotte =

Screw corvette of the German Imperial Navy

- Charlotte in 1897

Class overview
- Preceded by: Nixe
- Succeeded by: None

History

German Empire
- Name: Charlotte
- Namesake: Princess Charlotte of Prussia
- Builder: Kaiserliche Werft Wilhelmshaven
- Laid down: 2 April 1883
- Launched: 5 September 1885
- Commissioned: 1 November 1886
- Decommissioned: 26 May 1909
- Fate: Sold in 1921

General characteristics
- Type: Screw corvette
- Displacement: Full load: 3,763 t (3,704 long tons)
- Length: 83.85 m (275 ft 1 in) o/a
- Beam: 14.6 m (47 ft 11 in)
- Draft: 6.04–6.86 m (19 ft 10 in – 22 ft 6 in)
- Installed power: 8 × fire-tube boilers; 3,119 PS (2,294 kW; 3,076 ihp)
- Propulsion: 1 × screw propeller; 2 × marine steam engines
- Sail plan: 2,360 m^{2} (25,400 sq ft) full-rigged
- Speed: 13.5 knots (25.0 km/h; 15.5 mph)
- Range: 2,300 nmi (4,300 km; 2,600 mi) at 11 knots (20 km/h; 13 mph)
- Complement: 20 officers; 486 enlisted
- Armament: 18 × 15 cm (5.9 in) L/22 hoop guns; 2 × 8.8 cm (3.5 in) L/30 QF guns; 6 × 37 mm (1.5 in) L/37 guns

SMS Charlotte was a German screw corvette built for the Kaiserliche Marine (Imperial Navy) in the 1880s, being laid down in April 1883, launched in September 1885, and commissioned in November 1886. The only vessel of her class, Charlotte was the last sailing warship built for the German navy. She was armed with a battery of eighteen 15 cm (5.9 in) guns.

Charlotte spent her career as a training ship, responsible for the training of naval cadets and apprentice seamen. This duty frequently took the ship on overseas cruises, and on one such cruise in 1897, she and the corvette Stein participated in the Lüders affair, a diplomatic humiliation of Haiti over the arrest and jailing of a German national. Charlotte also took part in other diplomatic initiatives, including in 1899 the first visit of a German warship to French ports since the Franco-Prussian War.

The ship remained in service until May 1909, when she was stricken from the naval register and thereafter converted into a barracks ship and tender. She served in these capacities to the outbreak of World War I in July 1914; in August, she was briefly reactivated, the only time in the history of the German navies that a vessel that had been stricken was re-commissioned. In October, she was again removed from service and returned to barracks ship duties. In 1921, after the war, she was sold to a firm in Hamburg and hulked; her ultimate fate is unknown.

== Design ==
After the Franco-Prussian War of 1870–1871, the Kaiserliche Marine began an expansion program to strengthen the fleet to meet the demands imposed by Germany's increased economic activities abroad and to prepare it for a potential future conflict with France. Through the mid and late 1870s, the German fleet ordered twelve corvettes of the Bismarck and Carola classes; these vessels had limited combat capabilities, emphasizing long range cruising rather than engaging hostile cruisers. This program began under the direction of General Albrecht von Stosch, the chief of the Kaiserliche Admiralität (Imperial Admiralty); he was replaced in 1883 by General Leo von Caprivi. Caprivi believed that all new cruisers should have a more balanced design that placed greater emphasis on combat power. Nevertheless, he authorized two new corvettes that were laid down in 1883, Charlotte and a smaller vessel, Nixe.

The design for Charlotte had been prepared in 1881–1882, essentially as a repeat of the Bismarck design, though she was slightly larger and carried a heavier armament. Due to the time the ship was built, a transitional period between traditional sail-powered ships armed with slow-firing breech-loading guns and modern cruisers armed with quick-firing guns and powered solely with steam engines, Charlotte emerged as an anachronism compared to contemporary cruising vessels in other fleets. But the German navy still placed an emphasis on training its sailors to use sails, so the full rigging was retained, making Charlotte the last vessel of the Kaiserliche Marine to be equipped with a sailing rig. In addition, despite Caprivi's insistence that new cruisers should be capable of combat, Charlotte was designed with the role as a training ship in mind, which was better suited to the characteristics of the earlier corvettes.

=== Characteristics ===
Charlotte was 76.85 meters (252 ft 2 in) long at the waterline and 83.85 meters (275 ft 1 in) long overall. She had a beam of 14.6 m (47 ft 11 in) and a draft of 6.04 m (19 ft 10 in) forward and 6.86 to 6.3 m (22 ft 6 in to 20 ft 8 in). She displaced 3,288 metric tons (3,236 long tons) normally and up to 3,763 t (3,704 long tons) at full load. The ship's hull was constructed with transverse iron frames with one layer of wood planks, which were sheathed with Muntz metal to prevent biofouling on extended cruises abroad, where shipyard facilities were not readily available. She had a double bottom below the engine room and her hull was divided into ten watertight compartments.

The ship's crew consisted of 20 officers and 486 enlisted men, though as a training ship later in her career, her complement amounted to 20 officers and 475 sailors, of whom 50 were naval cadets and 230 were Schiffsjungen (apprentice seamen). She carried a variety of small boats, including one picket boat, two launches, six cutters, one yawl, and one dinghy. Steering was controlled with a single rudder. The vessel was a good sea boat, but she made bad leeway in even mild winds and she was difficult to maneuver. She lost a significant amount of speed in a head sea, and she had limited performance under sail.

=== Machinery ===
Illustration of Charlotte underway

The ship was powered by a pair of 2-cylinder marine steam engines that were coupled together driving a single shaft with one 2-bladed screw propeller. Steam was provided by eight coal-fired fire-tube boilers, which were ducted into two retractable funnels. The ship had a top speed of 13.5 knots (25.0 km/h; 15.5 mph) at 3,119 metric horsepower (3,076 ihp). Coal storage amounted to 528 t (520 long tons). She had a cruising radius of 2,300 nautical miles (4,300 km; 2,600 mi) at a speed of 11 knots (20 km/h; 13 mph), though this fell to 2,200 nmi (4,100 km; 2,500 mi) at 13 knots (24 km/h; 15 mph). As built, Charlotte was equipped with a full ship rig to supplement their steam engines on overseas cruising missions, but this was later reduced to a barque rig.

In 1903–1905, Charlotte was modernized, which involved the removal of the second engine and two of the boilers. The remaining six boilers were replaced with newer equipment. This reduced her speed to 11.4 knots (21.1 km/h; 13.1 mph) from 1,473 PS (1,453 ihp), though her cruising range was increased to 4,000 nmi (7,400 km; 4,600 mi) at her maximum speed.

=== Armament ===
Charlotte was armed with a battery of eighteen 15 cm (5.9 in) L/22 breech-loading hoop guns, six of which were later removed in 1899; these were supplied with a total of 1868 shells for her guns. These guns had a range of 5,500 m (18,000 ft). She also had two 8.8 cm (3.5 in) SK L/30 quick-firing guns and six 37 mm (1.5 in) Hotchkiss revolver cannon. In 1899, her secondary armament was revised to a pair of 10.5 cm (4.1 in) SK L/35 guns, sixteen of the 8.8 cm SK L/30 guns and four of the Hotchkiss cannon.

== Service history ==
=== Construction ===
The keel for Charlotte was laid down on 2 April 1883 at the Kaiserliche Werft (Imperial Shipyard) in Wilhelmshaven, under the contract name Ersatz Victoria, as a replacement for the older corvette. (Note: German warships were ordered under provisional names. Additions to the fleet were given a single letter; ships intended to replace older or lost vessels were ordered as "Ersatz (name of the ship to be replaced)".) She was launched on 5 September 1885; this was delayed significantly by budget cuts from the Reichstag (Imperial Diet). At her launching ceremony, then-prince Wilhelm christened the ship for his sister, Princess Charlotte. The corvette was commissioned on 1 November 1886 and she began sea trials, which ended on 28 January 1887, though she remained out of service for more than a year.

=== 1888–1898 ===
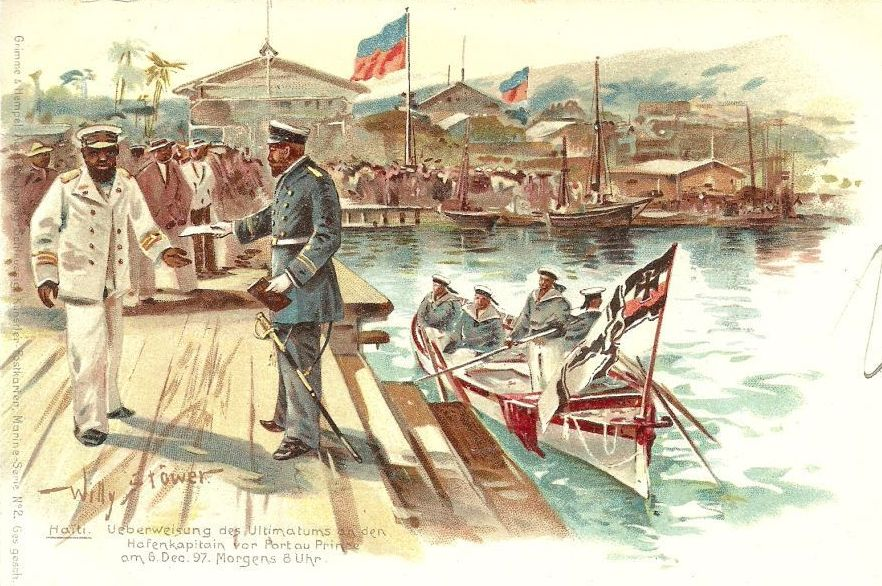
Thiele during the Lüders affair

Charlotte was commissioned for active service on 22 September 1888 to replace the corvette Prinz Adalbert, which was in need of repair. Charlotte took her place in the Training Squadron, and she took aboard her first contingent of 50 cadets and 230 Schiffsjungen from the 1887 crew year. She joined the rest of the Squadron for a training cruise to the Mediterranean Sea, leaving Wilhelmshaven on 29 September. While on the cruise, Charlotte participated in a celebration commemorating the 25th anniversary of King George I of Greece from 27 October to 5 November in Piraeus. The ships of the squadron also visited ports in Austria-Hungary, Italy, and in the Levant in the course of their voyage. They arrived back in Kiel, Germany on 16 April 1889, after which Charlotte moved to Wilhelmshaven, where she was decommissioned on 25 April. She underwent an overhaul and then remained in reserve for nearly a decade.

On 22 April 1897, Charlotte was reactivated for additional training duties. She took part in training exercises in the Baltic Sea before joining the main fleet to accompany now-Kaiser Wilhelm II's yacht, Hohenzollern on a visit to Kronstadt, Russia, where he met Czar Nicholas II in early August. Later that month, Charlotte took part in the annual fleet training exercises. She embarked on a cruise to Central America on 16 September. While in Charlotte Amalie in St. Thomas, Charlotte met the corvette Stein on 29 September; both ships were ordered to Port-au-Prince, Haiti, where a German national, Lüders, had been arrested and sent to prison. Since the Haitian government refused demands for his release from the German ambassador, the two corvettes were sent to secure Lüders's release, resulting in the Lüders affair.

Charlotte and Stein arrived on 6 December, where Charlotte's commander, August Carl Thiele, issued an ultimatum to pay an indemnity of 20,000 dollars, suspend Lüders's conviction, and protect him while he was still in the country, to be completed within thirteen hours. The Haitian government refused the demands, so Charlotte and Stein went to battle stations and prepared to open fire on the Haitian naval vessels in the port, the fortress protecting the harbor, and the Government Palace in Haiti. After the German ships fired a warning shot, the Haitian government acquiesced, though it requested an extension of two hours to arrange the payment of the indemnity. To gain leverage to secure the payment, German sailors went aboard the three Haitian naval vessels in the port to neutralize them. Once the terms of the ultimatum were fulfilled, the German commanders went ashore to make a formal visit to the government, and on their departure, the Germans fired salutes as a sign of good will. The United States informed the German government that it would take action against the German corvettes if they made further demands on Haiti or attempted to annex the country, but the issue came to nothing. Charlotte left the West Indies on 10 January 1898, having been replaced by the unprotected cruiser Geier.

=== 1898–1903 ===
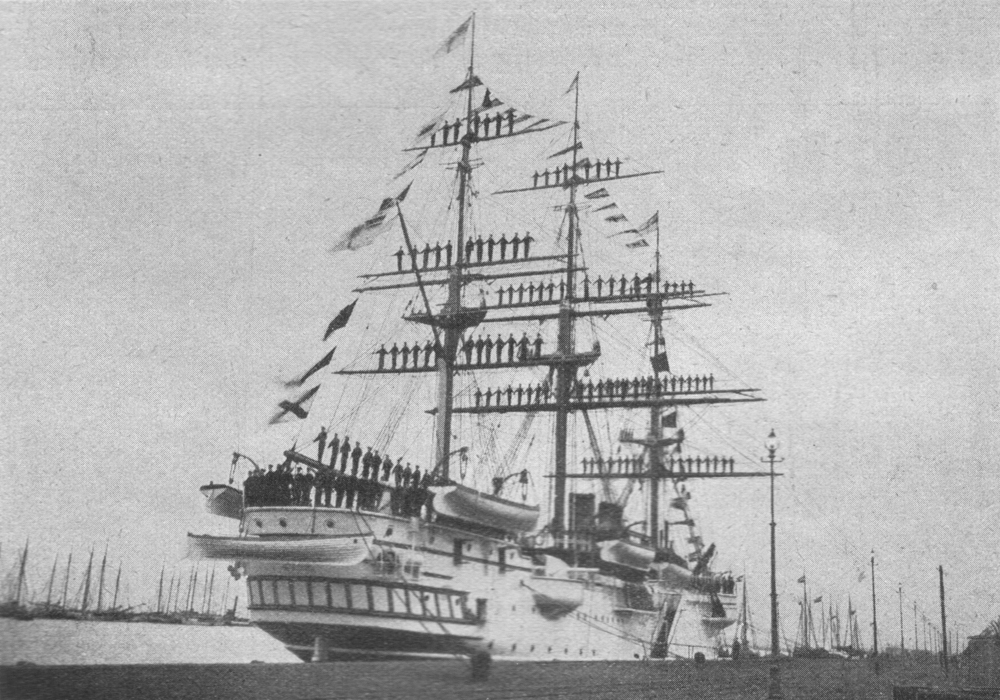
Charlotte, c. 1902

After arriving back in Germany, Charlotte underwent an overhaul, which was completed on 31 May. Her training activities were interrupted by an outbreak of measles among the cadets and Schiffsjungen, which lasted until early July when she began a cruise in the Baltic. In August, she joined the temporarily formed V Division for the annual fleet exercises. Charlotte embarked on another major training cruise on 8 September in company with the corvette Stosch. They visited several islands in the Atlantic before proceeding to Tangier, Morocco in January 1899, since civil disturbances in the country threatened German interests. There, they forced the Moroccan government to pay an indemnity it had agreed to pay and then delayed repeatedly. At the time, Franco-British relations had soured, leading to a rapprochement between France and Germany, the first time relations between the two countries had thawed since the Franco-Prussian War of 1870–1871. In a show of good will, Charlotte and Stosch were sent to visit French ports in North Africa, including Oran, Algiers, and Tunis, where they received a friendly welcome. The ships then visited Spanish cities before returning to Germany; Charlotte arrived in Kiel on 23 March.

Charlotte then went into the shipyard for a modernization that included a revision of her armament. She then went on a short cruise in the Baltic before beginning the next overseas training cruise in July. This trip went to the southern Atlantic Ocean, as far south as Rio de Janeiro, and she arrived back in Kiel on 23 March 1900. The ship made two short cruises in the Baltic and to Norway in May and September, respectively, before beginning the year's major cruise to the Mediterranean on 18 September. This trip included stops in Moroccan ports and Alexandria, Egypt. While in Corfu on 17 December, Charlotte was ordered to steam to Málaga, where the corvette Gneisenau had been wrecked in a gale. Charlotte arrived on 22 December, along with the British ironclad HMS Devastation, which helped to remove the remains of crewmen who had been killed in the accident and salvage valuable equipment. This work lasted until 12 January 1901, after which Charlotte left to transport the German ambassador to Morocco from Mogador to Tangier. She then visited ports in Italy before returning to Kiel on 9 March.

The ship had another overhaul in March and returned to service on 18 April and embarked cadets from the 1901 crew year, which included Price Adalbert, the Kaiser's son. Charlotte participated in a survey of the Adlergrund in the aftermath of the grounding of the pre-dreadnought battleship Kaiser Friedrich III, which had been badly damaged in the accident. Charlotte then went on a cruise to Kronstadt, followed by another cruise to the Mediterranean on 14 August. During the voyage, she stopped in Piraeus, Constantinople, and Trieste, before arriving back in Kiel on 16 March 1902. After another overhaul, she went on a training cruise in the Baltic from 12 May to 12 July before starting another major cruise to South American waters. She visited Brazil and Uruguay before being recalled to Venezuela late in the year during the Venezuelan crisis of 1902–1903; she did not take an active role in the conflict and she was used to support the more modern German warships in the East American Cruiser Division. She was detached from the unit on 19 January 1903 and sent home, arriving in Kiel on 23 March.

=== 1903–1920 ===
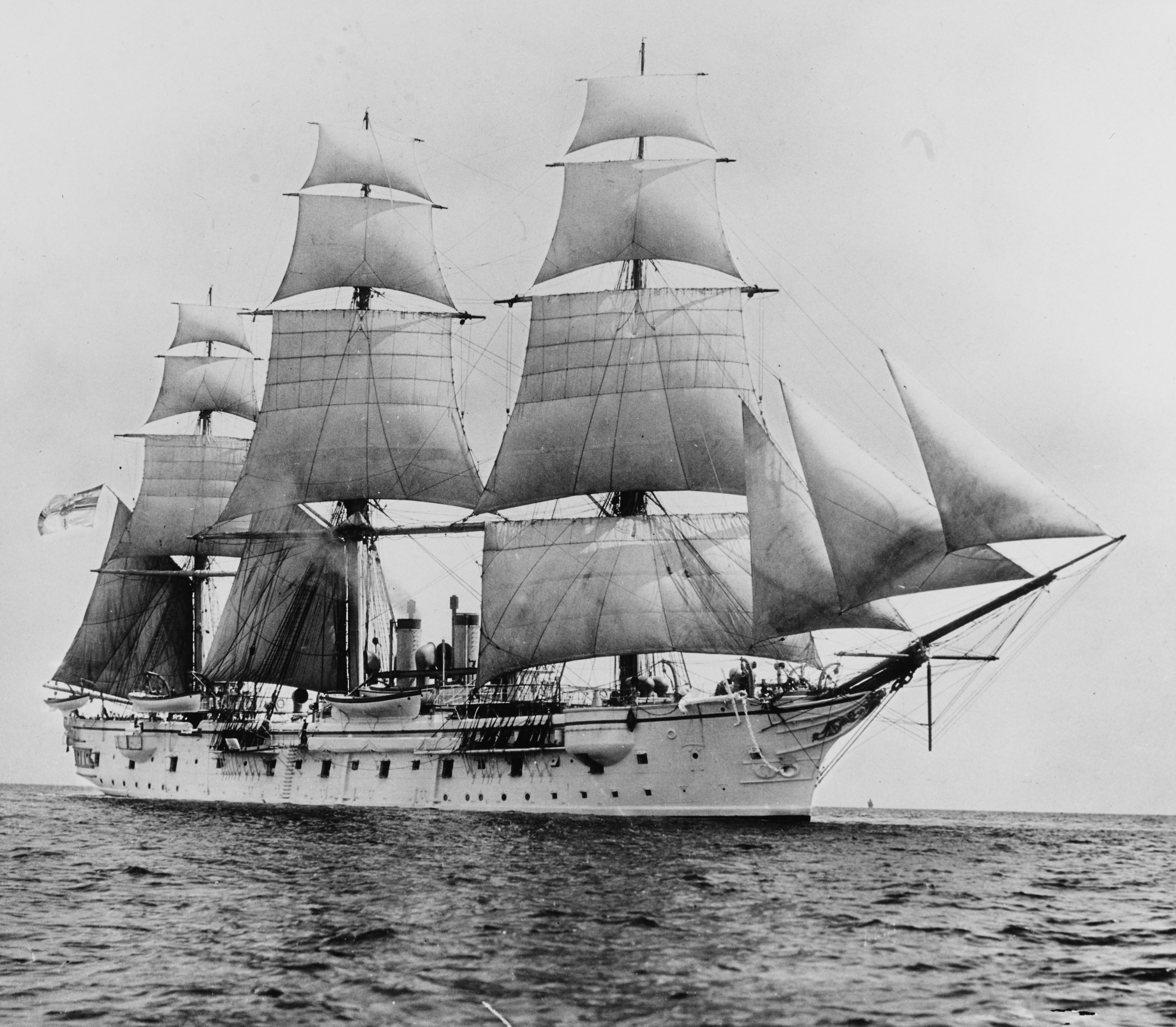
Charlotte underway

In addition to periodic maintenance, additional modernization work was carried out beginning in early 1903, including the installation of new boilers, the removal of the rest of the 15 cm guns, and the reduction of her sailing rig. Charlotte returned to service on 1 April 1905, and she began an overseas cruise on 18 July, first visiting Scotland and then cruising in the Atlantic and stopping in Mogador, before entering the Mediterranean. The cruise ended on 30 March 1906 in Kiel, and the cruise of 1906 followed a similar to the 1905 voyage. During this trip, she took part in a memorial service in Málaga in remembrance of those killed in the sinking of Gneisenau. Charlotte arrived back in Kiel on 23 March 1907; the rest of the year was filled with a long cruise in the Baltic and another major voyage to the West Indies that lasted until 16 March 1908. The 1908–1909 cruise also went to the West Indies, during which her crew helped suppress a fire in Santiago de Cuba. Charlotte, the last sailing ship of the Kaiserliche Marine was decommissioned on 31 March 1909 in Kiel.

Charlotte was stricken from the naval register on 26 May 1909 and converted into a barracks ship and tender for the old ironclad König Wilhelm, which was used as a training ship for cadets, beginning in 1910. Following the outbreak of World War I and the general mobilization of forces in 1914, Charlotte was reinstated into the Navy List under the command of Andreas Fischer on 20 October, to replace König Wilhelm, which had been redeployed as a depot ship in the Elbe; this was the first and only time a warship of the Kaiserliche Marine that had been stricken from the register was replaced on it. This proved to be short-lived, and the naval command ordered that Charlotte be stricken once again on 4 November, when König Wilhelm returned. In 1917, Charlotte was replaced as König Wilhelm's tender by the light cruiser Medusa. Charlotte was sold to a private company in Hamburg in 1921 and was subsequently used as a storage hulk. Her ultimate fate is unknown.
