= SMS Nixe =

Screw corvette of the German Imperial Navy

- Nixe in 1899

Class overview
- Preceded by: Carola class
- Succeeded by: Charlotte

History

German Empire
- Name: Nixe
- Namesake: Nixe
- Ordered: August 1882
- Builder: Kaiserliche Werft Danzig
- Laid down: August 1883
- Launched: 23 July 1885
- Commissioned: 1 April 1886
- Decommissioned: 18 May 1910
- Stricken: 24 June 1911
- Fate: Sold, 1 April 1923 and converted into a lighter, broken up in 1930

General characteristics
- Type: Screw corvette
- Displacement: Full load: 1,982 t (1,951 long tons)
- Length: 63.3 meters (207 ft 8 in) (loa)
- Beam: 13.2 m (43 ft 4 in)
- Draft: 5.52 m (18 ft 1 in)
- Installed power: 2 × fire-tube boilers; 724 PS (714 ihp)
- Propulsion: 1 × marine steam engine; 1 × propeller
- Sail plan: Full ship rig
- Speed: 10.4 knots (19.3 km/h; 12.0 mph)
- Range: 1,480 nautical miles (2,740 km; 1,700 mi) at 8 kn (15 km/h; 9.2 mph)
- Crew: 27 officers; 331 sailors
- Armament: 8 × 12.5 cm (4.9 in) guns; 2 × 8.8 cm (3.5 in) guns; 4 × 37 mm (1.5 in) Hotchkiss revolver cannons

SMS Nixe was a screw corvette built for the German Kaiserliche Marine (Imperial Navy) in the 1880s. She was laid down in August 1883, launched in July 1885, and commissioned into the fleet in April 1886. Hopelessly out of date even by the time she was ordered in 1882 and possessing insufficient gun power or speed, she was nevertheless completed as designed. In addition to those shortcomings, she proved to be difficult to handle in service and was particularly affected by wind.

Nixe served as a training ship for naval cadets and apprentice seamen for nearly fifteen years. During this period, she went on overseas training cruises, frequently to South America, the West Indies, or the Mediterranean Sea. She was used as a headquarters ship for the High Seas Fleet from 1906 to 1910, when the Reichstag cut funding for the vessel. She was stricken from the naval register in June 1911 and used as a barracks ship until April 1923, when she was renamed Hulk C and sold to a private shipping company, which converted her into a lighter and used in that role from 1925 to 1930 under her original name, when she was broken up.

== Design ==
After the Franco-Prussian War of 1870–1871, the Kaiserliche Marine began an expansion program to strengthen the fleet to meet the demands imposed by Germany's increased economic activities abroad and to prepare it for a potential future conflict with France. Through the mid and late 1870s, the German fleet ordered twelve corvettes of the Bismarck and Carola classes; these vessels had limited combat capabilities, emphasizing long range cruising rather than engaging hostile cruisers. This program began under the direction of General Albrecht von Stosch, the chief of the Kaiserliche Admiralität (Imperial Admiralty); the contract to build a new corvette, Nixe, was awarded in August 1882. Stosch was replaced in 1883 by General Leo von Caprivi. Caprivi believed that all new cruisers should have a more balanced design that placed greater emphasis on combat power.

Though the ships of the Carola class had not yet been completed, the Admiralität was bound by the fleet plan that had been adopted in 1873, and so despite Caprivi's preferences, construction of Nixe and the similar but larger corvette Charlotte went ahead. Nixe in particular had an insufficiently powerful propulsion system and a too weak battery of guns, leaving her essentially useless as a combat vessel. The historians Hans Hildebrand, Albert Röhr, and Hans-Otto Steinmetz stated that "why no one objected to the building of this ship cannot be determined from the record." They suggested that Caprivi's inexperience, since he had just replaced Stosch, contributed to the decision to allow construction to proceed. They also argued that inconclusive debates in the Reichstag (Imperial Diet) over the needs of the navy pressured the Admiralität into adhering to the plan despite the obvious shortcomings of the design.

=== Characteristics ===
Nixe was 54.35 meters (178 ft 4 in) long at the waterline and 63.3 meters (207 ft 8 in) long overall. She had a beam of 13.2 m (43 ft 4 in) and a draft of 5.52 m (18 ft 1 in) forward and 6.36 m (20 ft 10 in). She displaced 1,781 metric tons (1,753 long tons) as designed and up to 1,982 t (1,951 long tons) at full load. The ship's hull was constructed with transverse iron frames with one layer of wood planks, which were sheathed with copper to prevent biofouling on extended cruises abroad, where shipyard facilities were not readily available. Her hull was divided into nine watertight compartments.

The ship's crew consisted of 27 officers and 331 enlisted men, though as a training ship later in her career, her complement amounted to 17 officers and 354 sailors, of whom 125 were naval cadets. She carried a variety of small boats, including one picket boat, one launch, three (later two) cutters, two yawls, and two (later one) dinghies. Steering was controlled with a single rudder. The vessel was a very poor sea boat, and yawed badly when running before the wind; without her sails, the rudder had to be kept at 5–10 degrees to the leeward side to keep the ship on a straight course. She also lost significant speed in a head sea.

=== Machinery ===
The ship was powered by a 2-cylinder marine steam engine that drove a single shaft with one 2-bladed screw propeller. Steam was provided by two coal-fired fire-tube boilers, which were ducted into a retractable funnel. The ship was designed for a top speed of 9 knots (17 km/h; 10 mph) at 700 metric horsepower (690 ihp), though she reached 10.4 knots (19.3 km/h; 12.0 mph) at 724 PS (714 ihp) on speed trials. Coal storage amounted to 125 t (123 long tons). She had a cruising radius of 1,480 nautical miles (2,740 km; 1,700 mi) at a speed of 8 knots (15 km/h; 9.2 mph), though this fell to 1,120 nmi (2,070 km; 1,290 mi) at 10 knots (19 km/h; 12 mph). As built, Nixe was equipped with a full ship rig to supplement their steam engines on overseas cruising missions, though this was later reduced.

=== Armament ===
Nixe was armed with a battery of eight 12.5 cm (4.9 in) L/23 breech-loading guns, two of which were later removed; these were supplied with a total of 800 shells. These guns had a range of 5,000 m (16,000 ft). Later in her career, two 8.8 cm (3.5 in) SK L/30 quick-firing guns and four 37 mm (1.5 in) Hotchkiss revolver cannon were added. The two 8.8 cm guns were given a total of 300 shells.

== Service history ==
=== Construction – 1894 ===
Nixe moored to a buoy

Nixe was laid down at the Kaiserliche Werft (Imperial Shipyard) in Danzig in August 1883 under the contract name Ersatz Medusa as a replacement for the old corvette. (Note: German warships were ordered under provisional names. Additions to the fleet were given a single letter; ships intended to replace older or lost vessels were ordered as "Ersatz (name of the ship to be replaced)".) She was launched on 23 July 1885 and at the launching ceremony, the director of the shipyard, Konteradmiral (Rear Admiral) Johann-Heinrich Pirner christened the ship after the Nixe water spirits of German mythology. She was commissioned on 1 April 1886 and began sea trials. She then went into the Kaiserliche Werft in Kiel, where she was fitted out as a training ship for naval cadets and Schiffsjungen (apprentice seamen). Nixe went on her first cruise with a contingent of Schiffsjungen from 17 to 31 May.

Nixe began her first major overseas cruise on 15 June, which went to South and Central America. She first visited Bahía Blanca and then toured the West Indies. While in St. Thomas, she joined the Training Squadron and left with the rest of the ships to return to Germany on 3 February 1887. They stopped in Queenstown, Ireland on 4 March, where Nixe left the Training Squadron to proceed independently, stopping in Lisbon, Portugal and Gibraltar before finally arriving back in Kiel on 25 July. She took part in the annual fleet maneuvers from 6 to 28 August in the Bay of Danzig and then served as the guard ship in Wilhelmshaven for the Marinestation der Nordsee (North Sea Naval Station) from 17 September 1887 to 17 April 1888.

Nixe resumed training duties in April, first with short cruises in the Baltic Sea. On 4 June, she embarked on her next major cruise to visit the West Indies and ports in Canada, arriving back in Kiel on 9 September 1889. She was decommissioned on 30 September and then recommissioned on 9 April 1890. The ship conducted more Baltic training cruises until 10 June, when she went on another cruise to the West Indies; during this voyage, she visited ports in Venezuela and Norfolk, Virginia in the United States. She reached Kiel on 25 August 1891 and immediately joined the fleet maneuvers, which lasted until 18 September.

The next year's training program began on 1 April 1892, and it followed the same pattern as the previous year, but the overseas cruise instead went to the Mediterranean Sea. During this trip, the crew suffered an outbreak of typhoid. The annual fleet maneuvers followed her return in early September, after which she began the winter training cruise on 23 September, again to the West Indies. This was the first such voyage that Nixe carried a group of cadets from the Marineschule (Naval School). On her return to Germany on 15 March 1894, Nixe was decommissioned for a modernization at the Kaiserliche Werft in Danzig.

=== 1897–1930 ===
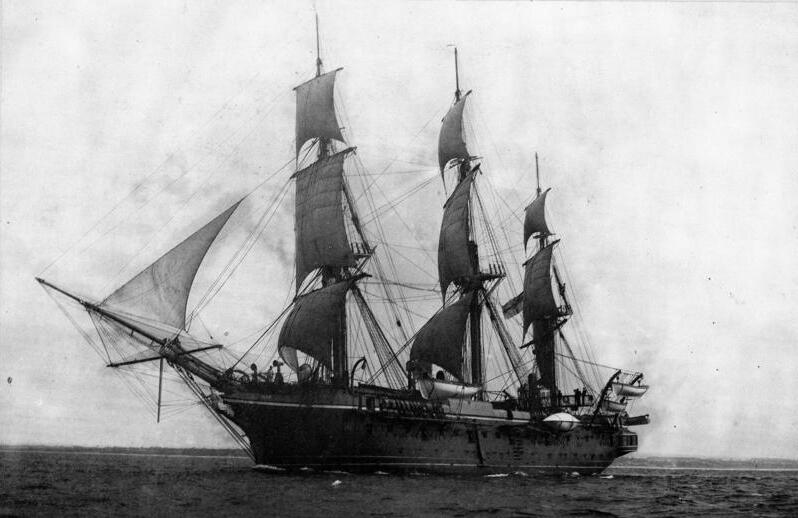
Nixe underway, c. 1892

Nixe returned to service on 1 April 1897; in late September she began the winter training cruise to the West Indies, and while on the return voyage, she was diverted to Kamerun to participate in the funeral ceremonies for the funeral of Ndumbe Lobe Bell, the pro-German leader of the Duala people, on 12 December. Nixe left Kamerun on 12 January 1898 and arrived in Kiel on 19 March, after which she underwent periodic maintenance. The ship went on training cruises in the Baltic, and on 15 August she began the next overseas cruise, which went to South America, including stops in Brazil and Argentina. While in São Francisco do Sul, Brazil, a portion of her crew visited the German enclave in Joinville. Nixe reached Kiel on 1 April 1899 and went into the shipyard for another overhaul.

After returning to service, Nixe started the next major training cruise in mid-May, which again went to the West Indies. While in the Caribbean Sea, a revolution broke out in Venezuela, prompting the German government to order Nixe to visit the ports of La Guaira and Puerto Cabello to protect German interests from the violence. On 6 November, she was replaced by the corvettes Stosch and Moltke, allowing Nixe to resume her training duties before returning to Kiel on 26 March 1900. She began the year's training program on 25 May with a short cruise to Vlissingen, the Netherlands from 31 May to 6 June.

She then went on a training cruise to visit St. Petersburg, Russia. On returning from the trip, she was decommissioned to free her crew for other purposes, as the navy was facing a shortage owing to the expedition to China to participate in the suppression of the Boxer Uprising. The navy had planned to modernize the ship in 1901, but the loss of the corvette Gneisenau off Málaga forced the Admiralität to reduce the modernization to a simple reduction in her rigging. She was not recommissioned until 1 November 1906, however, and she was used only as a headquarters ship for the High Seas Fleet.

The Reichstag did not allocate funds for the reactivation of Nixe in the 1910 fiscal year, however, and so she had to be decommissioned again on 18 May. Nixe was stricken from the naval register on 24 June 1911, the last sailing ship of the Imperial Navy still on the register, and converted into a barracks ship at Kiel. She served on that capacity, attached to the Naval Gunnery School, into the 1920s. On 1 April 1923, she was renamed Hulk C, and was sold to a private firm. Converted into a sea-going lighter and renamed Nixe, she was operated by the firm Emil Retzlaff, based in Stettin, until 1930, when she was broken up in Wewelsfleth.
