= SMS Stein =

Screw corvette of the German Imperial Navy

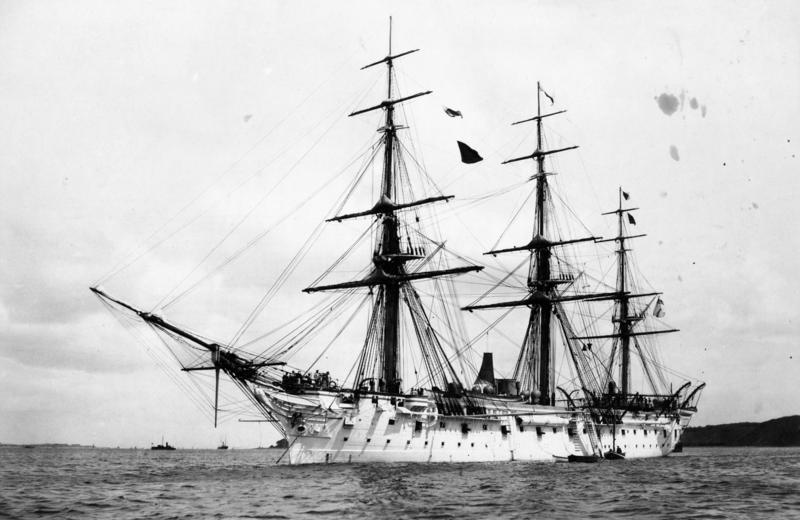
- Stein at anchor

History

German Empire
- Name: SMS Stein
- Namesake: Heinrich Friedrich Karl vom und zum Stein
- Builder: Vulcan AG, Stettin
- Laid down: 1878
- Launched: 14 September 1879
- Commissioned: 21 October 1880
- Decommissioned: 3 April 1908
- Fate: Sold for scrap, 1920

General characteristics
- Class & type: Bismarck-class corvette
- Displacement: Full load: 3,089 t (3,040 long tons)
- Length: 82 m (269 ft)
- Beam: 13.7 m (44 ft 11 in)
- Draft: 5.2 m (17 ft 1 in)
- Installed power: 2,500 ihp (1,900 kW); 4 × fire-tube boilers
- Propulsion: 1 × screw propeller; 1 × marine steam engine
- Speed: 13 knots (24 km/h; 15 mph)
- Range: 2,380 nmi (4,410 km; 2,740 mi) at 9 knots (17 km/h; 10 mph)
- Complement: 452 (including trainees)
- Armament: 12 × 15 cm (5.9 in) guns; 2 × 88 mm (3.5 in) quick-firing guns; 6 × 37 mm (1.5 in) 5-barreled guns

SMS Stein was a Bismarck-class corvette built for the German Imperial Navy (Kaiserliche Marine) in the late 1870s. The ship was named after the Prussian statesman Heinrich Friedrich Karl vom und zum Stein. She was the sixth member of the class, which included five other vessels. The Bismarck-class corvettes were ordered as part of a major naval construction program in the early 1870s, and she was designed to serve as a fleet scout and on extended tours in Germany's colonial empire. Stein was laid down in 1878, launched in September 1879, and was commissioned into the fleet in October 1880. She was armed with a battery of twelve 15 cm (5.9 in) guns and had a full ship rig to supplement her steam engine on long cruises abroad.

Stein served almost her entire career as a training ship; her only non-training task came early in her career when she carried a replacement crew to Chinese waters for her sister ship Stosch in 1883–1884. The rest of her time in service was spent training naval cadets and apprentice seamen and participating in squadron and fleet training exercises. Her training duties frequently involved long-distance overseas cruises, typically either to the Mediterranean Sea or the West Indies and South America. On these cruises, Stein and other training ships visited foreign ports and responded to problems that arose involving German nationals abroad. She served in this role from 1885 to 1908, when she was stricken from the naval register and converted into a barracks ship. She continued on in this limited capacity through World War I, before being broken up in 1920.

== Design ==
An unidentified Bismarck-class corvette

The six ships of the Bismarck class were ordered in the early 1870s to supplement Germany's fleet of cruising warships, which at that time relied on several ships that were twenty years old. Stein and her sister ships were intended to patrol Germany's colonial empire and safeguard German economic interests around the world. They were designed as a smaller and more economical version of the preceding Leipzig-class corvettes.

Stein was 82 meters (269 ft) long overall, with a beam of 13.7 m (44 ft 11 in) and a draft of 5.2 m (17 ft 1 in) forward. She displaced 2,994 metric tons (2,947 long tons) at full load. The ship's crew consisted of 18 officers and 386 enlisted men. Her hull had a straight stem and was sheathed with zinc to prevent marine biofouling on long voyages abroad.

She was powered by a single marine steam engine that drove one 2-bladed screw propeller, with steam provided by four coal-fired fire-tube boilers, which was vented through a single, retractable funnel. Her propulsion system gave her a top speed of 13 knots (24 km/h; 15 mph) at 2,535 metric horsepower (2,500 ihp). She had a cruising radius of 2,380 nautical miles (4,410 km; 2,740 mi) at a speed of 9 knots (17 km/h; 10 mph). As built, Stein was equipped with a full ship rig, but this was later reduced.

Stein was armed with a battery of sixteen 15 cm (5.9 in) 22-caliber (cal.) breech-loading guns and four 8 cm (3.1 in) 25-cal. guns. Her armament was revised several times during her career; by 1890, the number of 15 cm guns had been reduced to ten. She also had six 3.7 cm (1.5 in) Hotchkiss revolver cannon installed for close-range defense against torpedo boats. During another refit in the 1890s, two of her 15 cm guns were added, along with a pair of 8.8 cm (3.5 in) guns and four 6 cm (2.4 in) guns. In the early 1900s, she was rearmed with a pair of 10.5 cm (4.1 in) guns, ten 8.8 cm guns, and four 3.7 cm guns.

== Service history ==
=== Construction ===
The keel for Stein, the last member of the Bismarck class, was laid down in 1878 at the AG Vulcan shipyard in Stettin. Construction began under the contract name Ersatz Hertha, (Note: German warships were ordered under provisional names. Additions to the fleet were given a single letter; ships intended to replace older or lost vessels were ordered as "Ersatz (name of the ship to be replaced)".) and at her launching on 14 September 1879, was christened Stein in honor of Heinrich Friedrich Karl vom und zum Stein by Kaiser Wilhelm I. While she was being towed from Stettin to Kiel, she struck an uncharted reef off Prerow, though she was undamaged in the accident. On 23 May 1880 the Kaiserliche Werft in Kiel began the process of equipping and arming the ship, and on 21 October she was commissioned for sea trials, though they were temporarily halted on 23 December, when the ship was decommissioned for the winter. She returned to service on 15 March 1881 for additional trials, which lasted until 30 April. She was then placed in reserve, and on 23 May 1882, Stein was transferred to Wilhelmshaven.

=== 1883–1888 ===
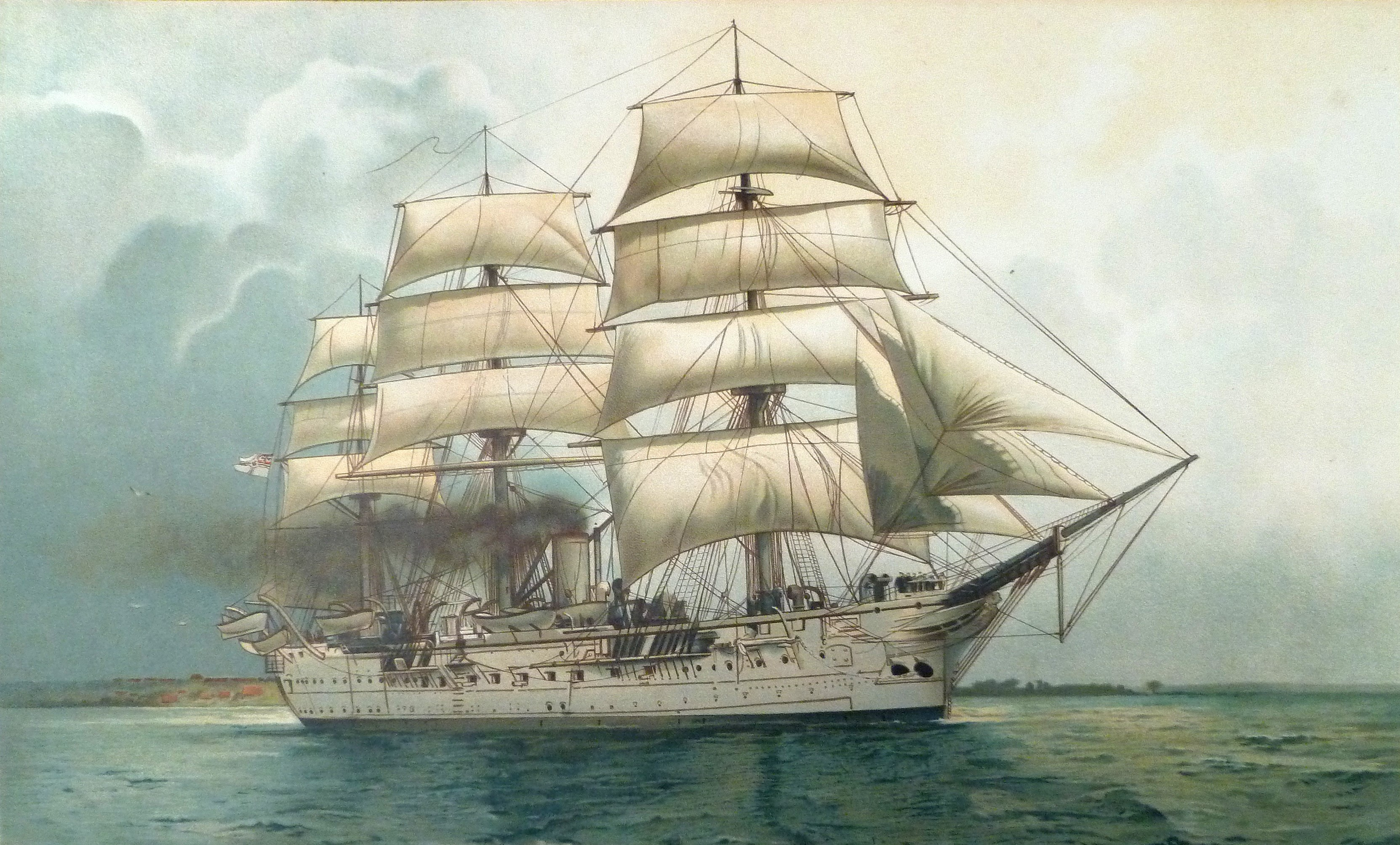
Stein in service as a training ship

At the time, the standard German practice was to charter civilian ships to bring replacement crews to warships stationed abroad, but none were available for this purpose, so Stein was commissioned on 1 July 1883 for this purpose. She left Wilhelmshaven on 16 July, bound for Hong Kong, where she met her sister ship Stosch on 4 November. After exchanging crews, she began the voyage back to Germany on 10 November and arrived in Wilhelmshaven on 6 January 1884, where she was decommissioned eleven days later. This stint in reserve lasted more than a year, and on 14 April 1885 she was recommissioned as a training ship for four-year volunteers. From then to mid-July, she was occupied with training cruises in the North and Baltic Seas, at which point she joined the Training Squadron as the flagship of Konteradmiral (KAdm—Rear Admiral) Louis von Blanc. She participated in the annual fleet maneuvers in August and September, which featured simulated attacks on the bases at Kiel and Wilhelmshaven.

The German navy generally deactivated its ships over the winter months, but a series of accidents during the summer maneuvers convinced the naval command to form a training squadron after the conclusion of the exercises on 23 September. Stein served as the flagship of the unit, which also included her sister Moltke and the corvettes Marie and Ariadne. The four ships cruised to the West Indies, leaving Wilhelmshaven on 11 October. They stopped in Cape Verde on 13 November, where they remained for two weeks owing to tensions with Spain over the Caroline Islands and the departure of the German East Africa Squadron. The conflict with Spain was resolved by 30 November, allowing the ships to continue on to the Caribbean, where they toured ports in the region. They left in early 1886 and arrived in Wilhelmshaven on 27 March, where the squadron was dissolved three days later.

Stein then went into the shipyard in Wilhelmshaven for repairs before resuming training ship duties on 3 May. The Training Squadron was reformed on 19 July, with Stein again the flagship; she and Moltke were joined by the corvettes Sophie and Prinz Adalbert and the ironclad Hansa. The unit conducted exercises in the Baltic, followed by the annual maneuvers with the rest of the fleet in August and September. The winter training cruise to the West Indies began on 14 October, though without Hansa; while the ships were in Lisbon en route to their destination, Sophie was detached to reinforce German forces in West African waters. After arriving in the Caribbean, the Training Squadron was joined by the corvette Nixe. Tensions with France forced the squadron to return home prematurely on 3 February 1887, and they used a route to the north of Great Britain to avoid contact with French warships. By the time the squadron had reached the coast of Ireland on 11 March, the situation had calmed, though they were still instructed to return to Germany. While in Southampton, they joined the celebration for Wilhelm I's 90th birthday on 22 March. The ships reached Wilhelmshaven on 30 March and the squadron was again disbanded on 4 April.

The rest of 1887 followed a similar pattern to previous years. After completing periodic maintenance to the ships, the Training Squadron was again reformed under the command of KAdm Philipp von Kall with Stein as flagship and also including her sister Gneisenau, Moltke, and Prinz Adalbert. Their routine was interrupted by a ceremony for the beginning of construction on the Kaiser Wilhelm Canal in June. On 1 October, the winter training cruise began, though this year the ships went to the Mediterranean Sea. While in Naples on 19 November, Stein caught fire, though the fire was quickly suppressed by her crew, with help from Prinz Adalbert and men from the Italian corvette Vittorio Emanuele. While Stein was being repaired, Kall transferred his flag to Gneisenau from 19 November to 8 January 1888. On 13 March, the ships began the voyage back to Germany, and while en route visited Madeira and São Vicente, Cape Verde before arriving back in Wilhelmshaven on 10 April. Five days later, the squadron was again dissolved, only to be reformed on 5 May.

=== 1888–1897 ===
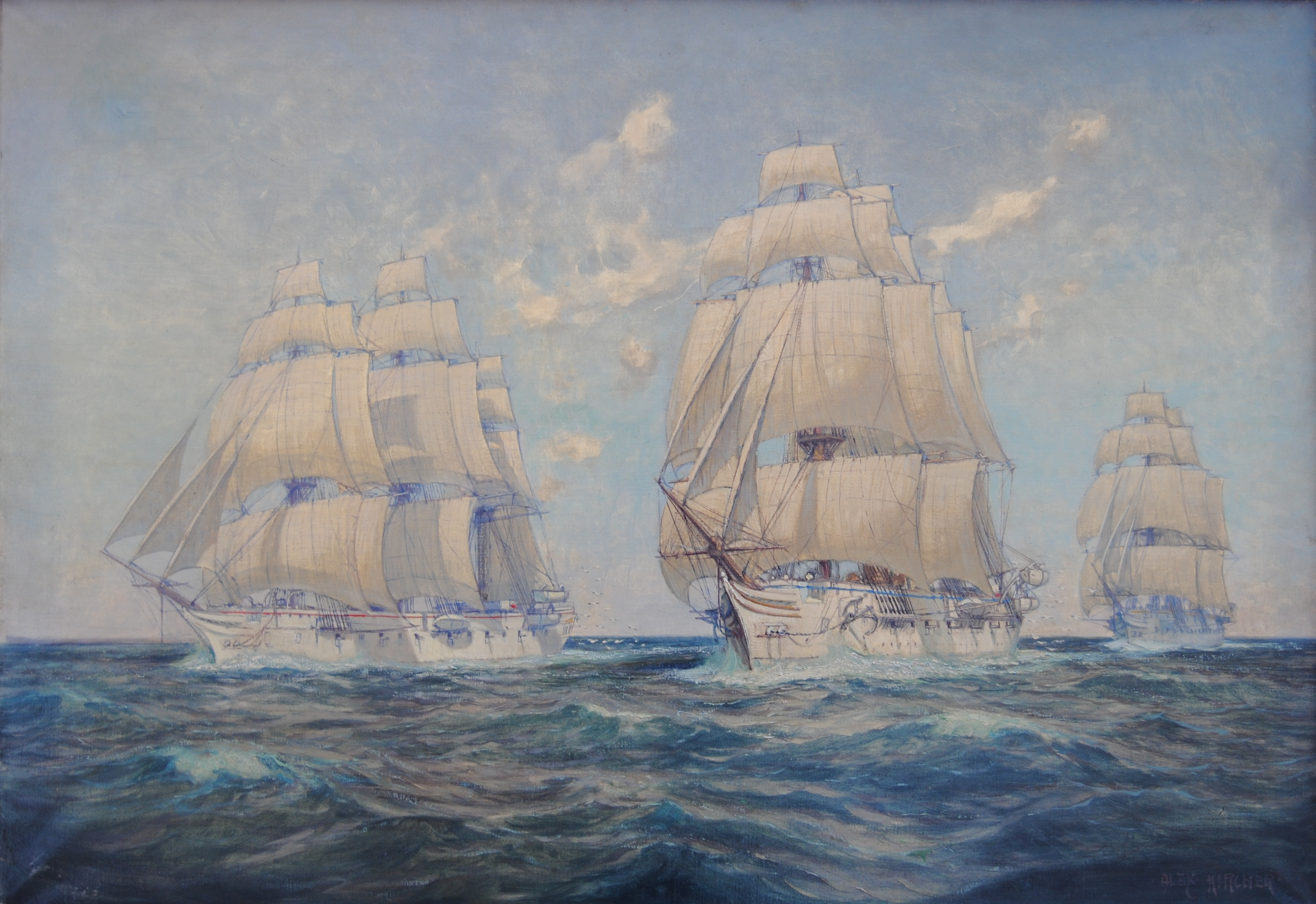
A painting of Stein, Stosch, and Gneisenau under sail, by Alexander Kircher

The typical summer training program was interrupted by a visit of Kaiser Wilhelm II to St. Petersburg, Russia, Stockholm, Sweden, and Copenhagen, Denmark, which the Training Squadron ships accompanied. They then joined the rest of the fleet for the annual autumn maneuvers in August and September; after they concluded, Stein was decommissioned on 20 September for modernization, which included re-boilering, placing some of her guns with new quick-firing weapons, and additional crew spaces that could be used to house up to 50 cadets and 210 Schiffsjungen (apprentice seamen) for training. She was also formally added to the list of training ships at this time. The modernization was a lengthy process, and she was ready for service only on 27 April 1893, when she was recommissioned. Less than a month later, she ran aground off Ekensund on 26 May, though she was able to free herself with no damage. She then visited Stockholm with Stosch; there she was visited by the King of Sweden and Ludwig III of Bavaria. She and Gneisenau took part in the Cowes Regatta in late July and early August in company with Wilhelm II aboard his yacht, Hohenzollern.

Stein took part in the autumn maneuvers from 28 August to 23 September, followed by the winter training cruise, which again went to the West Indies and concluded in Kiel on 27 March 1894. While in La Guaira, Venezuela in December 1893, Stein represented Germany at the opening of a German-funded rail line that connected the city to the capital Caracas. After returning to Kiel, Stein went into drydock for repairs, followed by a short voyage to Christiana, Norway in July, to bring Kaiserin Augusta Victoria back to Kiel. The fleet maneuvers then took place, lasting from 19 August to 21 September. Stein again served as the flagship, this time for KAdm August von Thomsen, the commander of II Squadron. Another overhaul followed the maneuvers, and on 2 October, she cruised with Gneisenau to the Mediterranean for the winter training cruise, returning to Germany in early 1895.

In May 1895, she and four other training ships cruised in the Baltic, in what was now IV Division, commanded by KAdm Otto von Diederichs. During this period, she also attended the opening of the Kaiser Wilhelm Canal. In July, she cruised to Helsingfors with Hohenzollern, the ships returning to Kiel on 20 July. Stein then made a visit to Lerwick from 27 July to 14 August, after which she joined the rest of the fleet for the annual maneuvers in the North and Baltic Seas. Stein began the winter cruise earlier than in previous years, on 25 September, this time again visiting the West Indies. Stosch and Gneisenau joined her, and the three ships stopped in Havana, Cuba, where unrest against the Spanish colonial government threatened Germans in the city. In late January 1896, the ships could leave the area, and early the next month Stein went to Caracas to support the German ambassador who was negotiating with the Venezuelan government over payment for the railway opened in December 1893, a classic example of gunboat diplomacy. On 7 February, Stein and the other ships were recalled to Germany, and they arrived in Kiel on 18 February.

Stein and Stosch conducted exercises in the Baltic in July, and they visited Kronstadt and St. Petersburg between 8 and 15 July; in the latter city, Czar Nicholas II received the officers of both ships. Stein then continued on alone, visiting Bergen, Norway, before returning to Kiel on 2 August. She joined the fleet maneuvers from 9 August to 15 September, after which she embarked on the winter cruise to the West Indies on 26 September. While in Madeira on the out-bound leg of the cruise, however, the training squadron was diverted to the Mediterranean to respond to unrest in the Ottoman Empire. After stopping in several harbors in the Levant, Stein stayed in Alexandria, Egypt with Moltke and Gneisenau, finally returning to Kiel on 25 March 1897.

=== 1897–1920 ===
An unidentified member of the class, likely in the 1890s

During the fleet maneuvers in August and September 1897, Stein served with the reconnaissance group of the main fleet. On 19 September, Admiral Hans von Koester, the Chief of the Marinestation der Ostsee (Naval Station of the Baltic Sea), came aboard the ship to represent Wilhelm II at a celebration of King Oscar II's 25th year on the throne of Sweden–Norway. This delayed the start of the winter training cruise to 2 November. The ships did go to the West Indies this year, and in early December, Stein and Charlotte were sent to Port-au-Prince, Haiti, where Haitians had attacked German nationals. The situation was resolved by 14 December, allowing the ships to leave for Germany. While en route, they stopped in Antwerp, where they joined celebrations for the 25th anniversary of Leopold II of Belgium ascending to the throne. Stein reached Kiel on 27 March 1898, where she was decommissioned on 19 April.

After Gneisenau was wrecked in bad weather off Málaga on 16 December 1900, Stein was reactivated to take her place. She embarked on her first training cruise of this commissioning on 28 January 1901, bound for Lisbon, Portugal and Gibraltar. She returned to Kiel on 1 April and, over the course of 30 May to 1 August, she took part in training exercises, made a visit to Riga to participate in celebrations marking the 700th anniversary of the city's founding, and toured ports in the North Sea. She then began a cruise to the West Indies; while stopped in San Sebastián, she was visited by the Spanish king, Alfonso XIII. Stein reached Port of Spain on 18 October and joined the East American Cruiser Division, though she returned to Germany on 6 January 1902. She moved to Kiel on 17 March to begin preparing for the year's training routine, which began in mid-May with exercises in the Baltic and North Seas.

On 29 July, Stein began another cruise to the Mediterranean, stopping in the Azores on the way. She visited Constantinople on 10 November, where Sultan Abdul Hamid II received the ship's commander and the other senior officers. Stein then went to Piraeus, Greece, where the gunboat Loreley was holding a German seaman who had been convicted of murder; Stein took the man aboard to return him to Germany for judgement. On leaving the port, Stein passed through the Corinth Canal, the first German warship to do so. She arrived in Kiel on 18 March 1903, and after completing an overhaul, took cruises in the North and Baltic Seas beginning on 15 May. Later in the year she went on another cruise to the West Indies and also visited ports in southern North America, before returning to Kiel on 22 March 1904. She then cruised in the North Sea and visited Iceland, before beginning another Mediterranean cruise; while in Corfu, Stein celebrated her 25th year in commission on 21 October. She arrived back in Germany on 18 March 1906.

Stein made a brief cruise in the Baltic later in 1906, and went on other cruise to the West Indies toward the end of the year, returning to Germany on 20 March 1907. On 17 July, she began her last overseas cruise, sailing to Funchal in Madeira before entering the Mediterranean. She returned to Kiel on 21 March 1908 and then went to Wilhelmshaven, where she was decommissioned for the last time on 3 April. She was stricken from the naval register on 21 May and converted into a barracks ship, a role she filled through World War I. After the end of the war, Stein was discarded as part of the dismantling of Germany's navy, being broken up in 1920.
