= List of naval ships of Germany =

The list of naval ships of Germany includes all naval ships which have been in service of the German Navy or its predecessors.

Other lists include:

- List of ships of the Imperial German Navy
- List of Kriegsmarine ships
- List of German Federal Navy ships
- List of German Navy ships
- List of German Navy ship classes
- List of U-boats of Germany
- List of battleships of Germany

== A ==
- Acheron: hulk, launched 1877
- Acheron: submarine tender, launched 1919
- Acheron: minesweeper, launched 1967
- Adam Kuckhoff: P-6-class torpedo boat
- Adam Kuckhoff: Shershen-class torpedo boat
- Adeline Hugo Stinnes 3; seaplane tender
- Adjutant: tender, launched 1905
- Adjutant: auxiliary mine-layer, launched 1937
- Adler: 880 ton Habicht-class gunboat, launched 1883
- Adler: training vessel, launched 1908
- Adler: SO-I-class submarine chaser
- Admiral Graf Spee: 12,000 ton Deutschland-class heavy cruiser, launched 1933
- Admiral Hipper: 14,000 ton Admiral Hipper-class heavy cruiser, launched 1937
- Admiral Scheer: 12,000 ton Deutschland-class heavy cruiser, launched 1934
- Adolf Bestelmeyer: experimental craft, launched 1943
- Adolf Lüderitz: Fleet tender, launched 20 February 1939, commissioned 11 June 1940
- Ägir: 3,700 ton Odin-class coastal defense ship: launched 1895
- Ahrenshoop (GS08): Kondor-class minesweeper
- Albatros (1926): Type 1923 torpedo boat, launched 15 July 1926, commissioned 5 May 1927, beached 9 April 1940
- Albatros (S7): Seeadler-class (Type 141) fast attack craft, commissioned 1959 to 1975
- Albatros (S61): Albatros-class (Type 143) fast attack craft, decommissioned
- Albatros: SO-I-class submarine chaser
- Albatross (1871): gunboat, launched 1871
- Albatross (1907): 2,000 ton Nautilus-class minelayer: launched 1907
- Albert Gast (734): Osa-class missile boat
- Albert Leo Schlageter: Sail training ship, launched 1937, became Portuguese training ship Sagres in 1961
- Albin Köbis: training vessel, ex-Ernst Thälmann
- Albin Köbis (S-712): Osa-class missile boat
- Albin Köbis (571): Tarantul-class corvette
- Aldebaran: minesweeper, launched 1941
- Alders: tender, launched 1918
- Alexandrine: corvette, launched 1885
- Alfred Merz: buoy tender
- Algol: minesweeper, launched 1943
- Algol: minesweeper, launched 1963
- Alice Roosevelt: torpedo boat, launched 1886
- Alk (S29): Jaguar-class (Type 140) fast attack craft, commissioned 1960—1974
- Alk (S55): Tiger-class (Type 148) fast attack craft, decommissioned
- Alliance: NATO research vessel under German flag, in service since 1988
- Alster: survey vessel, launched 1961
- Alster: Oste-class (Type 423) fleet service, surveillance, and ELINT ship
- Altenburg (314): Kondor-class minesweeper
- Altentreptow (GS04): Kondor-class minesweeper
- Altmark (H11): Ohre-class support ship
- Amazone (1843): 3-masted sail corvette of the Prussian Navy
- Amazone (1900): 2,700 ton Gazelle-class light cruiser
- Amazone: minesweeper, launched 1963
- Ammerland: submarine tender, launched 1921
- Ammersee: Walchensee-class (Type 703) small coastal tanker
- Amrum: Sylt-class tug
- Angeln: transport, launched 1954
- Angermünde (214): Parchim-class corvette
- Anklam: Schwalbe-class minesweeper
- Anklam (S426): Kondor-class minesweeper
- Anklam (635): Frosch I-class landing craft
- Answald: seaplane tender
- Anton Saefkow (826): P-6-class torpedo boat
- Anton Saefkow (853): Shershen-class torpedo boat
- Anton Schmitt (Z22): Type 1936 destroyer, launched 1938
- Arcona: frigate, launched 1858
- Arcona: corvette, launched 1885
- Arcona: 2,700 ton Gazelle-class light cruiser, launched 22 April 1902, commissioned 12 May 1903, recommissioned 27 May 1940 as a floating anti-aircraft battery, scrapped 1948
- Ariadne: corvette, launched 1871
- Ariadne: 2,700 ton Gazelle-class light cruiser, launched 1900
- Ariadne: Ariadne-class minesweeper
- Arkona: experimental craft, launched 1918
- Arkona: Sperling-class buoy tender
- Arkona (D113): SK-76-class buoy tender
- Arkturus: minesweeper, launched 1943
- Arminius: Unique ironclad warship
- Artur Becker (828): P-6-class torpedo boat
- Artur Becker (816): Shershen-class torpedo boat
- Arvid Harnack (821): P-6-class torpedo boat
- Arvid Harnack (813): Shershen-class torpedo boat
- Atair: minesweeper, launched 1941
- Atair: minesweeper, launched 1961
- Atlantis: 17,000 ton unique auxiliary merchant cruiser
- Atlantis: Frauenlob-class minesweeper, launched 1961
- Aue: Schwalbe-class minesweeper
- Auerbach/Oberpfalz: Ensdorf-class (Type 352) minesweeper
- Augsburg (cruiser): 4,400 ton Kolberg-class light cruiser, launched 1909
- Augsburg (F222): Köln-class (Type 120) frigate, commissioned 1962 to 1988
- Augsburg (F213): Bremen-class (Type 122) frigate
- Augusta: Augusta-class corvette
- August Lüttgens (732): Osa-class missile boat
- Ayesha: schooner, launched 1907

== B ==
- Bad Bevensen: Frankenthal-class (Type 332) minehunter
- Bad Doberan (242): Hai-class submarine chaser
- Bad Doberan (222): Parchim-class corvette
- Bad Rappenau: Frankenthal-class (Type 332) minehunter
- Baden (1880): 7,800 ton Sachsen-class ironclad, la-unched 1880
- Baden: 29,000 ton Bayern-class battleship, launched 1915
- Baltrum: Wangerooge-class (Type 722) tug
- Bansin (G446): Kondor-class minesweeper
- Bant: Experimental craft; Stollergrund-class
- Barbara, training vessel, launched 1915
- Barbarossa: converted ocean-liner, commissioned 1849
- Barbe: Barbe-class (Type 520) utility landing craft, used as transport ships (decommissioned)
- Basilisk (1862): gunboat, launched 1862
- Basilisk (1878): armoured gunboat, launched 1878
- Bayern (1878): 7,800 ton Sachsen-class ironclad, launched 1878
- Bayern: 29,000 ton Bayern-class battleship, launched 1915
- Bayern (D183): Hamburg-class (Type 101A) destroyer, decommissioned
- Bayern (F217): Brandenburg-class (Type 123) frigate
- Belchen, supply vessel, launched 1932
- Beowulf: 3,700 ton Siegfried-class coastal defense ship, launched 1890
- Beowulf, training vessel, launched 1916
- Bergen: Sicherungsboot; Todendorf-class
- Bergen: Habicht-class mine-warfare vessel
- Bergen (S425): Kondor-class minesweeper
- Bergen (213): Parchim-class corvette
- Berlin: 3,300 ton Bremen-class light cruiser
- Berlin, auxiliary cruiser, launched 1908
- Berlin, Krake-class mine-warfare vessel, launched 1957
- Berlin — Hauptstadt der DDR (412): Koni-class coastal protection vessel, launched 1979
- Berlin (A1411): Berlin-class (Type 702) replenishment and combat support ship^
- Bernau (343): Kondor-class minesweeper
- Bernd von Arnim (Z11), Type 1934A destroyer, launched 1936
- Bernhard Bästlein (827): P-6-class torpedo boat
- Bernhard Bästlein (836): Shershen-class torpedo boat
- Bernhard von Tschirschky: Air control ship; Krischan-class
- Biene: armoured gunboat, launched 1876
- Biene, escort vessel, launched 1941
- Bismarck: 3,000 ton Bismarck-class corvette, launched 1877
- Bismarck: 42,000 ton Bismarck-class battleship, launched 1939
- Bitterfeld (332): Kondor-class minesweeper
- Blauort: harbour tug; Klasse 729
- Blitz (1862): gunboat, launched 1862
- Blitz (1882): aviso, launched 1882
- Blitz, remote controlled craft, launched 1910
- Blitz: buoy tender
- Blücher: 3,000 ton Bismarck-class corvette, launched 1877
- Blücher: 15,800 ton unique heavy cruiser, launched 1908
- Blücher: 14,000 ton Admiral Hipper-class heavy cruiser, launched 1937
- Bochum, mine-layer, launched 1944
- Bodensee, tanker, launched 1955
- Boelke: air control ship; K-V-class
- Börde (H72): Ohre-class support ship
- Boltenhagen (GS09): Kondor-class minesweeper
- Bonin: gunboat, launched 1833
- Bonn: Berlin-class (Type 702) replenishment and combat support ship (ordered)
- Borkum, tanker, launched 1939
- Borna: Schwalbe-class minesweeper
- Bottrop, mine-layer, launched 1944
- Bottsand: Bottsand-class oil recovery ship, commissioned 1984
- Brandenburg: 10,500 ton Brandenburg-class battleship, launched 1891
- Brandenburg, mine warfare vessel, launched 1936
- Brandenburg: Schwalbe-class minesweeper
- Brandenburg (F215): Brandenburg-class (Type 123) frigate
- Brandtaucher, experimental submarine
- Brasse: Barbe-class (Type 520) utility landing craft, used as transport ships (decommissioned)
- Braunschweig (battleship): 13,000 ton Braunschweig-class battleship, launched 1902
- Braunschweig (F224): Köln-class (Type 120) frigate, commissioned 1964 to 1989
- Braunschweig (F260): Braunschweig-class (Type 130) corvette, launched 2006, commissioned 2008
- Breitgrund: experimental craft; Stollergrund-class
- Breitling (D26): SK-64-class buoy tender
- Bremen (1842): corvette, launched 1842
- Bremen (cruiser): 3,300 ton Bremen-class light cruiser, launched 1903
- Bremen (F207): Bremen-class (Type 122) frigate (in commission 1982 to 2014)
- Bremse (1884): armoured gunboat, launched 1884
- Bremse (cruiser): 4,400 ton Brummer-class mine-laying cruiser, launched 1916
- Bremse (auxiliary): Auxiliary gunnery training ship, launched 1931, commissioned 14 July 1932, sunk 7 August 1941
- Bremse, training vessel, launched 1940
- Breslau: Magdeburg-class light cruiser, launched 1911
- Brommy, auxiliary, launched 1916
- Brommy: Hunt-class frigate, former Royal Navy HMS Eggesford, commissioned 1959 to 1965
- Brummer (1884): armoured gunboat, launched 1884
- Brummer (cruiser): 4,400 ton Brummer-class mine-laying cruiser, launched 1915
- Brummer (auxiliary): Auxiliary gunnery training ship, launched 29 May 1935, commissioned 8 February 1936, sunk 15 April 1940
- Brummer (minelayer): Minelayer, former Norwegian HNoMS Olav Tryggvason, captured 9 April 1940
- Brummer: training vessel; Wespe-class
- Bruno Heinemann (Z8), Type 1934A destroyer, launched 1936
- Buéa: E-boat tender
- Bruno Kühn (822): P-6-class torpedo boat
- Bruno Kühn (823): Shershen-class torpedo boat
- Bützow (244): Hai-class submarine chaser
- Bützow (244): Parchim-class coastal protection vessel
- Buk: tug
- Bukarest: seaplane tender
- Burg: Schwalbe-class minesweeper
- Bussard (cruiser): 1,650 ton Bussard-class light cruiser, launched 1890
- Bussard: seaplane tender; Bussard-class
- Bussard: SO-I-class submarine chaser
- Bussard (S25): Seeadler-class (Type 141) fast attack craft, commissioned 1959 to 1975
- Bussard (S64): Albatros-class (Type 143) fast attack craft, decommissioned
- Butt: Barbe-class (Type 520) utility landing craft, used as transport ships (decommissioned)

== C ==
- Calbe: Schwalbe-class minesweeper
- Camäleon: gunboat, launched 1860
- Camaeleon: armoured gunboat, launched 1878
- Cap Arcona: 27,500 tonnes converted from ocean liner to troop ship, launched 1927, sunk 1945
- Cap Trafalgar: 18,710 GRT, auxiliary cruiser, launched 1913, sunk 1914
- Capella: minesweeper; R-boat
- Capella: minesweeper; Schütze-class
- Carl F. Gauss: survey vessel; Kondor-II-class
- Carl Peters: fleet tender, launched 13 April 1939, commissioned 6 January 1940
- Carl Zeiss: training vessel, launched 1939
- Carmen: torpedo boat, launched 1886
- Carola: corvette, launched 1880
- Castor:R-boat, commissioned 1944—1962
- Castor: Krebs-class (Type 340) minesweeper, commissioned 1962—1990)
- Charlotte: corvette, launched 1885
- Claus von Bevern: experimental craft, launched 1911
- Cobra: mine warfare vessel, launched 1926
- Coburg: Lüneburg-class (Type 701) replenishment ship
- Cöln (1909): 4,400 ton Kolberg-class light cruiser, launched 1909
- Cöln (1916): 5,600 ton Cöln-class light cruiser, launched 1916
- Colberg: guard ship
- Comet: gunboat, launched 1860, commissioned 1861—1881
- Comet: aviso, launched 1892
- Concordia: gun sloop, launched 1848
- Condor: cruiser, launched 1892
- Cormoran: light cruiser, launched 1892, scuttled 1914
- Cormoran: auxiliary cruiser, scuttled 1917
- Coronel: 11,000 ton unique auxiliary merchant cruiser
- Cottbus: Habicht-class minesweeper
- Cottbus (614): Frosch I-class landing craft
- Crocodill (1860): gunboat, launched 1860
- Crocodill (1879): armoured gunboat, launched 1879
- Cuxhaven: Lindau-class (Type 320) minesweeper, commissioned 1959 to 1976, upgraded to Type 331, recommissioned 1979 to 2000
- Cyclop: gunboat, launched 1860
- Cyclop: dock ship, launched 1916

== D ==
- Dachs (S33): Zobel-class (Type 142) fast attack craft, commissioned 1962—1983
- Dachs (S77): Gepard-class (Type 143A) fast attack craft
- Dänholm: buoy tender, ex-Leitholm
- Danzig (1825): gunboat, launched 1825
- Danzig (1851): corvette, launched 1851
- Danzig: 3,300 ton Bremen-class light cruiser, launched 1905
- Darss (E441): Darss-class supply ship
- Darsser Ort: Sperling-class buoy tender
- Darsser Ort (D22): SK-76-class buoy tender
- Datteln: Frankenthal-class (Type 332) minehunter
- Delphin: gunboat, launched 1860
- Delphin (1906): artillery tender and training vessel
- Delphin (1918): artillery training vessel
- Delphin: Barbe-class (Type 520) utility landing craft, used as transport ships (decommissioned)
- Delphin (A47): Zander-class salvage tug
- Demmin (GS02): Kondor-class minesweeper
- Deneb (1943), mine warfare vessel
- Deneb (1961), mine warfare vessel
- Derfflinger: 27,000 ton Derfflinger-class battlecruiser, launched 1913
- Der Königliche Ernst August: corvette, launched 1848
- Dessau (331): Kondor-class minesweeper
- Detmold: Vegesack-class (Type 321) minesweeper, commissioned 1960 to 1969
- Deutschland: frigate
- Deutschland (1874): 7,600 ton Kaiser-class ironclad, launched 1872
- Deutschland (1904): 13,000 ton Deutschland-class battleship, launched 1904
- Deutschland (1914): Auxiliary minelayer
- Deutschland (1923): 21,000 ton ocean liner converted in hospital ship, launched 1923, sunk 1945
- Deutschland (1927): School ship
- Deutschland (cruiser): 12,000 ton Deutschland-class heavy cruiser, launched 1931, renamed Lützow in 1939
- Deutschland (A59): Training cruiser
- Diana (M2664), Frauenlob-class, launched 1966
- Diether von Roeder (Z17), Type 1936 destroyer, launched 1937, scuttled 1940
- Dietrich von Bern,
- Dillingen: Frankenthal-class (Type 332) minehunter
- Dithmarschen (1937): supply ship
- Dithmarschen (1955): supply ship
- Doggerbank: mine warfare vessel, launched 1926, sunk 1943
- Dommel (S21): Jaguar-class fast attack craft fast attack craft, commissioned 1961—1974
- Dommel (S56): Tiger-class (Type 148) fast attack craft, decommissioned
- Donau (1921), submarine tender
- Donau: Rhein-class (Type 401) tender
- Donau (A516): Elbe-class (Type 404) replenishment ship
- Dornbusch: buoy tender
- Dorsch: Barbe-class (Type 520) utility landing craft, used as transport ships (decommissioned)
- Drache: gunboat, launched 1865
- Drache (1908): artillery tender and training vessel
- Drache: mine-warfare ships
- Dresden (1907): 3,700 ton Dresden-class light cruiser, launched 1907
- Dresden (1917): 5,600 ton Cöln-class light cruiser, launched 1917
- Dresden: Krake-class minesweeper
- Dr. Richard Sorge (713): Osa-class missile boat
- Düren: Lindau-class (Type 320) minesweeper, commissioned 1959 to 1979, upgraded to Type 351, recommissioned 1989 to 2000
- Dwarsläufer: mine-warfare ships; Sesia-class

== E ==
- Eber (1887): gunboat, launched 1887
- Eber: Iltis-class gunboat, launched 6 June 1903, commissioned 15 August 1903, burned 26 October 1917
- Eberswalde: Robbe-class landing craft
- Eberswalde/Finow (634): Frosch I-class landing craft
- Eckernförde (1843): frigate, later renamed Gefion
- Eduard Jungmann (1907): training craft
- Egerland (1939): supply ship
- Eidechse (1944): landing craft
- Eider: customs steamer
- Eider: Isles-class (Type 139) trawler, former Royal Navy HMS Flint
- Eifel: tanker; Klasse 766
- Eilenburg (344): Kondor-class minesweeper
- Eisbär: Eisvogel-class (Type 721) icebreaker, decommissioned 1997
- Eisbär: icebreaker, taken by the Soviet Union in 1946, decommissioned in 1979
- Eisenach: Schwalbe-class minesweeper
- Eisenhüttenstadt: Robbe-class landing craft
- Eisenhüttenstadt (615): Frosch I-class landing craft
- Eisleben: Schwalbe-class minesweeper
- Eisleben (312): Kondor-class minesweeper
- Eismöve: Schnellboot fast attack craft, commissioned 1956—1967
- Eisvogel: Eisvogel-class (Type 721) icebreaker
- Eisvogel: icebreaker, taken by the Soviet Union in 1946, decommissioned in 1972
- Elbe (1831): schooner, launched 1831
- Elbe: R-boat tender
- Elbe: Rhein-class (Type 401) tender
- Elbe (A511): Elbe-class (Type 404) replenishment ship
- Elbing: Pillau-class light cruiser, launched 1914
- Elisabeth: frigate, 1868
- Ellerbek: harbour tug; Neuende-class
- Elsass: 13,000 ton Braunschweig-class battleship, launched 1903
- Elsaß (1930): mine warfare vessel
- Elster (S19): Jaguar-class (Type 140) fast attack craft, commissioned 1960—1974
- Elster (S54): Tiger-class (Type 148) fast attack craft, decommissioned
- Elster: SO-I-class submarine chaser
- Emden (1908): 3,700 ton Dresden-class light cruiser, launched 1908
- Emden (1915): Königsberg-class light cruiser, launched 1916
- Emden (cruiser): 6,000 ton unique light cruiser, launched 1925
- Emden (F221): Köln-class (Type 120) frigate, commissioned 1961 to 1983
- Emden (F210): Bremen-class (Type 122) frigate
- Ems (1940): tender
- Emsland (1943): tanker
- Ensdorf: Ensdorf-class (Type 352) minesweeper
- Erfurt: Krake-class minesweeper
- Erfurt: Braunschweig-class (Type 130) corvette, commissioned 2013
- Erich Giese (Z12): Type 1934A destroyer
- Erich Koellner (Z13): Type 1934A destroyer
- Erich Kuttner (863): P-6-class torpedo boat
- Erich Steinbrinck (Z15): Type 1934A destroyer
- Ermland (1939): supply ship
- Ernst Grube (833): Shershen-class torpedo boat
- Ernst Schneller (864): P-6-class torpedo boat
- Ernst Schneller(851): Shershen-class torpedo boat
- Ernst Thälmann (141): Riga-class frigate
- Erwin Wassner (1938): submarine escort vessel
- Erzherzog Johann: corvette, launched 1840
- Esau (1941): fast attack craft
- Esper Ort (D28): SK-64-class buoy tender
- ESSO Hamburg (1939): tanker
- Etkar André (822): P-6-class torpedo boat
- Etkar André (811): Shershen-class torpedo boat
- Eutin (1943): tanker
- Eversand: Bottsand-class oil recovery ship, commissioned 1984

== F ==
- Falke (1865): aviso, launched 1865
- Falke (1891): cruiser, launched 1891
- Falke: torpedo boat; Raubvogel-class
- Falke: seaplane tender; Bussard-class
- Falke (S10): Seeadler-class (Type 141) fast attack craft, commissioned 1959 to 1975
- Falke (S62): Albatros-class (Type 143) fast attack craft, decommissioned
- Falke: SO-I-class submarine chaser
- Fasana: mine-warfare ships; Fasana-class
- Flink: torpedo boat; Schütze-class
- Föhr: harbour tug; Sylt-class
- Fehmarn: Helgoland-class (Type 720) tug
- Felchen: Barbe-class (Type 520) utility landing craft, used as transport ships (decommissioned)
- Fiete Schulze (863): P-6-class torpedo boat
- Fiete Schulze (854): Shershen-class torpedo boat
- Fische (1959): mine-sweeping vessel
- Flensburg: Schooner lightship, built 1910
- Flensburg (M1084): Lindau-class (Type 320) minesweeper, commissioned 1959 to 1970, upgraded to Type 331
- Flensburg: Fulda-class (Type 331, upgraded Type 320 Lindau-class) minesweepers, commissioned 1972 to 1991
- Flunder: Barbe-class (Type 520) utility landing craft, used as transport ships (decommissioned)
- Förde (1967): support vessel
- Forst: Schwalbe-class minesweeper
- Forelle: Barbe-class (Type 520) utility landing craft, used as transport ships (decommissioned)
- Franken (1939): supply ship
- Frankenland (1950): tanker
- Frankenthal: Frankenthal-class (Type 332) minehunter
- Frankfurt: Wiesbaden-class light cruiser, launched 1915
- Frankfurt: Frankfurt-class
- Frankfurt am Main: Berlin-class (Type 702) replenishment and combat support ship
- Frankfurt/Oder: Habicht-class minesweeper
- Frankfurt/Oder (613): Frosch-I-class landing craft
- Frauenlob (1855): schooner, launched 1855
- Frauenlob: 2,700 ton Gazelle-class light cruiser
- Frauenlob (1918): Cöln-class light cruiser, cancelled 1919
- Frauenlob (1919): tender
- Frauenlob (1965): mine-sweeping vessel
- Freiberg: Schwalbe-class minesweeper
- Freiburg: Lüneburg-class (Type 701) replenishment ship
- Freesendorf: buoy tender
- Freesendorf: buoy tender
- Frettchen (S36): Zobel-class (Type 142) fast attack craft, commissioned 1963—1983
- Frettchen (S76): Gepard-class (Type 143A) fast attack craft
- Freundschaft: cutter
- Freya (1874): corvette, launched 1874
- Freya (1897): 5,700 ton Victoria Louise-class protected cruiser, launched 1897
- Freya (1960): mine-sweeping vessel
- Freyr (1912): training vessel
- Friedrich Bremse (1936): supply ship
- Friedrich Carl (1867): armoured frigate, launched 1867
- Friedrich Carl: 9,000 ton Prinz Adalbert-class armored cruiser, launched 1902
- Friedrich der Grosse (1874): 6,800 ton Preussen-class ironclad, launched 1874
- Friedrich der Grosse (1911): 25,000 ton Kaiser-class battleship, launched 1911
- Friedrich Eckoldt (Z16): Type 1934A destroyer
- Friedrich Engels (123): Riga-class frigate
- Friedrich Ihn (Z14): Type 1934A destroyer
- Friedrich Schürer: Type 202 submarine
- Friedrich Voge: experimental submarine
- Friesenland: seaplane tender
- Frithjof: 3,700 ton Siegfried-class coastal defense ship, launched 1891
- Frithjof (1916): training vessel
- Fritz Behn (841): P-6-class torpedo boat
- Fritz Behn (851): Shershen-class torpedo boat
- Fritz Gast (714): Osa-class missile boat
- Fritz Globis (573): Tarantul-class coastal protection vessel
- Fritz Heckert (866): P-6-class torpedo boat
- Fritz Heckert (834): Shershen-class torpedo boat
- Fritz Lesch (865): P-6-class torpedo boat
- Fritz Riedel (825): P-6-class torpedo boat
- Fuchs: gunboat, launched 1860
- Fuchs (1905): artillery tender and training vessel
- Fuchs (1919): anti-aircraft training vessel
- Fuchs (S13): Jaguar-class (Type 140) fast attack craft, commissioned 1959—1973
- Fuchs (S46): Tiger-class (Type 148) fast attack craft, decommissioned
- Fürst Bismarck: 10,700 ton unique armored cruiser, launched 1897
- Fürst Bismarck (1915): Mackensen-class battlecruiser, laid down in 1915 but never completed
- Fürstenberg: training vessel
- Fulda (M1086): Lindau-class (Type 320) minesweeper, commissioned 1960 to present, upgraded to Type 331, not decommissioned for upgrade
- Fulda (M1058): Frankenthal-class (Type 332) minehunter

== G ==
- Gadebusch (211): Hai-class submarine chaser
- Gadebusch (211): Parchim-class corvette
- Gazelle (1859): frigate, launched 1859
- Gazelle (1898): 2,700 ton Gazelle-class light cruiser, launched 1898
- Gazelle (1919): tender
- Gazelle (1963): mine-sweeper
- Gedania (1919): supply ship
- Gefion (1843): frigate
- Gefion: 3,700 ton unique light cruiser, launched 1893
- Gefion (1963): mine-sweeper
- Geier: 1,900 ton Bussard-class cruiser, launched 1894
- SMS Geier (1913): auxiliary cruiser
- Geier (S11): Seeadler-class (Type 141) fast attack craft, commissioned 1959 to 1975
- Geier (S63): Albatros-class (Type 143) fast attack craft, decommissioned
- Gellen (D112): SK-76-class buoy tender
- Gemma (1959): mine-sweeper
- Gentin (V812): Kondor-class minesweeper
- Georg Thiele (Z2): Type 1934 destroyer
- Gepard (S35): Zobel-class (Type 142) fast attack craft, commissioned 1963—1982
- Gepard (S71): Gepard-class (Type 143A) fast attack craft
- Gera: Krake-class minesweeper
- Germania (1848): gun sloop
- Glücksburg: Lüneburg-class (Type 701) replenishment ship
- Glyndwr: seaplane tender
- Gneisenau: 3,000 ton Bismarck-class corvette, launched 1879
- Gneisenau (armored cruiser): 11,600 ton Scharnhorst-class armored cruiser, launched 1906
- Gneisenau (battleship): 35,000 ton Scharnhorst-class battleship, launched 1936
- Gneisenau (F212): Hunt-class destroyer, former Royal Navy HMS Oakley, commissioned 1958 to 1966
- Goeben: 23,000 ton Moltke-class battlecruiser, launched 1911
- Görlitz: Schwalbe-class minesweeper
- Göttingen (M1070): Lindau-class (Type 320) minesweeper, commissioned 1958 to 1976, upgraded to Type 331
- Göttingen: Fulda-class (Type 331, upgraded Type 320 Lindau-class) minesweepers, commissioned 1979 to 1997
- Gollwitz (D25): SK-64-class buoy tender
- Gorch Fock (1933): Sail training ship, launched 1933, became Soviet training ship Tovarishch
- Gorch Fock (1958): Type 441 unique sail training barque, launched 1958
- Gotha: Schwalbe-class minesweeper
- Graal-Müritz (G424): Kondor-class minesweeper
- Graf Spee (battlecruiser): Mackensen-class battlecruiser, not completed
- Graf Spee (F215): Type 138 frigate, commissioned 1959 to 1964
- Graf von Götzen: commissioned 1914
- Graf Zeppelin: 28,000 ton Graf Zeppelin-class aircraft carrier, launched 1938 but never completed
- Granitz: Darss-class supply ship
- Gransee (313): Kondor-class minesweeper
- Grasort (D27): SK-64-class buoy tender
- Graudenz: Graudenz-class light cruiser, launched 1913
- Greif (1886): cruiser, launched 1886
- Greif (1914): auxiliary cruiser
- Greif (1926): torpedo boat
- Greif (S9): Seeadler-class (Type 141) fast attack craft, commissioned 1959 to 1976
- Greif (S66): Albatros-class (Type 143) fast attack craft, decommissioned
- Greif: air control ship
- Greifswald: Habicht-class minesweeper
- Greifswald (V814): Kondor-class minesweeper
- Greiz: Schwalbe-class minesweeper
- Grevesmühlen (213): Hai-class submarine chaser
- Grevesmühlen (212): Parchim-class corvette
- Grille: aviso, launched 1857
- Grille (1916): experimental craft
- Grille (1935): aviso, launched 1936
- Grimma (336): Kondor-class minesweeper
- Grimmen: Robbe-class landing craft
- Grimmen (616): Frosch I-class landing craft
- Grosser Kurfürst (1875): 6,800 ton Preussen-class ironclad, launched 1875
- Grosser Kurfürst (1913): 26,000 ton König-class battleship, launched 1913
- Großherzog von Oldenburg: corvette, launched 1848
- Grömitz: Frankenthal-class (Type 332) minehunter
- Güstrow: Schwalbe-class minesweeper
- Güstrow (223): Parchim-class corvette
- Gunther Plüschow: air control ship
- Gustav Nachtigal (1940): S-boat tender

== H ==
- Habicht (1860): gunboat, launched 1860
- Habicht (1879): gunboat, launched 1879
- Habicht (S26): Seeadler-class (Type 141) fast attack craft, commissioned 1959 to 1976
- Habicht (S69): Albatros-class (Type 143) fast attack craft, decommissioned
- Habicht: SO-I-class submarine chaser
- Häher (S18): Jaguar-class (Type 140) fast attack craft, commissioned 1960—1974
- Häher (S51): Tiger-class (Type 148) fast attack craft, decommissioned
- Hagen (1893): 3,700 ton Siegfried-class coastal defense ship, launched 1893
- Hagen (1921): training craft
- Hagenow: Schwalbe-class minesweeper
- Hagenow (632): Frosch I-class landing craft
- Hai (1935): escort vessel
- Hai: Type 240 submarine, former Kriegsmarine U-2365
- Hai: Type M-9-463 salvage tug
- Halle: Krake-class minesweeper
- Halle (143): Koni-class frigate
- Hamburg (1841): corvette, launched 1841
- Hamburg (cruiser): 3,300 ton Bremen-class light cruiser, launched 1903
- Hamburg (D181): Hamburg-class (Type 101A) destroyer, decommissioned
- Hamburg (F220): Sachsen-class (Type 124) frigate
- Hameln (1959): Vegesack-class (Type 321) minesweeper, commissioned 1959 to 1963
- Hameln (M1092): Ensdorf-class (Type 352) minesweeper
- Hanno Günther (845): P-6-class torpedo boat
- Hannover: 13,000 ton Deutschland-class battleship, launched 1905
- Hans Albrecht Wedel: air control ship; K-VI-class
- Hans Beimler (862): P-6-class torpedo boat
- Hans Beimler (575): Tarantul-class corvette
- Hans Bürkner (1961): support vessel
- Hans Christian Oderstedt (1943): experimental craft
- Hans Coppi (863): P-6-class torpedo boat
- Hans Coppi (812): Shershen-class torpedo boat
- Hans Lody (Z10): Type 1934A destroyer
- Hans Lüdemann (Z18): Type 1936 destroyer
- Hans Rolshoven: air control ship
- Hans Techel: Type 202 submarine
- Hansa (1847): frigate, launched 1847
- Hansa (1872): armoured corvette, launched 1872
- Hansa (1898): 5,700 ton Victoria Louise-class protected cruiser, launched 1898
- Hansa (auxiliary cruiser): 19,200 ton unique auxiliary merchant cruiser
- Hansa (1957): minesweeper
- Hansestadt Danzig: minelayer
- Harz (1953): tanker
- Harz: (H31): Ohre-class supply ship
- Havel (1919): tender
- Havelland (H51): Ohre-class supply ship
- Hay (1860): gunboat, launched 1860
- Hay (1881): gunboat, launched 1881
- Hay (1907): artillery tender and training vessel
- Hecht (1917): experimental craft
- Hecht: Type 240 submarine, former Kriegsmarine U-2367
- Heimdall: 3,700 ton Siegfried-class coastal defense ship, launched 1892
- Heimdall: training craft
- Heinrich Dorrenbach (711): Osa-class missile boat
- Heinz Kapelle (823): P-6-class torpedo boat
- Heinz Kapelle (811): Shershen-class torpedo boat
- Heinz Roggenkamp (1952): experimental craft
- Hela (1852): schooner, launched 1853
- Hela: 2,000 ton unique aviso, launched 1895
- Hela (1919): fleet tender
- Hela (1938): fleet tender
- Helgoland (battleship): 23,000 ton Helgoland-class battleship, launched 1909
- Helgoland (A1457): Helgoland-class (Type 720) tug, decommissioned 1997
- Heppens: harbour tug; Neuende-class
- Herbert Balzer (825): P-6-class torpedo boat
- Herbert Norkus (1939): sailing school ship
- Herkules (1960): minesweeper
- Hermann Künne (Z19): Type 1936 destroyer
- Hermann Schoemann (Z7): Type 1934A destroyer
- Hermann von Helmholtz (1943): experimental craft
- Hermann von Wissmann (1940): tender
- Hermelin (S38): Zobel-class (Type 142) fast attack craft, commissioned 1962—1983
- Hermelin (S73): Gepard-class (Type 143A) fast attack craft
- Hermes (ZG3): captured Greek destroyer Vasilefs Georgios
- Hermes: submarine chaser, launched 1960
- Herten: Kulmbach-class (Type 332) minehunter
- Hertha (1864): frigate, launched 1864
- Hertha: 5,700 ton Victoria Louise-class protected cruiser, launched 1897
- Hertha (1961): minesweeper
- Hessen (battleship): 13,000 ton Braunschweig-class battleship, launched 1903
- Hessen (D184): Hamburg-class (Type 101A) destroyer, decommissioned
- Hessen (F221): Sachsen-class (Type 124) frigate, commissioned 2006
- Hettstadt (315): Kondor-class minesweeper
- Hiddensee: Project 35 tanker
- Hiddensee: corvette; Tarantul-I-class
- Hildebrand: 3,700 ton Siegfried-class coastal defense ship, possibly not completed
- Hildebrand (1921): training craft
- Hille (1917): minesweeper tender
- Hindenburg: 27,000 ton Derfflinger-class battlecruiser, launched 1915
- Hipper: Black Swan-class frigate, former Royal Navy HMS Actaeon, commissioned 1959 to 1964
- Hohenzollern (1876): imperial yacht
- Hohenzollern (1892): imperial yacht
- Hohenzollern (1914): imperial yacht
- Holnis (1965): minesweeper
- Homburg: Frankenthal-class (Type 332) minehunter
- Horst Wessel: Sail training ship, launched 1936, became United States Coast Guard USCGC Eagle
- Hoyerswerda: Robbe-class landing craft
- Hoyerswerda (611): Frosch I-class landing craft
- Hugin (1917): training craft
- Hugin: Nasty class (Type 152) fast attack craft, commissioned 1960 to 1973
- Hugo Ecken (A114): Havanna-class air control vessel
- Hugo Zeye (1940): torpedo training vessel
- Hummel: armoured gunboat, launched 1881
- Hummel (1940): escort vessel
- Hyäne (1860): gunboat, launched 1860
- Hyäne (1878): gunboat, launched 1878
- Hyäne (S40): Zobel-class (Type 142) fast attack craft, commissioned 1963—1984
- Hyäne (S80): Gepard-class (Type 143A) fast attack craft
- Hydrograph: survey vessel

== I ==
- Ida (1859): armed steam ship
- Ill (1928): supply ship
- Ilmenau: Schwalbe-class minesweeper
- Iltis: gunboat
- Iltis (gunboat): Iltis-class gunboat, launched 4 August 1898, commissioned 1 December 1898 to 28 August 1914
- Iltis (1905): auxiliary cruiser
- Iltis (1927): torpedo boat
- Iltis (S2): Jaguar-class (Type 140) fast attack craft, commissioned 1957—1975
- Iltis (S42): Tiger-class (Type 148) fast attack craft, decommissioned
- Immelmann: air control ship; K V-class
- Inger: Barbe-class (Type 520) utility landing craft, used as transport ships (decommissioned)
- Irben (1935): mine-warfare vessel
- Irene: 5,000 ton Irene-class protected cruiser, launched 1887
- Isar (1930): submarine tender
- Isar: Mosel-class (Type 402) tender

== J ==
- Jade (1967): support ship
- Jäger: gunboat, launched 1860
- Jäger (1883): torpedo gunboat
- Jagd: aviso, launched 1888
- Jagd (1919): tender
- Jagd (1935): escort vessel
- Jaguar (gunboat): Iltis-class gunboat, launched 19 August 1898, commissioned 4 April 1899, scuttled 7 November 1914
- Jaguar (1928): torpedo boat
- Jaguar (S1): Jaguar-class (Type 140) fast attack craft, commissioned 1957 to 1973
- Jaguar (S47): Tiger-class (Type 148) fast attack craft, decommissioned
- Jasmund (K41): Darss-class survey vessel
- Jena: Schwalbe-class minesweeper
- Jeverland (1937): tanker
- Jeverland (1940): replenishment ship
- Joh. L. Krüger: Project RL 234 research vessel
- Johann Wittenborg: experimental craft; Minesweeper 1916
- Jordan: survey vessel
- Jordan: survey vessel
- Josef Römer: P-6-class torpedo boat
- Josef Schares (753): Osa-class missile boat
- Jüterbog (342): Kondor-class minesweeper
- Juist (1968): diver training vessel
- Juist: Wangerooge-class (Type 722) tug
- Julius Adler: P-6-class torpedo boat
- Juminda (1894): mine warfare vessel
- Jungingen (1919): tender
- Jupiter (1874): harbour craft, launched 1874
- Jupiter (1944): minesweeper
- Jupiter (1961): minesweeper

== K ==
- Kärnten (1914): supply ship
- Kaiser: Agamemnon-class
- Kaiser (1874): 7,600 ton Kaiser-class ironclad, launched 1874
- Kaiser (1911): 25,000 ton Kaiser-class battleship, launched 1911
- Kaiser: mine-warfare ship
- Kaiser Barbarossa: 11,600 ton Kaiser Friedrich III-class battleship, launched 1900
- Kaiser Friedrich III: 11,600 ton Kaiser Friedrich III-class battleship, launched 1896
- Kaiser Karl der Grosse: 11,600 ton Kaiser Friedrich III-class battleship, launched 1899
- Kaiser Wilhelm II: 11,600 ton Kaiser Friedrich III-class battleship, launched 1897
- Kaiser Wilhelm der Grosse (1897): auxiliary cruiser
- Kaiser Wilhelm der Grosse: 11,600 ton Kaiser Friedrich III-class battleship, launched 1899
- Kaiseradler (1876): aviso
- Kaiseradler (1892): light cruiser, later renamed Seeadler
- Kaiserin: 25,000 ton Kaiser-class battleship, launched 1911
- Kaiserin Augusta: 6,000 ton unique heavy cruiser, launched 1892
- Kalkgrund II: Schooner lightship, built 1910
- Kalkgrund: experimental craft; Stollergrund-class
- Karl F. Gauss: survey vessel
- Karl Galster (Z20): Type 1936 destroyer
- Karl Kolls (1903): experimental craft
- Kamerun: Norwegian minesweeper HNoMS Rauma captured in April 1940, re-designated as Vorpostenboot, later to minelayer.
- Kamenz Schwalbe-class minesweeper
- Kamenz (S321): Kondor-class minesweeper
- Karl Liebknecht (123): Riga-class frigate
- Karl Marx (142): Riga-class frigate
- Karl Meseberg (733): Osa-class missile boat
- Karl-Marx-Stadt Krake-class minesweeper
- Karl Meyer: air control ship; K V-class
- Karlsruhe (1912): Karlsruhe-class light cruiser, launched 1912
- Karlsruhe (1916): Königsberg-class light cruiser, launched 1916
- Karlsruhe (1927): 7,200 ton Königsberg-class light cruiser, launched 1927
- Karlsruhe (F223): Köln-class frigate
- Karlsruhe (F212): Bremen-class (Type 122) frigate
- Karpfen: Barbe-class (Type 520) utility landing craft, used as transport ships (decommissioned)
- Kehrwieder: mine-warfare ships; Minesweeper 1916
- Kiebitz (1938): mine warfare vessel
- Kiel: paddle steamer
- Kirchdorf (G425): Kondor-class minesweeper
- Klütz (G416): Kondor-class minesweeper
- Knechtsand: harbour tug; Lütje Hörn-class
- Knechtsand: harbour tug; Nordstrand-class
- Koblenz (M1071): Lindau-class (Type 320) minesweeper, commissioned 1958 to 1975, upgraded to Type 331
- Koblenz: Fulda-class (Type 331, upgraded Type 320 Lindau-class) minesweepers, commissioned 1978 to 1999
- Köln (cruiser): 7,200 ton Königsberg-class light cruiser, launched 1928
- Köln (F220): Köln-class (Type 120) frigate, commissioned 1961 to 1982
- Köln (F211): Bremen-class (Type 122) frigate
- König: 26,000 ton König-class battleship, launched 1913
- König Albert: 25,000 ton Kaiser-class battleship, launched 1912
- König Wilhelm: unique armoured frigate, 9,700 tons, launched 1868; rebuilt 1897 into heavy cruiser
- Königin Luise (1913): auxiliary mine warfare vessel
- Königin Luise (1934): mine warfare vessel
- Königin Luise (1935): escort vessel
- Königsberg (1905): Königsberg-class light cruiser, launched 1905
- Königsberg (1915): Königsberg-class light cruiser, launched 1915
- Königsberg (1927): 7,200 ton Königsberg-class light cruiser, launched 1925
- Köthen Schwalbe-class minesweeper
- Kolberg: 4,400 ton Kolberg-class light cruiser, launched 1908
- Kollicker Ort (D116): SK-64-class buoy tender
- Komet (1913): remote control craft
- Komet: 7,500 ton unique auxiliary merchant cruise
- Komet Kondor-class minesweeper
- Kondor (1926): torpedo boat
- Kondor (S8): Seeadler-class (Type 141) fast attack craft, commissioned 1959 to 1976
- Kondor (S67): Albatros-class (Type 143) fast attack craft, decommissioned
- Konstanz: Lindau-class (Type 320) minesweeper, commissioned 1959 to 1980, upgraded to Type 351 and recommissioned 1989 to 2000
- Kormoran (auxiliary cruiser): 19,000 ton unique auxiliary merchant cruiser
- Kormoran (S28): Seeadler-class (Type 141) fast attack craft, commissioned 1959 to 1976
- Kormoran (S70): Albatros-class (Type 143) fast attack craft, decommissioned
- Kormoran (A68): Zander-class salvage tug
- Kormoran SO-I-class submarine chaser
- Kranich (S16): Jaguar-class (Type 140) fast attack craft, commissioned 1959 to 1973
- Kranich (S60): Tiger-class (Type 148) fast attack craft, decommissioned
- Kranich SO-I-class submarine chaser
- Krebs: Krebs-class (Type 340) minesweeper, commissioned 1959 to 1973
- Kreta: fighter control vessel
- Krischan der Große: anti-aircraft vessel
- Krischan II (from 1936 Gunther Plüschow): air control ship
- Krischan III (from 1936 Bernhard von Tschirschk): air control ship
- Krischan: air control ship
- Kriemhild (1939): Danube escort craft
- Krokodil: Eidechse-class landing craft
- Krokodill (1994): landing craft
- Kronprinz (1867): Unique ironclad, commissioned September 1867
- Kronprinz: (battleship): 26,000 ton König-class battleship, renamed Kronprinz Wilhelm in 1918
- Kronprinz Wilhelm (auxiliary cruiser): 24,900 ton auxiliary cruiser, built as a civilian liner in 1901, commissioned as an auxiliary cruiser in 1914, surrendered to the US in 1915
- Kühlung (P441): Darss-class support ship
- Kühlungsborn (GS07): Kondor-class minesweeper
- Kühn: torpedo boat
- Kulmbach: Kulmbach-class (Type 332) minehunter
- Kurfürst Friedrich Wilhelm: 10,500 ton Brandenburg-class battleship, launched 1891
- Kyritz (321): Kondor-class minesweeper

== L ==
- Laboe: Kulmbach-class (Type 332) minehunter, decommissioned 28 March 2012
- Lachs: Barbe-class (Type 520) utility landing craft, used as transport ships
- Lahn: Lahn-class (Type 403) tender
- Landtief (D115): SK-64-class buoy tender
- Langeness: harbour tug; Lütje Hörn-class
- Langeness: harbour tug; Nordstrand-class
- Langeoog: Wangerooge-class (Type 722) tug
- Lauenburg: weather ship
- Leberecht Maass (Z1): Type 1934 destroyer
- Lech: submarine tender
- Lech: Lahn-class (Type 403) tender
- Leipzig: Leipzig-class corvette, launched 1875
- Leipzig: 3,300 ton Bremen-class light cruiser, launched 1905
- Leipzig: Cöln-class cruiser, launched 1918, not completed
- Leipzig (1929): 8,000 ton Leipzig-class cruiser, launched 1929
- Leipzig : Krake-class minesweeper
- Leitholm: buoy tender
- Leopard: auxiliary cruiser
- Leopard: torpedo boat; Raubtier-class
- Leopard: torpedo boat; Sleipner-class
- Leopard (S5): Jaguar-class (Type 140) fast attack craft, commissioned 1958—1973
- Leopard (S45): Tiger-class (Type 148) fast attack craft, decommissioned
- Libben (V661): Kondor-class torpedo recovery vessel
- Lindau (M1072): Lindau-class (Type 320) minesweeper, commissioned 1958 to 1975, upgraded to Type 331
- Lindau: Fulda-class (Type 331, upgraded Type 320 Lindau-class) minesweepers, commissioned 1978 to 2000
- Linz: mine-warfare ships
- Löwe: bewaffneter Raddampfer
- SMS Loreley (1859): aviso, launched 1859
- SMS Loreley (1885): gunboat, launched 1885
- Loreley: Stationsschiff
- Loreley: Minesweeper; Frauenlob-class
- Lothringen: Mine-warfare ships
- Lothringen: 13,000 ton Braunschweig-class battleship, launched 1904
- Löwe (1938): Norwegian Sleipner-class destroyer HNoMS Gyller captured on 9 April 1940, re-designated as torpedo boat.
- Löwe (S12): Jaguar-class (Type 140) fast attack craft, commissioned 1959—1975
- Löwe (S48): Tiger-class (Type 148) fast attack craft, decommissioned
- Luchs (1899): Gunboat, launched 18 October 1899, commissioned 15 April 1900, blown up 28 August 1914
- Luchs: torpedo boat; Raubtier-class
- Luchs (S4): Jaguar-class (Type 140) fast attack craft, commissioned 1958—1972
- Luchs (S43): Tiger-class (Type 148) fast attack craft, decommissioned
- Luckenwalde Schwalbe-class minesweeper
- Ludwigshafen am Rhein: Braunschweig-class (Type 130) corvette, commissioned 2013
- Ludwigslust (247): Hai-class submarine chaser
- Ludwigslust (232): Parchim-class corvette
- Lübben : Robbe-class landing craft
- Lübben (631): Frosch I-class landing craft
- Lübeck (1844): corvette, launched 1844
- Lübeck (cruiser): 3,300 ton Bremen-class light cruiser, launched 1904
- Lübeck (F224): Köln-class (Type 120) frigate, commissioned 1963 to 1988
- Lübeck (F214): Bremen-class (Type 122) frigate
- Lübz (246): Hai-class submarine chaser
- Lübz (221): Parchim-class corvette
- Lüneburg: Lüneburg-class (Type 701) replenishment ship
- Lütje Hörn: harbour tug; Lütje Hörn-class
- Lütje Hörn: harbour tug; Nordstrand-class
- Lütjens: Lütjens-class (Type 103B) destroyer, decommissioned
- Lützow (battlecruiser): 27,000 ton Derfflinger-class battlecruiser, launched 1913
- Lützow (1939): 14,000 ton modified Admiral Hipper-class heavy cruiser, sold before completion to Soviet Union in 1939, never commissioned
- Lützow (1940): 12,000 ton Deutschland-class heavy cruiser, renamed from Deutschland in 1939
- Lützow (1941): fishing vessel built at Seebeckwerft req' by DKM as Vorpostenboote (V1102) 1943 to 1945, after which returned to commercial service
- Luise: corvette, launched 1872
- Lumme (923): Diving vessel

== M ==
- Mackensen: Mackensen-class battlecruiser, launched 1917, not completed
- Magdeburg (cruiser): Magdeburg-class light cruiser, launched 1911
- Magdeburg (1917): Cöln-class cruiser, launched 1917
- Magdeburg, Krake-class minesweeper
- Magdeburg (F261): Braunschweig-class (Type 130) corvette, launched 2006, commissioned 2008
- Main: Rhein-class (Type 401) tender
- Main (A515): Elbe-class (Type 404) replenishment ship
- Mainz: 4,400 ton Kolberg-class light cruiser, launched 1909
- Makrele: Barbe-class (Type 520) utility landing craft, used as transport ships (decommissioned)
- Malchin (GS03): Kondor-class minesweeper
- Marburg (M1080): Lindau-class (Type 320) minesweeper, commissioned 1959 to 1976, upgraded to Type 331
- Marburg: Fulda-class (Type 331, upgraded Type 320 Lindau-class) minesweepers, commissioned 1979 to 2000
- Marder (S14): Jaguar-class (Type 140) fast attack craft, commissioned 1959—1972
- Marder (S44): Tiger-class (Type 148) fast attack craft, decommissioned
- Marie: corvette, launched 1881
- Markgraf: 26,000 ton König-class battleship, launched 1913
- Mars: Krebs-class (Type 340) minesweeper, commissioned 1961—1992)
- Max Reichpietsch (751): Osa-class missile boat
- Max Roscher (846): P-6-class torpedo boat
- Max Schultz (Z3): Type 1934 destroyer
- Mecklenburg: 12,000 ton Wittelsbach-class battleship, launched 1901
- Mecklenburg, buoy tender
- Mecklenburg-Vorpommern: Brandenburg-class (Type 123) frigate
- Medusa (1864): corvette, launched 1864
- Medusa: 2,700 ton Gazelle-class light cruiser
- Meersburg: Lüneburg-class (Type 701) replenishment ship
- Meiningen, Schwalbe-class minesweeper
- Meissen, Schwalbe-class minesweeper
- Mercur: corvette, launched 1847
- Meteor (1865): gunboat, launched 1865
- Meteor (1890): aviso, launched 1890
- Meteor (1915): gunboat, launched 1915
- Meteor, Kondor-class survey vessel
- Michel: 11,000 ton unique auxiliary merchant cruiser
- Minden (M1085): Lindau-class (Type 320) minesweeper, commissioned 1960 to 1975, upgraded to Type 331
- Minden: Fulda-class (Type 331, upgraded Type 320 Lindau-class) minesweepers, commissioned 1978 to 1997
- Mira: Krebs-class (Type 340) minesweeper, commissioned 1960—1973) is for sale click for details: – here
- Mölders: Lütjens-class (Type 103B) destroyer, decommissioned
- Mönchgut (E111): Darss-class supply ship
- Möwe, SO-I-class submarine chaser
- Möwe: gunboat, launched 1879
- Möwe: auxiliary cruiser
- Moltke: 3,000 ton Bismarck-class corvette, launched 1877
- Moltke: 23,000 ton Moltke-class battlecruiser, launched 1910
- Mosel: 238 ton Rhein-class monitor, launched 1872
- Mosel: Mosel-class (Type 402) tender
- Mosel (A512): Elbe-class (Type 404) replenishment ship
- Mosel (1912): ex Frieda, builder F. Lemm, commandeered 1936 as a Unterseebootstender. Mined off Windau 1941
- Mühlhausen: Type 742 diver support ship
- München: 3,300 ton Bremen-class light cruiser, launched 1904
- Munin: Nasty class (Type 152) fast attack craft, commissioned 1960 to 1964
- Muräne: Barbe-class (Type 520) utility landing craft, used as transport ships (decommissioned)
- Musquito: brigg, launched 1851

== N ==
- Najade: submarine chaser; Thetis-class
- Nassau: 19,000 ton Nassau-class battleship, launched 1908
- Natter (1860): gunboat, launched 1860
- Natter (1880): armoured gunboat, launched 1880
- Natter: submarine chaser
- Natter: Otter-class
- Nauen: Schwalbe-class minesweeper
- Nautilus (1871): gunboat, launched 1871
- Nautilus (1906): 2,000 ton Nautilus-class minelayer, launched 1907
- Nautilus: experimental craft; minesweeper 1915
- Nautilus: minesweeper; Frauenlob-class
- Neckar: Rhein-class (Type 401) tender
- Neiße: submarine tender
- Neptun: minesweeper; Schütze-class
- Nerz (S34): Zobel-class (Type 142) fast attack craft, commissioned 1963—1982
- Nerz (S74): Gepard-class (Type 143A) fast attack craft
- Nettelbeck: minesweeper
- Neubrandenburg: Habicht-class minesweeper
- Neubrandenburg (633): Frosch I-class landing craft
- Neuende: harbour tug; Neuende-class
- Neuruppin (345): Kondor-class minesweeper
- Neumark: Neumark-class
- Neuwerk: harbour tug; Sylt-class
- Neustrelitz (G412): Kondor-class minesweeper
- Niedersachsen: mine-warfare ships
- Niedersachsen: Bremen-class (Type 122) frigate
- Nienburg: supply ship; Lüneburg-class
- Niobe (1849): schooner, launched 1849
- Niobe (cruiser): 2,700 ton Gazelle-class light cruiser
- Niobe: Sail training ship, launched 1913
- Niobe: training vessel, Holland-class
- Niobe: experimental craft
- Nix: aviso, launched 1850
- Nixe: corvette, launched 1885
- Nixe: minesweeper; Ariadne-class
- Norderney: Wangerooge-class (Type 722) tug, decommissioned
- Nordperd (E171): Frosch II-class replenishment vessel
- Nordsee: tender
- Nordstern: tanker
- Nordstrand: harbour tug; Lütje-Hörn-class
- Nordstrand: harbour tug; Nordstrand-class
- Nordwind: sail training vessel; Kriegsfischkutter; border guard
- Notus: torpedo boat, tug
- Novara: frigate
- Nürnberg (1906): Königsberg-class light cruiser, launched 1906
- Nürnberg (1916): Königsberg-class light cruiser, launched 1916
- Nürnberg (cruiser): 8,000 ton Leipzig-class cruiser, launched 1934, became Soviet Admiral Makarov
- Nymphe (1863): corvette, launched 1863
- Nymphe (1899) (cruiser): 2,700 ton Gazelle-class light cruiser
- Nymphe (coastal defense ship): Norwegian Tordenskjold-class coastal defence ship HNoMS Tordenskjold captured in April 1940, re-designated as Flak ship.

== O ==
- Odenwald: Westerwald-class (Type 760) ammunition transport ship, decommissioned
- Odin: 3,700 ton Odin-class coastal defense ship, launched 1894
- Odin: Odin-class
- Odin: minesweeper, Vorpostenboot; fish trawler
- Offenburg: Lüneburg-class (Type 701) replenishment ship
- Oker: Oste-class (Type 423) fleet service, surveillance, and ELINT ship
- Oker: Oker-class
- Oldenburg (1884): 5,250 ton unique coastal armored ship, launched 1884
- Oldenburg: 23,000 ton Helgoland-class battleship, launched 1910
- Oldenburg: mine-warfare ships; Sesia-class
- Oldenburg (F263): Braunschweig-class (Type 130) corvette, commissioned 2013
- Olga: Training ship
- Oranienburg (341): Kondor-class minesweeper
- Orion (auxiliary cruiser): 15,000 ton unique auxiliary merchant cruiser
- Orion: R-boat
- Orion (minesweeper): Krebs-class (Type 340) minesweeper, commissioned 1962—1990
- Oste: tender, Faettenfjord-class
- Oste: Oste-class (Type 423) fleet service, surveillance, and ELINT ship
- Ostfriesland: 23,000 ton Helgoland-class battleship, launched 1909
- Ostmark: seaplane tender
- Ostmark: mine-warfare ships
- Ostseeland (II): representation yacht
- Ostseeland: representation yacht; Kondor-II-class
- Oswald: tender, Seaplane tender
- Otter (1877): gunboat, launched 1877
- Otter (1909): river gunboat, launched 1909
- Otter: mine-warfare ship; Irben-class
- Otter: Otter-class
- Otto Braun: experimental craft; Minesweeper 1916
- Otto Tost (731): Osa-class missile boat
- Otto von Guericke (A46): Piast-class salvage tug
- Otto Wünsche: submarine tender; Wilhelm-Bauer-class
- Ozelot (S37): Zobel-class (Type 142) fast attack craft, commissioned 1963—1984
- Ozelot (S78): Gepard-class (Type 143A) fast attack craft

== P ==
- Paderborn: Lindau-class (Type 320) minesweeper, commissioned 1958 to 1979, upgraded to Type 351, recommissioned 1989 to 2000
- Palmer Ort (D39): SK-64-class buoy tender
- Panther (gunboat): Iltis-class gunboat, launched 1 April 1901, commissioned 15 March 1903, sold 1931, scrapped
- Panther (destroyer), Norwegian Sleipner-class destroyer HNoMS Odin captured on 9 April 1940, re-designated as torpedo boat.
- Panther (S24): Jaguar-class (Type 140) fast attack craft, commissioned 1958—1973
- Panther (S50): Tiger-class (Type 148) fast attack craft, decommissioned
- Parchim (215): Hai-class submarine chaser
- Parchim (242): Parchim-class corvette
- Pasewalk (GS05): Kondor-class minesweeper
- Passat: mine-warfare ships, supply ship
- Passat: harbour tug; Klasse 729
- Passau (minesweeper): Vegesack-class (Type 321) minesweeper, commissioned 1960 to 1963
- Passau (M1096): Kulmbach-class (Type 332) minehunter
- Paul Eisenschneider (574): Tarantul-class corvette
- Paul Eisenschneider (713): Osa-class missile boat
- Paul Jakobi (Z5): Type 1934A destroyer
- Paul Schulz (752): Osa-class missile boat
- Paul Wieczorek (754): Osa-class missile boat
- Pegasus: minesweeper; R-boat
- Pegasus: minesweeper; Schütze-class
- Pegnitz: Ensdorf-class (Type 352) minesweeper
- Pelikan: transport, mine-warfare ships, RM
- Pelikan: experimental craft; Minesweeper 1915
- Pelikan (S30): Jaguar-class (Type 140) fast attack craft, commissioned 1960—1974
- Pelikan (S53): Tiger-class (Type 148) fast attack craft, decommissioned
- Pellworm: harbour tug; Klasse 729
- Perleberg (245): Hai-class submarine chaser
- Perleberg (243): Parchim-class corvette
- Perseus: minesweeper; Schütze-class
- Peter Strasser: 28,000 ton Graf Zeppelin-class aircraft carrier, never launched
- Pfälzerland: transport; Klasse 785
- Pfeil (1860): gunboat, launched 1860
- Pfeil: aviso, launched 1882
- Pfeil: Vosper (Type 153) fast attack craft, commissioned 1962—1965
- Phoenix: air control ship
- Piercer: customs cutter
- Pillau: Pillau-class light cruiser, launched 1914
- Pinguin (auxiliary cruiser): 17,600 ton unique auxiliary merchant cruiser
- Pinguin (S22): Jaguar-class (Type 140) fast attack craft, commissioned 1961—1973
- Pinguin (S58): Tiger-class (Type 148) fast attack craft, decommissioned
- Pionier: sea cutter
- Planet: survey vessel; Planet-class
- Planet: research vessel
- Planet: research vessel
- Planet: Planet-class research ship (Type 752), commissioned 2005
- Plön: harbour tug; Klasse 729
- Plötze: Barbe-class (Type 520) utility landing craft, used as transport ships (decommissioned)
- Pluto: minesweeper; Schütze-class
- Poel: Project 35 tanker
- Pössneck: Schwalbe-class minesweeper
- Pollux: minesweeper; Schütze-class
- Pollux: Krebs-class (Type 340) minesweeper, commissioned 1961—1992)
- Pommern: mine-warfare ships
- Preußen: mine-warfare ships
- Preußen: mine-warfare ships
- Pommerania: aviso, launched 1864
- Pommern: 13,000 ton Deutschland-class battleship, launched 1905
- Posen: 19,000 ton Nassau-class battleship, launched 1908
- Potsdam: Krake-class minesweeper
- Prenzlau: Project 2 training ship
- Prenzlau: Schwalbe-class minesweeper
- Prenzlau (231): Parchim-class corvette
- Prerow (G413): Kondor-class minesweeper
- Preussen (1873): 6,800 ton Preussen-class ironclad, launched 1873
- Preussen (1903): 13,000 ton Braunschweig-class battleship, launched 1903
- Preussischer Adler: aviso, launched 1846
- Prinz Adalbert (1865): Unique ironclad, originally ordered by the Confederate States Navy
- Prinz Adalbert (1876): corvette, launched 1876
- Prinz Adalbert (1901): 9,000 ton Prinz Adalbert-class armored cruiser, 1901
- Prinz Eitel Friedrich: cruiser
- Prinz Eugen: 14,000 ton modified Admiral Hipper-class heavy cruiser, launched 1938
- Prinz Heinrich: 9,000 ton unique armored cruiser, 1900
- Prinzess Wilhelm: cruiser, launched 1887
- Prinzregent Luitpold: 25,000 ton Kaiser-class battleship, launched 1911
- Pritzwalk (325): Kondor-class minesweeper
- Puma (S39): Zobel-class (Type 142) fast attack craft, commissioned 1962—1981
- Puma (S72): Gepard-class (Type 143A) fast attack craft
- Putlos: Todendorf-class

== R ==
- Ranzow (D114): SK-64-class buoy tender
- Rathenow (326): Kondor-class minesweeper
- Raubmöve: Schnellboot fast attack craft, commissioned 1956—1967
- Raule: R-boat tender, minesweeper
- Raule: Hunt-class frigate, former Royal Navy HMS Albrighton, commissioned through 1967
- Regensburg: Graudenz-class light cruiser, launched 1914
- Regulus: minesweeper; Schütze-class
- Regulus: Krebs-class (Type 340) minesweeper, commissioned 1962—1990)
- Reiher: launched 1909 as freighter, minesweeper, 1939-1945
- Reiher: launched 1938 as freighter & passenger liner, command ship, 1939-945
- Reiher: SO-I-class submarine chaser
- Reiher (S20): Jaguar-class (Type 140) fast attack craft, commissioned 1960—1973
- Reiher (S59): Tiger-class (Type 148) fast attack craft, decommissioned
- Renke: Landing craft, decommissioned
- Rendsburg: armed trawler
- Renown: artillery training vessel
- Rerik (G426): Kondor-class minesweeper
- Restaurador: gun boat
- Rhein: mine steamer; Rhein-class
- Rhein: mine transport; Irben-class
- Rhein: 238 ton Rhein-class monitor, launched 1872
- Rhein: Rhein-class (Type 401) tender
- Rhein (A513): Elbe-class (Type 404) replenishment ship
- Rheinland: 19,000 ton Nassau-class battleship, launched 1908
- Rheinland-Pfalz: Bremen-class (Type 122) frigate
- Rhön: Rhön-class (Type 704) tanker
- Ribnitz-Damgarten (216): Hai-class submarine chaser
- Ribnitz-Damgarten (233): Parchim-class
- Richard Beitzen (Z4): Type 1934 destroyer
- Richthofen: air control ship; K-VI-class
- Riems: Project 35 tanker
- Riesa (322): Kondor-class minesweeper
- Rigel: minesweeper; R-boatder WM
- Rigel: minesweeper; Schütze-class
- Rival: torpedo boat, tug
- Robbe: Type M-9-463
- Rochen: Barbe-class (Type 520) utility landing craft, used as transport ships (decommissioned)
- Röbel (324): Kondor-class minesweeper
- Roland: mine-warfare ships
- Rommel: Lütjens-class (Type 103B) destroyer, decommissioned
- Roon: 10,000 ton Roon-class armored cruiser, launched 1903
- Rosslau (V813): Kondor-class minesweeper
- Rostock: Karlsruhe-class light cruiser, launched 1912
- Rostock (1918): Cöln-class cruiser, launched 1918, not completed
- Rostock: Krake-class minesweeper
- Rostock (141): Koni-class frigate
- Rottweil: Frankenthal-class (Type 332) minehunter
- Rover: brigg, launched 1853
- Ruden: Project RL 235 supply ship
- Rudi André (824): P-6-class torpedo boat
- Rudolf Breitscheid (842): P-6-class torpedo boat
- Rudolf Breitscheid (852): Shershen-class torpedo boat
- Rudolf Diesel: experimental craft; YMS-class* Rudolf Eglhofer (572): Tarantul-class corvette
- Rudolf Eglhofer (751): Osa-class missile boat
- Rugard: R-boat tender
- Ruhr: Rhein-class (Type 401) tender

== S ==
- S113: Großes Torpedoboot 1916 class, launched 1918
- Saar: submarine tender
- Saar: Mosel-class (Type 402) tender
- Saarburg: Lüneburg-class (Type 701) replenishment ship
- Sachsen (1877): 7,800 ton Sachsen-class ironclad, launched 1877
- Sachsen (1916): 29,000 ton Bayern-class battleship, not completed
- Sachsen (F219): Sachsen-class (Type 124) frigate
- Sachsenwald: mine transport, Sachsenwald-class
- Salamander (1850): aviso, launched 1850
- Salamander (1860): gunboat, launched 1860
- Salamander (1880): armoured gunboat, launched 1880
- Salamander: landing craft; Eidechse-class
- Salm: Landing craft, decommissioned
- Santa Elena: seaplane tender
- Sassnitz (91): Sassnitz-class missile boat
- Sassnitz: Habicht-class minesweeper
- Saturn: minesweeper; R-boat
- Sauerland: transport; Klasse 785
- Schamien: river gunboat
- Scharf: torpedo boat; Schütze-class
- Scharhörn: harbour tug; Lütje-Hörn-class
- Scharhörn: harbour tug; Nordstrand-class
- Scharnhorst (armored cruiser): 11,600 ton Scharnhorst-class armored cruiser, launched 1906
- Scharnhorst (battleship): 35,000 ton Scharnhorst-class battleship, launched 1936
- Scharnhorst (F 213): Black Swan-class frigate, former Royal Navy HMS Mermaid, commissioned 1959 to 1968
- Scheer: Type 138 frigate, commissioned 1959 to 1967
- Schlei: Barbe-class (Type 520) utility landing craft, used as transport ships
- Schlesien: 13,000 ton Deutschland-class battleship, launched 1906
- Schleswig: Lindau-class (Type 320) minesweeper, commissioned 1958 to 1979, upgraded to Type 351, recommissioned 1989 to 2000
- Schleswig-Holstein (battleship): 13,000 ton Deutschland-class battleship, launched 1906
- Schleswig-Holstein (D182): Hamburg-class (Type 101A) destroyer, decommissioned
- Schleswig-Holstein (F216): Brandenburg-class (Type 123) frigate
- Schneewittchen: torpedo boat, station yacht
- Schönebeck (314): Kondor-class minesweeper
- Schütze: torpedo boat; Schütze-class
- Schütze: minesweeper; Schütze-class
- Schwaben: 12,000 ton Wittelsbach-class battleship, launched 1901
- Schwabenland: seaplane tender
- Schwalbe (1860): gunboat, launched 1860
- Schwalbe: cruiser, launched 1887
- Schwarzwald: Schwarzwald-class (Type 706) replenishment ship
- Schwedt: Robbe-class landing craft
- Schwedt (636): Frosch-I-class landing craft
- Schwerin: troop transport, mine-warfare ships
- Schwerin: Habicht-class minesweeper
- Schwerin (612): Frosch-I-class landing craft
- Scorpion (1860): gunboat, launched 1860
- Scorpion (1877): armoured gunboat, launched 1877
- Sedan: Leipzig-class corvette
- Seeadler (cruiser): 1,650 ton Bussard-class light cruiser, launched 1892
- Seeadler: torpedo boat; Raubvogel-class
- Seeadler (S6): Seeadler-class (Type 141) fast attack craft, commissioned 1958 to 1976
- Seeadler (S68): Albatros-class (Type 143) fast attack craft, decommissioned
- Seehund: minesweeper; Seelöwe-class
- Seeigel: minesweeper; Seelöwe-class
- Seelöwe: minesweeper; Seelöwe-class
- Seepferd: minesweeper; Seelöwe-class
- Seeschlange: minesweeper; Seelöwe-class
- Seeschwalbe: fast attack craft; Silbermöwe-class
- Seestern: minesweeper; Seelöwe-class
- Senftenberg: Schwalbe-class minesweeper
- Seydlitz (battlecruiser): 25,000 ton unique battlecruiser, launched 1912
- Seydlitz (cruiser): 14,000 ton modified Admiral Hipper-class heavy cruiser, selected while under construction for conversion to an aircraft carrier, never completed
- Siegburg: Ensdorf-class (Type 352) minesweeper
- Siegen: Vegesack-class (Type 321) minesweeper, commissioned 1960 to 1963
- Siegfried: 3,700 ton Siegfried-class coastal defense ship, launched 1889
- Sicher: torpedo boat; Schütze-class
- Sigfrid: minesweeper, Vorpostenboot; fish trawler
- Silbermöve: Schnellboot fast attack craft, commissioned 1956 to 1967
- Sinop: battleship, launched 1878
- Sirius: minesweeper; Schütze-class
- Sirius: Krebs-class (Type 340) minesweeper, commissioned 1961 to 1990
- Skagerrak: mine-warfare ships
- Skorpion: Führer- und Wohnschiff für Vorpostenboote; erbeutete britische Personenfähre
- Skorpion: minesweeper; R-boat
- Skorpion: minesweeper; Schütze-class
- Sleipner: torpedo boat, RM
- Solidarität: sea cutter
- Sömmerda (311): Kondor-class minesweeper
- Sonneberg: Schwalbe-class minesweeper
- Sophie: corvette, launched 1881
- Sovetskaya Ukraina: Captured from the Soviet Union under construction, not completed
- Sperber (1860): gunboat, launched 1860
- Sperber: cruiser, launched 1888
- Sperber: seaplane tender; Luftwaffe
- Sperber: SO-I-class submarine chaser
- Sperber (S27): Seeadler-class (Type 141) fast attack craft, commissioned 1959 to 1976
- Sperber (S65): Albatros-class (Type 143) fast attack craft, decommissioned
- Spessart: Rhön-class (Type 704) tanker
- Spica: training vessel
- Spica: minesweeper; Schütze-class
- Spica: Krebs-class (Type 340) minesweeper, commissioned 1961 to 1992
- Spiekeroog: Wangerooge-class (Type 722) tug
- Steigerwald: mine transport, Sachsenwald-class
- Stein: 3,000 ton Bismarck-class corvette, launched 1879
- Steinbock: minesweeper; Schütze-class
- Stendal: Schwalbe-class minesweeper
- Sternberg: Schwalbe-class minesweeper
- Sternberg (212: Hai-class submarine chaser
- Stettin: Königsberg-class light cruiser, launched 1907
- Stier: 11,000 ton unique auxiliary merchant cruiser
- Stier: minesweeper, mine diving vessel Schütze-class
- Stör: Barbe-class (Type 520) utility landing craft, used as transport ships (decommissioned)
- Störtebeker: experimental craft; Minesweeper 1916
- Stollergrund: experimental craft; Stollergrund-class
- Storch (S17): Jaguar-class (Type 140) fast attack craft, commissioned 1960 to 1974
- Storch (S52): Tiger-class (Type 148) fast attack craft, decommissioned
- Stosch: 3,000 ton Bismarck-class corvette, launched 1877
- Strahl: Vosper (Type 153) fast attack craft, commissioned 1962 to 1967
- Stralsund (1816): schooner, launched 1816
- Stralsund: Magdeburg-class light cruiser, launched 1911
- Strahl: experimental craft
- Stralsund: mine-warfare ships
- Stralsund: Habicht-class minesweeper
- Stralsund (334): Kondor-class minesweeper
- Strasburg (346): Kondor-class minesweeper
- Strassburg: Magdeburg-class light cruiser, launched 1911
- Strelasund (V662): Kondor-class torpedo recovery vessel
- Stubbenkammer: Sperling-class buoy tender
- Sturmmöve: Schnellboot fast attack craft, commissioned 1956—1967
- Stuttgart: Königsberg-class light cruiser, launched 1906
- Südperd (E172): Frosch-II-class replenishment vessel
- Suhl: Habicht-class minesweeper
- Sulzbach-Rosenberg: Frankenthal-class (Type 332) minehunter
- Sylt: harbour tug; Sylt-class

== T ==
- Taku: minesweeper 1916
- Tanga: E-boat tender
- Tangerhütte (333): Kondor-class minesweeper
- Tannenberg: mine-warfare ships
- Tapfer: torpedo boat; Schütze-class
- Taucher I: K11 Project 24 diving vessel
- Taucher II: K47/K74: Project 24 diving vessel
- Tegernsee: Walchensee-class (Type 703) small coastal tanker
- Templin (GS06): Kondor-class minesweeper
- Teterow (241: Hai-class submarine chaser
- Teterow (234): Parchim-class corvette
- Thale: Project 17
- Theodor Riedel (Z6): Type 1934A destroyer
- Thetis (1846): frigate, launched 1846
- Thetis (cruiser): 2,700 ton Gazelle-class light cruiser
- Thetis (Flak ship): Norwegian Tordenskjold-class coastal defence ship HNoMS Harald Haarfagre captured in April 1940, re-designated as Flak ship.
- Theseus: submarine chaser; Thetis-class
- Thetis: submarine chaser; Thetis-class
- Thor: 10,000 ton unique auxiliary merchant cruiser
- Thielbek: 2,800 ton Converted from freighter to transport ship, sunk 1945
- Thorn: river gunboat, launched 1826
- Thüringen: 23,000 ton Helgoland-class battleship, launched 1909
- Tiger (1860): gunboat, launched 1860
- Tiger (gunboat): Iltis-class gunboat, launched 15 August 1899, commissioned 3 April 1900, scuttled 29 October 1914
- Tiger: torpedo boat; Raubtier-class
- Tiger (1940), Norwegian Sleipner-class destroyer HNoMS Tor captured in April 1940, re-designated as torpedo boat.
- Tiger (S23): Jaguar-class (Type 140) fast attack craft, commissioned 1958 to 1974
- Tiger (S41): Tiger-class (Type 148) fast attack craft, decommissioned
- Timmendorf: supply ship
- Tirpitz: 42,000 ton Bismarck-class battleship, launched 1939
- Todendorf: Sicherungsboot; Todendorf-class; Wehrbereichskommando Küste
- Togo, Norwegian minesweeper HNoMS Otra captured in April 1940, re-designated as Vorpostenboot, later to minelayer
- Togo: nightfighter control ship
- Torgau: Schwalbe-class minesweeper
- Trave: Isles-class (Type 139 patrol trawler)
- Trave: Schul- und Begleitschiff, später Messboot; Eider-class
- Trischen: harbour tug; Lütje-Hörn-class
- Tsingtao: river gunboat, launched 1903
- Triton: survey vessel
- Triton: submarine chaser; Thetis-class
- Tsingtau: E-boat tender
- Tummler: cutter, training vessel
- Tübingen (M1074): Lindau-class (Type 320) minesweeper, commissioned 1958 to 1975, upgraded to Type 331
- Tübingen: Fulda-class (Type 331, upgraded Type 320 Lindau-class) minesweepers, commissioned 1978 to 1997
- Tümmler: Barbe-class (Type 520) utility landing craft, used as transport ships (decommissioned)

== U ==
- Uckermark (H91): Ohre-class
- Überherrn: Kulmbach-class (Type 332) minehunter
- Ueckermünde (GS01): Kondor-class minesweeper
- Ulan: torpedo testing ship, tender
- Ulm: Lindau-class (Type 320) minesweeper, commissioned (1959 to 1978, upgraded to Type 351, recommissioned 1989 to 1999
- Undine (1869): brigg, launched 1869
- Undine: 2,700 ton Gazelle-class light cruiser, launched 1902
- Undine: minesweeper; Frauenlob-class
- Uranus: minesweeper; Schütze-class
- Usedom: Baskunchak-class tanker

== V ==
- Vaterland: river gunboat, launched 1903
- Vegesack: Vegesack-class (Type 321) minesweeper, commissioned 1959 to 1963
- Versailles: mine-warfare ships
- Victoria Louise: 5,700 ton Victoria Louise-class protected cruiser, launched 1897
- Victoria: corvette; Augusta-class
- Vilm: Project RL 235 tanker
- Vineta (1863): frigate, launched 1863
- Vineta: 5,700 ton Victoria Louise-class protected cruiser, launched 1897
- Vineta: minesweeper; Ariadne-class
- Viper: armoured gunboat, launched 1876
- Viper: landing craft; Eidechse-class
- Vitte (G421): Kondor-class minesweeper
- Vogelsand: harbour tug; Lütje-Hörn-class
- Vogelsand: harbour tug; Nordstrand-class
- Vogtland (H71): Ohre-class
- Völkingen (M1087): Lindau-class (Type 320) minesweeper, commissioned 1960 to 1976, upgraded to Type 331
- Völkingen: Fulda-class (Type 331, upgraded Type 320 Lindau-class) minesweepers, commissioned 1979 to 1999
- Volker: minesweeper, Vorpostenboot; fish trawler
- Von der Groeben: R-boat tender; minesweeper 1916
- Von der Lippe: R-boat tender; minesweeper 1916
- Von der Tann (gunboat): steam-powered gunboat, 1848 to 1862
- Von der Tann (battlescruiser): 19,400 ton unique battlecruiser, launched 1909
- Vulkan: submarine salvage vessel
- Vorwärts: river gunboat, launched 1899
- Vorwärts: torpedo boat; Schütze-class

== W ==
- Wolf: gunboat
- Wolf: gunboat
- Wolf: auxiliary cruiser
- Wolf: auxiliary cruiser
- Wolf: torpedo boat; Raubtier-class
- Wolf: Buoy tender
- Wolja: russische Imperatriza Marija-class
- Wotan: Werkstattschiff; Odin-class, Bundesamt für Wehrtechnik und Beschaffung
- Wotan: minesweeper, Vorpostenboot; fish trawler
- Waage: minesweeper; Schütze-class
- Wacht: aviso, launched 1887
- Wacht: tender; Minesweeper 1916
- Walchensee: Walchensee-class (Type 703) small coastal tanker, decommissioned
- Waldemar Kophamel: submarine tender; Wilhelm-Bauer-class
- Walfisch, ex-Borwin: tug
- Walter Husemann (856): Shershen-class torpedo boat
- Walter Krämer (712): Osa-class missile boat
- Walther von Ledebur: experimental craft
- Wangerooge: Wangerooge-class (Type 722) tug
- Waren: Schwalbe-class minesweeper
- Waren (224): Parchim-class corvette
- Wega: minesweeper; R-boat
- Wega: minesweeper; Schütze-class
- Weichsel: submarine tender
- Weiden: Frankenthal-class (Type 332) minehunter, commissioned 1993 to 2006
- Weihe: SO-I-class submarine chaser
- Weihe (S15): Jaguar-class (Type 140) fast attack craft, commissioned 1959 to 1972
- Weihe (S57): Tiger-class (Type 148) fast attack craft, decommissioned
- Weilheim (M1077): Lindau-class (Type 320) minesweeper, commissioned 1959 to 1976, upgraded to Type 331 and recommissioned 1978 to 1995
- Weilheim (M1059): Frankenthal-class (Type 332) minehunter
- Weimar: Schwalbe-class minesweeper
- Weissenburg: 10,500 ton Brandenburg-class battleship, launched 1891
- Weisswasser: Schwalbe-class minesweeper
- Welle: experimental craft
- Wels: Barbe-class (Type 520) utility landing craft, used as transport ships (decommissioned)
- Werdau: Hai-class submarine chaser
- Werra (tender): Rhein-class (Type 401) tender
- Werra (A514): Elbe-class (Type 404) replenishment ship
- Weser: Rhein-class (Type 401) tender
- Weser: fishery protection vessel, minesweeper tender
- Wespe (1860): gunboat, launched 1860
- Wespe (1876): gunboat, launched 1876
- Wespe: training vessel; Wespe-class
- Westensee: Walchensee-class (Type 703) small coastal tanker, decommissioned
- Westerwald: Westerwald-class (Type 760) ammunition transport ship
- Westfalen: 19,000 ton Nassau-class battleship, launched 1908
- Westfalen: seaplane tender
- Wettin: 12,000 ton Wittelsbach-class battleship, launched 1900
- Wetzlar (M1075): Lindau-class (Type 320) minesweeper, commissioned 1958 to 1976, upgraded to Type 331
- Wetzlar: Fulda-class (Type 331, upgraded Type 320 Lindau-class) minesweepers, commissioned 1978 to 1995
- Widder: 16,000 ton unique auxiliary merchant cruiser
- Widder: minesweeper; Schütze-class
- Wiesbaden: Wiesbaden-class light cruiser, launched 1915
- Wiesbaden (1917): Cöln-class cruiser, launched 1917, not completed
- Wiesel (S32): Zobel-class (Type 142) fast attack craft, commissioned 1962—1984
- Wiesel (S79): Gepard-class (Type 143A) fast attack craft
- Wildschwan: Schnellboot fast attack craft, commissioned 1957—1964
- Wilhelm Bauer: Type 241 submarine, former Kriegsmarine U-2540
- Wilhelm Bauer: submarine tender Wilhelm-Bauer-class
- Wilhelm Florin (815): Shershen-class torpedo boat
- Wilhelm Heidkamp (Z21): Type 1936 destroyer
- Wilhelm Leuschner (824): P-6-class torpedo boat
- Wilhelm Pieck (S61): Wodnik-class training ship
- Wilhem-Pieck-Stadt Guben (323): Kondor-class minesweeper
- Willi Bänsch (844): P-6-class torpedo boat
- Willi Bänsch (831): Shershen-class torpedo boat
- Wische: Ohre-class
- Wismar: Project 4
- Wismar (214: Hai-class submarine chaser
- Wismar (241): Parchim-class corvette
- Wittelsbach: 12,000 ton Wittelsbach-class battleship, launched 1900
- Wittensee: tanker; Klasse 763
- Wittow (E661): Darss-class supply ship
- Wittstock (315): Kondor-class minesweeper
- Wolf (1860): gunboat, launched 1860
- Wolf (1878): gunboat, launched 1878
- Wolf (S3): Jaguar-class (Type 140) fast attack craft, commissioned 1958—1975
- Wolf (S49): Tiger-class (Type 148) fast attack craft, decommissioned
- Wolfgang Thiess (866): P-6-class torpedo boat
- Wolfgang Zenker (Z9): Type 1934A destroyer
- Wolfsburg: Lindau-class (Type 320) minesweeper, commissioned 1958 to 1979, upgraded to Type 351, recommissioned 1989 to 2000
- Wolgast: Habicht-class minesweeper
- Wolgast (V811): Kondor-class minesweeper
- Worms: Vegesack-class (Type 321) minesweeper, commissioned 1960 to 1963
- Wörth: 10,500 ton Brandenburg-class battleship, launched 1892
- Württemberg (1878): 7,800 ton Sachsen-class frigate, launched 1878
- Württemberg (1917): 29,000 ton Bayern-class battleship, not completed
- Wurzen: Schwalbe-class minesweeper

== Y ==
- Yorck: 10,000 ton Roon-class armored cruiser, launched 1904

== Z ==
- Zähringen: 12,000 ton Wittelsbach-class battleship, launched 1901
- Zander (A45): Zander-class salvage tug
- Zander: Barbe-class (Type 520) utility landing craft, used as transport ships (decommissioned)
- Zeitz: Schwalbe-class minesweeper
- Zeitz (314): Kondor-class minesweeper
- Zephir: torpedo boat, Tug
- Zerbst (335): Kondor-class minesweeper
- Zick, Norwegian Trygg-class torpedo boat HNoMS Trygg captured in 1940, re-designated as Vorpostenboot.
- Zieten: aviso, launched 1876
- Zieten: tender, fishery protection vessel, minesweeper
- Zingst (G444): Kondor-class minesweeper
- Zobel (S31): Zobel-class (Type 142) fast attack craft, commissioned 1961—1982
- Zobel (S75): Gepard-class (Type 143A) fast attack craft
- Zwickau: Schwalbe-class minesweeper

== Unnamed ==
- EF3: Schnellboot fast attack craft (former Kriegsmarine S116), commissioned 1957 to 1964
- G37: 1051 ton Großes Torpedoboot 1913-class, launched 1914
- G38: 1051 ton Großes Torpedoboot 1913 class, launched 1914
- G39: 1051 ton Großes Torpedoboot 1913 class, launched 1915
- G40: 1051 ton Großes Torpedoboot 1913 class, launched 1915
- G41: 1051 ton Großes Torpedoboot 1913 class, launched 1915
- G42: 1051 ton Großes Torpedoboot 1913 class, launched 1915
- G85: 1051 ton Großes Torpedoboot 1913 class, launched 1915
- UW10: Schnellboot fast attack craft (former Kriegsmarine S130), commissioned 1957 to 1993
- UW11: Schnellboot fast attack craft (former Kriegsmarine S208), commissioned 1957 to 1964
- V-80: 76-ton experimental submarine
- V108:
- Z-1: Fletcher-class destroyer, former United States Navy USS Anthony, commissioned 1959 to 1972
- Z-2: Fletcher-class destroyer, former United States Navy USS Ringgold, commissioned 1959 to 1981
- Z-3: Fletcher-class destroyer, former United States Navy USS Wadsworth, commissioned 1959 to 1980
- Z-4: Fletcher-class destroyer, former United States Navy USS Claxton, commissioned 1959 to 1981
- Z-5: Fletcher-class destroyer, former United States Navy USS Dyson, commissioned 1960 to 1982
- Z-6: Fletcher-class destroyer, former United States Navy USS Charles Ausburne, commissioned 1960 to 1967
- Z23 through Z30: Type 1936A destroyers
- Z31 through Z34: Type 1936A (Mob) destroyers
- Z35 through Z36: Type 1936B destroyers
- Z37 through Z39: Type 1936A (Mob) destroyers
- Z43 through Z45: Type 1936B destroyers
- Z51: German Type 1942 destroyer launched 1944

== See also ==
- List of German Navy ship classes
- List of ships of the Second World War
