= Norderney (disambiguation) =

Norderney is one of seven populated East Frisian Islands on Germany's North Sea coast.

Norderney may also refer to:

- Lager Norderney, a Nazi prison camp on Alderney, an island in the English Channel
- MV Norderney, a radio ship used by Radio Veronica
- Norderney, a decommissioned Wangerooge-class tug of the German Navy
