= Type 202 submarine =

Class overview
- Builders: Atlas Werke, Bremen
- Operators: German Navy
- Built: 1961–1966
- In commission: 1965–1966
- Planned: 40
- Completed: 2
- Canceled: 38
- Retired: 2

General characteristics
- Type: Midget U-boat
- Displacement: 100 tonnes (98 long tons), surfaced; 137 tonnes (135 long tons), submerged
- Length: 23.10 metres (75 ft 9 in)
- Beam: 3.40 metres (11 ft 2 in)
- Draft: 2.7 metres (8 ft 10 in)
- Propulsion: 243 kilowatts (326 hp) diesel-engine; 257 kilowatts (345 hp) motor-generator; 20 kilowatts (27 hp) silent-running electric motor
- Speed: 6 knots (11 km/h; 6.9 mph), surfaced; 13 knots (24 km/h; 15 mph), submerged
- Range: 400 nautical miles (740 km; 460 mi) at 4 knots (7.4 km/h; 4.6 mph), surfaced; 160 nautical miles (300 km; 180 mi) at 3 knots (5.6 km/h; 3.5 mph), submerged
- Test depth: 100 metres (330 ft)
- Complement: 6
- Armament: 2 × 533 mm (21 in) torpedo tubes, 2 torpedoes or 4 naval mines

The Type 202 submarine was a short lived class of German submarines. Design of these very small submarines started in 1957 by Ingenieurkontor Lübeck (IKL). It was intended to build 40 Type 202 mini submarines with a six-man crew but technical difficulties and doubts about their usefulness reduced them to three, and of those three for trials, to be further reduced to two. The boats were in service only a few months and were scrapped shortly after.

They were one of the few military U-boats not bearing "U-numbers", probably since they were never intended for combat use. Instead they were named after important German engineers in submarine constructions (like Wilhelm Bauer).

Hans Techel was built with traditional propeller and rudders (similar to the Type 205 submarines), but Friedrich Schürer had a rotatable Kort nozzle instead.

== List of ships ==
Pennant number	Name	Laid down	Launched	Com- missioned	Decom- missioned	Fate
S172	Hans Techel	10 October 1961	15 March 1965	14 October 1965	15 December 1966	scrapped
S173	Friedrich Schürer	10 October 1961	10 November 1966	6 April 1966	15 December 1966	scrapped
