= Kulmbach-class mine hunter =

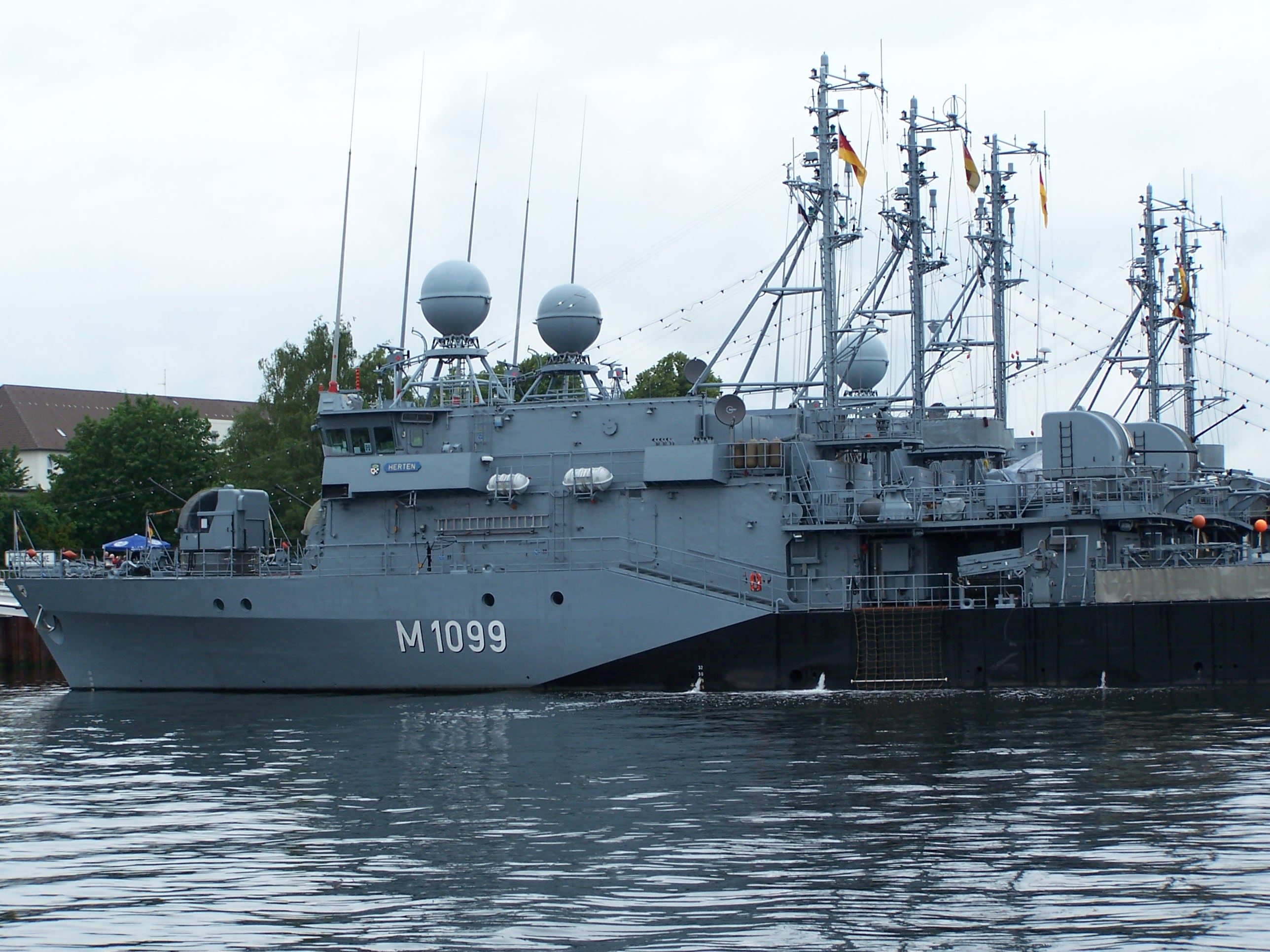
- Kulmbach-class mine hunters stationed at Kiel Naval Base

Class overview
- Operators: German Navy
- Preceded by: Hameln class minesweeper
- Built: 1999–2001
- In commission: 1989-2016
- Completed: 5
- Retired: 5

General characteristics
- Displacement: 635 tonnes
- Length: 54.4 m (178 ft 6 in)
- Beam: 9.2 m (30 ft 2 in)
- Draught: 2.84 m (9 ft 4 in)
- Propulsion: Two propeller shafts driving controllable pitch propellers; two Renk PLS 25 gearboxes; 2 × MTU 16V 538 TB91 diesel engines; 2240 kW each
- Speed: 18 knots
- Complement: 37
- Sensors & processing systems: Navigation radar; Hull-mounted DSQS-11 mine-detection sonar; GPS-Navstar navigation system; PALIS; Digital data links; M 20/2 fire-control system
- Electronic warfare & decoys: 2 × TKWA/MASS (Multi Ammunition Softkill System) decoy launcher (currently under procurement)
- Armament: 2 × Bofors 40mm/L70 dual-purpose gun (currently upgrading to MLG 27 remote-controlled autocannons); 2 × FIM-92 Stinger surface-to-air missile (MANPADS) stands; Mine-laying capabilities

The Type 333 Kulmbach class is a class of five German Navy ships. Built as Type 343 Hameln class minesweepers, they have been upgraded to minehunters using Seefuchs expendable drones to detonate detected naval mines.

== List of ships ==
Pennant number	Name	Call sign	commissioned	decommissioned
M1091	Kulmbach	DRFU	May 23, 1990	March 31, 2012
M1095	Überherrn	DRFS	September 19, 1989	June 30, 2016
M1096	Passau	DRFJ	December 18, 1990	September 27, 2013
M1097	Laboe	DRFK	December 7, 1989	March 28, 2012
M1099	Herten	DRFP	March 26, 1991	June 30, 2016

Notes: The listed commission dates are from their original commission as Type 343 boats since they were not formally recommissioned after their upgrade to Type 333 mine hunters.

The ships currently belong to the 3. Minensuchgeschwader (3rd Minesweeping Squadron) based in Kiel at the Baltic Sea.
