= SMS Schwalbe =

At least three ships of the Prussian Navy (and later Imperial German Navy) or Austro-Hungarian Navy had been named SMS Schwalbe:

- SMS Schwalbe (1860), a Prussian Jäger-class gunboat built in the 1860s
- SMS Schwalbe (1887), a German Schwalbe-class unprotected cruiser built in the 1880s
- SMS Schwalbe (1907), an Austro-Hungarian Kaiman-class torpedo boat built in the 1880s
