= Westerwald-class transport ship =

Class of German Navy replenishment ships

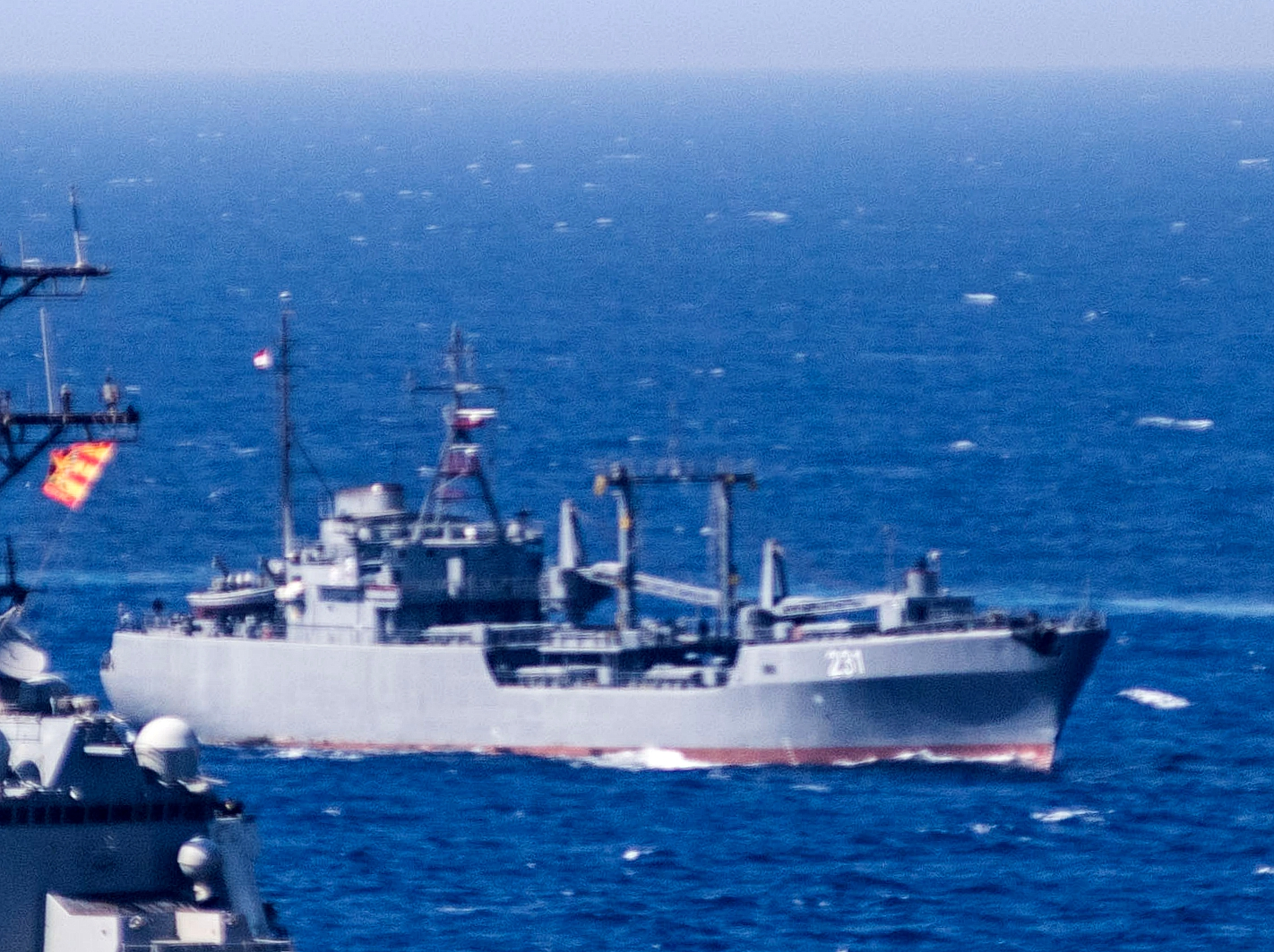
- ENS Halayib in 2018

Class overview
- Name: Westerwald class
- Builders: Orenstein & Koppel
- Operators: German Navy; Egyptian Navy
- Built: 1965–1966
- In commission: 1967–present
- Planned: 2
- Completed: 2
- Active: 1
- Retired: 1

General characteristics
- Type: Replenishment ship
- Displacement: 3,469 tonnes (3,414 long tons)
- Length: 98.8 m (324 ft 2 in)
- Beam: 14.02 m (46 ft 0 in)
- Draft: 3.56 m (11 ft 8 in)
- Propulsion: 2 × Maybach diesel engines, 2 × shafts, 2,060 kW (2,760 hp)
- Speed: 15 knots (28 km/h; 17 mph)
- Complement: 31-60 crew
- Armament: 4 × twin Bofors 40mm / L70 guns

The Type 760 Westerwald-class replenishment ship was a class of two replenishment ships of the German Navy. They were in commission with the German Navy from 1967 to 2010. Their main task was to transport ammunition and material for warships at sea. Odenwald was later sold to the Egyptian Navy and renamed ENS Halayib.

== Development ==
As part of the auxiliary ship program of 1959, drafts for the construction of Type 706 ammunition transporters were drawn up in 1963/64. At the end of 1964, the Orenstein & Koppel shipyard in Lübeck received the order to build two Type 706 ships. In the mid-1980s, the two ammunition transporters received the complete package for maneuvering, consisting of a transverse thrust system, Becker rudder and GUY reduction gear. The supply stations on the Westerwald were subsequently enlarged, and external platforms that could be folded out to the side were installed.

Armaments were only available during the time with a military crew on board.

Odenwald was mainly used for the transport of MM-38 missiles to and from Brest, France. Westerwald was used as a supplier in addition to transporting ammunition. In many cases, the ship was deployed as a supplier in fast attack craft or minesweeping squadrons when the tender subordinate to the squadrons was not available. The two ships were officially reclassified as utilities in the 1990s. Westerwald was redesignated Type 760A and Odenwald, Type 760B.

== Ships of class ==
Pennant number	Name	Callsign	Builders	Launched	Commissioned	Decommissioned	Fate
Westerwald-class crane vessel
A1435	Westerwald	DSHK / DRKT	Orenstein & Koppel	25 February 1966	11 February 1967	17 December 2010	Mothballed at Wilhelmshaven
A1436	Odenwald	DSHL / DRKU	Orenstein & Koppel	5 May 1966	23 March 1967	7 February 2002	Sold to Egypt as ENS Halayib
