= Bottsand-class oil recovery ship =

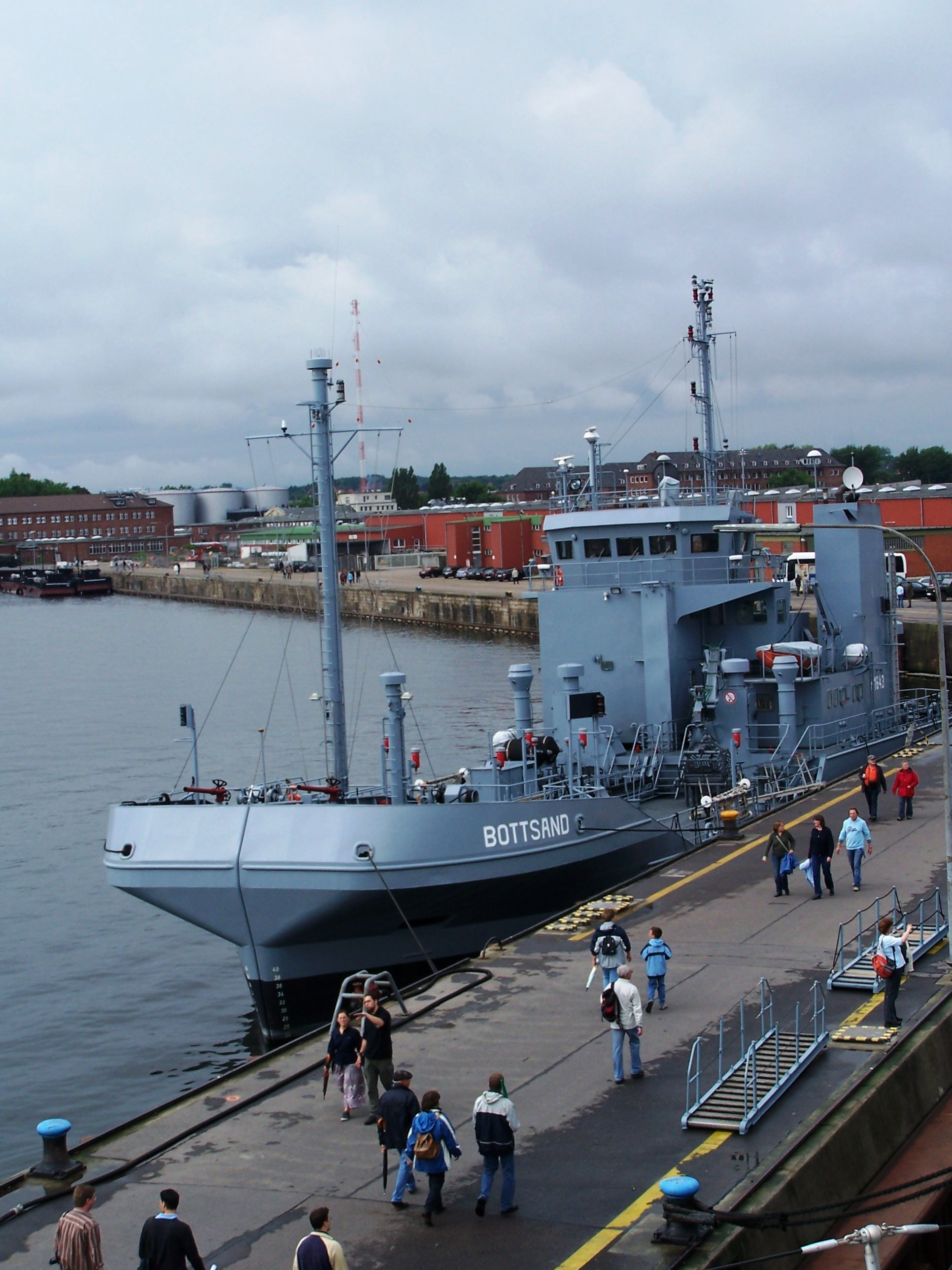
- Bottsand (Type 738) oil recovery ship

Class overview
- Builders: C. Luhring Schiffswerft, Brake and Hegemann, Bremen
- Operators: German Navy
- Completed: 2
- Active: 2

General characteristics
- Type: Oil recovery vessel
- Displacement: 650 tonnes
- Length: 46.3 m (152 ft)
- Beam: 12 m (39 ft)
- Draught: 3.1 m (10 ft)
- Propulsion: 759 kW (1,018 hp)
- Speed: 10 knots (19 km/h; 12 mph)
- Complement: 6 (civilian)

The Bottsand-class oil recovery ships (Type 738) of the German Navy are intended for seawater pollution control. The twin hull ships feature a bow which can be opened by 65 degrees. This creates an area of more than 40 m^{2} (430 sq ft) to collect oil-polluted seawater. The water is pumped into the ship's 790 m^{3} (28,000 cu ft) tank, where it will be cleaned and the oil separated. Per hour one ship can clean up to 140 m^{3} (4,900 cu ft) of ocean surface polluted with a 2 mm (0.079 in) oil slick.

The two ships in the class entered service in 1984 and 1987. The ships are auxiliary ships of the navy. They are used to contain oil spills from German ships in the sea. They are crewed by civilians and not naval personnel.

== List of ships ==
Pennant number	Name	Base	Status
Y1643	Bottsand	Kiel	Active
Y1644	Eversand	Kiel	Active
