= Rhein-class monitor =

Imperial German Navy's Rhein class of ironclad riverine monitors

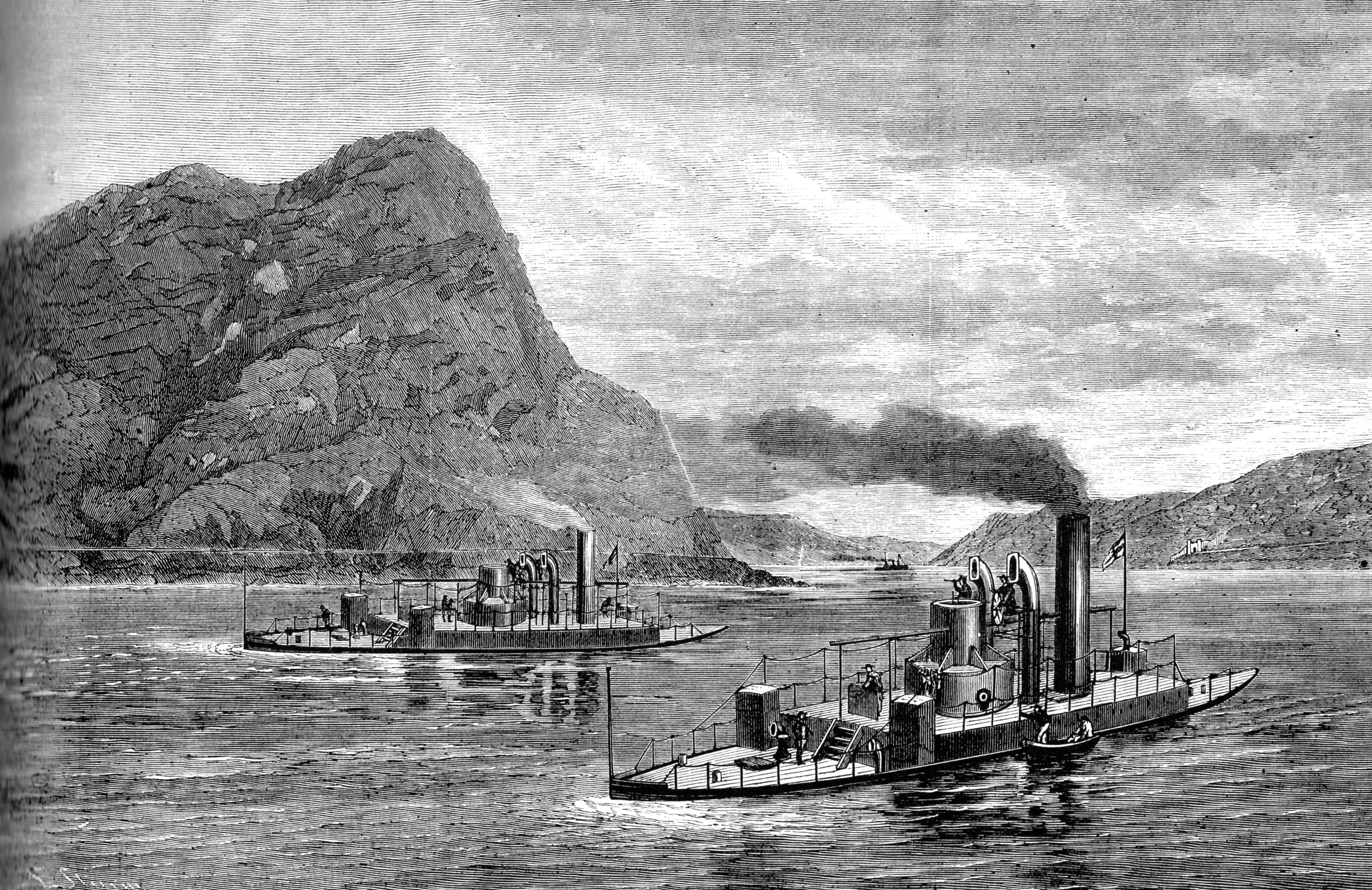
- Sketch of Rhein (left) and Mosel steaming up the Rhine

Class overview
- Builders: AG Weser
- Operators: Imperial German Navy
- Built: 1872–1874
- In service: 1874–1875
- Completed: 2
- Retired: 2

General characteristics
- Type: River monitor
- Displacement: 283 t (279 long tons; 312 short tons)
- Length: 49.6 m (162 ft 9 in)
- Beam: 7.85 m (25 ft 9 in)
- Draft: 1.6 m (5 ft 3 in)
- Installed power: Two locomotive boilers; 48 nph
- Propulsion: 2 × single-cylinder steam engines; 2 × screw propellers
- Speed: 8.25 knots (15.28 km/h; 9.49 mph)
- Complement: 1 officer; 22 men
- Armament: 2 × 12 cm (4.7 in) muzzle-loading bronze cannons
- Armor: Casemate: 65 mm (2.6 in); Turret: 55 mm (2.2 in)

The Rhein class of ironclad riverine monitors (Flußkanonenboote) were a pair of ships built by the German Kaiserliche Marine (Imperial Navy) in the aftermath of the Franco-Prussian War. The class comprised two ships, Rhein and Mosel; both were built by the AG Weser shipyard in Bremen, in 1872–1874. They were armed with a pair of 12 cm (4.7 in) bronze cannon in a revolving gun turret. The ships were intended to protect the German border with France in the event of a conflict, but had short service lives, as war did not come. They served briefly in the defenses of Coblenz, starting in 1875, before being withdrawn from service. The two ships were sold for scrap, apparently in December 1884.

== Design ==
During the Franco-Prussian War of 1870–1871, French naval forces operated small gunboats on the Rhine around Strasbourg to support their forces defending the city. Following the war, the Imperial German Navy decided that it needed to build river gunboats for service on the Rhine and Moselle to defend the German border. This decision came despite the Germans having seen the French Navy's negative experiences with similar gunboats during the war. The German Navy decided that two armored gunboats were necessary, and awarded the contract to AG Weser to design and build the vessels. The design staff based their work on a pair of Austro-Hungarian monitors, Leitha and Maros, that had been recently built for service on the Danube. Indeed, the same armor manufacturer, Eisenwerk Mariazell, supplied armor plate for the new German monitors.

=== Characteristics ===
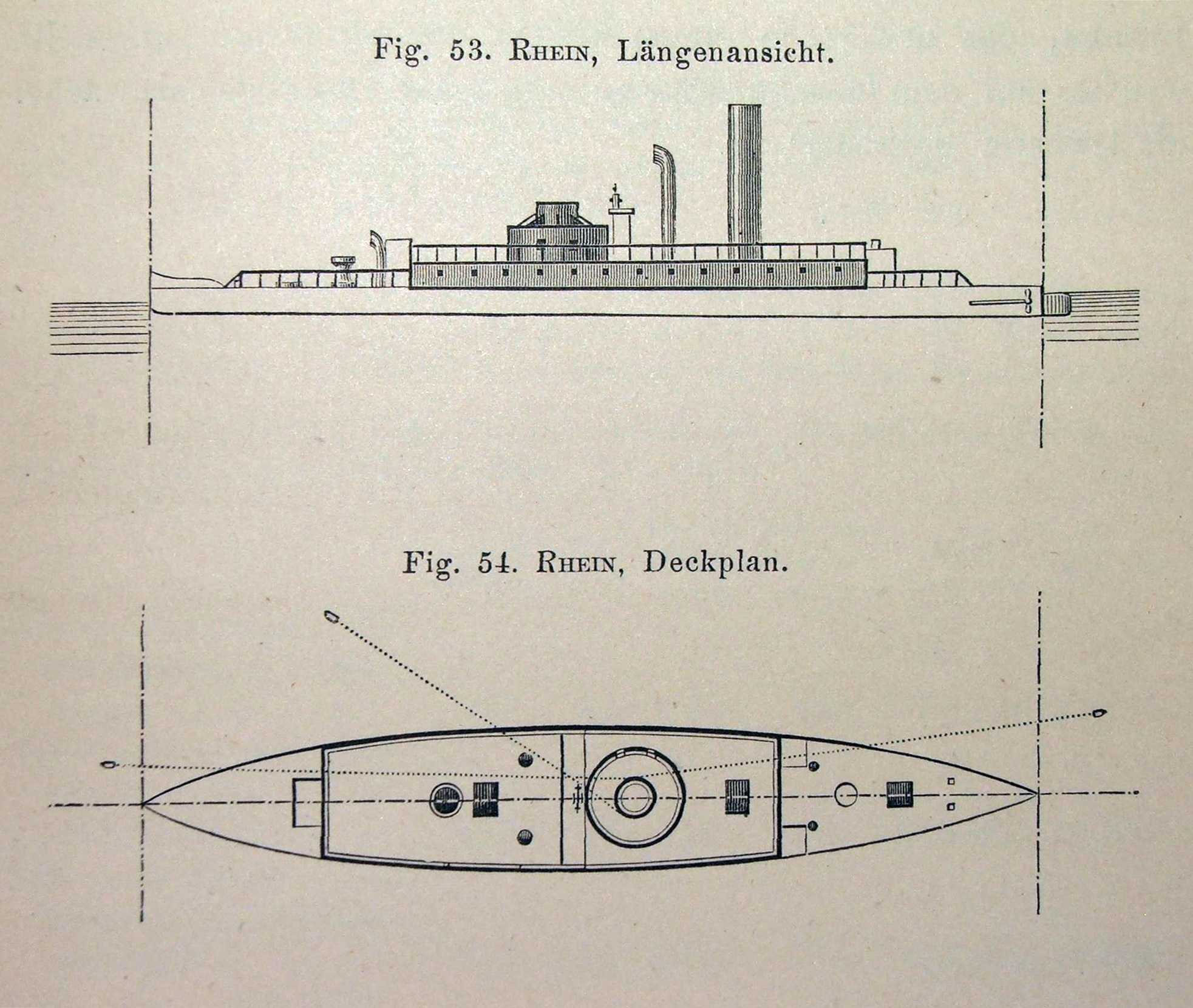
Line-drawing of the Rhein class

Rhein and Mosel were 47.85 meters (157 ft) long at the waterline and 49.60 m (162 ft 9 in) long overall, and had a beam of 7.85 m (25 ft 9 in). At cruising load, the monitors had a forward draft of 0.70 m (2 ft 4 in), an aft draft of 1.07 m (3 ft 6 in), and a maximum draft of 1.60 m (5 ft 3 in). Freeboard was 0.60 m (2 ft) forward and 0.75 m (2 ft 6 in) aft. The ships were designed to partially flood for combat, which would submerge the hull so only the upper casemate and gun turret would be above water. This reduced the freeboard to 0.05 m (2 in) and 0.20 m (7.9 in), respectively. The ships had a designed displacement of 200 metric tons (200 long tons; 220 short tons), and at full load they displaced 283 t (279 long tons; 312 short tons). The hulls were constructed with transverse iron frames.

Command of the ship was normally exercised from a small, open bridge platform placed directly behind the revolving gun turret. When the ships were in combat, the commander and a helmsman would have moved to a smaller, rotating armored cupola that was located atop the gun turret. The ships had a crew of one officer and twenty-two enlisted men, and both carried a single boat. In addition, each vessel had a team of 50–100 men assigned who remained ashore and were to assist with any construction work needed to move or anchor the monitors. Each ship had a cabin for its commander in the casemate, while accommodations for the enlisted men were located in the forecastle. The ships maneuvered slowly and turned poorly, especially steaming downstream. They did not handle well upstream either, particularly in turning against the current. Handling while the ships were flooded for combat was especially dangerous.

The ships were powered by two horizontal 2-cylinder single-expansion marine steam engines; these drove a pair of 3-bladed screw propellers 0.95 m (3 ft 1 in) in diameter. The engines were placed in a single engine room. Two locomotive boilers with two fireboxes apiece supplied steam to the engines; they were located in a separate boiler room and vented through a single funnel. The engines were rated at 320 indicated horsepower (240 kW) and a top speed of 6.5 knots (12.0 km/h; 7.5 mph). In service, they were capable of 48 nominal horsepower and 8.25 knots (15.28 km/h; 9.49 mph). Their engines were insufficiently powerful to overcome the river current when water levels were high, and under those conditions, teams of men with horses would be used to tow the vessels upstream.

The ships were each armed with a pair of 12-centimeter (4.7 in) L/19 bronze cannon manufactured by Krupp; they were rifled, muzzle-loading guns, mounted in a single revolving gun turret placed on an armored casemate amidships. The guns fired a 36-pound shot, and were supplied with 300 rounds of ammunition, which were stored in the casemate on either side of the turret. The turrets were manually operated. The ships were protected with a combination of wrought iron armor and teak. The turret sides were armored with 55 millimeters (2.2 in) of iron, backed with 150 to 200 mm (5.9 to 7.9 in) of teak; the roofs were 65 mm (2.6 in) thick. The armored cupola had 40 mm (1.6 in) thick sides and a 16 mm (0.63 in) thick roof. The casemate was protected with 65 mm of armor plate on the sides. The casemate armor was also backed by 15–20 cm of wood planking.

== Service history ==
The intention for Rhein and Mosel was to use them to defend the railway bridges on the Rhine in the event of a French war of revenge soon after the Franco-Prussian War in the early 1870s. The ships were both built at the AG Weser dockyard in Bremen, under construction numbers 23 and 24, respectively. The Rhine Railway Company was compelled to contribute 300,000 Thalers to the construction of the ships, as they were intended to defend the railway bridges the company used at Rheinhausen. Both ships were laid down in 1872 and launched later that year; they were both commissioned into the Imperial Navy on 25 April 1874. They spent the first year of their career at Rheinhausen, and in April 1875 both vessels embarked on a test cruise to Strassburg. On 7 April, when they were transferred to the defenses of Coblenz. There, they joined a pair of formerly French gunboats in the 7th Festungs-Inspektion (Fortress Inspectorate), part of VIII Armee-Korps (VIII Army Corps). Later that month, both vessels made a test voyage to Strassburg and then they returned north to Mainz.

By the time the two monitors entered service, the prospect of a French attack had decreased, prompting the Navy to question the usefulness of retaining the vessels. As a result, they were quickly removed from service. The ultimate fate of the two ships is unclear; according to naval historian Erich Gröner, both ships were sold for 3,500 gold marks in December 1875. Hugh Lyon, however, states that the ships remained, out of service, until 1884, when they were sold for scrapping. Dirk Nottelmann and David Sullivan concur with Lyon, stating further that the ships were sold in December 1884. The latter version would appear to be correct, as J.F. von Kronenfels published an elevation and deck plan of Rhein in 1881, with the inference that Rhein and Mosel were still extant at that time.
