= Walchensee-class tanker =

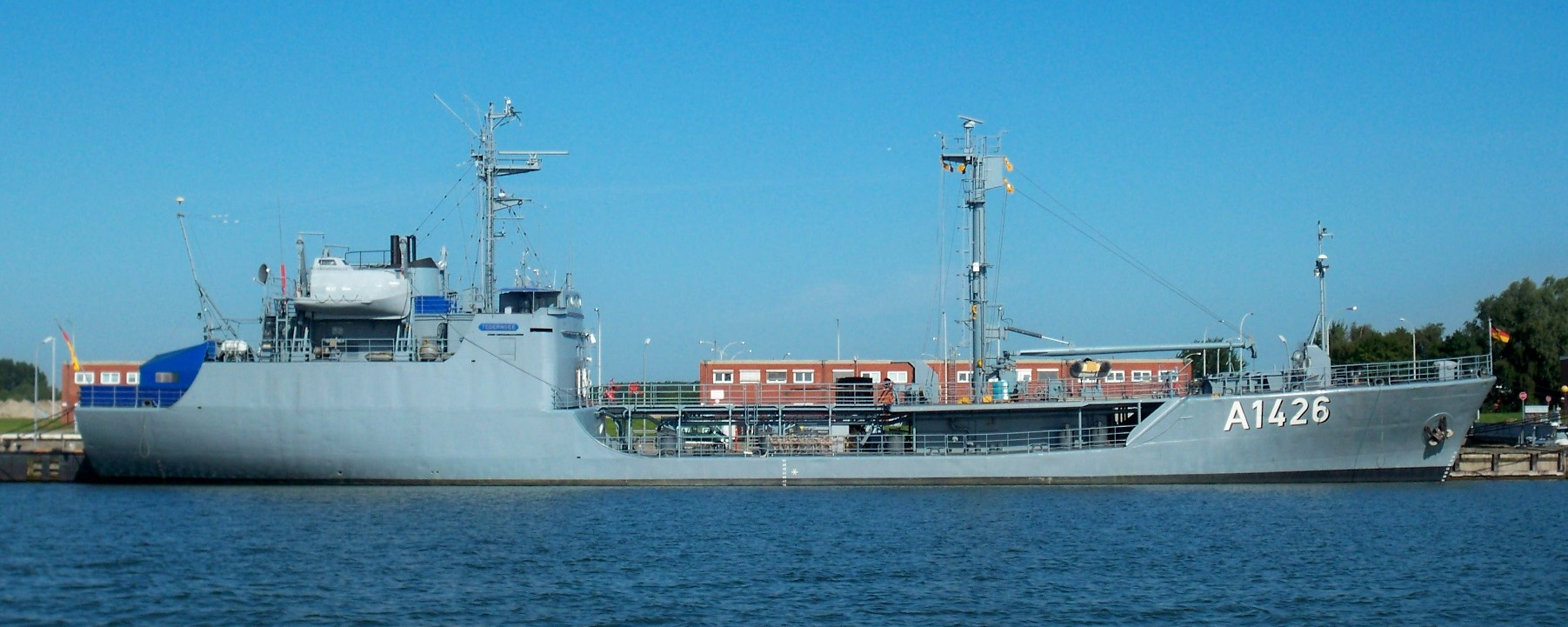
- Tegernsee (2011)

Class overview
- Name: Walchensee class
- Builders: Lindenau-Werft, Kiel
- Operators: German Navy
- Built: 1964-1967
- In service: 1966-2015
- Building: 4
- Active: 0
- Retired: 4

General characteristics
- Class & type: Kleiner Betriebsstofftransporter 703
- Type: Tanker
- Displacement: 2,174 tonnes
- Length: 74.20 m (243 ft 5 in)
- Beam: 11.22 m (36 ft 10 in)
- Draft: 4.54 m (14 ft 11 in)
- Propulsion: 2 × MWM diesel engines, generating 1,020 kW; One controlled-pitch propeller, 2.25 m diameter
- Speed: 12.5 knots (23.2 km/h)
- Range: 3,250 nm at 12 kn
- Complement: 21 civilians
- Sensors & processing systems: Navigation radars only
- Notes: Transport capacity: 1100 t of fuel; 60 t fresh water

The Walchensee-class tanker (Type 703) is a series of four small coastal tankers, built by Lindenau-Werft in Kiel for the German Navy to transport fuel and fresh water between depots and to units near coasts or in harbour.

Two ships were in service until December 2015 and are disposed off, the other 2 were already decommissioned (one sold & one scrapped).

== Ship list ==
Pennant number	Name	Call sign	Launched	Commissioned	Decommissioned	Base/ fate
A 1424	Walchensee		July 10, 1965	June 29, 1966	December 19, 2001	sold
A 1425	Ammersee	DRKJ	July 9, 1966	March 2, 1967	31 December 2015	
A 1426	Tegernsee	DRKK	October 22, 1966	March 23, 1967	31 December 2015	
A 1427	Westensee		April 8, 1967	October 6, 1967	September 30, 2003	scrapped 2009

== See also ==
- T1 tanker US coastal tanker
- T2 tanker
- T3 Tanker
- Victory ships
- Liberty ship
- Type C1 ship
- Type C2 ship
- Type C3 ship
- United States Navy oiler
- Escambia-class replenishment oiler
