= Rhein-class tender =

Class of German Navy tender ships

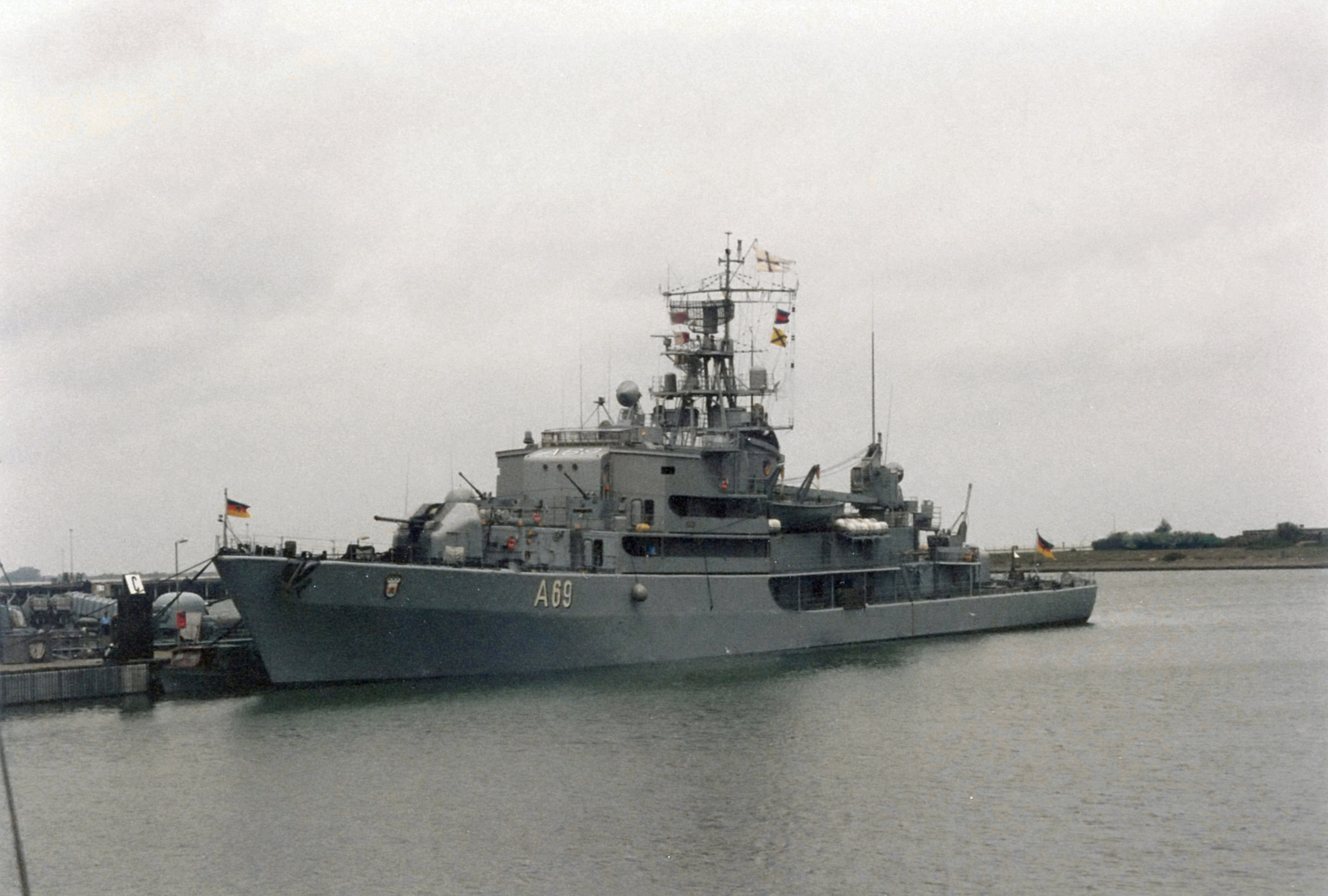
- Donau

Class overview
- Name: Rhein class
- Builders: Schlieker Werft; Elsflether Werft; Lindenau Werft; Lürssen Werft; Blohm+Voss; Flender-Werke
- Operators: German Navy; Turkish Navy
- Subclasses: Mosel class; Lahn class
- Built: 1958-1964
- In commission: 1961-1994
- Planned: 13
- Completed: 13
- Retired: 13

General characteristics
- Type: Tender
- Displacement: 2,370 tonnes (2,330 long tons)
- Length: 99 m (324 ft 10 in)
- Beam: 11.8 m (38 ft 9 in)
- Draft: 3.4 m (11 ft 2 in)
- Propulsion: 6 × Diesel motor, 2 × shafts, 14,400 kW (19,300 hp)
- Speed: 21 knots (39 km/h)
- Complement: 110 crew
- Sensors & processing systems: AN/SPS-6 air-search radar
- Armament: 2 × single 100 mm / L55 gun; 4 × single 40 mm / L70 guns; 2 × depth charge racks

The Type 401 Rhein-class tender was a class of tender ships which was laid down in 1958, christened in 1959 and put into service in 1961 and served as a support unit for the 3rd Schnellboot Squadron until they were decommissioned by 1992. A total of eight ships of this class were built, in addition to the ships Rhine, the Elbe, Main, Neckar, Ruhr, Weser, Werra and Danube.

== Development ==
Tenders are used as supply and command ships and to supply combat units (FACs, anti-mine ships, submarines) with everything they need at sea. Long endurance at sea are only possible with these mother ships. The tenders take care of the supply of fuel, water and provisions, they also provide workshops, spare parts and tools as well as an infirmary with an operating theater for crews.

After decommissioning, four of the ships were scrapped, three sold to Turkey and one to Greece.

The Type 402 Mosel-class tender consists of three ships (Mosel, Isar, Saar) which are used to supply minesweepers.

The Type 403 Lahn-class tender are used to supply submarines with two ships of this subclass, Lahn and Lech.

Depending on the purpose (FAC or minesweeper tender), different drive concepts were used (diesel-electric drive or diesel engines).

== Ships of class ==
Pennant number	Name	Builders	Laid down	Launched	Commissioned	Decommissioned	Fate
Rhine-class tender
A58	Rhein	Schlieker Werft	1958	10 December 1959	6 November 1961	26 June 1992	
A61	Elbe	Schlieker Werft	1 September 1959	5 May 1960	17 April 1962	17 December 1992	Sold to Turkey as TCG Cezayirli Gazi Hasan Paşa (A-579) (ii)
A62	Weser	Elsflether Werft	1 August 1959	11 June 1960	14 July 1962	25 July 1972	Sold to Greece as "Αιγαίον D-03".
A63	Main	Lindenau Werft	1 August 1959	23 July 1960	29 June 1963	25 November 1993	
A64	Ruhr	Schlieker Werft		18 August 1960	2 May 1964	2 December 1971	
A66	Neckar	Lürssen Werft	22 December 1960	26 June 1961	7 December 1963	30 November 1989	Scrapped in Turkey, 1993
A68	Werra	Lindenau Werft	1 October 1959	26 March 1963	2 September 1964	21 March 1991	
A69	Donau	Schlichting Werft	24 December 1959	26 November 1960	23 May 1964	1 December 1994	Sold to Turkey as TCG Cezayirli Gazi Hasan Paşa (A-579) (i), 1994
Mosel-class tender
A67	Mosel	Schlieker Werft; Blohm+Voss		15 December 1960	8 June 1963	28 June 1990	
A54	Isar	Blohm+Voss		14 July 1962	25 January 1964	29 December 1980	Sold to Turkey as TCG Sokullu Mehmet Paşa (A-577)
A65	Saar	Norderwerft	15 December 1959	11 March 1961	11 May 1963	6 May 1992	
Lahn-class tender
A55	Lahn	Flender-Werke	17 April 1961	21 November 1961	24 March 1964	25 April 1991	
A56	Lech	Flender-Werke	20 July 1961	4 May 1962	8 December 1964	30 June 1989	
