= Wangerooge-class tug =

Ship class

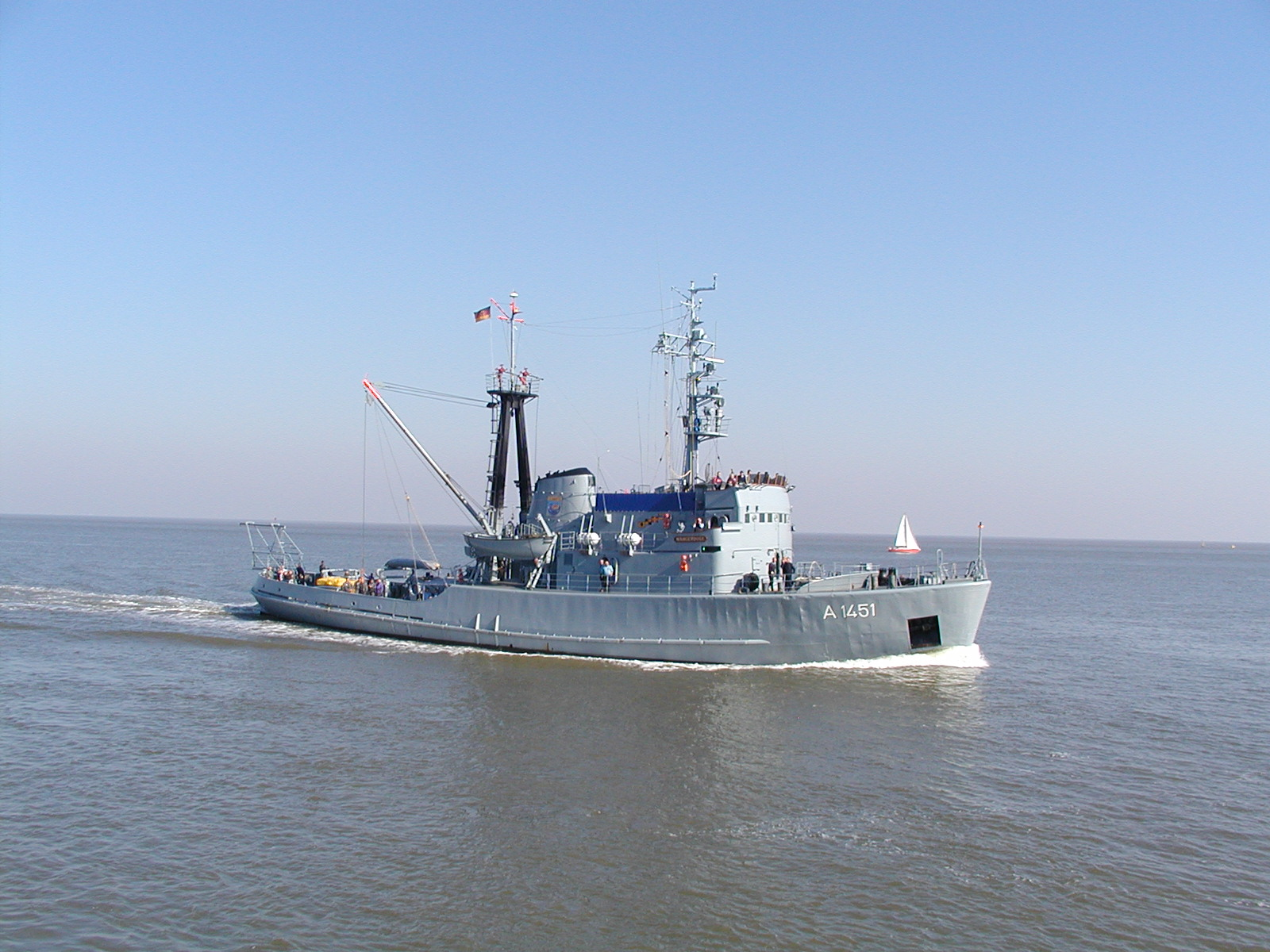
- Wangerooge

Class overview
- Name: Wangerooge
- Operators: German Navy; National Navy of Uruguay
- In service: 1968–2022
- In commission: 1968–1971
- Completed: 5
- Active: 0
- Retired: 2

General characteristics
- Type: Tugboat
- Displacement: 798 tonnes (785 long tons)
- Length: 52.7 m (172 ft 11 in)
- Beam: 12.2 m (40 ft 0 in)
- Propulsion: around 1,500 kW (2,000 hp)
- Speed: 12 knots (22 km/h; 14 mph)
- Complement: 33 civilians

The Type 722 Wangerooge-class tugs are a series of ocean-going tugboats that are used for rescue and salvage operation by the German Navy. They are also used for towing targets and retrieving training torpedoes. Survival training for aircraft crews are also carried out with them.

== Replacements ==
On 12 May 2023, the Federal Office of Bundeswehr Equipment, Information Technology and In-Service Support announced the purchase of Rota Endurance, formerly Highland Endurance, an anchor handling tug (AHT) built in 2003 by Vard Søviknes in Norway as commercial replacement. Further acquisitions of similar commercial tugs boats are being considered with a second tender on-going in 2023.

== List of ships ==
Pennant number	Name	Type/ Upgrade	call sign	Commissioned	Base/fate
A1451	Wangerooge	722C	DRLI	9 April 1968	Wilhelmshaven Out of active service end 2022
A1452	Spiekeroog	722B	DRIJ	14 August 1968	Kiel Out of active service end 2022
A1453	Langeoog	722		14 August 1968	recommissioned as Type 754, A1441 Langeoog
A1454	Baltrum	722		8 October 1968	recommissioned as Type 754, A1439 Baltrum
A1455	Norderney	722B	DRLK	15 October 1970	sold to Uruguay and recommissioned as ROU 23 Maldonado
A1456	Juist	722		1 October 1971	recommissioned as Type 754, A1440 Juist

The ships are named after East Frisian Islands.

== Gallery ==
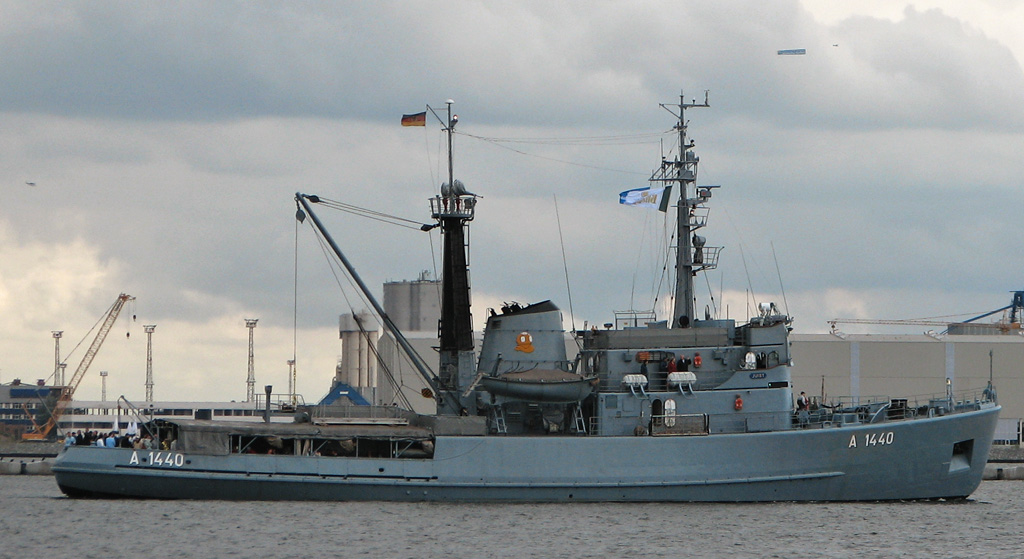
Former Wangerooge-class tug Juist, now a diver training vessel

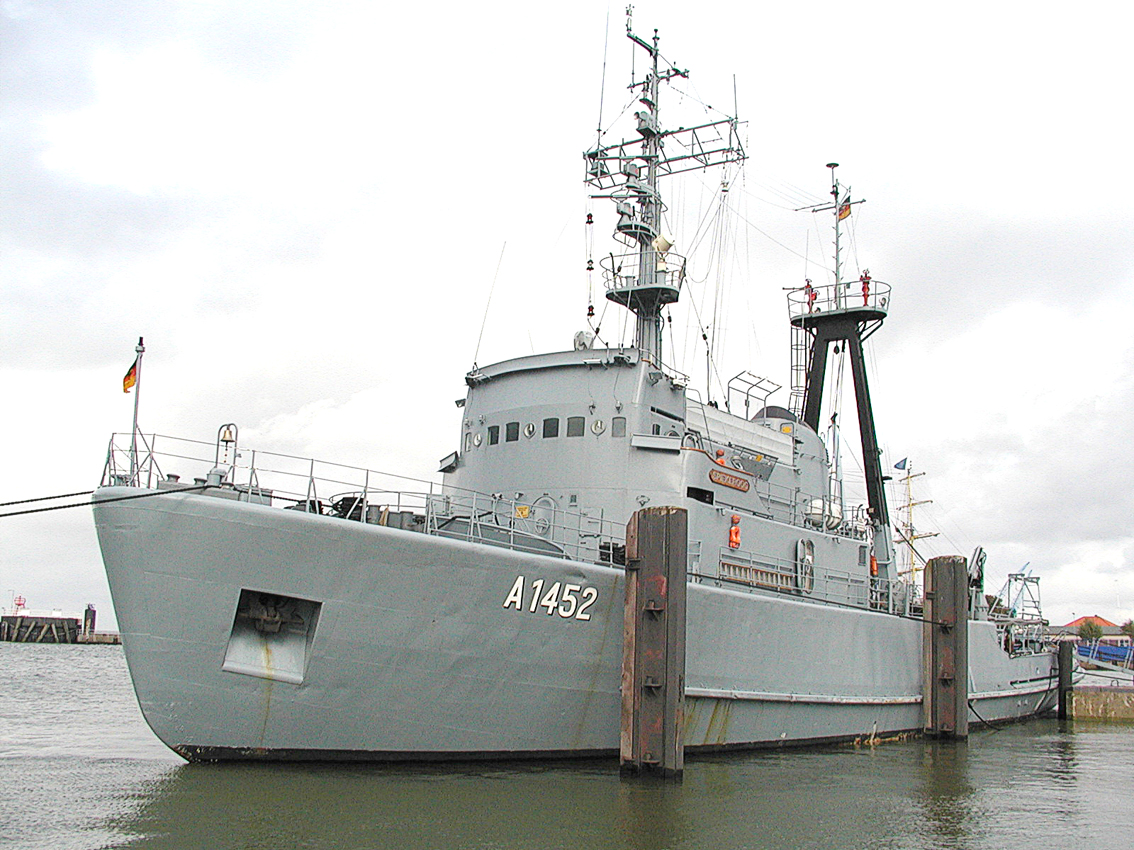
Spiekeroog

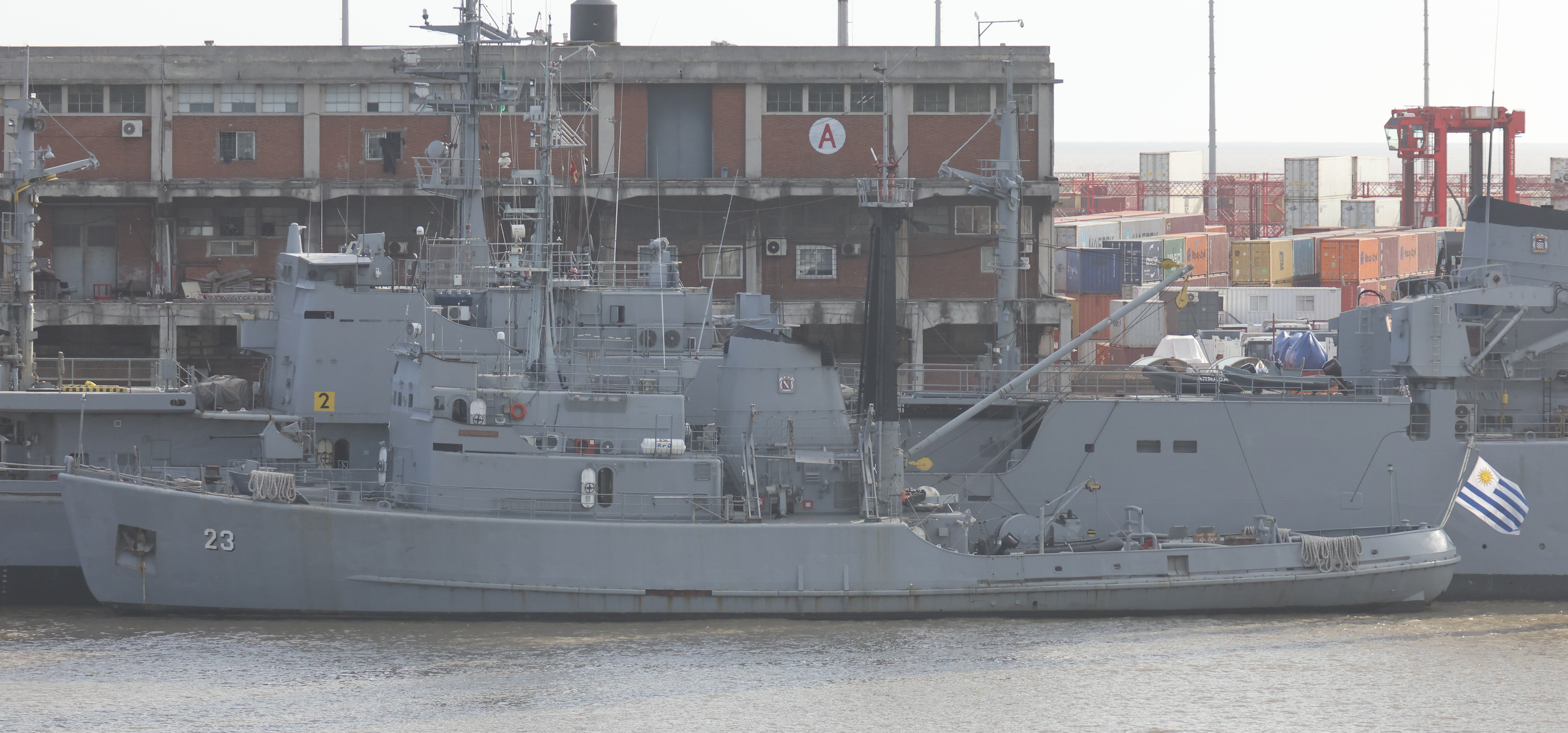
ROU Maldonado, ex-Norderney, moored in Montevideo in 2024

== Sources ==
- Seeschlepper WANGEROOGE-Klasse (in German) - Marine (official homepage of the German Navy)
