= List of German Navy ship classes =

This is a list of naval ship classes that were in service with the Bundesmarine (navy of West Germany), or are still in service with the German Navy (navy of reunited Germany). Some projects, that were not built or future designs are also present.

== The type codes ==
The post-war navy of western Germany introduced a three digit code system to designate every class of vessel they ordered to design or acquired from foreign nations. Even some classes that were only built for export got such codes, most prominently the Type 209 submarine. After reunification the German Navy kept the system, codes for ships from the former forces of East Germany (Volksmarine) were added. (See #Former NVA units).

The code is sometimes prefixed with a letter according to the category of the ships, e.g.:

- U for submarines (U-Boot)
- Z for destroyer (Zerstörer)
- F for frigates (Fregatten)
- S for fast attack craft (Schnellboote)

Upgrades to the design or major refits of already built ships are marked with a postfixed letter, beginning with A for the first modification. This letter is usually spoken and sometimes written according to the NATO Phonetic Alphabet, e.g. class 206 alpha for the upgraded Type 206 submarine.

The codes are grouped with a two-level categorization, the first digit defines the first category. Categories are usually further subdivided in blocks.

In each block of type codes, the numbers were assigned chronologically for designed types. Classes acquired from foreign nation or from World War II were given numbers near the end of their block. Sometimes a block is further divided, e.g. Types 120–139 have apparently been split in frigates (120–129) and corvettes (130–139) with the upcoming Type 130 corvette.

The type codes starting with 0 are not used, and also the digit 0 is skipped at the start of a category, i.e. codes 000–099, 100, 200… are not used.

Individual ships in a class are designated with two digit number following a slash, e.g. 123/02 for the frigate F216 Schleswig-Holstein, second ship of the Type 123 Brandenburg class.

== List of classes ==
=== 100-199 surface combatants ===
101–119 Zerstörer (Destroyer)
Type	Class	Pennant numbers	Number	In service	Notes/Fate
101	Hamburg	D181–184	4	1964–1994	upgraded to 101A, all scrapped
103	Lütjens	D185–187	3	1969–2003	upgrades 103A and 103B, 1 museum ship, the others scrapped
119	Fletcher	D170–180	6	1958–1982	1 used as target ship, 1 scrapped, 4 sold to Greece (later scrapped),

120–139 Fregatten und Korvetten (frigates and corvettes)
Type	Class	Pennant numbers	Number	In service	Notes/Fate
120	Köln	F220–225	6	1961~1989	1 used as hulk, 1 scrapped, 4 sold to Turkey
121	Fregatte 70				cancelled project
122	Bremen	F207–214	8	1982–2022	multi-purpose frigate, retired,
123	Brandenburg	F215–218	4	1994–present	Anti-submarine warfare frigate
124	Sachsen	F219–221	3	2003–present	Anti-aircraft warfare AEGIS frigate
125	Baden-Württemberg	F222–225	4	2016–present	Stabilisation and maritime surveillance frigate
130	Braunschweig	F260–F264	5	2008-present	Corvette, 5 ships active
138	Hunt / Black Swan	F212–218	7	1958~1967	Former British frigates and sloops, used for training, all scrapped
139	Isles	A50–51	2	1956~???	Former British naval trawlers, converted and redesignated Type 752

140–159 Schnellboote (Fast Attack Craft)
Type	Class	Pennant numbers	Number	In service	Notes/Fate
140	Jaguar / Type 55	P6058–6067; P6082–6091	20	1957~1975	6 Eberhard-Arnis, 1 Hirdis-Kiel, 1 used as target ships France, 1 scrapped, 10 sold to Turkey scrapped, 1 museum ship (P6083 Kranich, scrapped 2007)
141	Seeadler	P6068–6077	10	1958~1976	sold to Greece last scrapped 2005/2006
142	Zobel	P6092–6101	10	1961~1984	6 sold to Turkey, 1 Lürssen Shipyard, 3 German Navy (1 for training Ship safety device)
143	Albatros	P6111–6120	10	1976~2005	6 sold to Tunisia, 2 sold privately, 2 can be bought or will be scrapped (2007)
143A	Gepard	P6121–6130	10	1982~2016	10 retired
144	cancelled project with CODAG propulsion				
145	cancelled project of a missile boat				
146	cancelled project of a torpedo boat				
148	Tiger	P6141–6160	20	1972–2002	French origin & powered by Lürssen-Bremen, 6 sold to Chile, 5 to Egypt, 6 to Greece and 3 scrapped
149	Silbermöve	P6052–6057	10	1956–1967	No former World War II of the German Kriegsmarine, new order from the German Bundesgrenzschutz/German Coastguard, unfortunately an offence against the Potsdam Agreement, seizure by the U.K., first in service of the Baltic Fishery Protection Service (Verband Klose), later in the 1. Schnellbootgeschwader of the German Navy
150	50t patrol boat (cancelled project)				
151	50t patrol boat (cancelled project)				
152	Nasty	P6191–6192	2	1960–1973	From Norway, for trials
153	Vosper motor torpedo boat	P6193–6194	2	1962–1967	British origin, for trials
157	???		21	1969–???	small patrol craft, given to Bundesgrenzschutz

160–169 Tragflügelboote (Hydrofoils)
Type	Class	Pennant numbers	Number	In service	Notes/Fate
160	cancelled project, Schlichting design				
161	cancelled project, Lürssen design				
162	NATO project, Bundesmarine withdrew 1977, resulted in the US Pegasus-class hydrofoil, Type 143 built instead				

170–179 U-Jagdboote (Submarine hunters)
Type	Class	Pennant numbers	Number	In service	Notes/Fate
179	La Fouguex(?)		1	1958	French design, Licence built for NATO (?)

=== 200–299 subsurface combatants ===
201–249 U-Boote (Submarines)
Type	Class	Pennant numbers	Number	In service	Notes/Fate
201	Type 201	S180–182	3	1962~1967	350 ton coastal submarines
202	Type 202	S172–173	2	1965~1966	100 ton mini submarines, a large fleet was initially planned, used for trials only
203	cancelled project				
204	cancelled project				
205	Type 205	S183–191	10	1962~2005	450 ton coastal submarines, U11 was upgraded to 205A and U12 to 205B
206	Type 206	S192–199; S171–179	18	1973~2011	500 ton, 12 have been upgraded to 206A, 7 of them still in service
207	Kobben class (Type 207)		16		Type 205 version for Norway and Denmark (lately used only by Poland)
208	Cancelled project or maybe used internally for TR-1700 class				
209	Type 209		over 60		1200-1600 ton boats, for export only
210	Ula class (Type 210)		6		1200 ton boats, Built for Norway
211	cancelled project or maybe used internally for Dolphin class				
212	Type 212	S181–186	6	2005–present	1800 ton, design upgraded to 212A, also built in/for Italy
213	Type 213				planned enhanced 2nd batch of Type 212
214	Type 214				larger export sub, based on Type 209 with some enhancements from Type 212
240	Type 240	S170–S171	2	1957–1968	Upgraded former Kriegsmarine Type XXIII U-boats
241	Wilhelm Bauer	Y880	1	1960–1968	Upgraded former Kriegsmarine Type XXI U-boat

Type numbers 250–299 are not assigned.

=== 300–399 mine warfare vessels ===
301–319 Hochseeminensuchboote (ocean-going minesweeper)
Type	Class	Pennant numbers	Number	In service	Notes/Fate
319	M type	F207–211; M187–192	11	1956–1963	former Kriegsmarine boats, 4 used as target ships (1 sunk), 6 redesignated as 730, others scrapped

320–329 Küstenminensuchboote (coastal minesweepers)
Type	Class	Pennant numbers	Number	In service	Notes/Fate
320	Lindau	M1070–1087	18	1958–1980	12 upgraded to type Type 331, 6 to 351
321	Vegesack	M1250–1255	6	1959–1969	French origin, sold to Turkey

330–339 Minenjagdboote (minehunters)
Type	Class	Pennant numbers	Number	In service	Notes/Fate
331	Fulda	M1071–1072; M1074–1075; M1077–1078; M1080; M1084–1087	12	1972–2000	1 museum ship, 2 scrapped, 2 each to Estonia, Latvia, Lithuania, 1 to Georgia, 1 to Gibraltar
332	Frankenthal	M1058–1069	12	1992–present	
333	Kulmbach	M1091–1096	5		upgraded Type 343 boats
339		W44,45; W53–56	6	1956–1970	former French Navy vessels, Canadian origin, all scrapped

340–369 Schnelle Minensuch- und Minenkampfboote sowie Räumfahrzeuge (fast minesweepers, mine warfare ships and clearing vessels)
Type	Class	Pennant numbers	Number	In service	Notes/Fate
340	Krebs	M1050–1059	10	1959–1990	decommissioned
341	Scorpion	M1060–1069; M1090–1099	20	1959–1990	1 redesignated as Type 903, others decommissioned
342	cancelled project				
343	Hameln	M1090–1099	10	1989–2001	5 upgraded to Type 333, 5 to Type 352
350	project cancelled 1973				
351	Ulm	M1073, M1076; M1079; M1081–1083	6	1989–2000	former Type 320, to South Africa in 2001.; M1081 Konstanz expended as target by two Exocet MM40 surface to surface missiles fired from SA Navy frigates SAS Amatola and SAS Isandlwana during Exercise Red Lion on November 1, 2007 about 90 km west of Saldanha Bay, South Africa.
352	Ensdorf	M1090; M1092–1094; M1098	5		former Type 343 boats; MCM drone controller
355	ERMISS				cancelled project
359	Schütze	M1051–1054; M1056–1064; M1067–1089; W46–48; 52,61,62	24	1956–1968	15 used as Type 730, 1 Type 732, 1 Type 739
360	Hansa	W22	1	1958–1968	redesignated as Type 392
361	Hansa	W21	1	1958–1968	redesignated as Type 391
362		W23–40	18	1961–1968	8 redesignated as Type 393, 10 Type 394
368		W1–3; W13–19	10	1956–1974	4 to Tanzania, 2 to Greece, 1 Type 740
368	Nordwind	Y834	1	1956–present	training boat
369		Y827,830; Y832,833; Y845,846	6	1956–1994	4 to Kazakhstan

370–379 Minenleger (Minelayers)
Type	Class	Pennant numbers	Number	In service	Notes/Fate
370		A1403–1405	3	1961–1971	Former USN LSTs, 1 scrapped, 2 to Turkey

Type numbers 380–389 Netzleger und Netzleichter (net layers and net lighters) were cancelled projects.

390–399 Binnenminensuchboot (inland waterway minesweepers)
Type	Class	Pennant numbers	Number	In service	Notes/Fate
390		M2651	1	1966–present	transformed to Type 740, two boats cancelled
391	Niobe	M2661	1		transformed into Type 740
392	Hansa	M2662	1		transformed into Type 732
393	Ariadne	M2650–2657	8	1961–1992	1 hulk, most scrapped
394	Frauenlob	M2658–2667	10	1966–2001	4 to Estonia, 1 museum ship

=== 400–499 auxiliary ships ===
401–419 Tender
Type	Class	Pennant numbers	Number	In service	Notes/Fate
401	Rhein	A58–66	8	1961–1993	4 scrapped, 3 sold to Turkey, 1 to Greece
402	Mosel	A67,54,65	3	1963–1991	2 scrapped, 1 sold to Turkey
403	Lahn	A55–56	2	1964–1991	scrapped
404	Elbe	A511–516	6	1993–present	
419	Oste	A52,53	2	1956–???	Former Kriegsmarine tender, redesignated and assigned to Type 753 (A52) and 754 (A53)

420–429 Flottendienstboote und U-Jagdboote (Fleet service ships and small submarine hunters)
Type	Class	Pennant numbers	Number	In service	Notes/Fate
420	Thetis	P6052–6056	5	1961–1992	Sold to Greece
421	Hans Bürkner	A1449	1	1963–1990	Fleet service ship, scrapped
422		A50,52,53	3	1957–1988	Former Type 753 ships, Fleet service ships, 1 scrapped, one sold to Turkey, other to Greece
423	Oste	A50,52,53	3	1988–present	Confusingly share same Pennant number and name combinations as Type 422 class

430–439 Torpedofangboote (Torpedo retrieving boats)
Type	Class	Pennant numbers	Number	In service	Notes/Fate
430	Type 430	Y851–856; 872–874	9	1966–present	6 upgraded to 430A, most sold to Greece, 1 maybe still in service
438	Type 438	Y883–886; 835	7	1959–1989	Former Kriegsmarine boats
439	Type 439	Y806–807; P6015–6020; P6043–6051	18	1956–1976	Some of them redesignated as Type 740 or 945, used as patrol boats

401–419 Schulschiffe (School ships)
Type	Class	Pennant numbers	Number	In service	Notes/Fate
440	Deutschland	A59	1	1963–1990	Upgraded to 440A, scrapped
441	Gorch Fock	A60	1	1958–present	Sailing ship
442			2		Sailing ship (planned)

=== 500–599 landing craft ===
501–539 Landungsboote (landing boats)
Type	Class	Pennant numbers	Number	In service	Notes/Fate
502	LSM 1		1		decommissioned
520	Barbe	L760–768; L788–791; L795–799	22	1965–present	Utility landing craft, 5 different upgrades/versions (A–D), 10 to Greece, L762 still in service
521	LCM-8	LCM1–20; A1423; A1430–1434; L786,787	28	1965–present	11 to Greece, decommissioned(?)

540–599 not assigned
Type	Class	Pennant numbers	Number	In service	Notes/Fate
540					Task force support ship (cancelled project?)
550	LSM	L750–753	4	1958–1973	Former USN LSMs
551	LSM	L754,755	2	1958–1967	Former USN LSMs
552	LCA	LCA30–33; LCA35–40	9	1958–1964	Former RN LCAs
553	LCM	LCM10; LCM602–606; LCM231,233; LCM235–237	11	1960–1973	Former USN LCMs
554	LCU	LCU1	1	1959–1967	Former USN LCU, used as LCA leader
555	City of Havanna	WS1	1	1961–1965	Former USN LSD, used as ferry and swimming barrack, sold to Greek Shipping company

=== 600–699 small combatants ===
This category was formally not used. Small NVA combatants were assigned here.

=== 700–799 support vessels, docks, tugs, special vehicles ===
701–736 Transporter, Schlepper und Betriebsfahrzeuge (transport ships, tugs and utility vessels)
Type	Class	Pennant numbers	Number	In service	Notes/Fate
701	Lüneburg	A1411–1418	8	1966–2005	Many upgrades, 701A through 701E
702	Berlin	A1411–1412	3	2001–present	
703	Walchensee	A1424–1427	4	1966–present	small fuel tanker and transport ship, 2 still in service
704	Rhön	A1442–1443	2	1977–present	Larger fuel tanker, originally built for Libya
705		A1403–1406; Y865–866	6	1963–2000	Fresh water tanker, most sold to Turkey and Greece
706	Schwarzwald	A1400	1	1961–1974	Former French Navy ship Almathée, ammunition transport ship
708			2	–1970	Maintenance ships, swimming workshops. Built out of old landing ships
710	Förde	A1641–1642	2	1967–1992	Oil tank cleaning ships, scrapped
711	Hiev		2	1962–present	100t swimming cranes
712			2	1961–present	Lifting docks
713			4	1961–present	lifting pontoons, 1 still in service?
714	Dock B		1	1963–present	4500t self-propelled swimming dock, built 1939
715			3	1960–present	8000t swimming docks, built 1943
718		LP1–LP3	2	1964–present	submarine battery loading prams, 1 still in service?
719	Memmert	Y875	1	1956–1980	former US Navy USN 106 crane ship
720	Helgoland	A1457–1458	2	1966–present	Salvage tug, upgrades 720A, 720B. A1458 Fehmarn still in service
721	Eisvogel	A1401–1402	2	1961–present	icebreaker, A1402 decommissioned
722	Wangerooge	A1451–1456	6	1968–present	ocean tugs, three redesignated as Type 754, A1451 Wangerooge and A1452 Spiekeroog still in service, upgrades 722A,722B,722C
723	Lütje Hörn	Y812–819	8	1958–1990	small harbour tugs, 5 sold to Greece, two scrapped, 1 museum ship
724	Sylt	Y820–823; Y1680–1682	8	1962–present	larger harbour tugs, 2 sold to Greece, one to Latvia, three scrapped, 1 to Bundesgrenzschutz, Y1680 still in service(?)
725	Nordstrand	Y812–819	6	1987–present	harbour tugs
726		Y847–848	2	1960–1991	former landing crafts used as workshop ships
727	Wieland	Y804	1	1956–1971	swimming workshop
728			1		workshop pram, decommissioned
729	Passat	Y800–Y803	4	1956–1978	former Kriegsmarine tugs, some used as target ship, others scrapped
730		Y809–811; WBM I–VI; WBR I–XVII	28	–1986	assorted old ships used as hulks, all scrapped
732			35	1956–present	mine- and torpedo diver rafts, most (all?) scrapped
734			1		firefighting boat, decommissioned
735	hospital ship, cancelled project				
736	hospital ship, cancelled project				
737			21	1961–present	assorted small lighters
738	Bottsand	Y1634–1635	2	1985–present	oil recovery ships
739			3	1969–1981	electric power supply ships

740–759 Erprobungs-, Forschungs- und Spezialschiffe (trials, research and special ships)
Type	Class	Pennant numbers	Number	In service	Notes/Fate
740		(many)	31		Assorted ships and boats used for trials
741		A1408, Y838	2	1967–present	naval mine trials ship
742	Walther von Ledebur; Mülhausen	A1410; M1052	1	1967–1994; 1995–present	mine trials ship, after upgrade to 742A renamed and now mine diver ship
743	AM	Y1674,1675; Y1679	3	1971–present	work boats
744		Y1670,1683; Y1684,1686	4	1965–present	multipurpose utility boats
745	Stollergrund	Y863–867	5	1989–present	small multipurpose utility boats; Kalkgrund (Y865) and Bant (Y867) sold to Israeli Navy
746	Torpedoscheibe		3	1959–present	2 decommissioned
747			4	1959–1983	experimental remote controlled mine sweepers, trials of the TROIKA system
748	Schwedeneck	Y860–862	3	1987–present	middle sized multipurpose utility boats
749	large multipurpose utility boats, project cancelled				
750	Planet	A1450	1	1967–present	defence trials ship
751	Trave	A51	1	???–1977	oceanographic research ship; another boat was planned, but sold to Turkey instead
752		A50,51	2	1956–???	mine-throwing ship, one converted to Type 732, other to Type 751
753		A50,52,53; A1456	4	1956–present	measurement boats, first three converted to 422, A1456 is now a NATO research ship
754		Y1662; A1439–1441	4		1 former Kriegsmarine vessel (decommissioned), 3 former Type 722 tugs; diver training boats
759	Seeschwalbe	W63	1	–1966	Research vessel, redesignated Type 740

760–790 Transporter (transport ships)
Type	Class	Pennant numbers	Number	In service	Notes/Fate
760	Westerwald	A1435–1436	2	1967–present	A1435 still in service, A1436 decommissioned
761	torpedo transport ship, not built				
762	Sachsenwald	A1437–1438	2	1968–1993	Mine transport ships, scrapped
763		A1406–1407; Y824–Y825	4	1956–1995	Fuel tanker, 2 were former Kriegsmarine ships, 1 sold to Turkey, 3 scrapped
764		A1408–1409	2	1955–1992	Transport ships, French origin, both sold to Turkey
766		A1428–1429	2	1963–1977	Fuel tanker, both scrapped in Netherlands
780		A1438–1441	4	1959–1977	Fuel tanker, scrapped in Hamburg
785		Y830–832	3	1960–1969	Depot ships, scrapped
790	Ammunition transport ship, cancelled project				

=== 800–899 ===
This range of Type numbers is not allocated.

=== 900–999 Safety, rescue, liaison & boats for special purposes ===
901–909 Sicherheits- und Seenotrettungsfahrzeuge (safeguard and rescue vessels)
Type	Class	Pennant numbers	Number	In service	Notes/Fate
903	Stier	1	Y849	1966–present	former M1061, Type 341, redesignated Type 732
905	Todendorf	Y835–839	5	1993–present	security boats
906		Y861–863	3	1961–1975	former Royal Air Force aircrew rescue boats, one used as Type 740 target ship from 1975 to 1977, others scrapped
907		W57–60	4	1956–1976	former Luftwaffe and USN boats, used for air crew rescue missions
908		VB1–2	2	1973–1992	fast messenger boats
909		Y857–860	4	1956–1993	air crew rescue boats, one gone to harbour police, Bremen

910–919 Dienstsegelboote (service sailing boats)
Type	Class	Pennant numbers	Number	In service	Notes/Fate
910			26		assorted small yachts, some sunk, most (all?) decommissioned
911	Star		8		At least 2 decommissioned, named after Gemstones
912			11		Pirate class dinghy at least 1 decommissioned, have female given names
913			12		
914			26		another class of Pirat dinghies, have male names, all decommissioned
915			17		another class of Pirat dinghies, have male names,

920–929 Sportboote (yachts) are unassigned.

930–959 Verkehrs- und Beiboote (liaison boats and dinghies)
Type	Class	Pennant numbers	Number	In service	Notes/Fate
930			32		old Kriegsmarine barges, 45–100PS motors, some with cabins, out of service
931			8	1958–1993	barges, 70/90PS motor
932			15	1958–1981	liaison boats, 70/120PS motor
933			23		pinnaces, with cabin, 70PS motor
934			20		barges, with cabin
935			24		pinnaces, wooden, without cabin, 70PS motor
936			15		pinnaces, wooden, cabin, 47–75PS motor
937			2		pinnaces, wooden, 70 or 54PS motor
938			6		motor dinghies
939	Lindau		1		motor dinghy, 5m, wooden/GRP hull, 75PS pump-jet
940			60		cutter, wooden, with 20PS motor
941			92		cutters, wooden, with sail, no motor
942			16		dinghies, wooden, with sail and sword
943			5		dinghies, GRP hull, with sail
944			75		dinghies, wooden, with sail
945		Y16xx	16		assorted harbour barges, diver service boats, motor barges, tug barges
946		Y16xx	5	1985–present	tug barges
947			65		motor cutters, 20PS motor, GRP hull
948			16		pinnaces with cabin, GRP hull, 70PS motor, GRP hull
949			48		cutters, without motor, GRP hull
950			2		dinghies, GRP hull
951			16		utility motorboats, GRP hull
952			12		two types of open lifeboats for tankers 6.5 m (20 persons) or 6.0 m (14 persons) long, steel hull
953	Emsland		1		prototype of closed lifeboat for tankers, GRP hull
954			28		pinnaces without cabin, 70PS motor, GRP hull

960–965 Motorrettungs- und Bereitschaftsboote (motor lifeboats and stand-by boats
Type	Class	Pennant numbers	Number	In service	Notes/Fate
960					partly closed
961					partly closed, self erecting
962					fully closed
963					with air supply
964					fire protected
965					assorted stand-by boats

Type numbers 966–999 are not allocated.

== Former NVA units ==
After the unification of the German Navies, the Eastern German ship classes got Type codes of the Western system. Especially for those that were soon sold afterwards to foreign navies, this process did not strictly follow the previous rules. Sometimes already allocated codes were reused or the previously spared x00 codes were assigned. But the vast majority was categorized in the previously unused 600-699 range, but even here the same Type code is often used more than once. And sometimes, ships of the same class are spread over different Type codes.

Type	Class	Pennant numbers	Number	In service	Notes/fate
140	Parchim I	P6167—6170	4	1984—1991	sold to Indonesia
300	Projekt 89.2	M2670—2671	5	1973—1991	2 sold to Indonesia, 3 to Uruguay
391	Projekt 89.1	BG31—33	3	—1996	1 to each Tunisia, Malta, Cape Verde
420	Parchim	213—214; 222—224; 231—233; 242—244	11	—1991	submarine hunters, sold to Indonesia, see also Type 140
600		K41—43	3	-1991	ELINT ships, 2 to Estonia, 1 to Spain
600	Wilhelm Pieck	S41	1	—1996	scrapped in Spain
600	Project 600?	C112, C661	2	—1991	Tanker, scrapped?
600		A441, A114	2	—1991	salvage vessels, 1 to Uruguayan Navy, 1 scrapped(?)
600	Koni I	142, F225	2	1986—1991	Koni I, scrapped?
610	Rostock	F224	1	1978—1991	another Koni I, sold to United Kingdom
620	Balcom 10	P6165	1	1990—1991	to Bundesgrenzschutz
621	Tarantul I	571—575; P6166	6	1985—1991	2 to USN, 3 scrapped, 1 ??
630	Grevesmühlen	P6164	1	1984—1991	Parchim I, sold to Indonesia
640	Tangerhütte	M2669	1	1972—1991	Project 89.2 minesweeper, ??
650	Project 162	Y890—895	6	1984—2002	Swimming base, habitat
660	assorted tugboats	Y1650—1651; Y1654—1656...	?		??, two still in service
660	assorted salvage vessels		?	??	??
670	Gustav Königs	Y1652, Y1657	2	—1994	Tankers, scrapped(?)
680		Y1653, D44	2	—1991	Sea mark boats(?), scrapped(?)
690	Project 602	A1430—1434; V816	6	1983—1991	Replenishment ships, Scrapped in Belgium(?)
