= List of ship commissionings in 1970 =

The list of ship commissionings in 1970 includes a chronological list of all ships commissioned in 1970.

	Operator	Ship	Flag	Class and type	Pennant	Other notes
20 January	Royal Australian Navy	Swan		River-class destroyer escort	DE 50	
24 January	United States Navy	Manitowoc		Newport-class tank landing ship	LST-1180	
4 February	United States Navy	Finback		Sturgeon-class submarine	SSN-670	
12 February	Royal Navy	Scylla		Leander-class frigate	F71	
21 February	United States Navy	Peoria		Newport-class tank landing ship	LST-1183	
27 February	Royal Danish Navy	Narhvalen		Narhvalen-class submarine	S320	
7 March	Royal Navy	Norfolk		County-class destroyer	D21	
11 April	United States Navy	Frederick		Newport-class tank landing ship	LST-1184	
29 April	United States Navy	Flying Fish		Sturgeon-class submarine	SSN-673	
29 April	Rederi AB Slite	Apollo	Sweden	Ferry		For Viking Line traffic
2 May	German Navy	Rommel		Lütjens-class destroyer	D187	
23 May	United States Navy	Coronado		Austin-class amphibious transport dock	AGF-11	
24 May	United States Navy	Inchon		Iwo Jima-class amphibious assault ship	LPH-12	
13 June	United States Navy	Vreeland		Knox-class frigate	FF-1068	
20 June	United States Navy	Sumter		Newport-class tank landing ship	LST-1181	
6 July	Svea Line (Finland)	Fennia	Finland	Ferry		Transferred from Siljarederiet; continued in Silja Line traffic
9 July	Royal Navy	Achilles		Leander-class frigate	F12	
14 July	Royal Navy	Antrim		County-class destroyer	D18	
18 July	United States Navy	Blakely		Knox-class frigate	FF-1072	
25 July	United States Navy	Francis Hammond		Knox-class frigate	FF-1067	
7 August	Royal Canadian Navy	Preserver		Protecteur-class replenishment oiler	AOR 510	
8 August	United States Navy	Cayuga		Newport-class tank landing ship	LST-1186	
9 August	Rederi Ab Sally	Viking 1	Finland	Ferry		For Viking Line traffic
14 August	United States Navy	Trepang		Sturgeon-class submarine	SSN-674	
22 August	United States Navy	Whipple		Knox-class frigate	FF-1062	
September	SF Line	Marella	Finland	Ferry		For Viking Line traffic
3 October	United States Navy	Portland		Anchorage-class dock landing ship	LSD-37	
23 October	United States Navy	San Jose		Mars-class combat stores ship	AFS-7	
24 October	United States Navy	Tuscaloosa		Newport-class tank landing ship	LST-1187	
14 November	United States Navy	Blue Ridge		Blue Ridge-class command ship	LCC-19	
1 December	United States Navy	Badger		Knox-class frigate	FF-1071	
12 December	United States Navy	Ouellet		Knox-class frigate	FF-1077	
22 December	Royal Danish Navy	Nordkaperen		Narhvalen-class submarine	S320	
28 December	Soviet Navy	Admiral Isakov		Project 1134A Berkut A large anti-submarine ship		
31 December	Soviet Navy	Bditelnyy		Project 1135 large anti-submarine ship	500	
