= Submarines in the Royal Danish Navy =

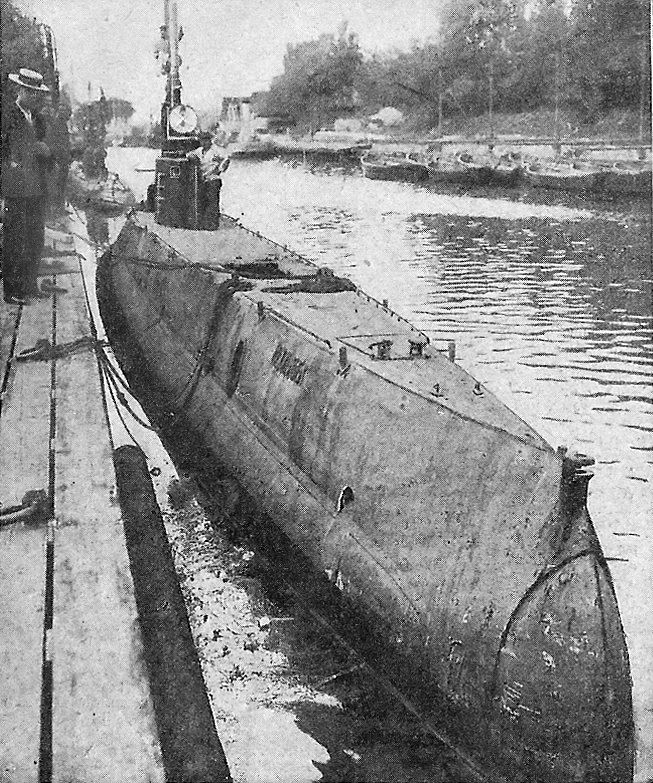
Danish Submarine Havmanden in 1914

Submarines in the Royal Danish Navy were introduced in 1909, with various models in service all the way up to 2004. Danish submarines had been operated through many developments in submarine technology, and in the 21st century was operating three submarines. Conventionally powered submarines were operated, including a unique littoral submarine used in shallower coastal waters. Overall, the Navy relied on the submarines of NATO partners in the region and its other naval assets to achieve a cost saving. After twenty years, with the replacement of Thetis-class patrol frigate and rising defense budgets, discussion are occurring to bring back this weapon systems as part of its overall naval structure. Without submarines, other Naval assets such as ASW helicopters and naval assets fill in the defense picture. Not operating submarines did not mean an end to concerns about ASW defense.

The Danish submarine programme lasted from the year 1909 until the surprising suspension of the programme in the year 2004. Danish submarines programme included several different classes of submarines throughout the programme's lifespan. The Royal Danish Navy also participated in a joint-development by Denmark, Norway and Sweden of the Viking-Class submarine, to be built by the Viking Corporation. However, when the Danish submarine programme was suspended in 2004, the Viking-project was cancelled. Reasons for abandonment of the Danish submarine programme remain unclear, however, in recent years there has been debate on the restart of the submarine programme due to changing geopolitical environments, such as in the Arctic.

The Danish submarine fleet has a storied history, and one of the moments of battle was during WW2, when the fleet was scuttled in 1943 to prevent it falling into the hands of the Nazi regime that had taken over much of Europe at that time.

== History ==
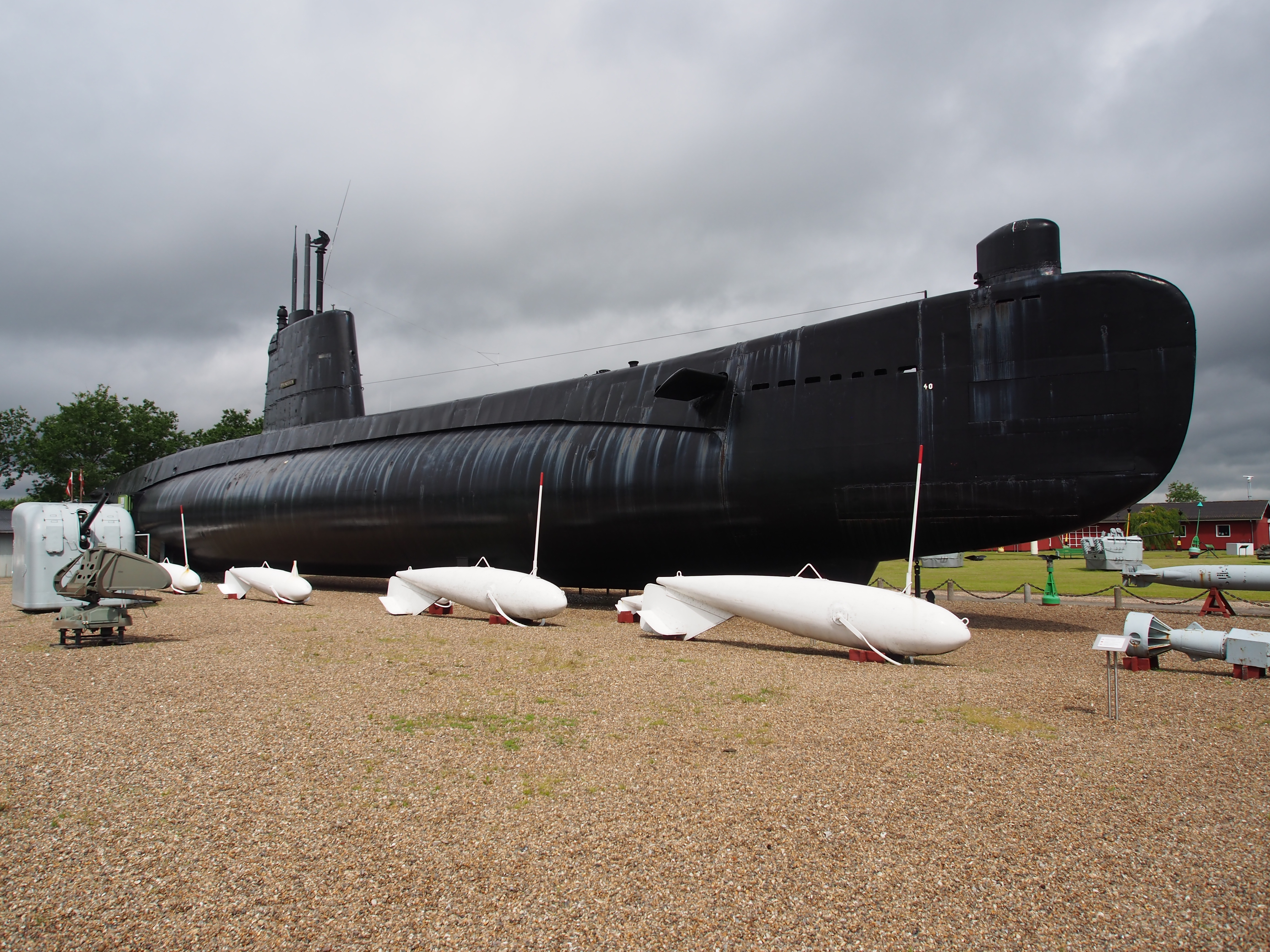
The retired S329 Delfinen-class submarine (Dolphin-class) Springeren

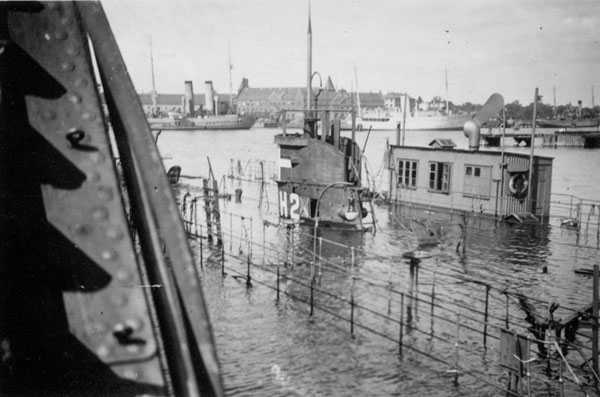
Historical image of the scuttled Havfruen submarine (1943)

Danish submarines for naval use started in the year 1909, with the submarine HDMS Dykkeren. Dykkeren, however, collided with the Norwegian Steamer VESLA on October 9, 1916, and was consequently sunk. What followed was 95 years of different submarine-classes serving in the Royal Danish Navy.

On August 29, 1943, the Royal Danish Navy sank the Danish naval fleet to deny the Nazi-German occupiers the use of the Danish navy. The C, D and H-Class submarines were sunk during the operation. After WWII, the Royal Danish Navy had to be rebuilt with the Delfinen-class submarines. Before the rebuilding of the Danish submarines, The Royal Danish Navy leased the U-Class submarines from the British Royal Navy between the years 1946 and 1954. The last submarine still in commission in the Royal Danish navy was the Kronberg, which were commissioned in 2001 and ended in 2004. When the Danish submarine programme was terminated, the Kronberg was returned to the Swedish Royal Navy on October 27, 2004, and renamed NÄCKEN In addition two Tumleren class were also decommissioned.

A planned Joint-development by the three Nordic countries of Denmark, Sweden and Norway, with Finland as an observer was initiated in July 1997. A total of 10 VIKING-Class submarines was planned for delivery in 2009, in which Denmark and Norway would be acquiring four each, and Sweden would be acquiring only two of the submarines. Norway withdrew from the VIKING-project on June 19, 2002, following this. Sweden and Denmark was determined to continue the project When the Royal Danish Navy announced plans to terminate the use of submarine weapons systems in 2004, however, the VIKING-Class submarine project was scrapped altogether, for all of the Nordic countries and the construction of the 10 planned VIKING-Class submarines was cancelled. Reasons for the Royal Danish Navy to participate in the VIKING-Class submarine project was, that the Royal Danish Navy needed a new generation of coastal submarines. It was emphasized, that the Royal Danish Navy had an expertise in conducting coastal submarine missions, having just completed a mission in the Persian Gulf with the HDMS Sælen.

The two Tumleren class submarines that were in service were decommissioned in November 2004, and the Kronberg was handed to Sweden in October. Starting 1 January 2005, the defense agreement came into effect as approved by the Danish, and cost savings of 4 billion Dkr was achieved (about 700 million USD).

== Uses and missions ==
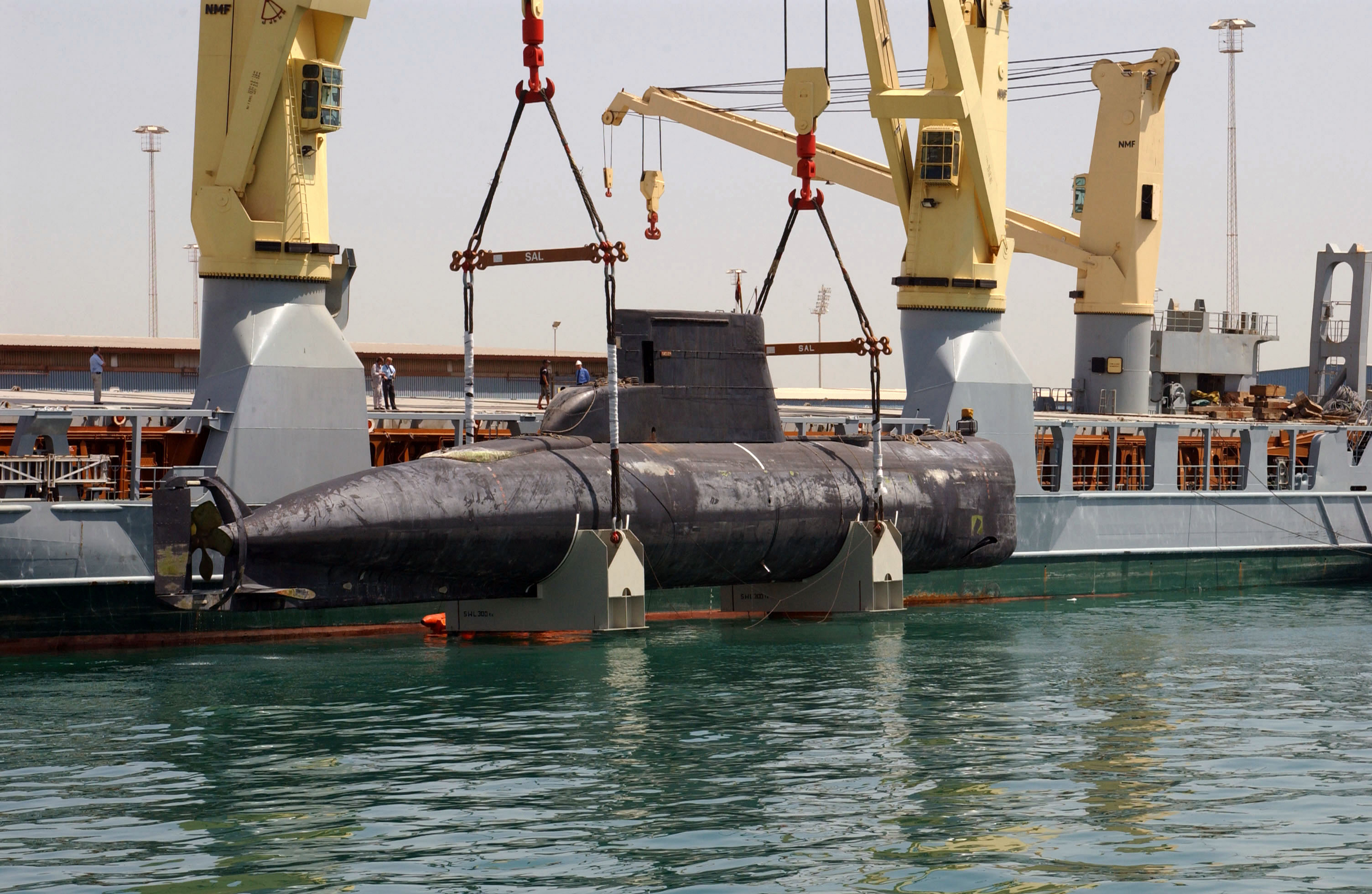
HDMS Sælen (Tumleren-class) is transported aboard a ship in 2003, to bring it back to Denmark in a more cost-effective way after its overseas deployment.

The Royal Danish Navy primarily employed coastal submarines (also called littoral), which excel in operating in coastal waters. These types of submarines can be used for gathering intelligence, as well as deploying special forces troops to conflict areas undetected. Seeing as the Danish military primarily participated in coalition forces missions during the post-cold war period, coastal submarines were an effective submarine weapons system for external missions of Denmark.

HDMS Sælen was dispatched to the Persian Gulf during the 2003 invasion of Iraq, to assist the Coalition forces. Being a coastal submarine, HDMS Sælen contributed the war efforts with gathering intelligence undetected in order to create a clearer aggregated intelligence picture for use by the Coalition forces in the war. HDMS Sælen served in the war for 385 days from May 2002 to June 2003.

== 2004 termination ==
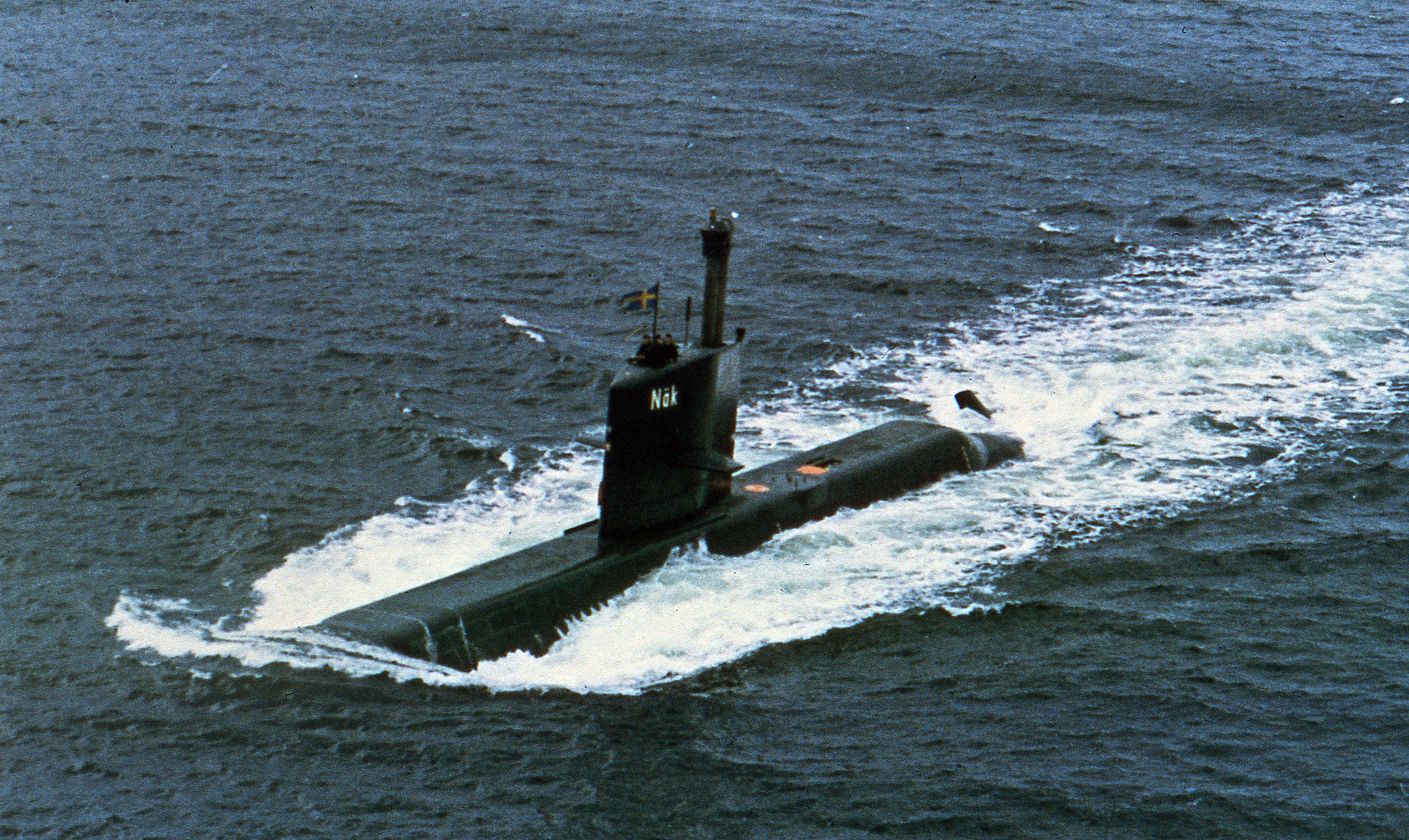
The Näcken was leased from Sweden in 2001, serving as the Danish submarine Kronburg then returned with conclusion of submarine operations in 2004.

The Danish submarine programme was suddenly abandoned. It was mentioned in the Defense Budget of 2005–2009, published in 2004, that the Royal Danish Navy's submarine weapons systems would be terminated One popular concept at the end of the Cold War was the peace dividend, in which dramatic cuts, often with a questionable wisdom, meant savings but not always in efficient way.

A leaked report from NATO defense planning process raised doubts about the need for Danish submarine capability in the common NATO defense. This report was widely shared in the public, and by major Danish newspapers, such as Jyllands-Posten. Earlier NATO assessments of capabilities requirements for the Royal Danish Navy stated that NATO required Denmark to have at least three coastal submarines, that Denmark could contribute to NATO. On March 3, in reply to the leaked report, the Ministry of Defense mentioned, that NATO would assess the need for Danish submarine capabilities to be used in the common NATO defense during the spring of 2004. Finally, it was noted in the Defense budget of 2005–2009, which was published in 2004, that the Royal Danish Navy would terminate the submarine weapons systems.

While the final decision to discontinue the submarine programme remains unclear, there has been speculation, that it was due to a lack of requirements for Danish submarine capabilities from NATO. A former adviser for the American NATO mission told The New York Times in 2023 that the Danish were "told to stop wasting money building submarines."

Danish submarines was operating several types in the early 21st century including:

- HDMS Narhvalen (S320) (Narhvalen class 500 long tons submerged) (decommissioned 16 October 2003)
- HDMS Nordkaperen (S321) (Narhvalen class)
- HDMS Tumleren (S322) (Tumleren-class)
- HDMS Sælen (S323) (Tumleren-class)
- HDMS Kronborg (Leased from Sweden, Näcken-class submarine)

Also, Denmark stopped its plans for the new Viking-class submarine.

== Reinvestment discussions ==
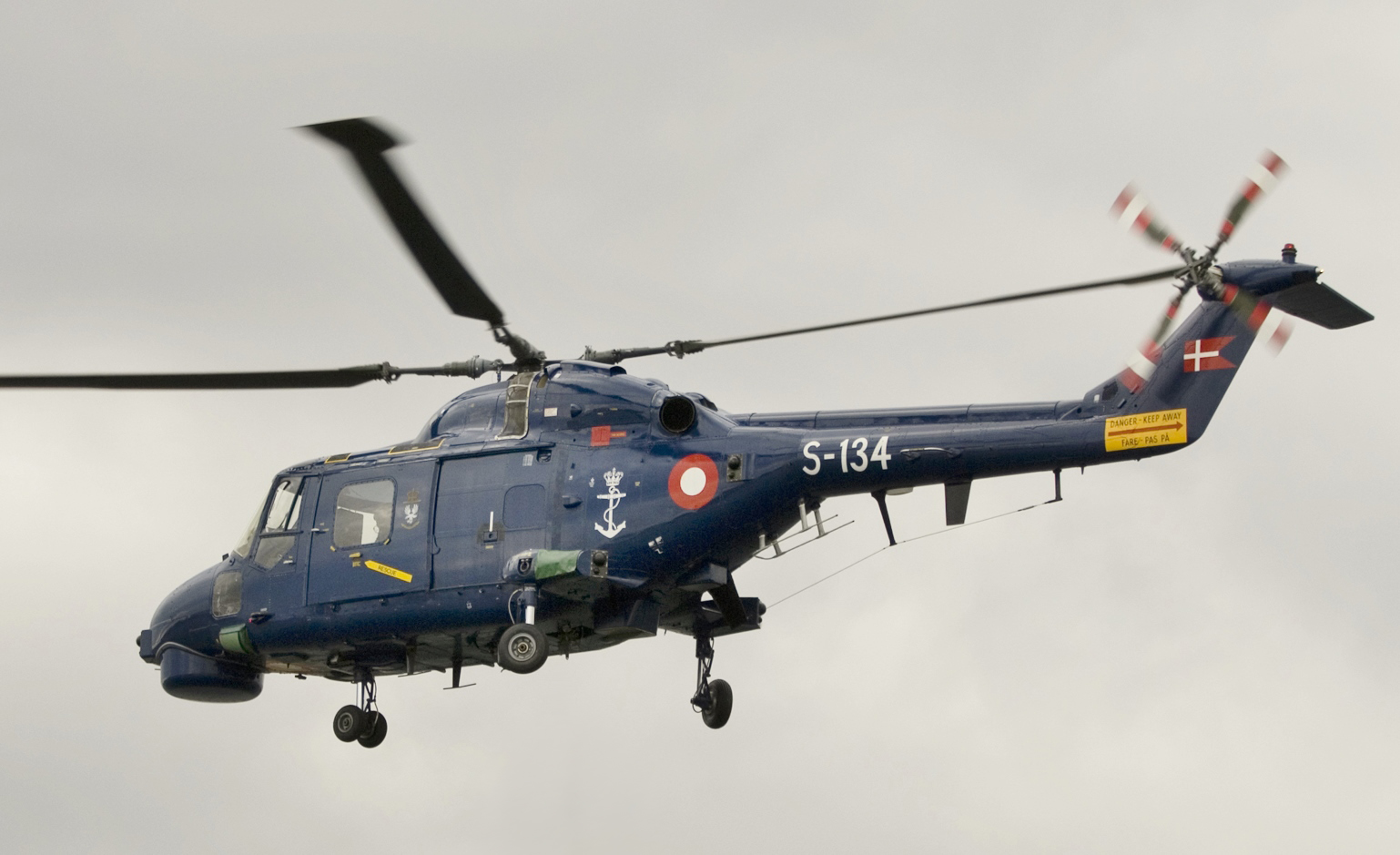
Danish Navy Lynx

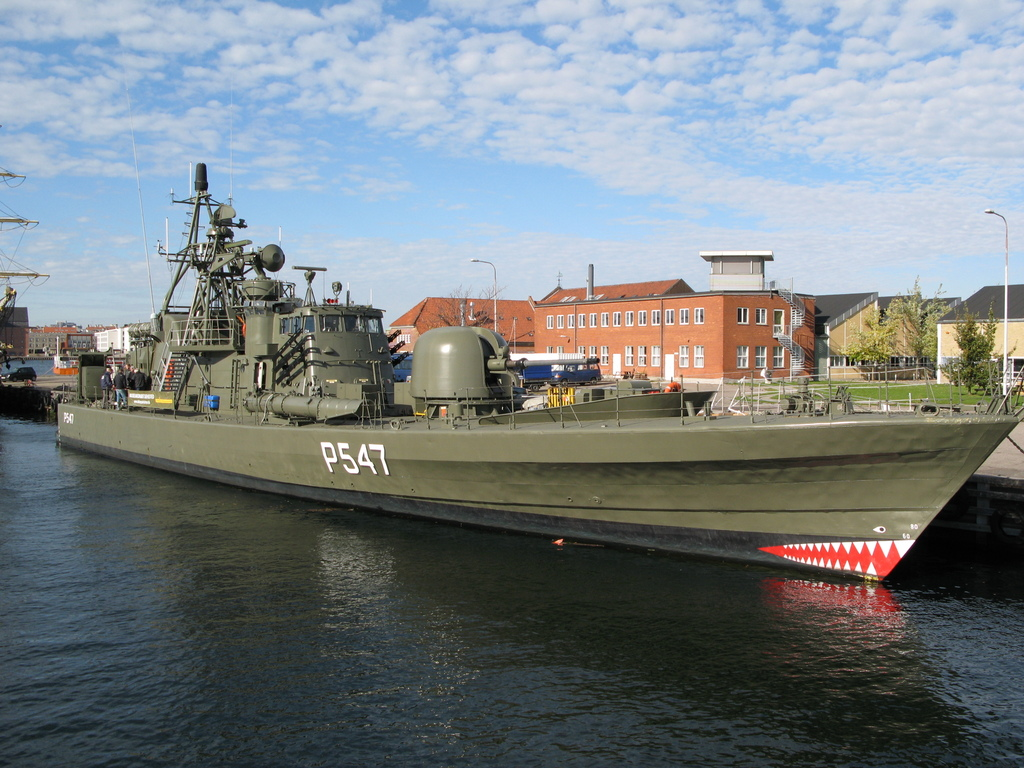
Danish missile boat

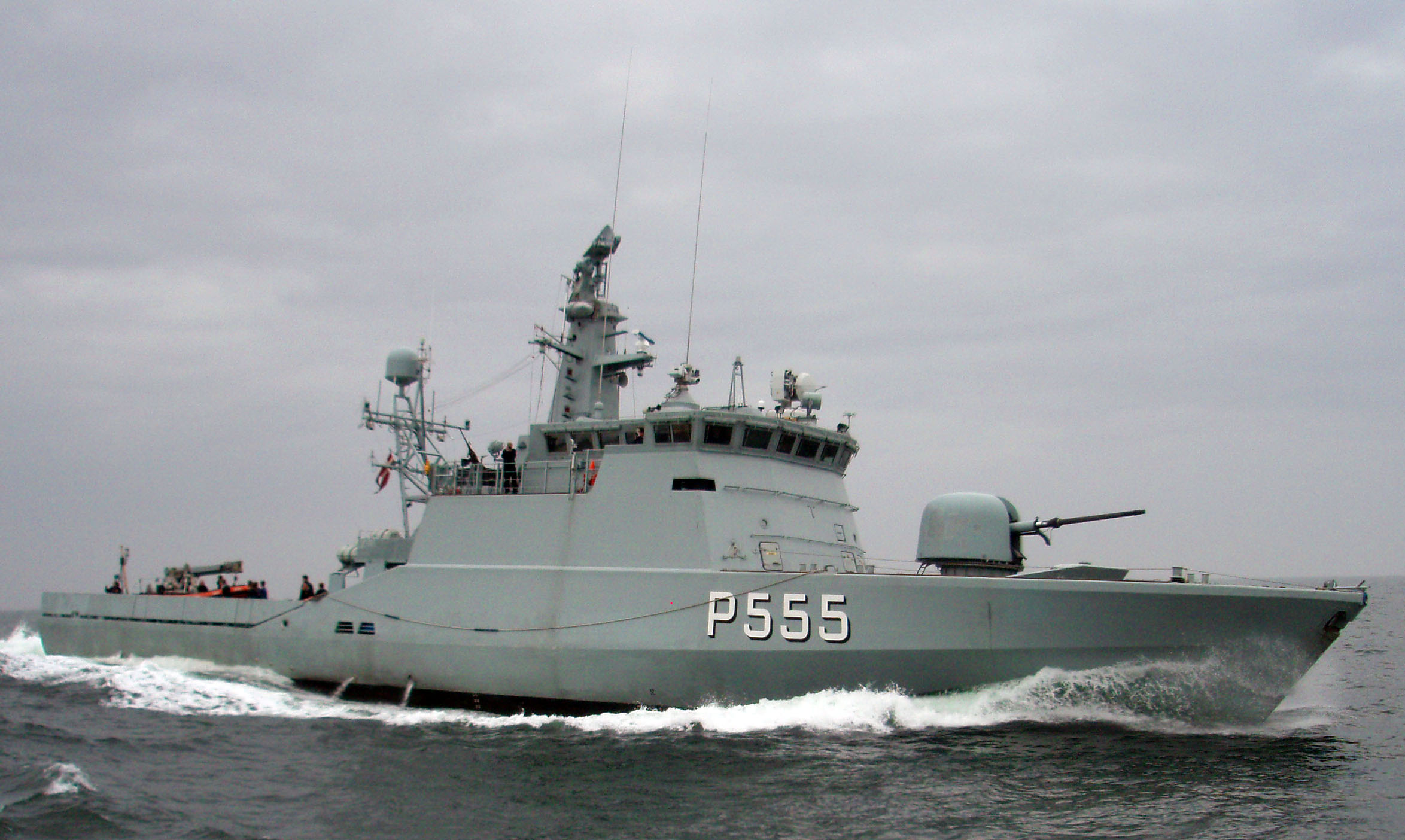
P555 patrol boat

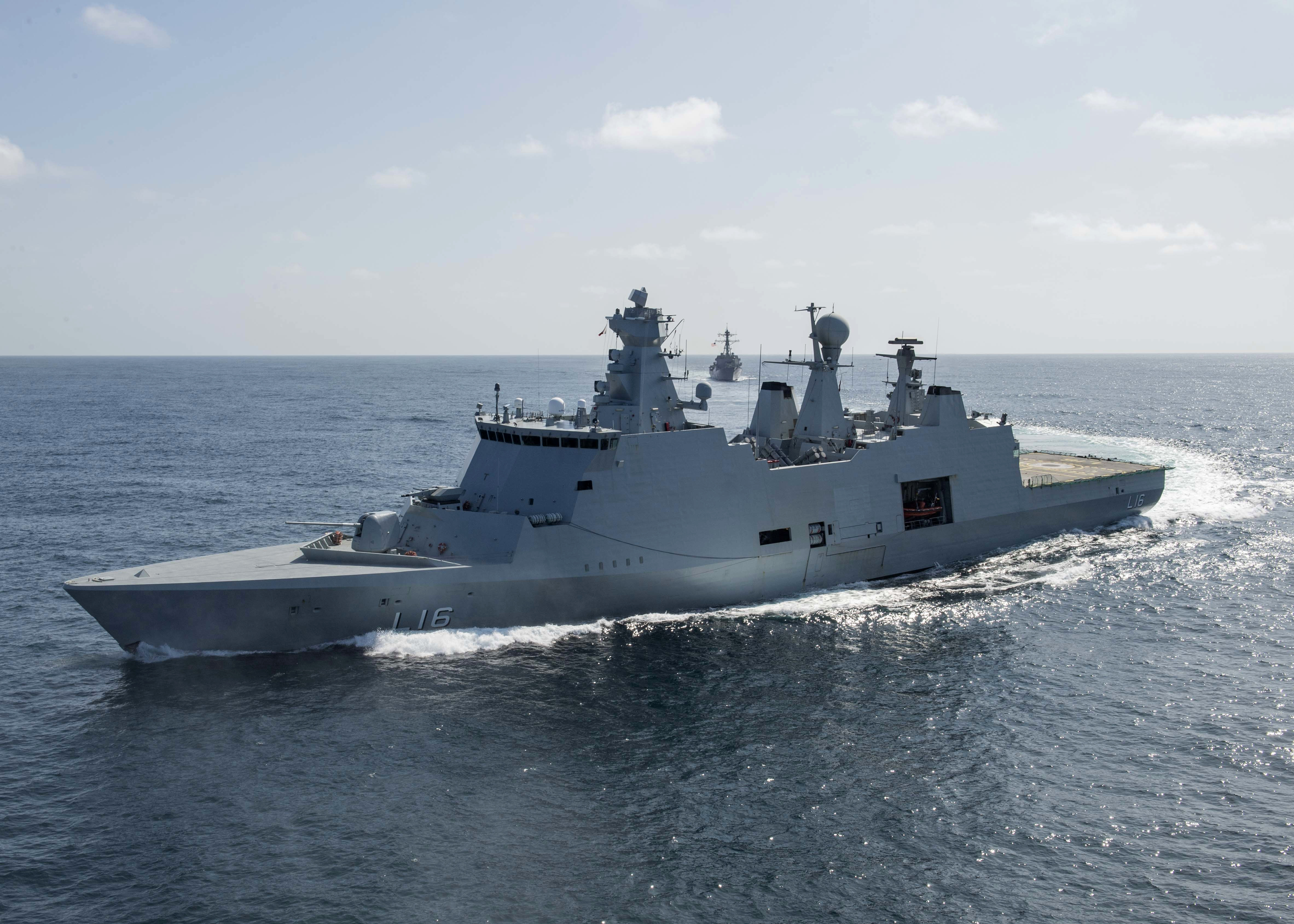
Absalon L16 underway

After the Danish submarine divestiture in 2004, there was a long period of two decades of peace and in turn, major cost savings for Denmark. Whatever the exact reasons, the overall defense posture in the region and operational demands allowed the plan to be executed. However, after twenty years Danish law makers are discussing a return to submarine-based defense systems, as part of its ongoing plans for safety and security.

Increasing great-power activity in the Arctic is widely mentioned in Danish foreign policy strategies and is also touted as a reason to increase the Royal Danish Navy's submarine capabilities. For example, Russian submarines have been spotted near Greenland, which has prompted a response from the Danish Defense ministry. Great-power activity in the Arctic is making the Arctic a more unstable area, which can be prone to increased risks of conflict, particularly between NATO and Russia. Seeing as Denmark has boundary disputes with Russia over the Continental Shelf north of Greenland, knowledge and potential counter-measures of Russian submarines becomes even more important for Danish maritime security.

The Royal Danish Navy has announced plans to increase ASW capabilities (anti-submarine warfare), in order to counter hostile submarines in potential future conflicts. As the NATO Defence Planning Capability Review of 2019/2020 states, Denmark faces more serious threats than in any other period since the fall of the Berlin Wall. The ASW capabilities that Denmark plans to increase, however, is mainly focused on countering hostile submarines with aerial weapons systems i.e. helicopters and fighter jets. The ASW capabilities could however also include attack submarines, which specialize in finding and countering hostile submarines.

The political parties Konservative Folkeparti (Conservative People's Party) and Dansk Folkeparti (Danish People's Party) has advocated for the return of submarine capabilities to the Royal Danish Navy. Arguments include that the submarines will improve the Danish naval defense, due to their ability to gather intelligence undetected, increasing the Royal Danish Navy's ability to detect Russian submarines, which regularly cross into Danish maritime territory. In addition, it is argued that having submarines in the Royal Danish Navy can increase potential partnerships and cooperation with other allied submarine-capable states.

Expert Johannes Riber Nordby from the Danish Defense College argue that having submarine capabilities will increase the Royal Danish Navy's deterrence force, as well as increase the ability for sovereignty enforcement on the large maritime areas of the Kingdom of Denmark, while remaining undetected. Nordby also points out, similarly to the other arguments, that having submarines will increase the sharing of information between Denmark's allied states on submarine activity in and near the Arctic. Undetected intelligence gathering of enemy submarine activity and naval activity is also mention by experts, as one of the most important reasons for acquiring submarines.

One of the main arguments against acquiring submarines for the Royal Danish Navy is the costs of submarines, as they are very expensive, compared to the relatively modest defense budget of Denmark. However experts point out the possibility of leasing submarines for a period of time, instead of acquiring new submarines for use in the Royal Danish Navy. The leasing of submarines is not foreign to Denmark, as Denmark leased the U-Class submarines in the post-war period of 1946–54 form Great Britain.

However, Denmark has been increasing its defense budget to increase security which makes possible diversifying naval capabilities in conjunction with its naval goals a renewed possibility.
