= Stollergrund-class multi-purpose ship =

Class of German Navy multi-purpose ships

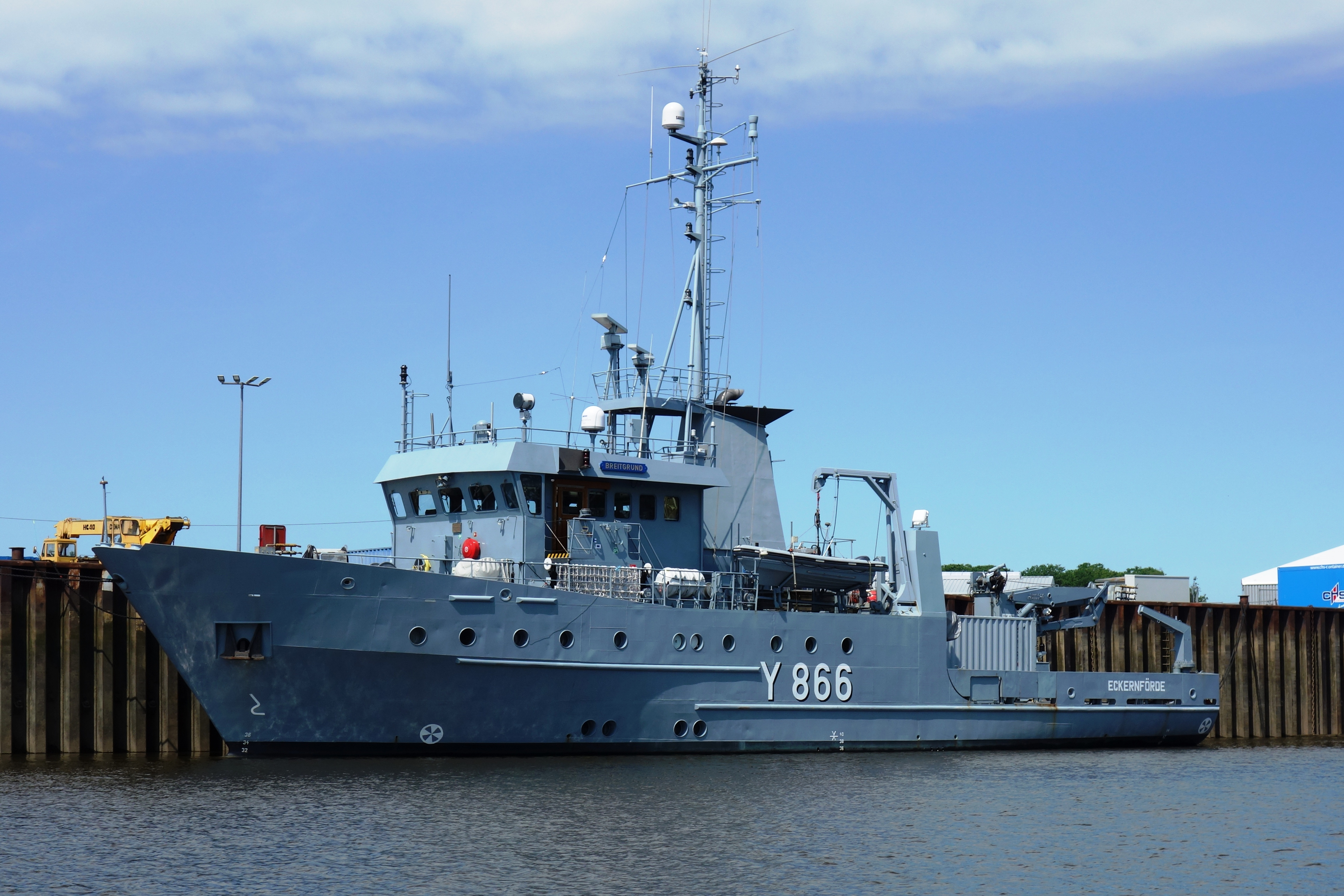
- Breitgrund

Class overview
- Name: Stollergrund class
- Builders: Kröger-Werft; Elsflether Werft
- Operators: German Navy; Israeli Navy
- Built: 1988–1990
- In commission: 1990–present
- Planned: 5
- Completed: 5
- Active: 5

General characteristics
- Type: Multi-purpose ship
- Displacement: 500 t (490 long tons)
- Length: 38.92 m (127 ft 8 in)
- Beam: 9.2 m (30 ft 2 in)
- Draft: 4.5 m (14 ft 9 in)
- Propulsion: 1 × KHD SBV 6 M 628 diesel motor, 1 × shaft, 890 kW (1,190 hp)
- Speed: 12 knots (22 km/h)

The Type 745 Stollergrund-class multi-purpose ship was a class of multi-purpose ships built for the Wehrtechnische Dienststelle 71 (WTD 71) of the German Navy in Eckernförde and the Marinearsenal Wilhelmshaven. Three units are still in use for the WTD 71, the other two boats were sold to the Israeli Navy.

== Development ==
As a replacement for older test and support vehicles, five small test boats (designation according to the list of ship numbers) were commissioned from Fr. Lürssen Werft as general contractor on 23 October 1987. The Stollergrund class is derived from the Schwedeneck class and was also built as a subcontract at the Kröger shipyards and the Elsflether shipyards.

The hull is made of steel and divided into eight compartments by seven bulkheads. For better maneuvering, cross-thrust steering systems are installed in the fore and aft. The boats are versatile and take the necessary equipment on board in two containers. Fixed equipment includes a ship's crane and accommodation for embarked personnel.

== Ships of class ==
Stollergrund-class multi-purpose ship
Pennant number	Name	Builders	Launched	Commissioned	Decommissioned	Status
Y863	Stollergrund	Kröger-Werft	1 September 1988	31 May 1989	2018	On sale
Y864	Mittelgrund	Elsflether Werft	26 April 1989	21 September 1989		Active
Y865	Kalkgrund	Kröger-Werft	2 February 1989	8 November 1989	30 September 2004	Sold to Israel as INS Bat Yam
Y866	Breitgrund	Elsflether Werft	2 October 1989	14 February 1990		Active
Y867	Bant	Kröger-Werft	13 July 1989	16 May 1990	9 May 2003	Sold to Israel as INS Bat Galim
