= German submarine U-9 (S188) =

Retired German Navy submarine

Coordinates: 49.3125°N 8.4464°E

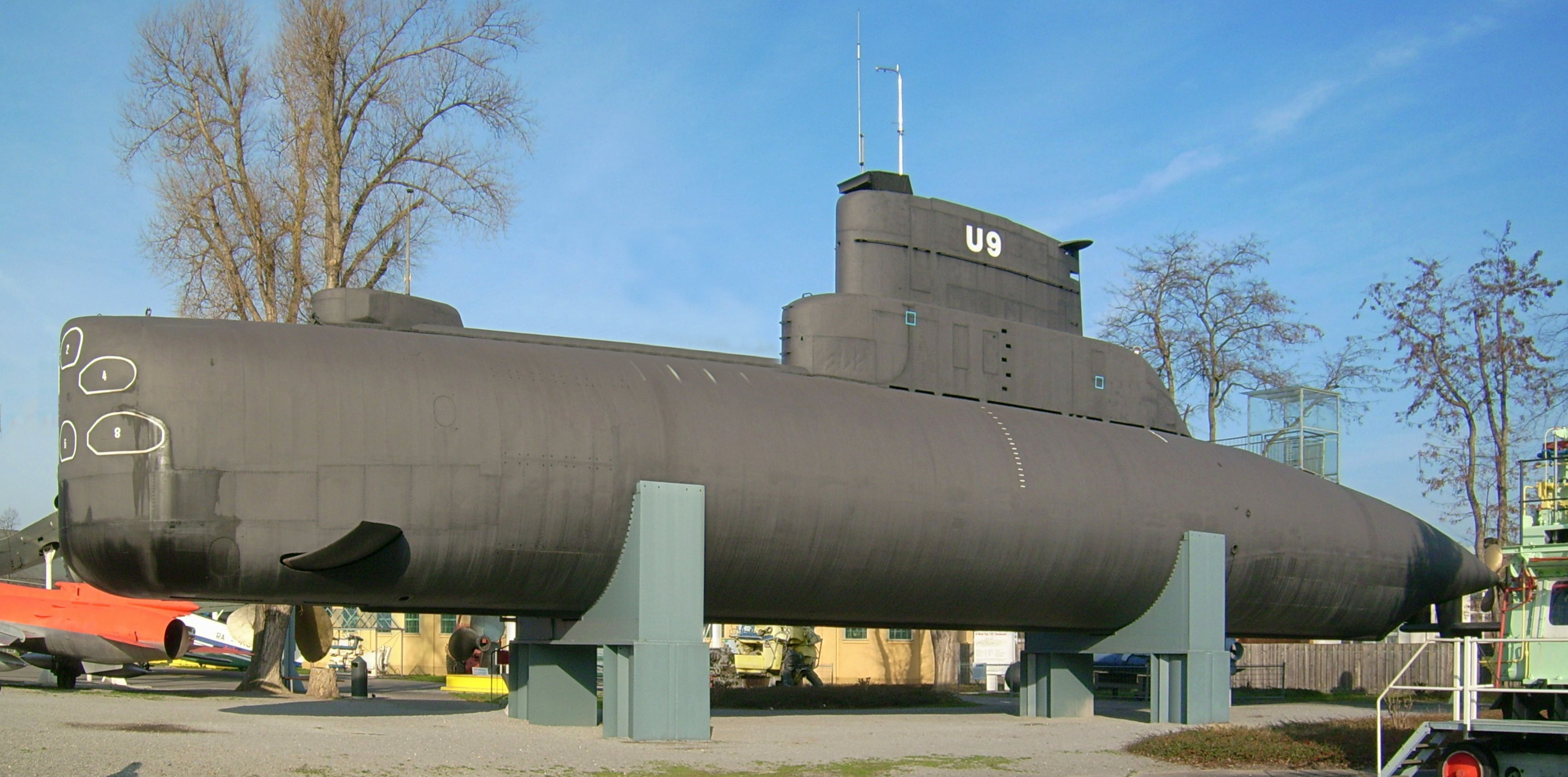
- Museum ship U-9 in the Technikmuseum Speyer.Museum ship U-9 at the Technikmuseum Speyer

History

Germany
- Name: U-9
- Builder: Howaldtswerke, Kiel
- Laid down: 10 December 1964
- Launched: 20 October 1966
- Commissioned: 11 April 1967
- Decommissioned: 3 June 1993
- Status: Museum ship at the Technikmuseum Speyer

General characteristics
- Class & type: Type 205 submarine
- Displacement: 450 long tons (457 t) surfaced; 500 long tons (508 t) submerged
- Length: 43.9 m (144 ft)
- Beam: 4.6 m (15 ft 1 in)
- Draft: 4.3 m (14 ft 1 in)
- Propulsion: 2 × 600 hp (450 kW) Mercedes-Benz 4-stroke V12 diesel engines each coupled to a BBC generator; 1 × 1,000 kW (1,300 hp) SSW electric motor
- Speed: 10 knots (19 km/h; 12 mph) surfaced; 17 knots (31 km/h; 20 mph) submerged
- Range: 4,200 nmi (7,800 km) at 5 knots (9.3 km/h; 5.8 mph) surfaced; 228 nmi (422 km) at 4 knots (7.4 km/h; 4.6 mph) submerged
- Test depth: 100 m (330 ft)
- Complement: 4 officers, 18 enlisted
- Armament: 8 × 533 mm (21 in) torpedo tubes; Torpedoes and naval mines

U9 (S188) is a retired Type 205 submarine of the German Navy. She was laid down on 10 December 1964 by Howaldtswerke of Kiel. U9 was launched on 20 October 1966 and commissioned on 11 April 1967. She was decommissioned on 3 June 1993, and is now a museum ship at Technikmuseum Speyer in Speyer.
