= Technik Museum Sinsheim =

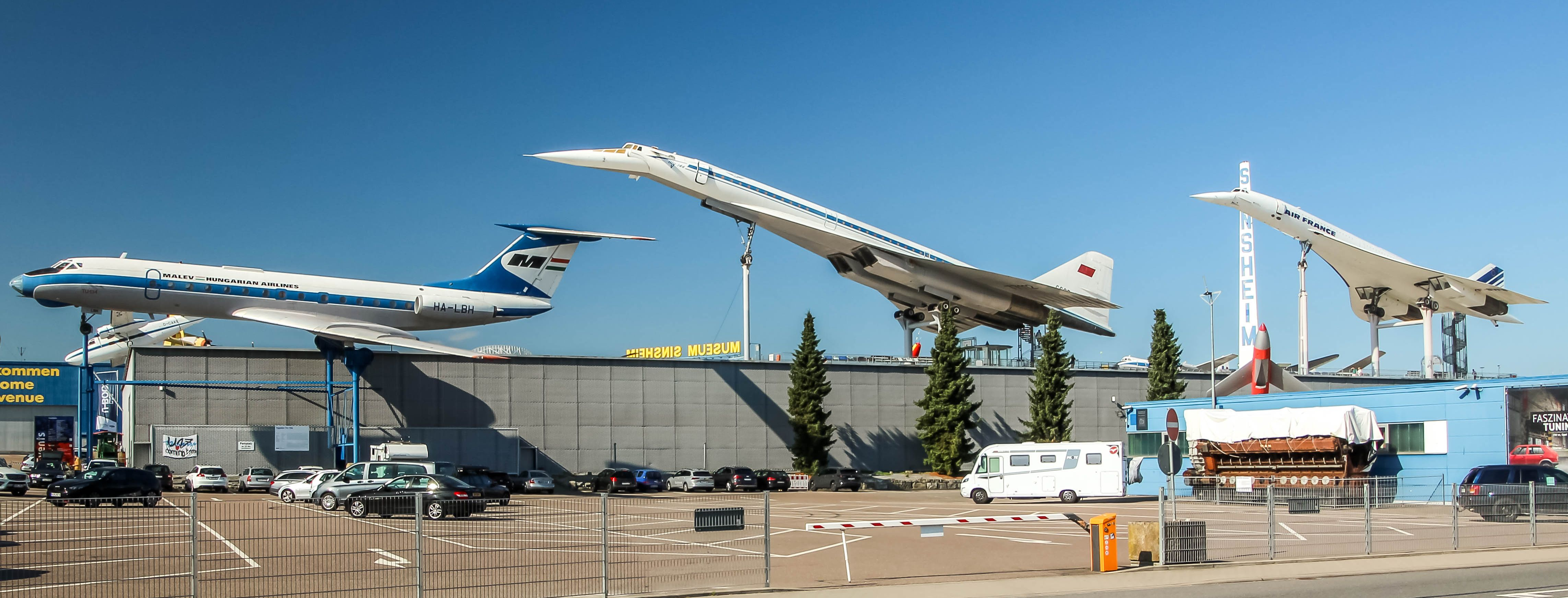
- Aircraft on display, including a Tupolev Tu-134, a Tupolev Tu-144, and a Concorde

- Location within Baden-Württemberg Location within Germany
- Former name: Auto & Technik Museum Sinsheim
- Established: 1981; 45 years ago
- Location: Sinsheim, Germany
- Coordinates: 49°14′19″N 08°53′48″E
- Type: Technology museum
- Collection size: 3,000
- Visitors: More than 1 million per year
- Website: sinsheim.technik-museum.de

The Technik Museum Sinsheim is a technology museum in Sinsheim, Germany. Opened in 1981, it is run by a registered association called "Auto & Technik Museum Sinsheim e. V." which also runs the nearby Technik Museum Speyer.

== Statistics ==
As of 2025, the museum had more than 3,000 exhibits and an exhibition area of more than 50,000 m^{2} (540,000 sq ft), indoors and outdoors. In addition to exhibitions, the museum also has a 22 m × 27 m (72 ft × 89 ft) IMAX 3D theatre. It receives more than 1 million visitors per year and is the largest privately owned museum in Europe.

== Exhibits ==
=== Feature exhibits ===
In 2003, Air France donated one of its retiring Concorde aircraft (F-BVFB) to the museum. With a Tupolev Tu-144 already on display since 2001, it is the only place where both supersonic passenger aircraft are shown. Both aircraft's preserved interiors can be accessed by the public.

The museum's alliance acquired Buran prototype OK-GLI in 2004 which opened as a walk-in exhibition at the Technikmuseum Speyer on 3 October 2008.

Sinsheim Museum also has the largest permanent Formula One collection in Europe along with Ferraris, motorcycles, land speed record holders and classic cars along with a large collection of military tanks, aircraft, and miscellaneous equipment.

The Sinsheim Auto und Technik Museum is open 365 days per year.

=== Walk-in aircraft ===
- Aerospatiale-BAC Concorde
- Tupolev Tu-144
- Junkers Ju 52
- Canadair CL-215
- Ilyushin Il-18
- Douglas DC-3
- Tupolev Tu-134

=== Other exhibits ===
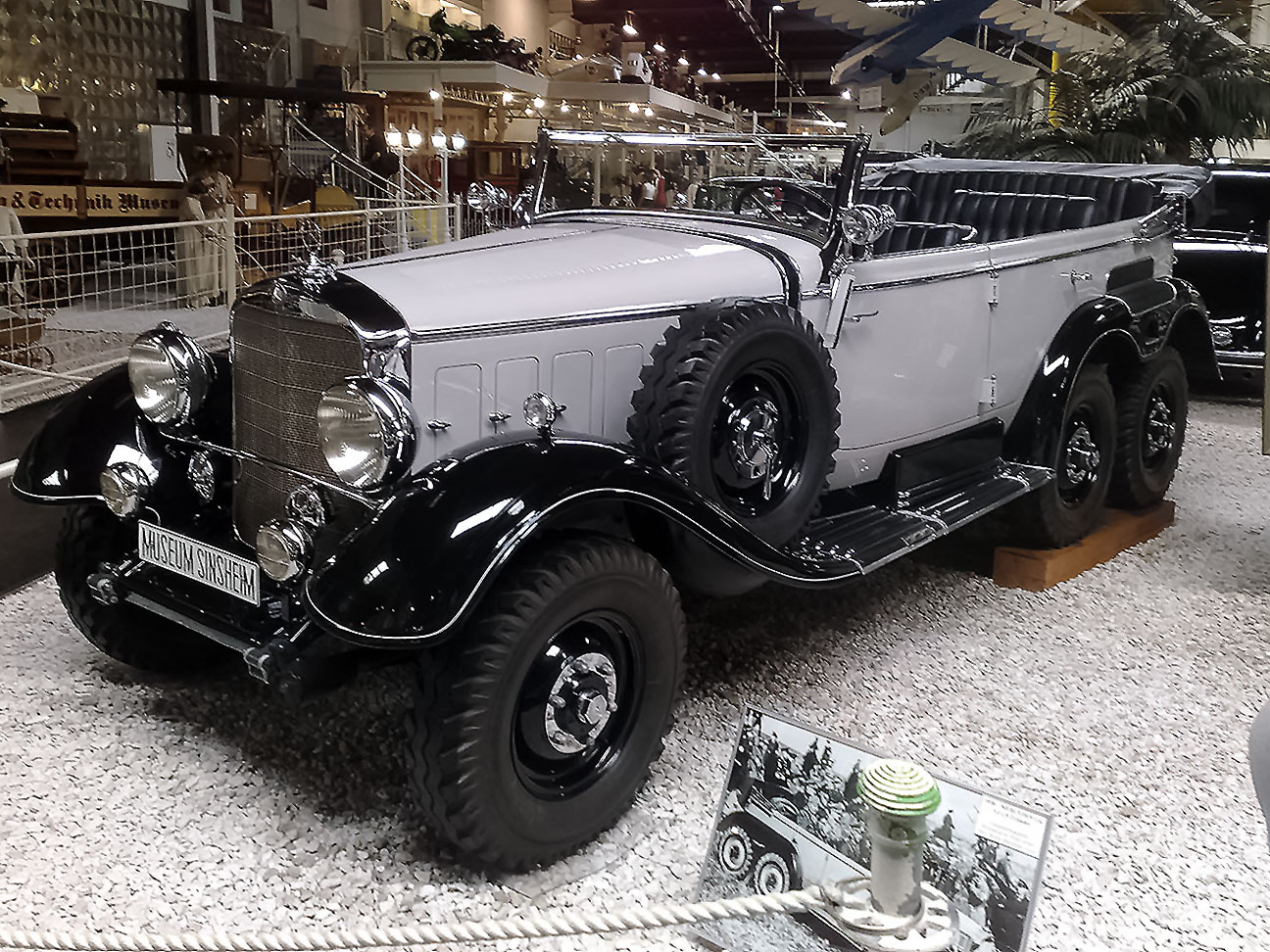
Mercedes-Benz W31 on display at the museum

- 300 vintage cars
  - Mercedes and Maybach collection
- "American Dream Cars" collection from the 1950s
- 40 race and sports cars
- Formula-1 collection
- "Blue Flame" – American rocket-propelled ground vehicle once holding the world speed record
- 200 motorcycles
- 27 locomotives
- 50 aircraft, including fighters from both world wars and the early jet era, passenger airliners
- 150 tractors
- Steam engines and trucks
- Mechanical organs
- Several early jet fighters and other aircraft
- Tanks, artillery and other military equipment.

== Access ==
The museum is easily reached by car and has a large car park. It also has a dedicated railway station as part of the local rail network.
