= Technology museum =

Type of museum

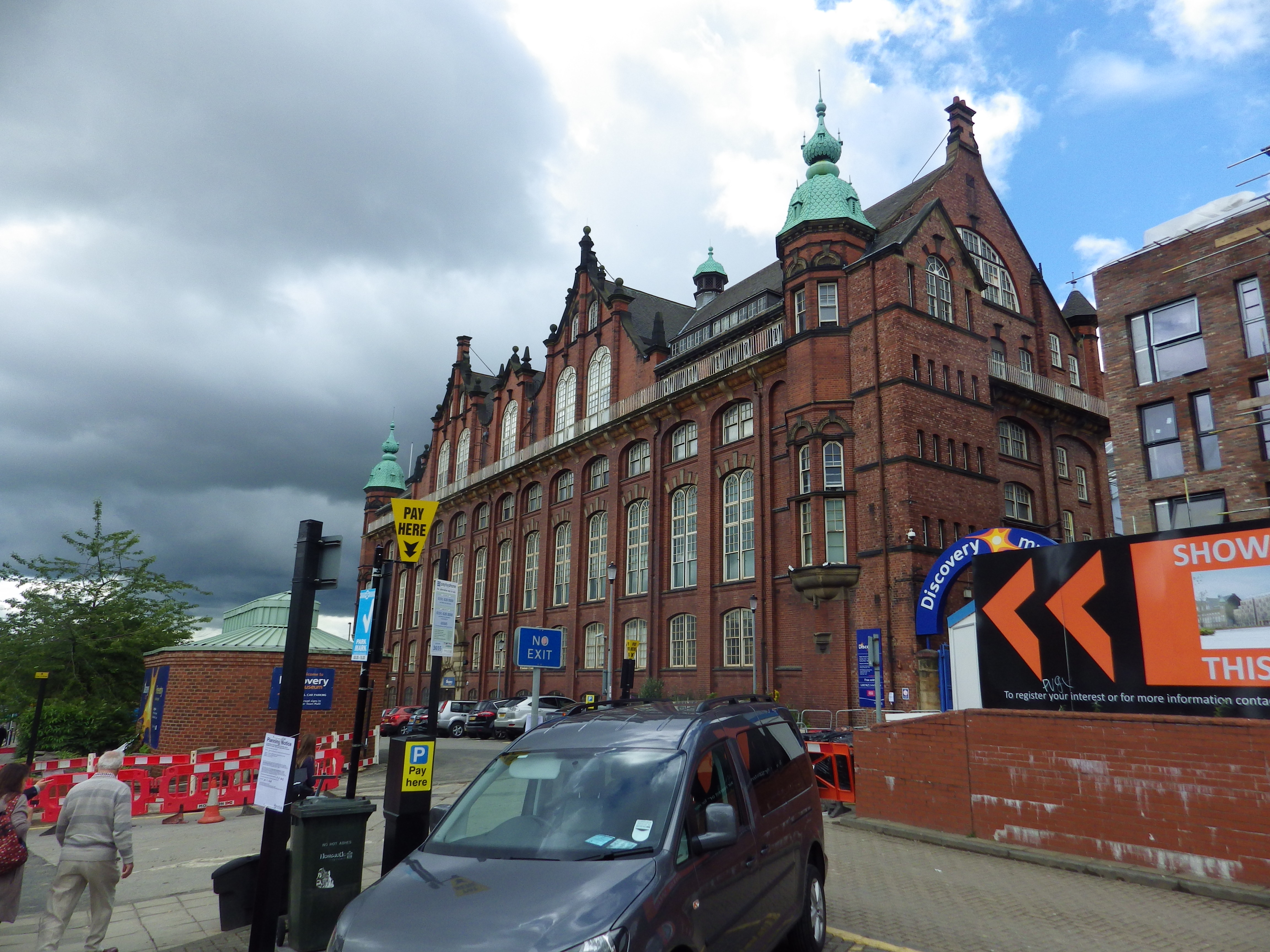
Newcastle Discovery Museum

A technology museum is a museum devoted to applied science and technological developments. Many museums are both a science museum and a technology museum, and incorporate elements of both museum genres. The goal of technology museums is to educate the public on the history of technology, and to preserve technological heritage. They also may aim to promote local pride in technological and industrial developments, such as the manufacturing materials on display at the Newcastle Discovery Museum. Some technology museums may simply want to display technological items, while others may want to use them to demonstrate how they function.

== Examples of Technology Museums ==
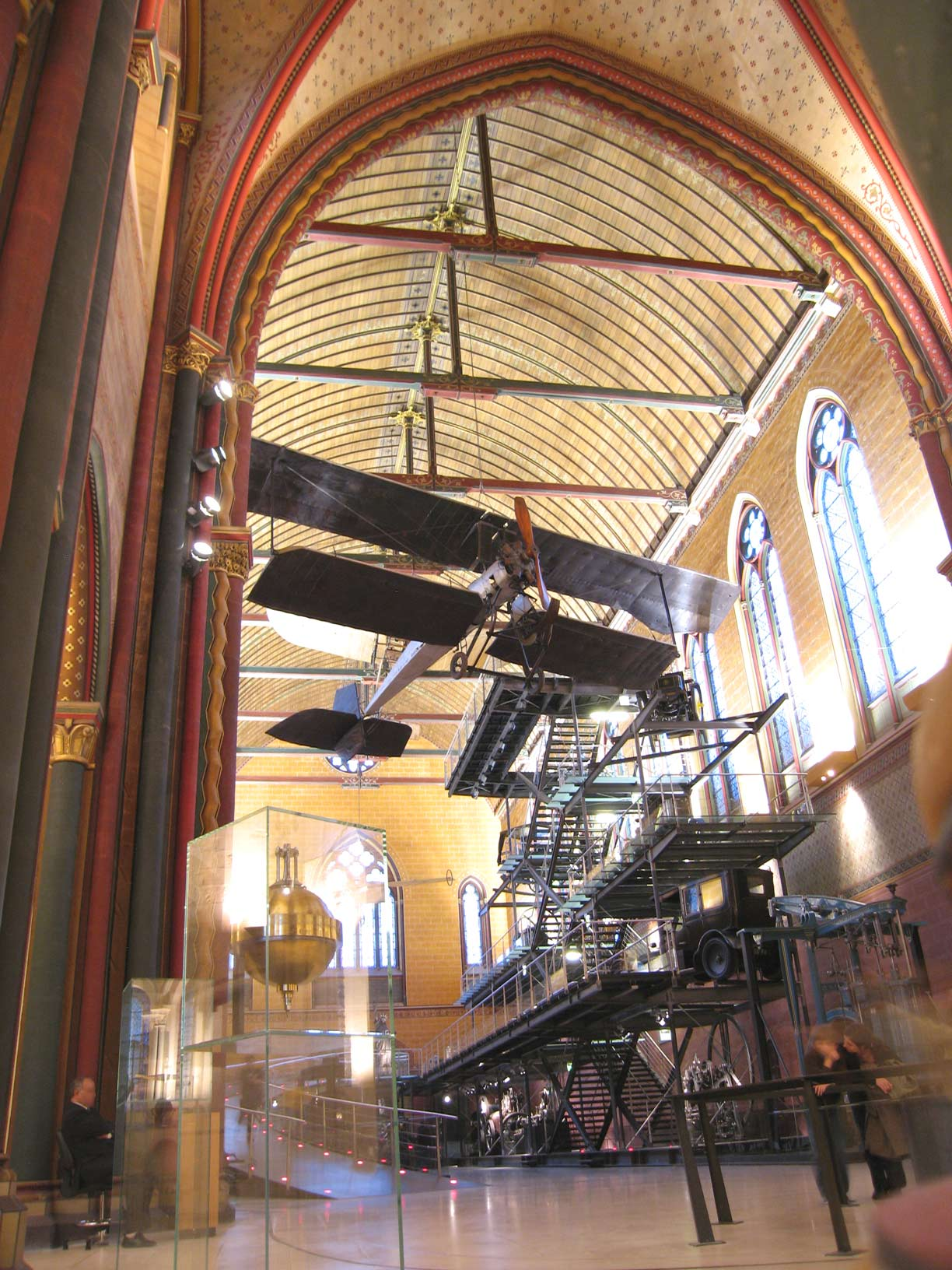
Exhibit Gallery in the Musee des Arts et Metiers in Paris, France

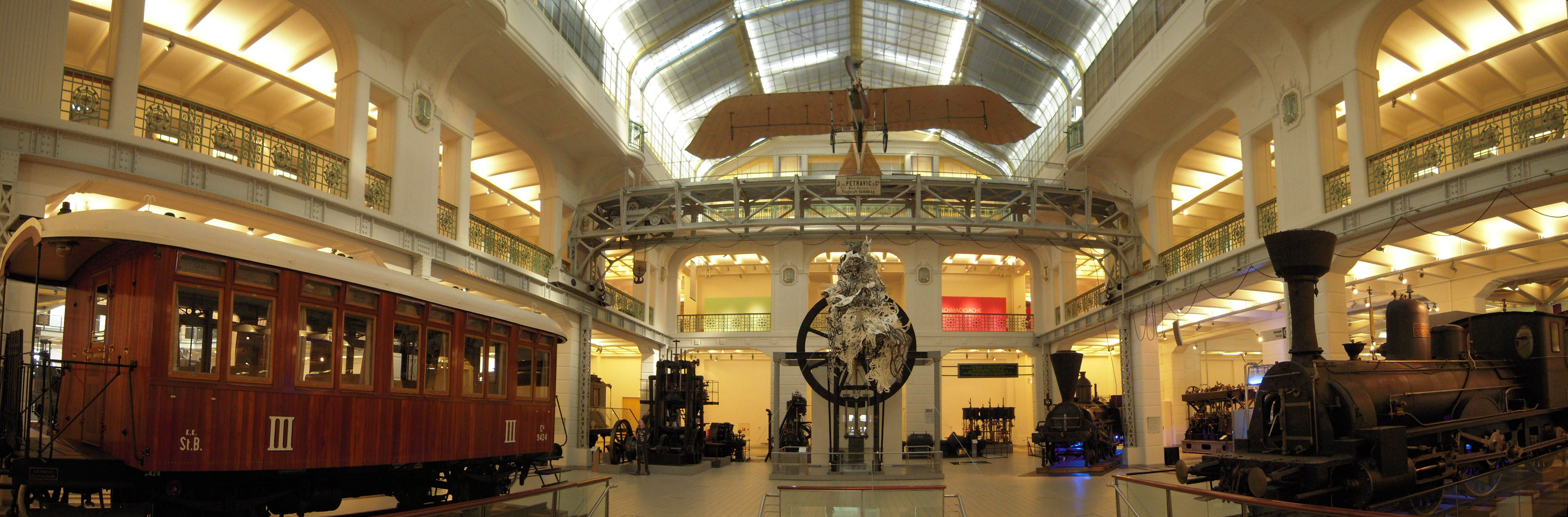
Technisches Museum Wien, entrance hall

Some of the most historically significant technology museums are:

- the Musée des Arts et Métiers in Paris, founded in 1794;
- the Science Museum in London, founded in 1857;
- the Deutsches Museum von Meisterwerken der Naturwissenschaft und Technik in Munich, founded in 1903; and
- the Technisches Museum für Industrie und Gewerbe in Vienna, founded in 1918.
- the Computer History Museum in California, founded in the 1970s.

Further technology museums in Germany include the Deutsches Technikmuseum in Berlin-Kreuzberg, the Technoseum in Mannheim, the Technik Museum Speyer, the Technik Museum Sinsheim and the Technikmuseum Magdeburg. The most prestigious of its kind in Austria is the Technisches Museum in Vienna.

== Technology on Display in Museums ==
Many other independent museums, such as transport museums, cover certain technical genres, processes or industries, for example mining, chemistry, metrology, musical instruments, ceramics or paper. Despite concentration on other fields, if there is extensive information on the technologies related to these subjects, the museum could be considered a technology museum. For example, elements of a technology museum could be incorporated with a marine science museum, a military museum, or an industrial museum. Semi-technology-focused museums typically “reflect some of the variety of applications of technology and present it within interestingly different contexts”.

=== Museum Buildings and Structures ===
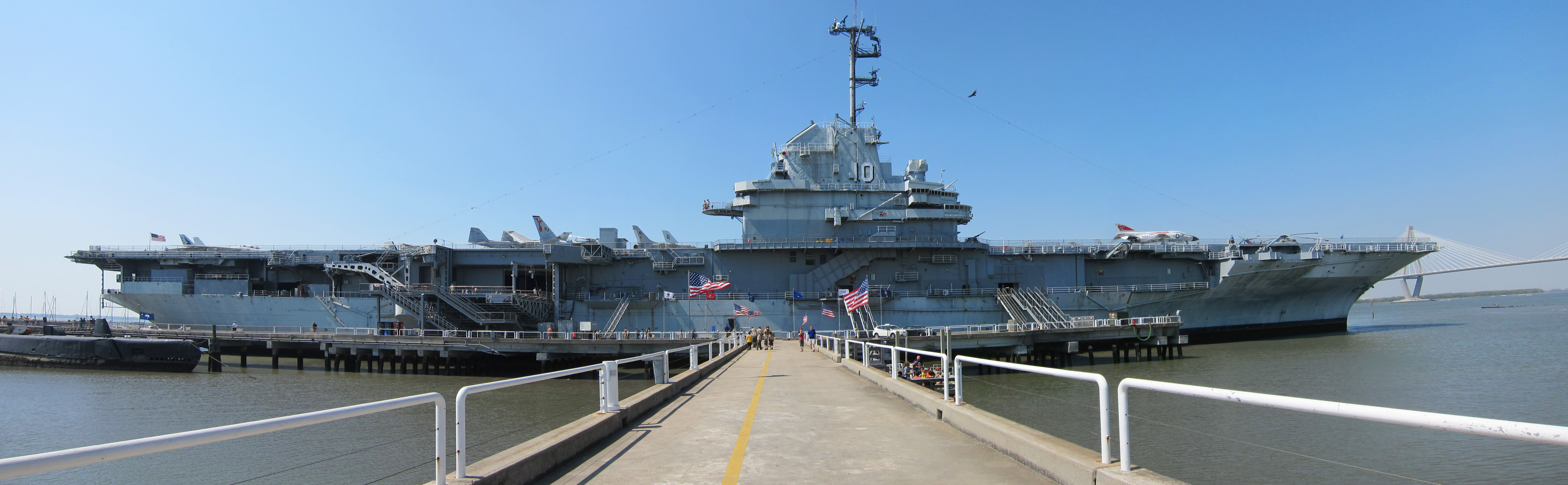
The USS Yorktown at Patriot's Point Naval and Maritime Museum

In some examples of this type of museum, the actual building is incorporated into the exhibition. A museum on mining technology may be housed inside a mining or colliery site, and a museum focusing on industrial technology might be inside a warehouse or former factory. Many naval and maritime museums follow this trend, such as the Patriots Point Naval and Maritime Museum in Mount Pleasant, South Carolina. The objects inside this museum are displayed inside the USS Yorktown – an aircraft carrier – and the USS Laffey—a destroyer. By housing exhibits inside relevant buildings and other structures, museums can display technology that supports their concentrations.

== See also ==
- Computer Museum
