= HDMS Narhvalen =

History

Denmark
- Name: Narhvalen
- Laid down: 16 February 1965
- Launched: 10 September 1968
- Commissioned: 27 February 1970
- Decommissioned: 16 October 2003
- Fate: Scrapped

General characteristics
- Class & type: Narhvalen-class submarine
- Displacement: 450 long tons (457 t) surfaced; 500 long tons (508 t) submerged
- Length: 43.9 m (144 ft)
- Beam: 4.6 m (15 ft 1 in)
- Draft: 4.3 m (14 ft 1 in)
- Propulsion: 2 × 600 hp (450 kW) Mercedes-Benz 4-stroke V12 diesel engines each coupled to a BBC generator; 1 × 1,000 kW (1,300 hp) SSW electric motor
- Speed: 10 knots (19 km/h; 12 mph) surfaced; 17 knots (31 km/h; 20 mph) submerged
- Range: 4,200 nmi (7,800 km) at 5 kn (9.3 km/h) surfaced; 228 nmi (422 km) at 4 kn (7.4 km/h) submerged
- Test depth: 100 m (330 ft)
- Complement: 4 officers, 18 enlisted
- Armament: 8 × 533 mm (21 in) torpedo tubes; Torpedoes and naval mines

HDMS Narhvalen (S320) was the lead ship of her class of submarine for the Royal Danish Navy. She was built to the German Type 205 design at the naval dockyard in Copenhagen where she was laid down on 16 February 1965. She was launched on 10 September 1968, and was commissioned into the Royal Danish Navy on 27 February 1970. In 1994, Narhvalen and sister ship Nordkaperen were modified to bring their technical performance more in line with the Royal Danish Navy's newer Tumleren class. Narhvalen was decommissioned on 16 October 2003.

== See also ==
- Submarines in the Royal Danish Navy
