= Technik Museum Speyer =

Technology museum located in Speyer, Germany

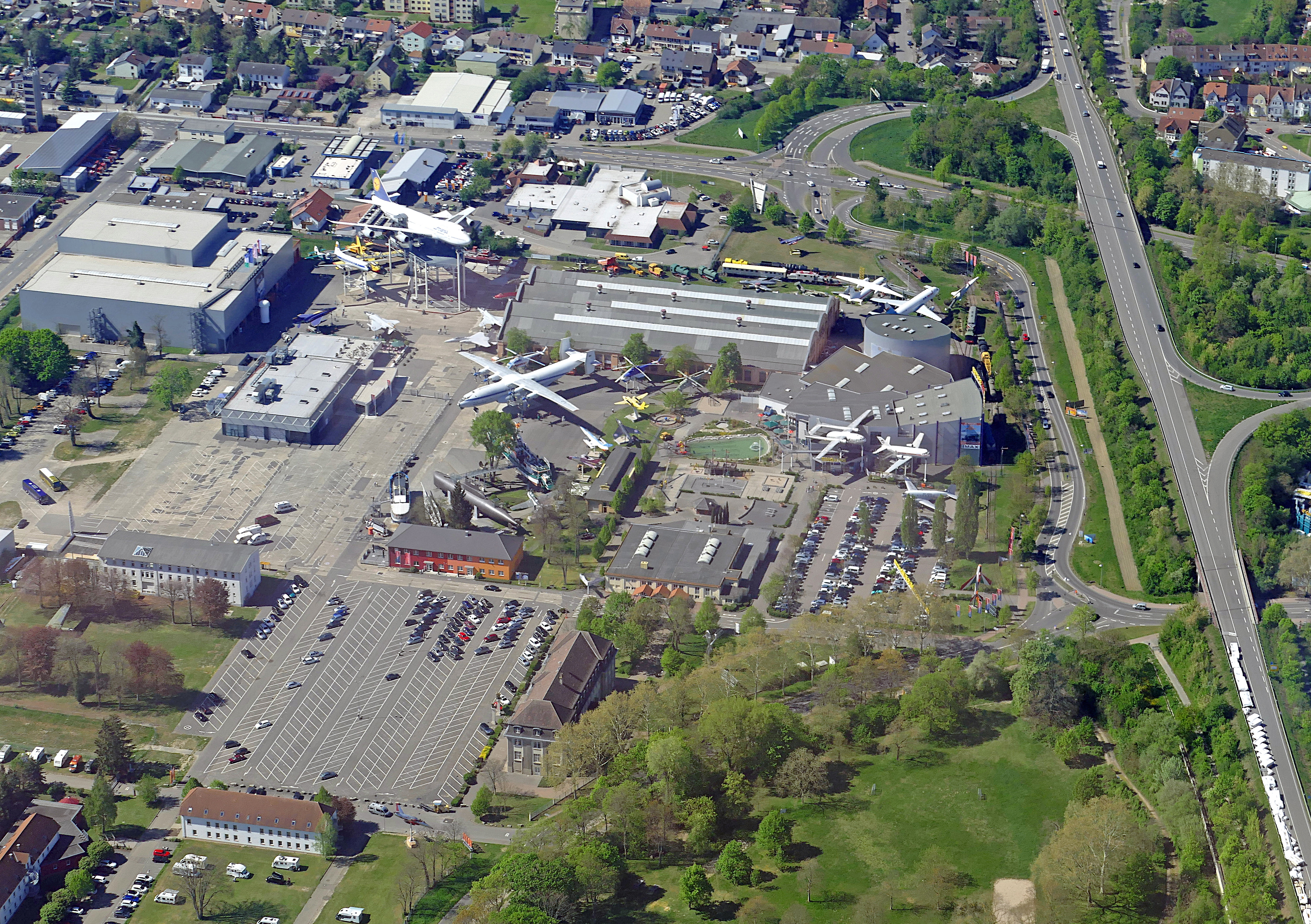
- Aerial overview of the museum's grounds

- Location within Rhineland-Palatinate Location within Germany
- Established: 1991; 35 years ago
- Location: Am Technik Museum 1; 67346 Speyer; Germany
- Coordinates: 49°18′45″N 08°26′47″E
- Type: Technology museum
- Website: Technik Museum Speyer (in English)

The Technik Museum Speyer is a technology museum in Speyer (Rhineland-Palatinate), Germany.

== History ==
The museum was opened in 1991 as a sister museum of the Auto & Technik Museum Sinsheim and is run by a registered alliance called "Auto & Technik Museum Sinsheim e.V.". As of 2004, it has more than 2,000 exhibits and an exhibition area of more than 150,000 m^{2} (indoors and outdoors). It attracts more than half a million visitors per year. In addition to the exhibitions, the museum also has a 22 m x 27 m IMAX dome theatre.

== Exhibits ==
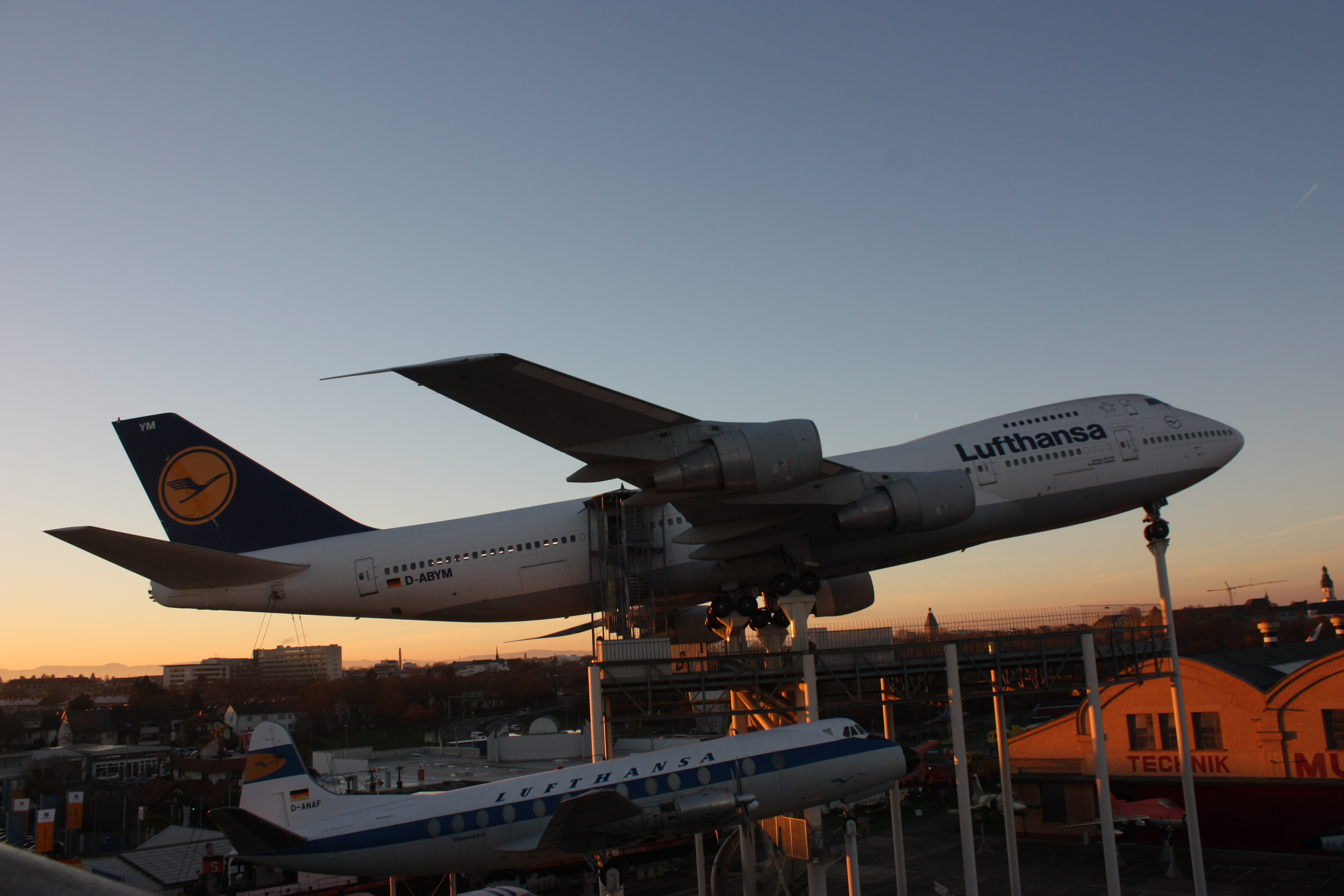
Two Lufthansa planes, renovated for visitor access

Central pieces of the exhibition include several preserved aircraft. In spring 2002, Lufthansa donated a retired Boeing 747-200 aircraft, which is now accessible to visitors. In April 2008, a Soviet/Russian Buran spacecraft, OK-GLI, was transported to the Technik Museum and is now another walk-in exhibit. Other walk-in highlights are an Antonov An-22 which was donated in Winter of 1999 from Antonov Airlines and several other aircraft types, locomotives, the houseboat Sean O'Kelley of The Kelly Family, and submarine U9 of the German Navy.

Other exhibits display fire engines, mechanical organs, vintage cars, motorcycles, locomotives, helicopters and military aircraft. Additionally, there is a maritime and miniature model museum section. There is also the Wilhelmsbau, a separate building which shows rare objects including historic fashion, weapons, jewels, dolls, toys, uniforms, and automatic musical instruments.
