= HDMS Nordkaperen (S321) =

Decommissioned submarine of the Royal Danish Navy

History

Denmark
- Name: Nordkaperen
- Laid down: 4 March 1966
- Launched: 18 December 1969
- Commissioned: 22 December 1970
- Decommissioned: 2 February 2004
- Fate: Scrapped

General characteristics
- Class & type: Narhvalen-class submarine
- Displacement: 450 long tons (457 t) surfaced; 500 long tons (508 t) submerged
- Length: 43.9 m (144 ft)
- Beam: 4.6 m (15 ft 1 in)
- Draft: 4.3 m (14 ft 1 in)
- Propulsion: 2 × 600 hp (450 kW) Mercedes-Benz 4-stroke V12 diesel engines each coupled to a BBC generator; 1 × 1,000 kW (1,300 hp) SSW electric motor
- Speed: 10 knots (19 km/h; 12 mph) surfaced; 17 knots (31 km/h; 20 mph) submerged
- Range: 4,200 nmi (7,800 km) at 5 kn (9.3 km/h) surfaced; 228 nmi (422 km) at 4 kn (7.4 km/h) submerged
- Test depth: 100 m (330 ft)
- Complement: 4 officers, 18 enlisted
- Armament: 8 × 533 mm (21 in) torpedo tubes; Torpedoes and naval mines

HDMS Nordkaperen (S321) was a Narhvalen-class submarine of the Royal Danish Navy. She was built to the German Type 205 design at the naval dockyard in Copenhagen where she was laid down on 4 March 1966. She was launched on 18 December 1969, and was commissioned into the Royal Danish Navy on 22 December 1970. In 1994, Nordkaperen and sister ship Narhvalen were modified to bring their technical performance more in line with the Royal Danish Navy's newer Tumleren class. Nordkaperen was decommissioned on 2 February 2004.

== See also ==
- Submarines in the Royal Danish Navy
