= Hiev-class crane ship =

Class of German Navy crane ships

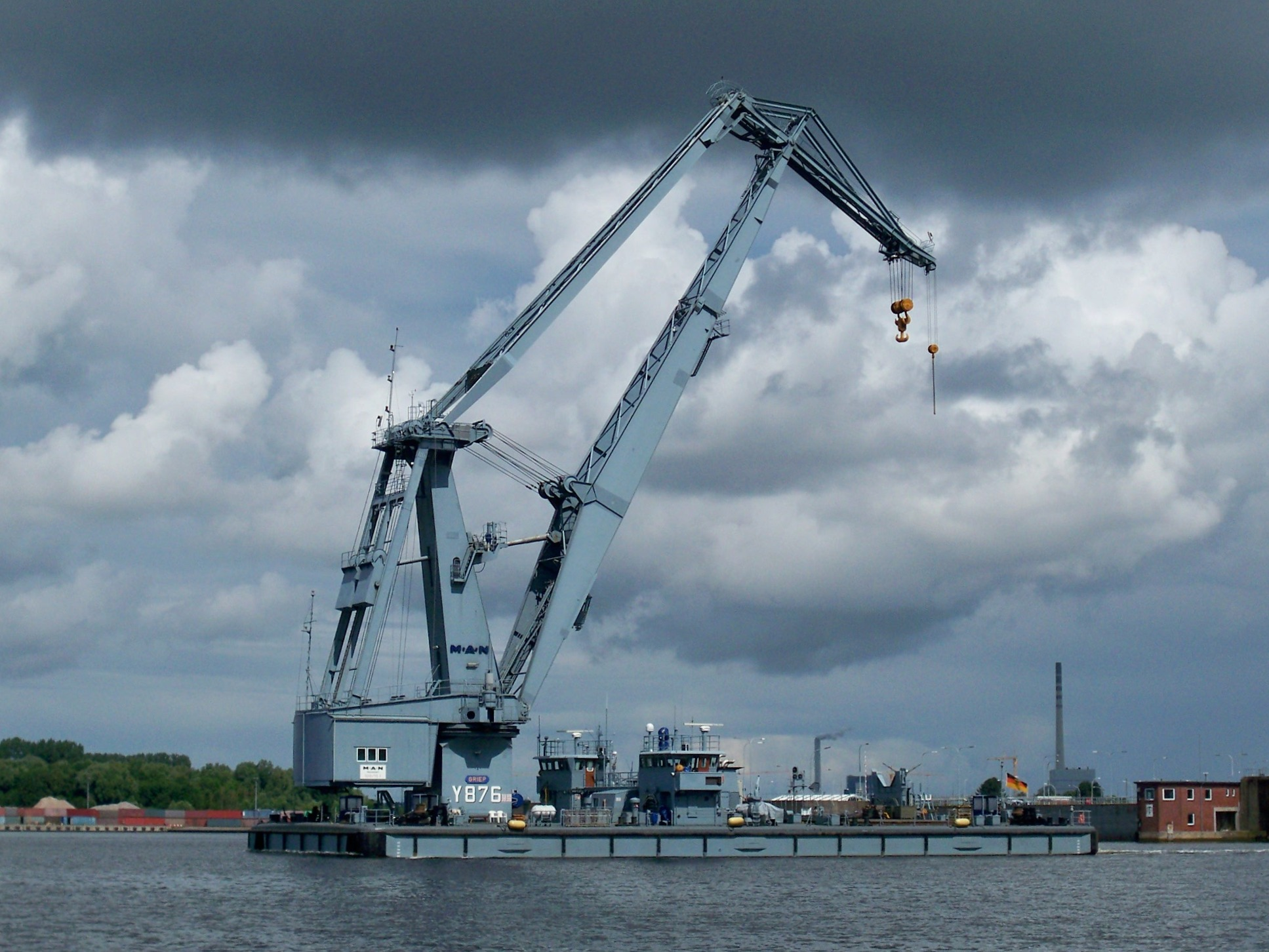
- Griep

Class overview
- Name: Hiev class
- Builders: Rheinwerft Walsum
- Operators: German Navy
- Cost: DM 4.3 million
- Built: 1960-1963
- In commission: 1962-present
- Planned: 2
- Completed: 2
- Active: 1
- Retired: 1

General characteristics
- Type: Crane vessel
- Displacement: 1,837 long tons (1,866 t)
- Length: 52.49 m (172 ft 3 in)
- Beam: 21.69 m (71 ft 2 in)
- Draft: 3.02 m (9 ft 11 in)
- Propulsion: 3 × MWM Diesel motors, 3 × shafts, 1,326 kW (1,778 hp)
- Speed: 6 knots (11 km/h)
- Complement: 6-12 crew

The Type 711 Hiev-class crane ship was a class of floating cranes built for the Marinearsenal of the German Navy in Kiel and Wilhelmshaven

== Development ==
Both cranes were built from 24 November 1960 for DM 4.3 million each under construction numbers 983 (Hiev) and 984 (Griep) at the Rheinwerft in Duisburg-Walsum and, after completion, relocated to their home ports via the inland waterways. The ship names are related to the task of the floating cranes and come from Low German: Hiev stands for “to lift” and Griep for “to grab”.

== Design ==
The self-propelled floating cranes have a triple diesel-electric drive, each consisting of a MWM four-stroke 16-cylinder diesel engine with 442 kW, a three-phase generator with 700 kVA, a direct current drive motor with 350 kW and a Voith-Schneider propeller. One of the propellers is in the bow area, the other two in the stern area.

The double-link luffing jib crane is a MAN product. The lifting capacities are 100 t with a radius of 16.2 m and 50 t with a radius of 28.5 m and a maximum hook height of 35 m above the waterline.

A galley, living quarters for twelve people and workshops allow a sea mission of up to ten days.

== Ships of class ==
Pennant number	Name	Builders	Launched	Commissioned	Decommissioned	Status
Hiev-class crane vessel
Y875	Hiev / Jade Hiev	Rheinwerft Walsum	27 January 1962	2 October 1962	31 December 2014	Sold to Jade-Dienst
Y876	Griep	Rheinwerft Walsum	5 May 1962	15 May 1963		Active
