= Type 201 submarine =

German submarine class

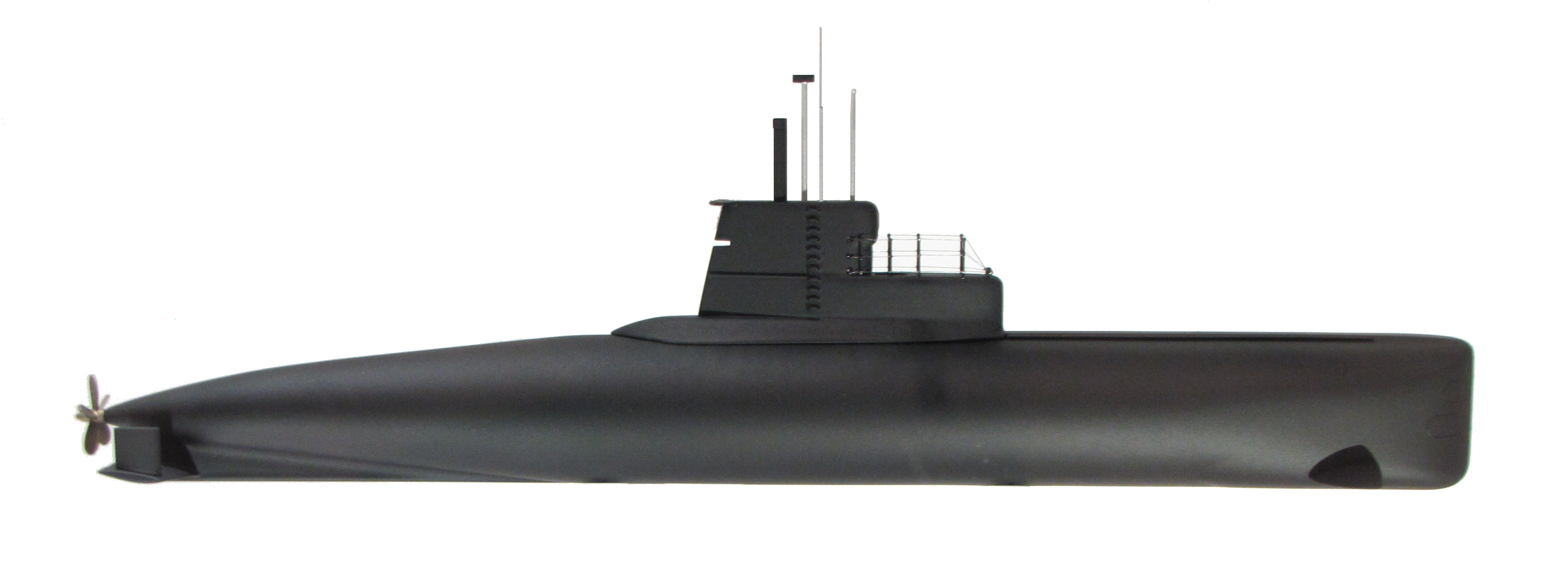

Class overview
- Builders: Howaldtswerke, Kiel, Germany
- Operators: German Navy; Royal Norwegian Navy
- Preceded by: Type XXIII U-boat
- Succeeded by: Type 205 U-boat
- Built: 1960–1962
- In commission: 1962–1967
- Planned: 12
- Completed: 3
- Canceled: 9
- Active: 0
- Retired: 3

General characteristics
- Type: Coastal U-boat
- Displacement: 395 t (389 long tons) surfaced; 433 t (426 long tons) submerged
- Length: 42.40 m (139 ft 1 in)
- Beam: 4.60 m (15 ft 1 in)
- Draft: 3.80 m (12 ft 6 in)
- Installed power: 880 kilowatts (1,180 hp) diesel generator
- Propulsion: 1,100 kilowatts (1,500 hp) electric motor
- Speed: 10.7 knots (19.8 km/h; 12.3 mph), surfaced; 17.5 knots (32.4 km/h; 20.1 mph), submerged
- Range: 3,800 nautical miles (7,000 km; 4,400 mi), surfaced; 270 nautical miles (500 km; 310 mi) at 3 knots (5.6 km/h; 3.5 mph), submerged
- Test depth: 100 metres (330 ft)
- Complement: 21
- Sensors & processing systems: sonar, radar, periscope, GHG
- Armament: 8 × 533 millimetres (21.0 in) torpedo tubes, 8 torpedoes (no reloads) or; 16 naval mines

The Type 201 was Germany's first U-boat class built after World War II.

== Design ==
They were built out of amagnetic steel to counter the threat of magnetic naval mines, but the material had been insufficiently tested and proved to be problematic in service with the Bundesmarine. Microscopic cracks in the pressure hull forced the cancellation of nine of the twelve ordered submarines and the rebuilding of the first two boats as Type 205 submarines. Responsible for the design and construction was the Ingenieurkontor Lübeck (IKL) headed by Ulrich Gabler.

The price per unit was around 12 million Deutsche Mark.

== List of boats ==
Pennant number	Name	Shipyard	Laid down	Launched	Com- missioned	Decom- missioned	fate
S180	U-1	Howaldtswerke	8 June 1960	2 October 1961	20 March 1962	22 June 1963	scrapped 1967
S181	U-2	Howaldtswerke	1 September 1960	25 January 1962	3 May 1962	15 August 1963	scrapped 1967
S182	U-3	Howaldtswerke	12 October 1960	7 May 1962	20 June 1964	15 September 1967	intentionally destroyed in trials in high pressure chamber "Dock C" (Marinearsenal Kiel 1971), scrapped

U-3 was loaned to the Royal Norwegian Navy and served under the name Kobben from between 10 July 1962 and 20 June 1964 before being commissioned in the German Navy.
