= Schwedeneck-class multi-purpose ship =

Class of German Navy multi-purpose utility ships

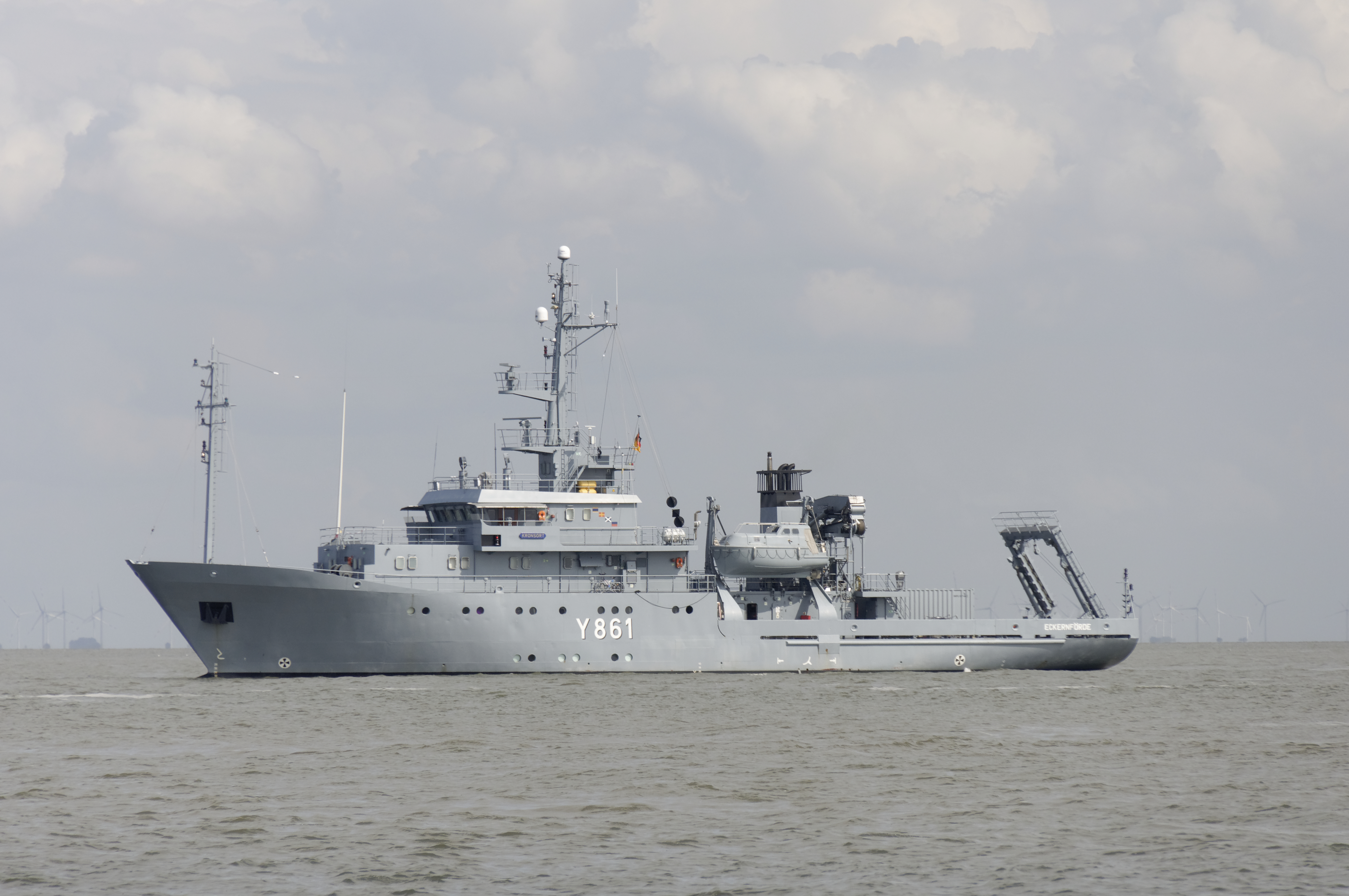
- Kronsort

Class overview
- Name: Schwedeneck class
- Builders: Kröger-Werft; Elsflether Werft; Nobiskrug
- Operators: German Navy
- Built: 1986–1988
- In commission: 1987–present
- Planned: 4
- Completed: 3
- Canceled: 1
- Active: 2
- Retired: 1

General characteristics
- Type: Multi-purpose ships
- Displacement: 1,000 long tons (1,000 t)
- Length: 56.5 m (185 ft 4 in)
- Beam: 10.8 m (35 ft 5 in)
- Draft: 3.27 m (10 ft 9 in)
- Propulsion: 1 × Siemens 1FR6909 Diesel motor, 1 × shaft, 1,095 kW (1,468 hp)
- Speed: 12 knots (22 km/h)
- Complement: 13-23 crew

The Type 748 Schwedeneck-class multi-purpose ship was a class of multi-purpose ships built for the Wehrtechnische Dienststelle 71 (WTD 71) of the German Navy in Eckernförde and the Marinearsenal Wilhelmshaven. Two units are still in use for the WTD 71.

== Development ==
As a replacement for the test boats Adolf Bestelmeyer, Friedrich Voge, Rudolf Diesel and Hans Christian Oersted built in the 1940s, three medium test boats, (ship type according to the ship number list) were commissioned from Fr. Lürssen Werft as general contractor. Subcontractors were the Kröger shipyard, the Elsflether shipyard and Nobiskrug. A fourth ship of this class was cancelled.

The hull is made of steel and divided into nine compartments by eight bulkheads. For better maneuvering, transverse thruster systems creating 150 kW each are installed in the fore and aft. The ships are used in a variety of ways and take the required equipment on board in containers. The fixed equipment includes a ship's crane, a swiveling A-frame at the stern, a pinasse and accommodation for embarked test personnel.

The state of Mecklenburg-Western Pomerania bought Schwedeneck in 2010 and had it converted into the research ship Elisabeth Mann Borgese at the Peene shipyard in Wolgast.

== Ships of class ==
Pennant number	Name	Builders	Launched	Commissioned	Decommissioned	Status
Rhine-class tender
Y860	Schwedeneck	Kröger-Werft	14 October 1986	20 October 1987	February 2011	Converted to civilian use
Y861	Kronsort	Elsflether Werft	9 May 1987	2 December 1987		Active
Y862	Helmsand	Nobiskrug	31 July 1987	11 February 1988		Active
Cancelled
