= Type 205 submarine =

German submarine class

- 205-class profile

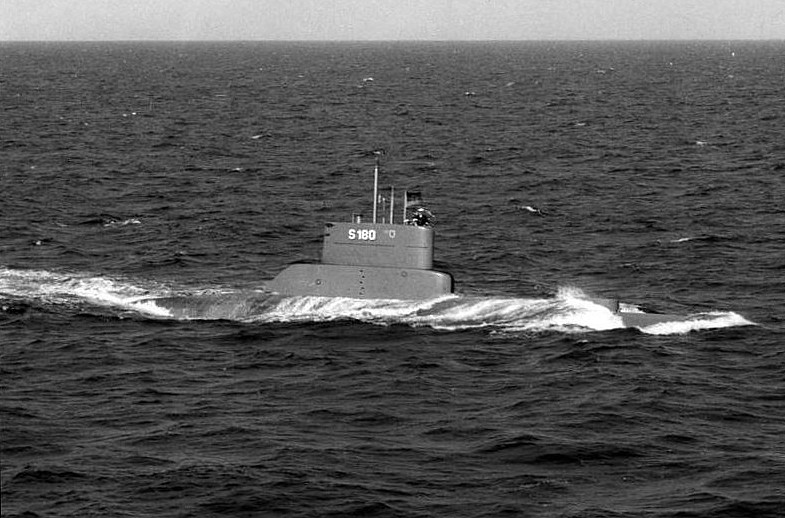
- Type 205 submarine U-1 (S180)

Class overview
- Builders: Howaldtswerke, Kiel; Copenhagen Naval Dockyard
- Operators: German Navy; Royal Danish Navy
- Preceded by: Type 201 submarine
- Succeeded by: Type 206 submarine
- Subclasses: Kobben-class submarine
- In commission: 1962–2005
- Completed: 13
- Retired: 13
- Preserved: 3

General characteristics
- Type: Submarine
- Displacement: 419 tonnes (412 long tons) surfaced; 455 t (448 long tons) submerged
- Length: 44.30 m (145.3 ft)
- Beam: 4.59 m (15 ft 1 in)
- Draft: 3.80 m (12 ft 6 in)
- Propulsion: 2 × 440 kW (590 hp) Mercedes-Benz 4-stroke V12 diesel engines each coupled to a BBC generator; 1 × 1,100 kW (1,500 hp) SSW electric motor
- Speed: 10 knots (19 km/h; 12 mph) surfaced; 17 knots (31 km/h; 20 mph) submerged
- Range: 3,950 nmi (7,320 km; 4,550 mi) at 4 knots (7.4 km/h; 4.6 mph) surfaced; 228 nmi (422 km; 262 mi) at 4 knots (7.4 km/h; 4.6 mph) submerged
- Test depth: 100 m (330 ft)
- Complement: 4 officers, 18 enlisted
- Armament: 8 × 533 mm (21 in) torpedo tubes; Torpedoes and naval mines

The Type 205 was a class of German diesel-electric submarines. They were single-hull vessels optimized for the use in the shallow Baltic Sea. The Type 205 is a direct evolution of the Type 201 class with lengthened hull, new machinery and sensors. The biggest difference though is that ST-52 steel is used for the pressure hull since the Type 201's non-magnetic steel proved to be problematic. Type 206, the follow-on class, finally succeeded with non-magnetic steel hulls.

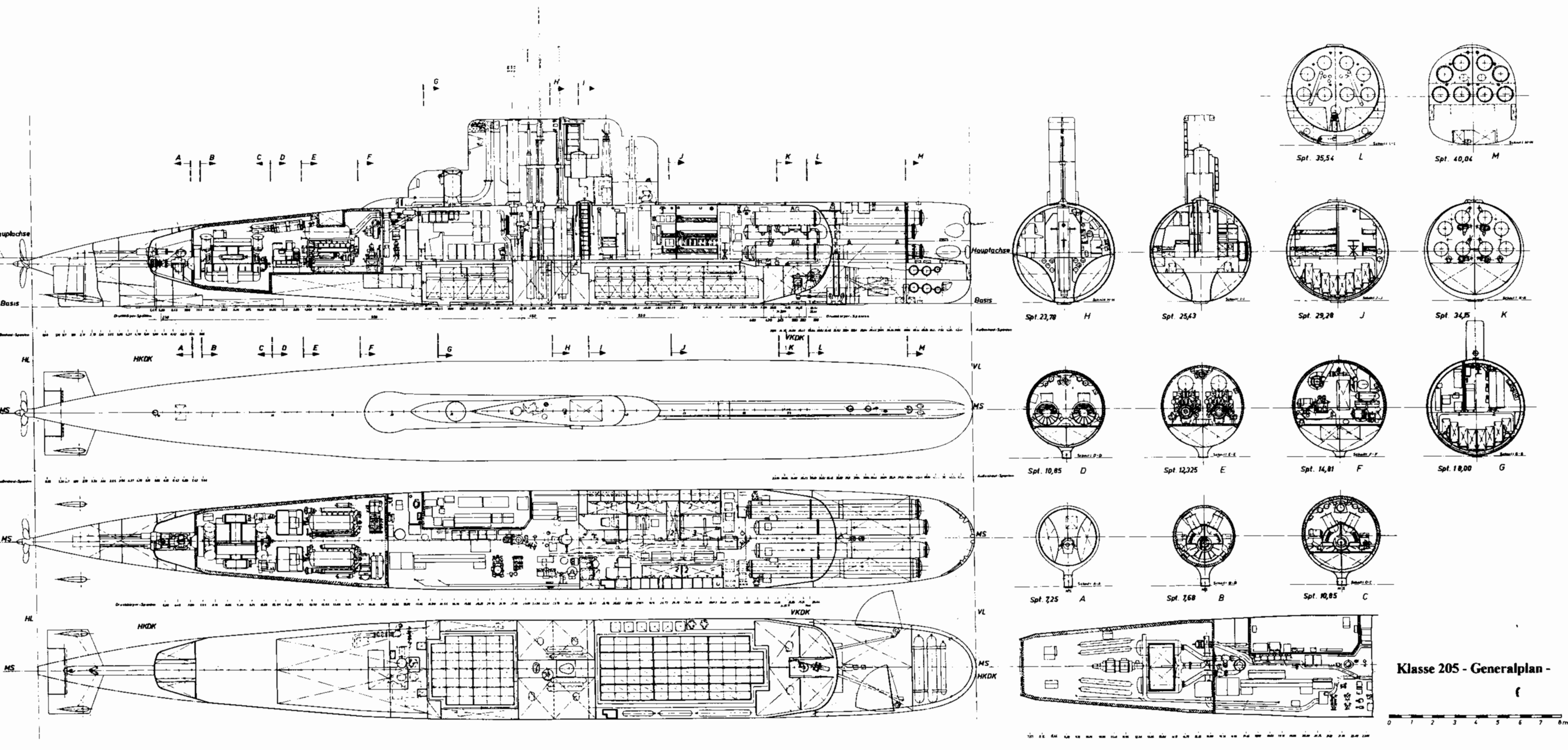
Plans of the 205 submarine

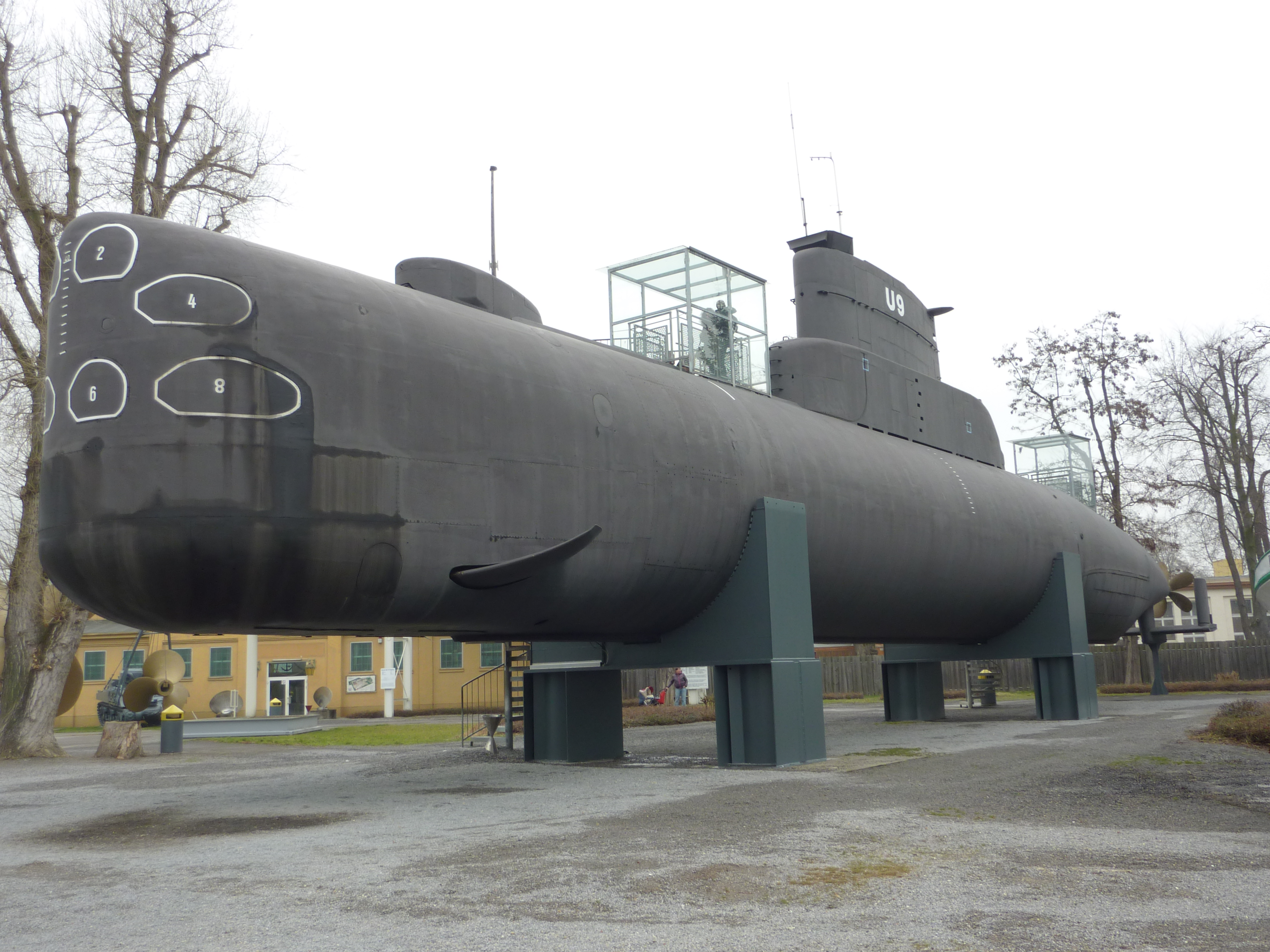
German submarine U-9 in Speyer

The Type 205 was in service with the Royal Danish Navy until 2004, in which it was known as Narhvalen class. The Danish boats differed slightly from the German ones to meet special Danish demands. Responsible for the design and construction was the Ingenieurkontor Lübeck (IKL) headed by Ulrich Gabler.

== List of boats ==
Submarines built for the Bundesmarine:
Pennant number	Name	Call sign	Launched	Com- missioned	Decom- missioned	Fate
S180	U-1		17 February 1967	26 June 1967	29 November 1991	scrapped
S181	U-2		15 July 1967	11 October 1966	19 March 1993	scrapped
S183	U-4		25 August 1962	19 November 1962	1 August 1974	scrapped
S184	U-5		20 November 1962	4 July 1963	17 May 1974	scrapped
S185	U-6		30 January 1963	24 July 1963	22 August 1974	scrapped
S186	U-7		10 April 1963	16 March 1964	12 July 1974	scrapped
S187	U-8		19 June 1963	22 July 1964	9 October 1974	scrapped
S188	U-9		20 October 1966	11 April 1967	3 June 1993	Museum ship, Technikmuseum Speyer
S189	U-10		5 June 1967	28 November 1967	16 February 1993	Museum ship, Wilhelmshaven
S190	U-11		9 February 1968	21 June 1968	30 October 2003	Museum ship, Burgstaaken, Fehmarn
S191	U-12		10 September 1968	14 January 1969	21 June 2005	scrapped
Submarines built for the Royal Danish Navy:
S320	Narhvalen		10 September 1968	27 February 1970	16 October 2003	scrapped
S321	Nordkaperen		18 December 1969	22 December 1970	2 February 2004	scrapped

These last two boats were built by the Howaldtswerke, in Denmark at The Naval Dockyard, Copenhagen.

Notes:

- U-1 was given back to Nordseewerke and was used to test an experimental closed-cycle diesel air-independent propulsion system before being scrapped
- U-11 was transformed to a Type 205A double-hulled boat (the outer hull filled with polystyrene foam to make it unsinkable) and used as torpedo target
- U-12 was used for sonar trials as Type 205B

== See also ==
Equivalent submarines of the same era

- Hajen class
- Aréthuse class
- Toti class
- Natsushio class
