= Sarmur =

Sarmur or Sar Mur or Sar Mowr (Persian: سرمور) may refer to:

- Sar Mur, Chaharmahal and Bakhtiari
- Sar Mur, Fars
- Sarmur, Ravar, Kerman Province
- Sar Mowr, Zarand, Kerman Province
- Sarmur, Khuzestan
- Sar Mur, Kohgiluyeh and Boyer-Ahmad
- Sar Mur-e Kukhdan, Kohgiluyeh and Boyer-Ahmad Province
