= Dashtuiyeh =

Dashtuiyeh or Dashtooeyeh or Dashtueeyeh (Persian: دشتوييه), sometimes shortened to Dashtu, may refer to:

- Dashtuiyeh, Hormozgan
- Dashtuiyeh, Fahraj, Kerman Province
- Dashtuiyeh, Ravar, Kerman Province
