= Gach (disambiguation) =

Gach is a village in Razavi Khorasan province, Iran.

Gach (Persian: گچ) may also refer to:

- Gach-e Olya, village in Kerman province, Iran
- Gach-e Sofla, village in Kerman province, Iran
- Gach Boland, village in Kohgiluyeh and Boyer-Ahmad province, Iran
- Gach (surname)
- GACH (Spanish: Grupo Asesor Científico Honorario, Uruguayan Honorary Scientific Advisory Group formed in response to the COVID-19 pandemic
