= Aliabad-e Yek, Ravar =

Aliabad-e Yek علي آباد1
- Village
- Location within Iran
- Coordinates: 30°48′41″N 56°28′56″E
- Country: Iran
- Province: Kerman
- County: Ravar
- Bakhsh: Central
- Rural District: Ravar

Population (2006)
  - Total: 19
- Time zone: UTC+3:30 (IRST)
  - Summer (DST): UTC+4:30 (IRDT)

Aliabad-e Yek (Persian: علي آباد1, also Romanized as ‘Alīābād-e Yek; also known as ‘Alīābād) is a village in Ravar Rural District, in the Central District of Ravar County, Kerman Province, Iran. At the 2006 census, its population was 19, in 7 families.
