= Qanat-e Seh =

Qanat-e Seh قنات سه
- Village
- Location within Iran
- Coordinates: 30°45′23″N 57°01′47″E
- Country: Iran
- Province: Kerman
- County: Ravar
- Bakhsh: Kuhsaran
- Rural District: Heruz

Population (2006)
  - Total: 109
- Time zone: UTC+3:30 (IRST)
  - Summer (DST): UTC+4:30 (IRDT)

Qanat-e Seh (Persian: قنات سه, also Romanized as Qanāt-e Seh) is a village in Heruz Rural District, Kuhsaran District, Ravar County, Kerman Province, Iran. At the 2006 census, its population was 109, in 33 families.
