= Gazk, Ravar =

Gazk گزك
- Village
- Location within Iran
- Coordinates: 30°39′41″N 57°16′11″E
- Country: Iran
- Province: Kerman
- County: Ravar
- Bakhsh: Kuhsaran
- Rural District: Horjand

Population (2006)
  - Total: 332
- Time zone: UTC+3:30 (IRST)
  - Summer (DST): UTC+4:30 (IRDT)

Gazk (Persian: گزك, also Romanized as Gazak; also known as Gaz and Kaz) is a village in Horjand Rural District, Kuhsaran District, Ravar County, Kerman Province, Iran. At the 2006 census, its population was 332, in 83 families.
