= Biduiyeh =

Biduiyeh or Biduyeh or Bidooyeh (Persian: بيدوييه or بيدويه) may refer to:

== Hormozgan Province ==
- Biduiyeh-ye Kajin, Hormozgan Province

== Kerman Province ==
- Biduiyeh, Jiroft
- Biduiyeh 1, Kerman County
- Biduiyeh, Ravar
- Biduiyeh, Dehaj, Shahr-e Babak County
