= Karimabad, Ravar =

Karimabad كريم آباد
- Village
- Location within Iran
- Coordinates: 30°41′14″N 57°04′19″E
- Country: Iran
- Province: Kerman
- County: Ravar
- Bakhsh: Kuhsaran
- Rural District: Horjand

Population (2006)
  - Total: 47
- Time zone: UTC+3:30 (IRST)
  - Summer (DST): UTC+4:30 (IRDT)

Karimabad (Persian: كریم آباد, also Romanized as Karīmābād) is a village in Horjand Rural District, Kuhsaran District, Ravar County, Kerman Province, Iran. At the 2006 census, its population was 47, in 13 families.
