= Qanat-e Garm =

Qanat-e Garm قنات گرم
- Village
- Location within Iran
- Coordinates: 30°41′23″N 57°01′09″E
- Country: Iran
- Province: Kerman
- County: Ravar
- Bakhsh: Kuhsaran
- Rural District: Heruz

Population (2006)
  - Total: 216
- Time zone: UTC+3:30 (IRST)
  - Summer (DST): UTC+4:30 (IRDT)

Qanat-e Garm (Persian: قنات گرم, also Romanized as Qanāt-e Garm) is a village in Heruz Rural District, Kuhsaran District, Ravar County, Kerman Province, Iran. At the 2006 census, its population was 216, in 61 families.
