= Qanat-e Saleh =

Qanat-e Saleh قنات صالح
- Village
- Location within Iran
- Coordinates: 30°40′00″N 57°08′00″E
- Country: Iran
- Province: Kerman
- County: Ravar
- Bakhsh: Kuhsaran
- Rural District: Horjand

Population (2006)
  - Total: 17
- Time zone: UTC+3:30 (IRST)
  - Summer (DST): UTC+4:30 (IRDT)

Qanat-e Saleh (Persian: قنات صالح, also Romanized as Qanāt-e Şāleḩ) is a village in Horjand Rural District, Kuhsaran District, Ravar County, Kerman Province, Iran. At the 2006 census, its population was 17, in 4 families.
