= Darb-e Hezar =

Darb-e Hezar درب هزار
- Village
- Location within Iran
- Coordinates: 30°37′41″N 57°11′25″E
- Country: Iran
- Province: Kerman
- County: Ravar
- Bakhsh: Kuhsaran
- Rural District: Horjand

Population (2006)
  - Total: 45
- Time zone: UTC+3:30 (IRST)
  - Summer (DST): UTC+4:30 (IRDT)

Darb-e Hezar (Persian: درب هزار, also Romanized as Darb-e Hezār and Darbhezār) is a village in Horjand Rural District, Kuhsaran District, Ravar County, Kerman Province, Iran. At the 2006 census, its population was 45, in 10 families.
