= Badamuiyeh, Ravar =

Badamuiyeh باداموييه
- Village
- Location within Iran
- Coordinates: 30°40′59″N 57°04′13″E
- Country: Iran
- Province: Kerman
- County: Ravar
- Bakhsh: Kuhsaran
- Rural District: Horjand

Population (2006)
  - Total: 189
- Time zone: UTC+3:30 (IRST)
  - Summer (DST): UTC+4:30 (IRDT)

Badamuiyeh (Persian: باداموييه, also Romanized as Bādāmū’īyeh; also known as Badāmān) is a village in Horjand Rural District, Kuhsaran District, Ravar County, Kerman Province, Iran. At the 2006 census, its population was 189, in 51 families.
