= Deh-e Shib, Ravar =

Deh-e Shib ده شيب
- Village
- Location within Iran
- Coordinates: 31°16′29″N 56°49′52″E
- Country: Iran
- Province: Kerman
- County: Ravar
- Bakhsh: Central
- Rural District: Ravar

Population (2006)
  - Total: 187
- Time zone: UTC+3:30 (IRST)
  - Summer (DST): UTC+4:30 (IRDT)

Deh-e Shib (Persian: ده شيب, also Romanized as Deh-e Shīb and Deh Shīb; also known as Deh Shīr and Deh Sho’eyb) is a village in Ravar Rural District, in the Central District of Ravar County, Kerman Province, Iran. At the 2006 census, its population was 187, in 49 families.
