= Khodadad, Kerman =

Khodadad خداداد
- Village
- Location within Iran
- Coordinates: 30°42′00″N 57°10′00″E
- Country: Iran
- Province: Kerman
- County: Ravar
- Bakhsh: Kuhsaran
- Rural District: Horjand

Population (2006)
  - Total: 18
- Time zone: UTC+3:30 (IRST)
  - Summer (DST): UTC+4:30 (IRDT)

Khodadad (Persian: خداداد, also Romanized as Khodādād) is a village in Horjand Rural District, Kuhsaran District, Ravar County, Kerman Province, Iran. At the 2006 census, its population was 18, in 5 families.
