= Deh-e Now-ye Ali Shahri =

Deh-e Now-ye Ali Shahri دهنوعلي شهري
- Village
- Location within Iran
- Coordinates: 30°42′34″N 57°03′20″E
- Country: Iran
- Province: Kerman
- County: Ravar
- Bakhsh: Kuhsaran
- Rural District: Horjand

Population (2006)
  - Total: 62
- Time zone: UTC+3:30 (IRST)
  - Summer (DST): UTC+4:30 (IRDT)

Deh-e Now-ye Ali Shahri (Persian: دهنوعلي شهري, also Romanized as Deh-e Now-ye ‘Alī Shahrī) is a village in Horjand Rural District, Kuhsaran District, Ravar County, Kerman Province, Iran. At the 2006 census, its population was 62, in 17 families.
