= Gurak-e Do =

Gurak گورك 2
- Village
- Location within Iran
- Coordinates: 30°43′28″N 57°09′34″E
- Country: Iran
- Province: Kerman
- County: Ravar
- Bakhsh: Kuhsaran
- Rural District: Horjand

Population (2006)
  - Total: 311
- Time zone: UTC+3:30 (IRST)
  - Summer (DST): UTC+4:30 (IRDT)

Gurak (Persian: گورك 2, also Romanized as Gūrak-e Do; also known as Goorag, Govark, Gūrak, Gvark, and Kavark) is a village in Horjand Rural District, Kuhsaran District, Ravar County, Kerman Province, Iran. At the 2006 census, its population was 311, in 79 families.
