= Genuiyeh =

Genuiyeh or Ganuiyeh or Gonuiyeh or Gonaviyeh (Persian: گنوييه) may refer to:

- Gonuiyeh, Isfahan
- Genuiyeh, Kiskan, Baft County, Kerman Province
- Gonuiyeh, Ravar, Kerman Province
