= Barim =

Barim بريم
- Village
- Location within Iran
- Coordinates: 30°49′15″N 56°57′54″E
- Country: Iran
- Province: Kerman
- County: Ravar
- Bakhsh: Kuhsaran
- Rural District: Heruz

Population (2006)
  - Total: 59
- Time zone: UTC+3:30 (IRST)
  - Summer (DST): UTC+4:30 (IRDT)

Barim (Persian: بريم, also Romanized as Barīm and Borīm; also known as Barīm-e Nakha‘ī, Barim Nakha’ī, Beyram, and Beyrīm) is a village in Heruz Rural District, Kuhsaran District, Ravar County, Kerman Province, Iran. At the 2006 census, its population was 59, in 13 families.
