= Heykuiyeh =

Heykuiyeh هيكوئيه
- Village
- Location within Iran
- Coordinates: 30°39′55″N 57°05′54″E
- Country: Iran
- Province: Kerman
- County: Ravar
- Bakhsh: Kuhsaran
- Rural District: Horjand

Population (2006)
  - Total: 122
- Time zone: UTC+3:30 (IRST)
  - Summer (DST): UTC+4:30 (IRDT)

Heykuiyeh (Persian: هيكوئيه, also Romanized as Heykū’īyeh; also known as Heykūeeyeh) is a village in Horjand Rural District, Kuhsaran District, Ravar County, Kerman Province, Iran. At the 2006 census, its population was 122, in 34 families.
