= Kahn-e Qazi =

Kahn-e Qazi كهن قاضي
- Village
- Location within Iran
- Coordinates: 30°42′03″N 57°03′53″E
- Country: Iran
- Province: Kerman
- County: Ravar
- Bakhsh: Kuhsaran
- Rural District: Horjand

Population (2006)
  - Total: 163
- Time zone: UTC+3:30 (IRST)
  - Summer (DST): UTC+4:30 (IRDT)

Kahn-e Qazi (Persian: كهن قاضي, also Romanized as Kahn-e Qāẕī and Kahn-e Qāzī; also known as Kahn-e Qāzt, Kohneh Qāẕat, and Qanāt-e Qāẕī) is a village in Horjand Rural District, Kuhsaran District, Ravar County, Kerman Province, Iran. At the 2006 census, its population was 163, in 41 families.
