= Deymeskan =

Deymeskan ديمسكان
- Village
- Location within Iran
- Coordinates: 31°20′58″N 56°29′55″E
- Country: Iran
- Province: Kerman
- County: Ravar
- Bakhsh: Central
- Rural District: Ravar
- Elevation: 2,068 m (6,785 ft)

Population (2006)
  - Total: 180
- Time zone: UTC+3:30 (IRST)
  - Summer (DST): UTC+4:30 (IRDT)

Deymeskan (Persian: ديمسكان, also Romanized as Deymeskān and Dīmeskān) is a village in Ravar Rural District, in the Central District of Ravar County, Kerman Province, Iran. At the 2006 census, its population was 180, in 56 families.
