= Dar Shur Ab-e Pain =

Dar Shur Ab-e Pain درشوراب پائين
- Village
- Location within Iran
- Coordinates: 31°21′00″N 56°30′00″E
- Country: Iran
- Province: Kerman
- County: Ravar
- Bakhsh: Central
- Rural District: Ravar

Population (2006)
  - Total: 24
- Time zone: UTC+3:30 (IRST)
  - Summer (DST): UTC+4:30 (IRDT)

Dar Shur Ab-e Pain (Persian: درشوراب پائين, also Romanized as Dar Shūr Āb-e Pā’īn; also known as Darshūr-e Pā’īn) is a village in Ravar Rural District, in the Central District of Ravar County, Kerman province, Iran. At the 2006 census, its population was 24, in 7 families.
