= Dehuj =

Dehuj (Persian: دهوج) may refer to:

- Dehuj, Baft
- Dehuj, Jiroft
- Dehuj, Ravar
