= Sineh Kuiyeh =

Sineh Kuiyeh سينه كوييه
- Village
- Location within Iran
- Coordinates: 31°20′00″N 56°30′00″E
- Country: Iran
- Province: Kerman
- County: Ravar
- Bakhsh: Central
- Rural District: Ravar

Population (2006)
  - Total: 98
- Time zone: UTC+3:30 (IRST)
  - Summer (DST): UTC+4:30 (IRDT)

Sineh Kuiyeh (Persian: سينه كوييه, also Romanized as Sīneh Kū’īyeh; also known as Sīneh Kūh) is a village in Ravar Rural District, in the Central District of Ravar County, Kerman Province, Iran. At the 2006 census, its population was 98, in 22 families.
