= Kanguiyeh =

Kanguiyeh كنگوييه
- Village
- Location within Iran
- Coordinates: 31°01′00″N 56°42′00″E
- Country: Iran
- Province: Kerman
- County: Ravar
- Bakhsh: Central
- Rural District: Ravar

Population (2006)
  - Total: 11
- Time zone: UTC+3:30 (IRST)
  - Summer (DST): UTC+4:30 (IRDT)

Kanguiyeh (Persian: كنگوييه, also Romanized as Kangū’īyeh; also known as Kankū’īyeh and Kenu) is a village in Ravar Rural District, in the Central District of Ravar County, Kerman Province, Iran. At the 2006 census, its population was 11, in 5 families.
