= Kharkuiyeh =

Kharkuiyeh خاركوييه
- Village
- Location within Iran
- Coordinates: 30°40′47″N 57°04′32″E
- Country: Iran
- Province: Kerman
- County: Ravar
- Bakhsh: Kuhsaran
- Rural District: Horjand

Population (2006)
  - Total: 138
- Time zone: UTC+3:30 (IRST)
  - Summer (DST): UTC+4:30 (IRDT)

Kharkuiyeh (Persian: خاركوييه, also Romanized as Khārkū’īyeh; also known as Khārkū and Khārkūn) is a village in Horjand Rural District, Kuhsaran District, Ravar County, Kerman Province, Iran. At the 2006 census, its population was 138, in 39 families.
