= Deh-e Zanan =

Deh-e Zanan ده زنان
- Village
- Location within Iran
- Coordinates: 30°45′43″N 57°01′20″E
- Country: Iran
- Province: Kerman
- County: Ravar
- Bakhsh: Kuhsaran
- Rural District: Heruz

Population (2006)
  - Total: 184
- Time zone: UTC+3:30 (IRST)
  - Summer (DST): UTC+4:30 (IRDT)

Deh-e Zanan (Persian: ده زنان, also Romanized as Deh-e Zanān and Deh Zanān; also known as Deh Zamān, Deh Zanān-e Gīpūm, and Kalāt-i-Deh Zanūn) is a village in Heruz Rural District, Kuhsaran District, Ravar County, Kerman Province, Iran. At the 2006 census, its population was 184, in 48 families.
