= Hargondi =

Hargondi هرگندي
- Village
- Location within Iran
- Coordinates: 30°47′24″N 56°59′01″E
- Country: Iran
- Province: Kerman
- County: Ravar
- Bakhsh: Kuhsaran
- Rural District: Heruz

Population (2006)
  - Total: 64
- Time zone: UTC+3:30 (IRST)
  - Summer (DST): UTC+4:30 (IRDT)

Hargondi (Persian: هرگندي, also Romanized as Hargondī) is a village in Heruz Rural District, Kuhsaran District, Ravar County, Kerman Province, Iran. At the 2006 census, its population was 64, in 15 families.
