= Khvod Rahi =

Khvod Rahi خودراهي
- Village
- Location within Iran
- Coordinates: 31°32′00″N 56°30′00″E
- Country: Iran
- Province: Kerman
- County: Ravar
- Bakhsh: Central
- Rural District: Ravar

Population (2006)
  - Total: 81
- Time zone: UTC+3:30 (IRST)
  - Summer (DST): UTC+4:30 (IRDT)

Khvod Rahi (Persian: خودراهي, also Romanized as Khvod Rāhī and Khowd Rāhī; also known as Khod Rāhī) is a village in Ravar Rural District, in the Central District of Ravar County, Kerman Province, Iran. At the 2006 census, its population was 81, in 23 families.
