= Shamshirabad =

Shamshirabad شمشيراباد
- Village
- Location within Iran
- Coordinates: 31°36′54″N 56°34′22″E
- Country: Iran
- Province: Kerman
- County: Ravar
- Bakhsh: Central
- Rural District: Ravar

Population (2006)
  - Total: 28
- Time zone: UTC+3:30 (IRST)
  - Summer (DST): UTC+4:30 (IRDT)

Shamshirabad (Persian: شمشيراباد, also Romanized as Shamshīrābād) is a village in Ravar Rural District, in the Central District of Ravar County, Kerman Province, Iran. At the 2006 census, its population was 28, in 7 families.
