= Chenaruiyeh, Ravar =

Chenaruiyeh چناروييه
- Village
- Location within Iran
- Coordinates: 30°41′37″N 57°04′34″E
- Country: Iran
- Province: Kerman
- County: Ravar
- Bakhsh: Kuhsaran
- Rural District: Horjand

Population (2006)
  - Total: 43
- Time zone: UTC+3:30 (IRST)
  - Summer (DST): UTC+4:30 (IRDT)

Chenaruiyeh (Persian: چناروييه, also Romanized as Chenārū’īyeh and Chenārrū’īyeh) is a village in Horjand Rural District, Kuhsaran District, Ravar County, Kerman province, Iran. At the 2006 census, its population was 43, in 11 families.
