= Baghijan =

Baghijan بغيجان
- Village
- Location within Iran
- Coordinates: 31°05′35″N 56°42′02″E
- Country: Iran
- Province: Kerman
- County: Ravar
- Bakhsh: Central
- Rural District: Ravar

Population (2006)
  - Total: 160
- Time zone: UTC+3:30 (IRST)
  - Summer (DST): UTC+4:30 (IRDT)

Baghijan (Persian: بغيجان, also Romanized as Baghījān, Baghi Jan, and Begheyjān; also known as Baqījān and Begaijān) is a village in Ravar Rural District, in the Central District of Ravar County, Kerman Province, Iran. At the 2006 census, its population was 160, in 55 families.
