= Dahaneh Tangal =

Dahaneh Tangal دهنه تنگل
- Village
- Location within Iran
- Coordinates: 30°48′39″N 57°03′29″E
- Country: Iran
- Province: Kerman
- County: Ravar
- Bakhsh: Kuhsaran
- Rural District: Heruz

Population (2006)
  - Total: 27
- Time zone: UTC+3:30 (IRST)
  - Summer (DST): UTC+4:30 (IRDT)

Dahaneh Tangal (Persian: دهنه تنگل; also known as Dahaneh Tangal-e Āb Garm and Darb-e Tangal) is a village in Heruz Rural District, Kuhsaran District, Ravar County, Kerman Province, Iran. At the 2006 census, its population was 27, in 7 families.
