= Sodkuiyeh =

Village in Kerman, Iran

Sodkuiyeh سدکوئيه
- Village
- Location within Iran
- Coordinates: 30°38′47″N 57°07′47″E
- Country: Iran
- Province: Kerman
- County: Ravar
- Bakhsh: Kuhsaran
- Rural District: Horjand

Population (2006)
  - Total: 11
- Time zone: UTC+3:30 (IRST)
  - Summer (DST): UTC+4:30 (IRDT)

Sodkuiyeh (Persian: سدکوئيه, also romanized as Sodkū’īyeh; also known as Sotkūeeyeh) is a village in Horjand Rural District, Kuhsaran District, Ravar County, Kerman Province, Iran. At the 2006 census, its population was 11, in 4 families.
