= Tashk, Kerman =

Tashk تاشك
- Village
- Location within Iran
- Coordinates: 31°05′40″N 56°38′57″E
- Country: Iran
- Province: Kerman
- County: Ravar
- Bakhsh: Central
- Rural District: Ravar

Population (2006)
  - Total: 228
- Time zone: UTC+3:30 (IRST)
  - Summer (DST): UTC+4:30 (IRDT)

Tashk (Persian: تاشك, also romanized as Tāshk and Ţāshk) is a village in Ravar Rural District, in the Central District of Ravar County, Kerman Province, Iran. At the 2006 census, its population was 228, in 79 families.
