= Sar Ashk =

Sar Ashk سراشك
- Village
- Location within Iran
- Coordinates: 30°49′28″N 57°02′22″E
- Country: Iran
- Province: Kerman
- County: Ravar
- Bakhsh: Kuhsaran
- Rural District: Heruz

Population (2006)
  - Total: 27
- Time zone: UTC+3:30 (IRST)
  - Summer (DST): UTC+4:30 (IRDT)

Sar Ashk (Persian: سراشك; also known as Sar ‘Arsh) is a village in Heruz Rural District, Kuhsaran District, Ravar County, Kerman Province, Iran. At the 2006 census, its population was 27, in 8 families.
