= Qanat-e Kohan-e Deh Shoyib =

Qanat-e Kohan-e Deh Shoyib قنات كهن ده شعيب
- Village
- Location within Iran
- Coordinates: 30°46′07″N 56°57′03″E
- Country: Iran
- Province: Kerman
- County: Ravar
- Bakhsh: Kuhsaran
- Rural District: Heruz

Population (2006)
  - Total: 46
- Time zone: UTC+3:30 (IRST)
  - Summer (DST): UTC+4:30 (IRDT)

Qanat-e Kohan-e Deh Shoyib (Persian: قنات كهن ده شعيب, also Romanized as Qanāt-e Kohan-e Deh Shoʿyīb; also known as Qanāt-e Kohan-e Shoaybdeh) is a village in Heruz Rural District, Kuhsaran District, Ravar County, Kerman Province, Iran. At the 2006 census, its population was 46, in 14 families.
