= Huru =

Huru may refer to:

- Hiurud, an Iranian village also known as Hūrū
- Chronicle of Huru, forged 19th century text about Romanian history in Moldavia
- Mbira huru, African wood and metal key instrument, similar to a marimba
- Dickson Huru (born 1990), Ugandan cross country runner
- Izaak Huru Doko (1913-1985), Indonesian politician and National Hero of Indonesia
- Petri Huru, Finnish politician

== See also ==
- Hurus (disambiguation)
