= Sohrang =

Sohrang سهرنگ
- Village
- Location within Iran
- Coordinates: 30°48′53″N 57°02′15″E
- Country: Iran
- Province: Kerman
- County: Ravar
- Bakhsh: Kuhsaran
- Rural District: Heruz

Population (2006)
  - Total: 41
- Time zone: UTC+3:30 (IRST)
  - Summer (DST): UTC+4:30 (IRDT)

Sohrang (Persian: سهرنگ; also known as 'Sāreng and Sorāng) is a village in Heruz Rural District, Kuhsaran District, Ravar County, Kerman Province, Iran. At the 2006 census, its population was 41, in 13 families.
