= Shahzadeh Mohammad, Kerman =

Shahzadeh Mohammad شاهزاده محمد
- Village
- Location within Iran
- Coordinates: 30°48′21″N 56°55′34″E
- Country: Iran
- Province: Kerman
- County: Ravar
- Bakhsh: Kuhsaran
- Rural District: Heruz

Population (2006)
  - Total: 247
- Time zone: UTC+3:30 (IRST)
  - Summer (DST): UTC+4:30 (IRDT)

Shahzadeh Mohammad (Persian: شاهزاده محمد, also Romanized as Shāhzādeh Moḩammad) is a village in Heruz Rural District, Kuhsaran District, Ravar County, Kerman Province, Iran. At the 2006 census, its population was 247, in 71 families.
