= Heruz-e Olya =

Heruz-e Olya هروزعليا
- Village
- Location within Iran
- Coordinates: 30°43′38″N 57°02′52″E
- Country: Iran
- Province: Kerman
- County: Ravar
- Bakhsh: Kuhsaran
- Rural District: Heruz

Population (2006)
  - Total: 270
- Time zone: UTC+3:30 (IRST)
  - Summer (DST): UTC+4:30 (IRDT)

Heruz-e Olya (Persian: هروزعليا, also Romanized as Herūz-e ‘Olyā, Harūz-e ‘Olyā, and Haroozé Olya; also known as Harūz-e Bālā, Herūz Bālā, Herūz-e Bālā, Hurūs Bāla, and Hurūz Bāla) is a village in Heruz Rural District, Kuhsaran District, Ravar County, Kerman Province, Iran. At the 2006 census, its population was 270, in 73 families.
