= Garik =

Garik may refer to:

== People ==
- Garik Israelian (b. 1963), Armenian-Spanish astronomer
- Garik Martirosyan (b. 1974), Armenian entertainer
- Garik Samanba (b. 1957), Abkhaz politician
- Garik Sukachov (b. 1959), Russian poet and musician
- Garik Kimovich Weinstein (b. 1963), birth name of Russian chess master Garry Kasparov
- Garik Seko, a Georgian born Czech animator who worked in Jiří Trnka Studio

== Places ==
- Garik, Kerman, a village in Kerman Province, Iran
- Garik, Shahr-e Babak, a village in Kerman Province, Iran
- Garik, West Azerbaijan, a village in West Azerbaijan Province, Iran
