= Roqeh-ye Soghirah =

Roqeh-ye Soghirah رقعه صغيره
- Village
- Location within Iran
- Coordinates: 30°41′13″N 57°00′47″E
- Country: Iran
- Province: Kerman
- County: Ravar
- Bakhsh: Kuhsaran
- Rural District: Heruz

Population (2006)
  - Total: 47
- Time zone: UTC+3:30 (IRST)
  - Summer (DST): UTC+4:30 (IRDT)

Roqeh-ye Soghirah (Persian: رقعه صغيره, also Romanized as Roq‘eh-ye Şoghīrah; also known as Roq‘eh and Roq‘eh-ye Şoghrá) is a village in Heruz Rural District, Kuhsaran District, Ravar County, Kerman Province, Iran. At the 2006 census, its population was 47, in 13 families.
