= Dashtuiyeh, Ravar =

Dashtuiyeh دشتوئيه
- Village
- Location within Iran
- Coordinates: 30°39′55″N 57°13′15″E
- Country: Iran
- Province: Kerman
- County: Ravar
- Bakhsh: Kuhsaran
- Rural District: Horjand

Population (2006)
  - Total: 27
- Time zone: UTC+3:30 (IRST)
  - Summer (DST): UTC+4:30 (IRDT)

Dashtuiyeh (Persian: دشتوئيه, also Romanized as Dashtū’īyeh and Dashtūeeyeh) is a village in Horjand Rural District, Kuhsaran District, Ravar County, Kerman Province, Iran. At the 2006 census, its population was 27, in 6 families.
