= Gach-e Sofla =

Gach-e Sofla گچ سفلي
- Village
- Location within Iran
- Coordinates: 30°41′15″N 57°05′11″E
- Country: Iran
- Province: Kerman
- County: Ravar
- Bakhsh: Kuhsaran
- Rural District: Horjand

Population (2006)
  - Total: 86
- Time zone: UTC+3:30 (IRST)
  - Summer (DST): UTC+4:30 (IRDT)

Gach-e Sofla (Persian: گچ سفلي, also Romanized as Gach-e Soflá and Gach Soflá; also known as Gach-e Pā’īn) is a village in Horjand Rural District, Kuhsaran District, Ravar County, Kerman Province, Iran. At the 2006 census, its population was 86, in 23 families.
