= Horjand =

Village in Kerman province, Iran

Horjand Persian: حرجند
- Village
- Location within Iran
- Coordinates: 30°40′35″N 57°09′18″E
- Country: Iran
- Province: Kerman
- County: Ravar
- District: Kuhsaran
- Rural District: Horjand

Population (2016)
  - Total: 784
- Time zone: UTC+3:30 (IRST)

Horjand (Persian: حرجند) (Note: Also romanized as Ḩorjand and Ḩorjond; also known as Hūrjand) is a village in, and the capital of, Horjand Rural District of Kuhsaran District, Ravar County, Kerman province, Iran.

== Demographics ==
=== Population ===
At the time of the 2006 National Census, the village's population was 499 in 131 households. The following census in 2011 counted 529 people in 162 households. The 2016 census measured the population of the village as 784 people in 244 households. It was the most populous village in its rural district.
