= Sarmur, Ravar =

Sarmur سرمور
- Village
- Location within Iran
- Coordinates: 31°21′00″N 56°30′00″E
- Country: Iran
- Province: Kerman
- County: Ravar
- Bakhsh: Central
- Rural District: Ravar

Population (2006)
  - Total: 14
- Time zone: UTC+3:30 (IRST)
  - Summer (DST): UTC+4:30 (IRDT)

Sarmur (Persian: سرمور, also Romanized as Sarmūr) is a village in Ravar Rural District, in the Central District of Ravar County, Kerman Province, Iran. At the 2006 census, its population was 14, in 5 families.
