= Roqeh-ye Kabir =

Roqeh-ye Kabir رقعه كبير
- Village
- Location within Iran
- Coordinates: 30°40′48″N 57°09′10″E
- Country: Iran
- Province: Kerman
- County: Ravar
- Bakhsh: Kuhsaran
- Rural District: Horjand

Population (2006)
  - Total: 76
- Time zone: UTC+3:30 (IRST)
  - Summer (DST): UTC+4:30 (IRDT)

Roqeh-ye Kabir (Persian: رقعه كبير, also Romanized as Roq‘eh-ye Kabīr; also known as Roq‘eh) is a village in Horjand Rural District, Kuhsaran District, Ravar County, Kerman Province, Iran. At the 2006 census, its population was 76, in 21 families.
