= Gonuiyeh, Ravar =

Gonuiyeh گنوئيه
- Village
- Location within Iran
- Coordinates: 30°45′50″N 56°54′48″E
- Country: Iran
- Province: Kerman
- County: Ravar
- Bakhsh: Kuhsaran
- Rural District: Heruz

Population (2006)
  - Total: 216
- Time zone: UTC+3:30 (IRST)
  - Summer (DST): UTC+4:30 (IRDT)

Gonuiyeh (Persian: گنوئيه, also Romanized as Gonū’īyeh) is a village in Heruz Rural District, Kuhsaran District, Ravar County, Kerman Province, Iran. At the 2006 census, its population was 216, in 46 families.
