= Khan (title) =

Historical title for a ruler or military leader

Khan (Note: Mongolian: хан, ᠬᠠᠨ, khan/qan; Chinese: 汗 hán; Goguryeo: 皆 key; Buyeo: 加 ka; Silla: 干 kan; Gaya: 旱 kan; Baekje: 瑕 ke; Manchu: ᡥᠠᠨ, han; Old Turkic: 𐰴𐰣 kan; Turkish: han; Azerbaijani: xan; Bulgarian: хан, han; Chuvash: хун, hun; Arabic: خان, k͟hān; Persian: خان, xân; Kurdish: خان, xân; Balochi: خان, xàn; Punjabi: خان, ਖ਼ਾਨ/ਖ਼ਾਂ, k͟hān/k͟hã̄; Hindustani: ख़ान/ख़ाँ, خان/خاں, k͟hān/k͟hã̄; Bengali: খান/খাঁ, khān/khã̄) (/xɑːn/, /kɑːn/, /kæn/) is a historic Turkic and Mongolic title originating among nomadic tribes in the Central and Eastern Eurasian Steppe to refer to a king. It first appears among the Rouran and then the Göktürks as a variant of khagan (sovereign, emperor) (Note: Khagan itself was borrowed by the Turks from the unclassified Rouran language.) and implied a subordinate ruler. In the Seljuk Empire, it was the highest noble title, ranking above malik (king) and emir (prince). In the Mongol Empire, it signified the ruler of a horde (ulus), while the ruler of all the Mongols was the khagan or great khan. It is a title commonly used to signify the head of a Pashtun tribe or clan.

The title subsequently declined in importance. During the Safavid and Qajar dynasty it was the title of an army general high noble rank who was ruling a province, and in Mughal India it was a high noble rank restricted to courtiers. In the aftermath of the fall of the Mughal dynasty, it had been adopted promiscuously as a surname. Khan and its female forms occur in many personal names, generally without any nobiliary of political relevance, although it remains a common part of noble names as well.

== Etymology ==
The origin of the term is disputed and unknown, possibly a loanword from the Rouran language. A Turkic and Para-Mongolic origin has been suggested by a number of scholars including Ramstedt, Shiratori, Sinor and Doerfer, and was reportedly first used by the Xianbei.

Dybo (2007) suggests that the ultimate etymological root of Khagan/Khan comes from the Middle Iranian *hva-kama- 'self-ruler, emperor', following the view of Benveniste 1966. Savelyev and Jeong 2020 note that both the etymological root for Khagan/Khan and its female equivalent "khatun" may be derived from Eastern Iranian languages, specifically from "Early Saka *hvatuñ, cf. the attested Soghdian words xwt'w 'ruler' (< *hva-tāvya-) and xwt'yn 'wife of the ruler' (< *hva-tāvyani)".

== History ==
"Khan" is first encountered as a title in the Xianbei confederation for their chief between 283 and 289. The Rourans may have been the first people who used the titles khagan and khan for their emperors. However, Russian linguist Alexander Vovin (2007) believes that the term qaγan originated among the Xiongnu people, who were Yeniseian-speaking (according to Vovin), and then it diffused across language families. Subsequently, the Göktürks adopted the title and brought it to the rest of Asia. In the middle of the sixth century the Iranians knew of a "Kagan – King of the Turks".

Various Mongolic and Turkic peoples from Central Asia gave the title new prominence after period of the Mongol Empire (1206–1368) in the Old World and later brought the title "khan" into Northern Asia, where locals later adopted it. Khagan is rendered as Khan of Khans. It was the title of Chinese Emperor Emperor Taizong of Tang (Heavenly Khagan, reigned 626 to 649) and Genghis Khan's successors selected to rule the Mongol Empire starting from 1229. Genghis Khan himself was referred as qa'an (khagan) only posthumously. For instance Möngke Khan (reigned 1251–1259) and Ogedei Khan (reigned 1229–1241) would be "Khagans" but not Chagatai Khan, who was not proclaimed ruler of the Mongol Empire by the Kurultai.

== Khanate rulers and dynasties ==
=== Ruling khans ===
Originally khans headed only relatively minor tribal entities, generally in or near the vast Mongolian and North Chinese steppe, the scene of an almost endless procession of nomadic people riding out into the history of the neighbouring sedentary regions. Some managed to establish principalities of some importance for a while, as their military might repeatedly proved a serious threat to empires in the Central Plain and Central Asia.

One of the earliest notable examples of such principalities in Europe was Danube Bulgaria (presumably also Old Great Bulgaria), ruled by a khan or a kan at least from the 7th to the 9th century. The title "khan" is not attested directly in inscriptions and texts referring to Bulgar rulers – the only similar title found so far, Kanasubigi, has been found solely in the inscriptions of three consecutive Bulgarian rulers, namely Krum, Omurtag and Malamir (a grandfather, son and grandson). Starting from the compound, non-ruler titles that were attested among Bulgarian noble class such as kavkhan (vicekhan), tarkhan, and boritarkhan, scholars derive the title khan or kan for the early Bulgarian leader – if there was a vicekhan (kavkhan) there was probably a "full" khan, too. Compare also the rendition of the name of early Bulgarian ruler Pagan as Καμπαγάνος (Kampaganos), likely resulting from a misinterpretation of "Kan Pagan", in Patriarch Nicephorus's so-called Breviarium. In general, however, the inscriptions as well as other sources designate the supreme ruler of Danube Bulgaria with titles that exist in the language in which they are written – archontes, meaning 'commander or magistrate' in Greek, and knyaz, meaning "duke" or "prince" in Slavic. Among the best known Bulgar khans were: Khan Kubrat, founder of Great Bulgaria; Khan Asparukh, founder of Danubian Bulgaria (today's Bulgaria); Khan Tervel, who defeated the Arab invaders in 718 Siege of Constantinople (718), thus stopped the Arab invasion in Southeast Europe; Khan Krum, "the Fearsome". "Khan" was the official title of the ruler until 864 AD, when Knyaz Boris (known also as Tsar Boris I) adopted the Eastern Orthodox faith.

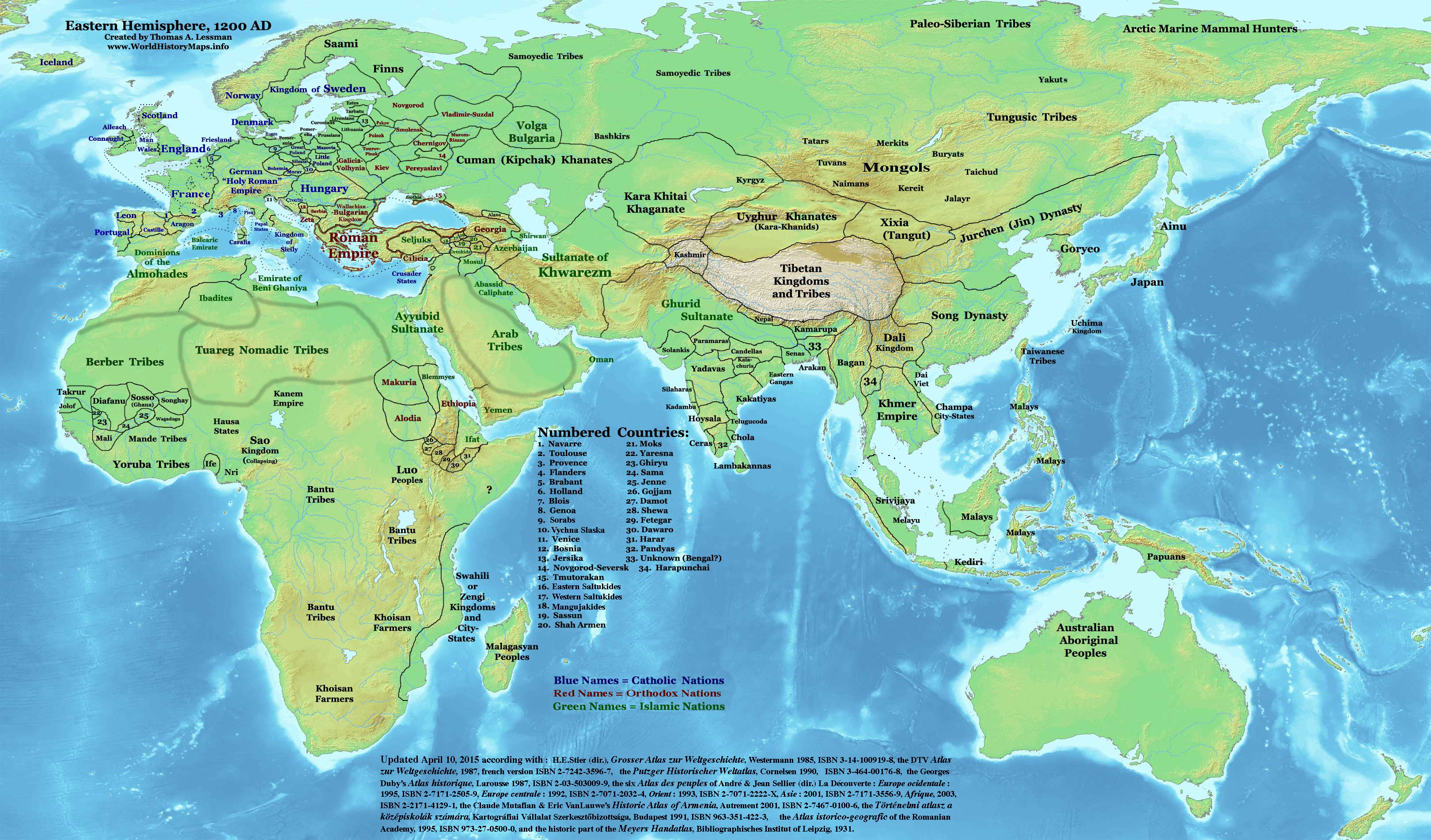
Eurasia on the eve of the Mongol invasions, c. 1200 AD

The title Khan rose to unprecedented prominence with the Mongol Temüjin's creation of the Mongol empire, the largest contiguous empire in history, which he ruled as Genghis Khan. Before 1229 the title was used to designate leaders of important tribes as well as tribal confederations (the Mongol Empire considered the largest one), and rulers of non-Mongol countries. Shortly before the death of the Genghis Khan, his sons became khans in different dominions (ulus) and the title apparently became unsuitable for the supreme ruler of the empire, needing a more exalted one. Being under Uighur cultural influence, Mongols adopted the title of khagan starting with Ögedei Khan in 1229.

Emperors of the Ming dynasty also used the term Xan to denote brave warriors and rulers. The title Khan was used to designate the greatest rulers of the Jurchens, who, later when known as the Manchus, founded the Qing dynasty.

Once more, there would be numerous khanates in the steppe in and around Central Asia, often more of a people than a territorial state, e.g.:

- in present Kazakhstan, of the Kazakhs (founded 1465; since 1601 divided into three geographical Jüz or Hordes, each under a mirza, bey, or subordinate khan); it was briefly united by rulers like Abu'l-Khair Muhammed and Tauke Muhammed, but after 1748 it split into three different khanates again; it was eliminated by the Russian Empire in 1847.
- in present Kyrgyzstan, the Kara-Kyrgyz Khanate was established by Ormon Khan in 1842, collapsing after his death in 1854.
- in present Uzbekistan, the main khanate, named after its capital Bukhara, was founded in 1500 and restyled emirate in 1753 (after three Persian governors since 1747); the Ferghana (valley's) khanate broke way from it by 1694 and became known as the Khanate of Kokand after its capital Kokand from its establishment in 1732; the khanate of Khwarezm, dating from c.1500, became the Khanate of Khiva in 1804 but fell soon under Russian protectorate; Karakalpakstan had its own rulers (khans?) since c. 1600.

While most Afghan principalities were styled emirate, there was a khanate of ethnic Uzbeks in Badakhshan since 1697.

Khan was also the title of the rulers of various break-away states and principalities later in Persia, e.g. 1747–1808 Khanate of Ardabil (in northwestern Iran east of Sarab and west of the southwest corner of the Caspian Sea-Mazandaran and Gorgan provinces), 1747–1813 Khanate of Khoy (northwestern Iran, north of Lake Urmia, between Tabriz and Lake Van), 1747–1829 Khanate of Maku (in extreme northwestern Iran, northwest of Khoy, and 60 miles south of Yerevan, Armenia), 1747–1790s Khanate of Sarab (northwestern Iran east of Tabriz), 1747 – c.1800 Khanate of Tabriz (capital of Iranian Azerbaijan).

There were various small khanates in and near Transcaucasia and Ciscaucasia established by the Safavids, or their successive Afsharid and Qajar dynasties outside their territories of Persia proper. For example, in present Armenia and nearby territories to the left and right, there was the khanate of Erivan (sole incumbent 1807–1827 Hosein Quli Khan Qajar). Diverse khanates existed in Dagestan (now part of Russia), Azerbaijan, including Baku (present capital), Ganja, Jawad, Quba (Kuba), Salyan, Shakki (Sheki, ruler style Bashchi since 1743) and Shirvan=Shamakha (1748–1786 temporarily split into Khoja Shamakha and Yeni Shamakha), Talysh (1747–1814); Nakhichevan and (Nagorno) Karabakh.

As hinted above, the title Khan was also common in some of the polities of the various – generally Islamic – peoples in the territories of the Mongol Golden Horde and its successor states, which, like the Mongols in general, were commonly called Ta(r)tars (Note: The spelling with 'r' is due to a confusion with tartaros, the classical Greek hell. Genghis Khan's conquering, ransacking Mongol hordes terrorized Islam and Christianity without precedent, as if the apocalypse had started.) by Europeans and Russians, and were all eventually subdued by Muscovia which became the Russian Empire. The most important of these states were:

- Khanate of Kazan (the Mongol term khan became active since Genghizide dynasty was settled in Kazan Duchy in 1430s).
- Sibir Khanate (giving its name to Siberia as the first significant conquest during Russia's great eastern expansion across the Ural range)
- Astrakhan Khanate
- Crimean Khanate.

Further east, in Xinjiang flank:

- Khanate of Kashgaria founded in 1514; 17th century divided into several minor khanates without importance, real power going to the so-called Khwaja, Arabic Islamic religious leaders; title changed to Amir Khan in 1873, annexed by the Qing dynasty in 1877.

=== Compound and derived princely titles ===
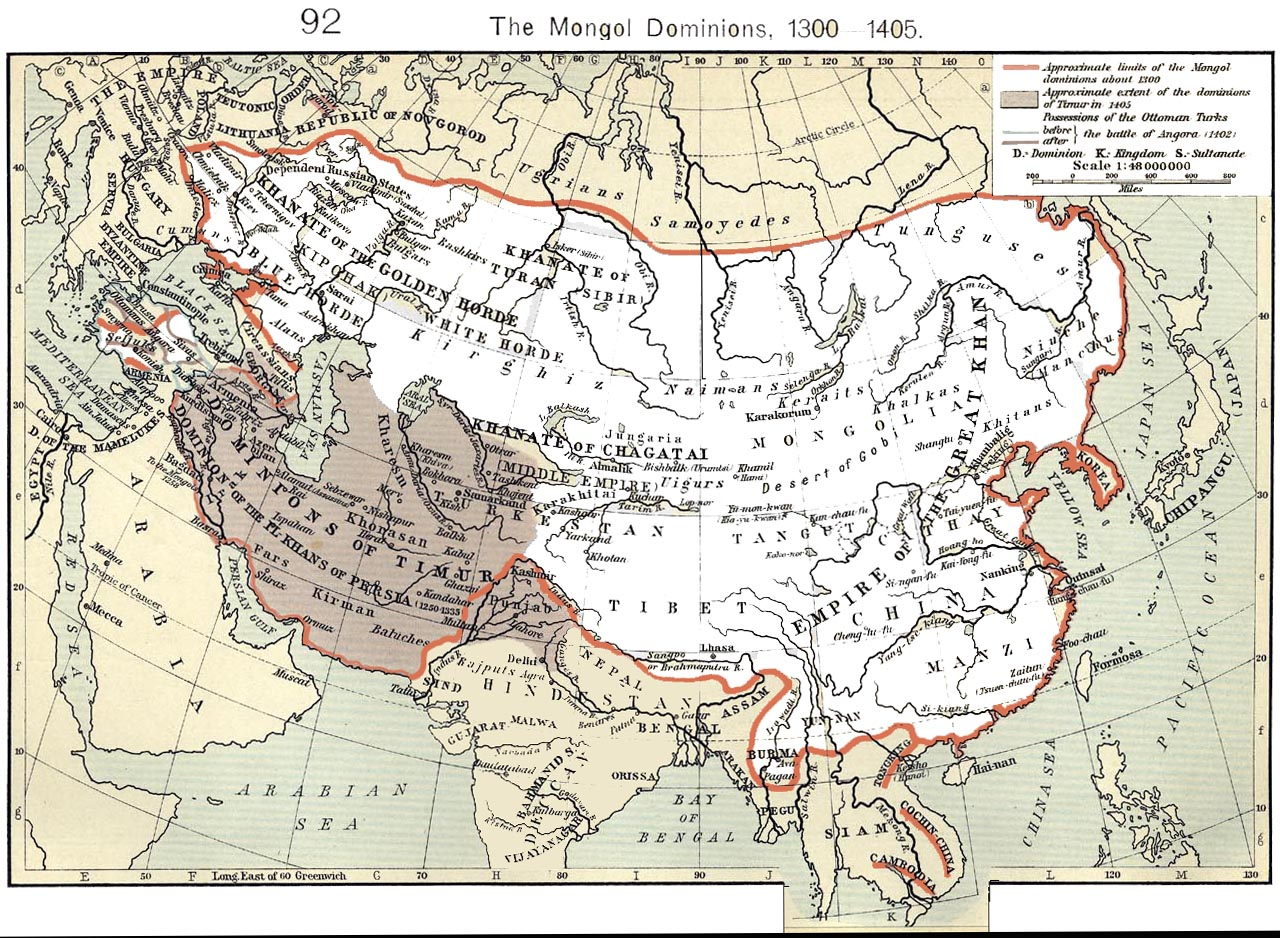
Mongol Empire's largest extent outlined in red; the Timurid Empire is shaded.

The higher, rather imperial title Khaqan ("Khan of Khans") applies to probably the most famous rulers known as Khan: the Mongol imperial dynasty of Genghis Khan (his name was Temüjin, Genghis Khan a never fully understood unique title), and his successors, especially grandson Kublai Khan: the former founded the Mongol Empire and the latter founded the Yuan Dynasty in China. The ruling descendants of the main branch of Genghis Khan's dynasty are referred to as the Great Khans.

The title Khan of Khans was among numerous titles used by the Sultans of the Ottoman Empire as well as the rulers of the Golden Horde and its descendant states. The title Khan was also used in the Seljuk Turk dynasties of the near-east to designate a head of multiple tribes, clans or nations, who was below an Atabeg in rank. Jurchen and Manchu rulers also used the title Khan (Han in Manchu); for example, Nurhaci was called Genggiyen Han. Rulers of the Göktürks, Avars and Khazars used the higher title Kaghan, as rulers of distinct nations.

- Aga Khan (Persian: آقاخان; Arabic: آغا خان; also transliterated as Aqa Khan and Agha Khan) is the title of the Imām of the Nizari Ismāʿīli Shia community serving as their religious head and temporal leader. The title of agha (Āqā in Persian) comes from the Old Turkic and Mongolian aqa, meaning “elder brother”, and is used as a term of respect like “lord” or “master”.
- Beg Khan (a concatenation of Baig and Khan) is a title used by some Mughals and Mongols.
- Gur Khan or Gür Qan, (Note: Mongolian Cyrillic: Гүр Хаан, Gür Xaan; in Mongolian script: ᠭᠦᠷ ᠬᠠᠨ, Gür Qan; simplified Chinese: 菊儿汗; traditional Chinese: 菊兒汗; pinyin: Jú'erhán) meaning “Universal Khan” or “Ruler of All”, was the ruler of the Khitan Kara-Khitai, and had occasionally been used by the Mongols as well. It can be found in the Secret History of the Mongols in the form Gür-qa (Middle Mongolian: ᠭᠦᠷ ᠬᠠ) as the title bestowed upon Jamukha, leader of the Jadaran tribe and former anda (sworn brother) to Genghis Khan.
  - This is not to be confused with Gurkan, Gurkani, or Gurkaniya (Persian: گورکان, Gurkân), a title used by the Timurids and Mughals. This word instead ultimately derives from kürgen (Middle Mongolian: ᠬᠦᠷᠭᠡᠨ, transl. "son-in-law"), a reference to Timur’s marriage into the Chinggisids through his marriage to Saray Mulk Khanum, a direct descendant of Genghis Khan.
- Han, potentially pronounced as Gan or Kan, is a Korean word meaning “great (one), grand, large, much, many”. The Silla language had a usage of this word for “king” or “ruler” as found in the royal titles Maripgan (Korean: 마립간; Hanja: 麻立干) and Geoseogan / Geoseulhan (Korean: 거서간 / 거슬한; Hanja: 居西干 / 居瑟邯). Alexander Vovin suggests this word is related to the Mongolian Khan and Manchurian Han meaning “ruler”, and that the ultimate origin is Xiongnu and Yeniseian.
- Ilkhan or Il-Khan (Persian: ایلخان) is both a generic term for a “provincial Khan” and the traditional royal style for the rulers of the Ilkhanate, one of the Mongol Empire’s successor states based in Persia.
- Kanasubigi (Greek: ΚΑΝΑΣΥΒΙΓΙ, Kana Subigi') was a title of the early Bulgar rulers of the First Bulgarian Empire. Among the proposed translations for the phrase kanasubigi as a whole are “lord of the army”, from the reconstructed Turkic phrase *sü begi, paralleling the attested Old Turkic sü baši, and, more recently, “(ruler) from God”, from the Indo-European *su- and baga-, i.e. *su-baga (an equivalent of the Greek phrase ὁ ἐκ Θεοῦ ἄρχων, ho ek Theou archon, which is common in Bulgar inscriptions).
- Kavhan was one of the most important officials in the First Bulgarian Empire. or Kaukhan According to the generally accepted opinion, he was the second most important person in the state after the Bulgarian ruler.
- Khan Bahadur - a compound of khan (leader) and Bahadur (Brave) - was a formal title of respect and honour, which was conferred exclusively on Muslim subjects of the British Indian Empire. It was a title one degree higher than the title of Khan Sahib.
- Khan Sahib Shri Babi was the complex title of the ruler of the Indian princely state of Bantva-Manavadar (state founded 1760; September 1947 acceded to Pakistan, but 15 February 1948 forced to rescind accession to Pakistan, to accede to India after Khan Sahib's arrest).
- Khan-i-Khanan (Persian: خان‌خانان, “Lord of Lords”) was a title given to the commander-in-chief of the army of the Mughals, an example being Abdul Rahim Khan-I-Khana of the Mughal emperor Akbar's (and later his son Jahangir's) army.
- Khanum (Turkish: Hanım; Azerbaijani: Xanım; Persian: خانم, Xânom) is another female derivation of Khan, notably in Turkic languages, for a Khan's Queen-consort, or in some traditions extended as a courtesy title (a bit like Lady for women not married to a Lord, which is the situation modern Turkish) to the wives of holders of various other (lower) titles. In mostly Persian-speaking Afghanistan, it ended up as the common term for 'Miss', any unmarried woman; in the Iranian Persian language it is used to address any woman respectfully, as in 'Ms. Smith' / 'Khanum-e Smith'. In the modern Kazakh language, Khatun is a derogatory term for women, while Khanum has a respectful meaning.
  - The compound Galin Khanum – literally, “lady bride” – was the title accorded by Qajars to the first Qajar or highborn permanent (aqdi) wife of the Shah or a prince.
- Khanzada (Urdu: خانزاده) is a title conferred to princes of the dynasties of certain princely states of India. The word also transliterates to “prince” in the Uzbek and Kazakh languages and was used by these Central Asian peoples to honor their princes.
- Khatun, or Khatan (Persian: خاتون) – a title of Iranian Sogdian origin – is roughly equal to a King's queen in Mongolic and Turkic languages, as by this title a ruling Khan's Queen-consort (wife) is designated with similar respect after their proclamation as Khan and Khatun. Used in the Khazar language in place of Khanum). Famous Khatuns include Töregene Khatun and .Habba Khatun
- Qara Khaqan, or Qara Khan (Karakhanid: قَرا خاقانْ, Karā Xāqān; Persian: قراخان, Qarākhān) was the foremost title of the Karluk rulers of the Kara-Khanid Khanate, as well as the source of its name. The Old Turkic word qara (𐰴𐰺𐰀) means “black, dark” but may also mean “north”, “courageous”, or serve as an intensifier.

== Other khans ==
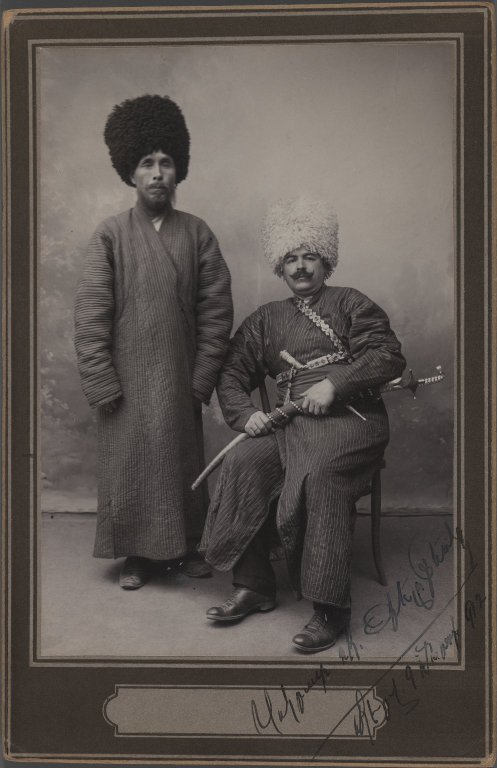
Two Khans in Turkoman Tribal Costume, One of 274 Vintage Photographs. Brooklyn Museum.

=== Noble and honorary titles ===
In imperial Persia, Khan (female form Khanum in Persia) was the title of a nobleman, higher than Beg (or bey) and usually used after the given name. At the Qajar court, precedence for those not belonging to the dynasty was mainly structured in eight classes, each being granted an honorary rank title, the fourth of which was Khan, or in this context synonymously Amir, granted to commanders of armed forces, provincial tribal leaders; in descending order. In neighboring Ottoman Turkey and subsequently the Republic of Turkey, the term Khanum was and is still written as Hanım in Turkish/Ottoman Turkish language. The Ottoman title of Hanımefendi (lit translated; lady of the master), is also a derivative of this.

The titles Khan and Khan Bahadur (from the Altaic root baghatur), related to the Turkic batyr or batur and Mongolian baatar ("brave, hero"); were also bestowed in feudal India by the Mughals, who although Muslims were of Turkic origin upon Muslims and awarded this title to Hindus generals in army particularly in Gaud or Bengal region during Muslim rulers, and later by the British Raj, as an honor akin to the ranks of nobility, often for loyalty to the crown. Khan Sahib was another title of honour.

In the major Indian Muslim state of Hyderabad, Khan was the lowest of the aristocratic titles bestowed by the ruling Nizam upon Muslim retainers, ranking under Khan Bahadur, Nawab (homonymous with a high Muslim ruler's title), Jang, Daula, Mulk, Umara, Jah. The equivalent for the courts Hindu retainers was Rai. In Swat, a Pakistani Frontier State, it was the title of the secular elite, who together with the Mullahs (Muslim clerics), proceeded to elect a new Amir-i-Shariyat in 1914. It seems unclear whether the series of titles known from the Bengal sultanate are merely honorific or perhaps relate to a military hierarchy.

=== Other uses ===
Like many titles, the meaning of the term has also extended southwards into South Asian countries, and Central Asian nations, where it has become a common surname.

Khan and its female forms occur in many personal names, generally without any nobiliary of political relevance, although it remains a common part of noble names as well. Notably in South Asia it has become a part of many South Asian Muslim names, especially when Pashtun (also known as Afghan) descent is claimed. It is also used by many Muslim Rajputs of Indian subcontinent who were awarded this surname by Mughals for their bravery. and it's widely used by Baloch and Awan tribes.

== Khan-related terms ==
- Khanzadeh (Tatar: Xanzadä) – a prince, khan's son
- Khanbikeh (Tatar: Xanbikä) – a queen, khan's wife
- Khanbaliq (or Dadu) – Yuan capital which later developed into modern Beijing.
- Il khan
- Bogda Khan
- Khan of Heaven
- Khatun, Khanum – female equivalent of Khan or title of women of the Khan's family

== See also ==
- Kaan (name)
- Khanate
- Turco-Mongol
- Pashtuns
- List of Mongol rulers
- Aga Khan
- Azmatkhan
- Ejen
- Jirga
- Khagan
- Chanyu
- Archon
- King
- Bey
- Beg Khan
- Elteber
- Tsar
- Kaiser
- Crimean Khanate
- Khong Tayiji
- Khan (surname)
- Khan of Heaven
