= Reyhan, Kerman =

Reyhan ريحان
- Village
- Location within Iran
- Coordinates: 31°05′49″N 56°44′38″E
- Country: Iran
- Province: Kerman
- County: Ravar
- Bakhsh: Central
- Rural District: Ravar

Population (2006)
  - Total: 271
- Time zone: UTC+3:30 (IRST)
  - Summer (DST): UTC+4:30 (IRDT)

Reyhan (Persian: ريحان, also Romanized as Reyḩān; also known as Reyḩānābād) is a village in Ravar Rural District, in the Central District of Ravar County, Kerman Province, Iran. At the 2006 census, its population was 271, in 80 families.
