= Tik Dar, Ravar =

Tik Dar تيكدر
- Village
- Location within Iran
- Coordinates: 31°32′01″N 56°30′11″E
- Country: Iran
- Province: Kerman
- County: Ravar
- Bakhsh: Central
- Rural District: Ravar

Population (2006)
  - Total: 18
- Time zone: UTC+3:30 (IRST)
  - Summer (DST): UTC+4:30 (IRDT)

Tik Dar (Persian: تيكدر, also Romanized as Tīk Dar; also known as Takdar) is a village in Ravar Rural District, in the Central District of Ravar County, Kerman Province, Iran. At the 2006 census, its population was 18, in 5 families.
