= Shahzadeh Mohammad =

Shahzadeh Mohammad (Persian: شاهزاده محمد) may refer to:

- Shahzadeh Mohammad, Kerman
- Shahzadeh Mohammad, Khuzestan
- Shahzadeh Mohammad, Boyer-Ahmad, Kohgiluyeh and Boyer-Ahmad Province
