= Heruz =

Heruz or Haruz (Persian: هروز), also rendered as Huruz or Hurus, may refer to:

- Heruz-e Olya
- Heruz-e Sofla
- Heruz Rural District
