= Deh-e Ali, Ravar =

Village in Kerman province, Iran

Deh-e Ali Persian: ده علي
- Village
- Location within Iran
- Coordinates: 31°19′28″N 56°47′52″E
- Country: Iran
- Province: Kerman
- County: Ravar
- District: Central
- Rural District: Ravar

Population (2016)
  - Total: 1,012
- Time zone: UTC+3:30 (IRST)

Deh-e Ali (Persian: ده علي( (Note: Also romanized as Deh ‘Alī and Deh-e ‘Alī) is a village in, and the capital of, Ravar Rural District of the Central District of Ravar County, Kerman province, Iran.

== Demographics ==
=== Population ===
At the time of the 2006 National Census, the village's population was 837 in 207 households. The following census in 2011 counted 965 people in 296 households. The 2016 census measured the population of the village as 1,012 people in 334 households.
