= Dehuj, Ravar =

Dehuj دهوج
- Village
- Location within Iran
- Coordinates: 31°15′08″N 56°50′58″E
- Country: Iran
- Province: Kerman
- County: Ravar
- Bakhsh: Central
- Rural District: Ravar

Population (2006)
  - Total: 238
- Time zone: UTC+3:30 (IRST)
  - Summer (DST): UTC+4:30 (IRDT)

Dehuj (Persian: دهوج, also Romanized as Dehūj; also known as Deh Hūj) is a village in Ravar Rural District, in the Central District of Ravar County, Kerman Province, Iran. At the 2006 census, its population was 238, in 67 families.
