= Biduiyeh-ye Nakhai =

Biduiyeh-ye Nakhai بيدوئيه نخعي
- Village
- Location within Iran
- Coordinates: 30°48′52″N 56°59′29″E
- Country: Iran
- Province: Kerman
- County: Ravar
- Bakhsh: Kuhsaran
- Rural District: Heruz

Population (2006)
  - Total: 69
- Time zone: UTC+3:30 (IRST)
  - Summer (DST): UTC+4:30 (IRDT)

Biduiyeh-ye Nakhai (Persian: بيدوئيه نخعي, also Romanized as Bīdū’īyeh-ye Nakhaʿī; also known as Bīdū’īyeh) is a village in Heruz Rural District, Kuhsaran District, Ravar County, Kerman Province, Iran. At the 2006 census, its population was 69, in 20 families.
