= Roqeh =

Roqeh (Persian: رقعه) may refer to:

- Roqeh-ye Kabir
- Roqeh-ye Soghirah
