= Taraz, Iran =

Taraz or Tarz (Persian: تراز or طرز or طراز) may refer to:

- Taraz, Narmashir, Kerman Province (طرز - Ţaraz)
- Tarz, Ravar, Kerman Province (طرز - Ţarz)
- Taraz, Khuzestan (تراز - Tārāz)
- Taraz, Markazi (طراز - Ţarāz)
- Taraz, Razavi Khorasan (طراز - Ţarāz)
