= Gach-e Olya =

Gach-e Olya گچ عليا
- Village
- Location within Iran
- Coordinates: 30°40′40″N 57°05′38″E
- Country: Iran
- Province: Kerman
- County: Ravar
- Bakhsh: Kuhsaran
- Rural District: Horjand

Population (2006)
  - Total: 113
- Time zone: UTC+3:30 (IRST)
  - Summer (DST): UTC+4:30 (IRDT)

Gach-e Olya (Persian: گچ عليا, also Romanized as Gach-e ‘Olyā and Gach ‘Olyā; also known as Gach-e Bālā) is a village in Horjand Rural District, Kuhsaran District, Ravar County, Kerman Province, Iran. At the 2006 census, its population was 113, in 30 families.
