= Tikdar =

Tikdar or Tik Dar (Persian: تيكدر) may refer to:

- Tikdar, Kerman
- Tik Dar, Ravar, Kerman Province
- Tikdar-e Pay Sang, Kerman Province
