= Khvorand =

Khvorand خورند
- Village
- Location within Iran
- Coordinates: 31°09′01″N 56°42′05″E
- Country: Iran
- Province: Kerman
- County: Ravar
- Bakhsh: Central
- Rural District: Ravar

Population (2006)
  - Total: 627
- Time zone: UTC+3:30 (IRST)
  - Summer (DST): UTC+4:30 (IRDT)

Khvorand (Persian: خورند, also Romanized as Khowrend and Khūrand; also known as Khorand and Kuran) is a village in Ravar Rural District, in the Central District of Ravar County, Kerman Province, Iran. At the 2006 census, its population was 627, in 237 families.
