= Tarz, Ravar =

Tarz طرز
- Village
- Location within Iran
- Coordinates: 31°23′50″N 56°29′45″E
- Country: Iran
- Province: Kerman
- County: Ravar
- Bakhsh: Central
- Rural District: Ravar

Population (2006)
  - Total: 635
- Time zone: UTC+3:30 (IRST)
  - Summer (DST): UTC+4:30 (IRDT)

Tarz (Persian: طرز, also Romanized as Ţarz) is a village in Ravar Rural District, in the Central District of Ravar County, Kerman Province, Iran. At the 2006 census, its population was 635, in 176 families.
