= Kujur =

Kujur (Persian: كوجور) may refer to:

- Kujur, Kerman
- Kujur, Mazandaran

== People ==
- Gangotri Kujur, Indian politician
