= Feyzabad-e Sofla =

Feyzabad-e Sofla (Persian: فيض ابادسفلي) may refer to:

- Feyzabad-e Sofla, Kerman
- Feyzabad-e Sofla, Yazd
