= Gowjar =

Gowjar or Gujar (Persian: گوجر) may refer to the following places in Iran:

- Gowjar, Kerman
- Gowjar, West Azerbaijan

== See also ==
- Gujar (disambiguation)
- Gurjar, an ethnic nomadic community in India, Pakistan and Afghanistan
