= Mughal dynasty =

Dynasty of the Mughal Empire

House of Babur
- Imperial dynasty
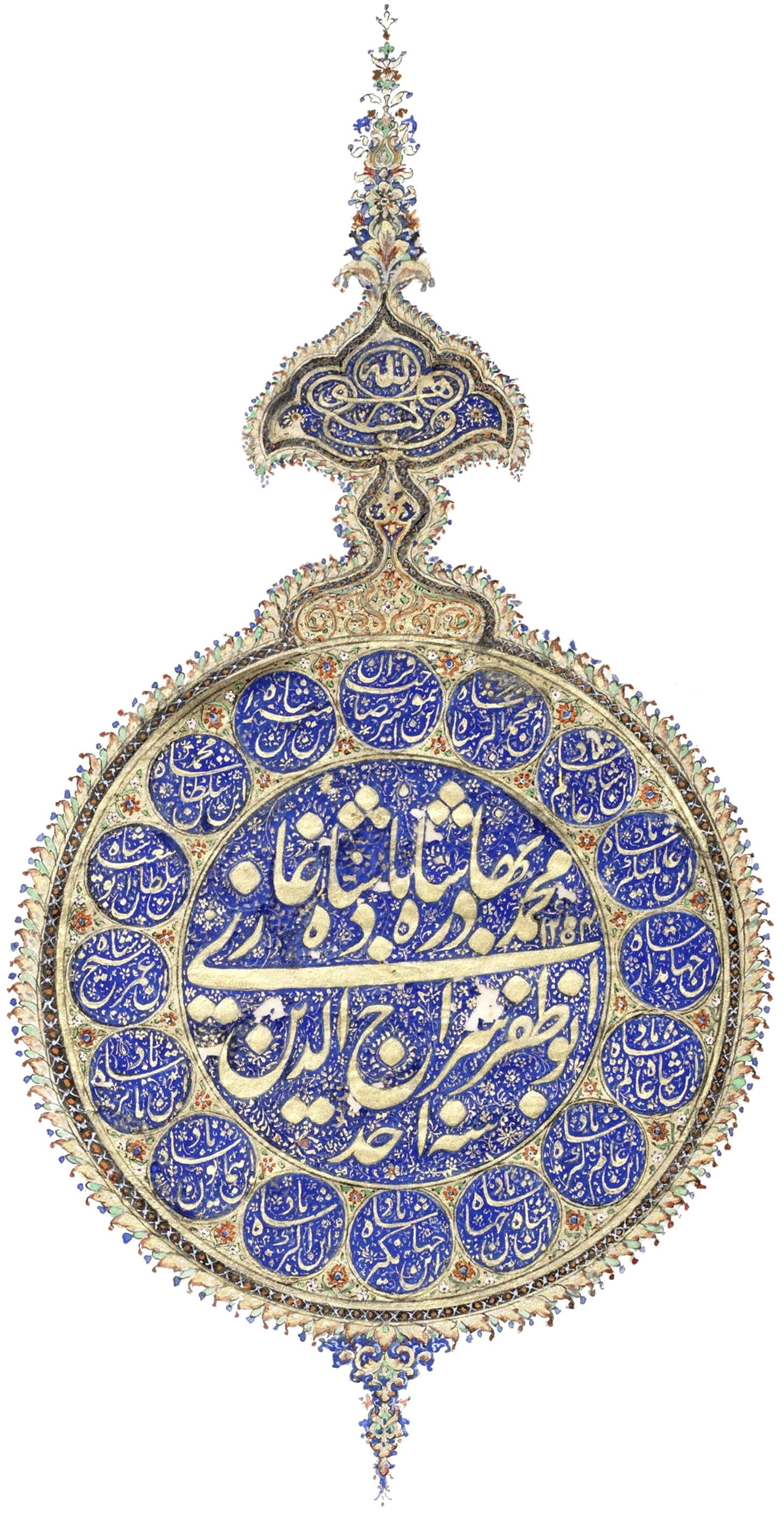
- Imperial seal (1837–1857)
- Parent house: Timurid dynasty
- Country: Mughal India
- Origin: Timurid Empire
- Founded: 21 April 1526
- Founder: Babur
- Final ruler: Bahadur Shah II
- Titles: List: Badshah of Hindustan; Khan of Khans; Sultan of Sultans; Shah of Shahs; Mughal Caliph; Gurkani; Sardar; Khan; Baig; Sheikh; Mirza; Shah; Sultan; Malik; Shahzade; Shahzadi; Padshah Begum; Hazrat Ishaan (Title), special title for a distinguished branch of Princes, descending from Jahangir and Aurangzeb, leading the Naqshbandi Sufi order
- Traditions: Sunni Islam (1526–1857); Din-i Ilahi (1582–1605)
- Dissolution: 1857
- Deposition: 21 September 1857

The Mughal dynasty (Persian: دودمان مغل, romanized: Dūdmān-i-Muġal) or the House of Babur (Persian: خاندانِ آلِ بابُر, romanized: Xāndān-i-Āl-i-Bābur), was a branch of the Timurid dynasty that ruled South Asia and other territories spanning from inner Persia to the borders of China, including present-day regions of Afghanistan, Pakistan, Bangladesh, Iran, Iraq, northern India, and Burma, as a unified Empire of the Mughals.

Founded in 1526 by Babur, the Mughals reigned over South Asia and parts of the Middle East until the early 18th century, thereafter continuing their roles as imperial suzerains until 1857. At the dynasty’s height under Akbar the Great in the 16th and early 17th centuries, the Mughal Empire was one of the largest empires in history and the richest in the world. Later commanding the world’s largest military under Emperor Aurangzeb, the Mughal dynasty was the dominant force in Asia.

The Mughals trace their origins from the imperial branches of the Barlas and Borjigin clans which ruled the Mongol Empire and its successor states. Emperor Babur himself (b. 1483) was a direct descendant of the Turco-Mongol conqueror Timur (1336–1405) on his father's side, and of Mongol emperor Genghis Khan on his mother's side. Later descendants genealogically held Safavid Persian and noble Indian heritage as well, since Mughal Royals often pursued marriage alliances with prominent houses throughout Persia and India.

Throughout most of the Mughal dynasty's history, the throne of the Mughal Empire was continuously occupied by a singular Emperor who functioned as the absolute head of state, government, and military. Largely secular, the Mughal Court saw communal ceremonies that included prominent Maratha, Rajput, and Sikh leaders alongside Muslim elites; all acknowledging the Emperor as the sole sovereign of the greater subcontinent. Later in the dynasty’s history, much of the power shifted to the office of the Grand Vizier as the empire became divided into many regional kingdoms and princely states. As a consequence, the dynasty also produced the Nawabs (nobles) of Hyderabad, Delhi, Kashmir, Lahore, Lucknow, Aligarh, Dhaka, and Bengal, among other prominent bloodlines.

== Mughal Empire ==
The closest to an official name for the empire was Hindustan, which was documented in the Ain-i-Akbari. Mughal administrative records also refer to the empire as "dominion of Hindustan" (Wilāyat-i-Hindustān), "country of Hind" (Bilād-i-Hind), "Sultanate of al-Hind" (Salṭanat(i) al-Hindīyyah), as observed in the epitaph of Emperor Aurangzeb, or endonymous identification from emperor Bahadur Shah Zafar as "Land of Hind" (Hindostān) in Hindustani. Contemporary Chinese chronicles referred to the empire as Hindustan (Héndūsītǎn).

== History ==
The Mughal empire is conventionally said to have been founded in 1526 by Babur, a Timurid prince from Andijan which today is in Uzbekistan. After losing his ancestral domains in Central Asia, Babur first established himself in Kabul and ultimately moved towards the Indian subcontinent. Mughal rule was interrupted for 16 years by the Sur Emperors during Humayun's reign. Famed Russian linguist and physicist, Vladimir Braginskiĭ, also believed that the Hikayat Aceh literature from Aceh Sultanate were influenced by Mughal dynasty historiography, as he found out the literal structure similarities of Hikayat Aceh with Mahfuzat-i-Timuri, as the former has shared the similar theme with the latter about the lifetime and exploits of the protagonist of Mahfuzat-i-Timuri, Timur. Braginskiĭ also found the similarities in structure of both Hikayat Aceh and Mahfuzat-i-Timuri with Akbarnama manuscript.

The Mughal imperial structure was founded by Akbar the Great around the 1580s which lasted until the 1740s, until shortly after the Battle of Karnal. During the reigns of Shah Jahan and Aurangzeb, the dynasty reached its zenith in terms of geographical extent, economy, military and cultural influence.

Around 1700, the dynasty was ruling the wealthiest empire in the world, with also the largest military on earth. Mughals had approximately 24 percent share of the world's economy and a military of one million soldiers. At that time the Mughals ruled almost the whole of South Asia with 160 million subjects, 23 percent of the world's population. The Dynasty's power rapidly dwindled during the 18th century with internal dynastic conflicts, incompatible monarchs, foreign invasions from Persians and Afghans, as well as revolts from Marathas, Sikh, Rajputs and regional Nawabs. The power of the last emperor was limited only to the Walled city of Delhi.

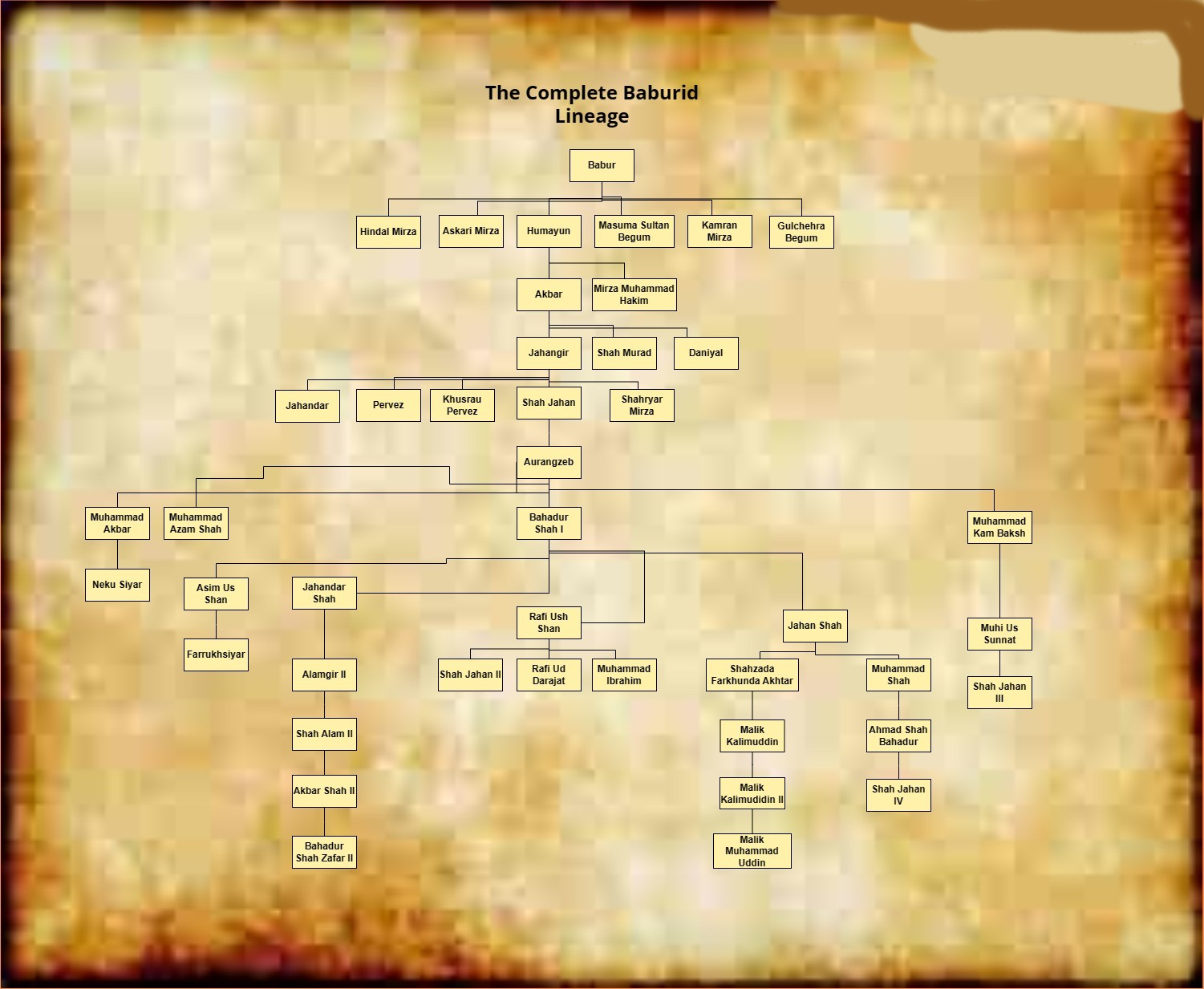
The Mughal Lineage; represents all the descendants mentioned in written sources and verbal sources found and researched in the New Era. Contains male issues only.

Many of the Mughals had significant Indian and Persian ancestry through marriage alliances as they were born to Persian princesses. Mughals played a great role in the flourishing of Ganga-Jamuni tehzeeb (Indo-Islamic civilization). Mughals were also great patrons of art, culture, literature and architecture. Mughal painting, architecture, culture, clothing, cuisine and Urdu language; all were flourished during Mughal era. Mughals were not only guardians of art and culture but they also took interest in these fields personally. Emperor Babur, Aurangzeb and Shah Alam II were great calligraphers, Jahangir was a great painter, Shah Jahan was a great architect while Bahadur Shah II was a great poet of Urdu.

As the last Mughal Emperor, Bahadur Shah II (r. 1837–1857) was tried and convicted by the British East India Company before sentenced to exile in Rangoon, situated in British-controlled Burma (present-day Myanmar). The imperial family was hence abolished, and the empire was dissolved on 21 September 1857 after the Indian Rebellion of 1857. The UK declared the establishment of the British Raj the following year.

== Succession to the throne ==
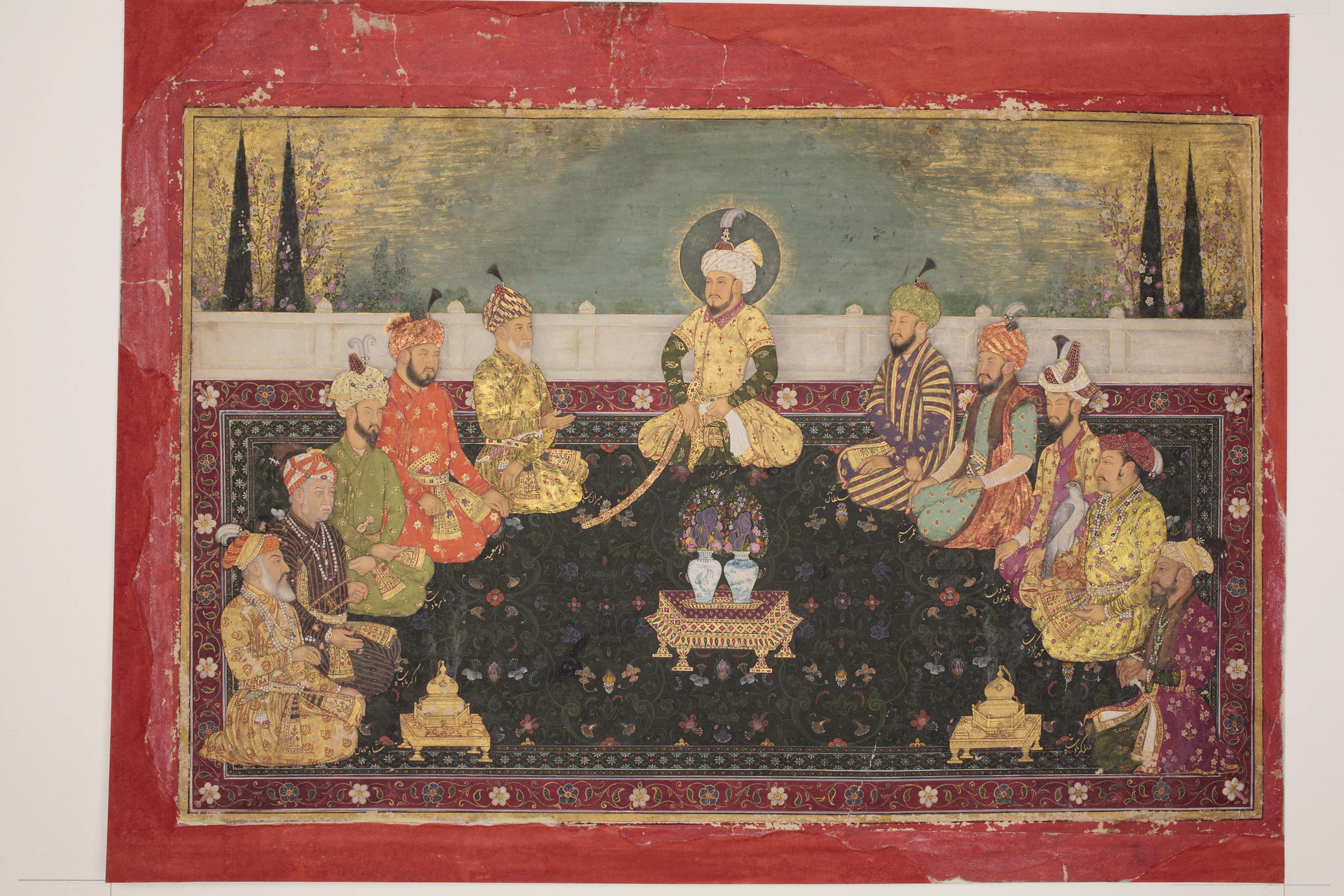
Group portrait of Mughal rulers, from Babur to Aurangzeb, with the Mughal ancestor Timur seated in the middle. On the right: Shah Jahan, Akbar and Babur, with Abu Sa'id of Samarkand and Timur's son, Miran Shah. On the left: Aurangzeb, Jahangir and Humayun, and two of Timur's other offspring Umar Shaykh and Muhammad Sultan. Created c. 1707–12

The Mughal dynasty operated under several basic premises: that the Emperor governed the empire's entire territory with complete sovereignty, that only one person at a time could be the Emperor, and that every male member of the dynasty was hypothetically eligible to become Emperor, even though an heir-apparent was appointed several times in dynastic history. The certain processes through which imperial princes rose to the Peacock Throne, however, were very specific to the Mughal Empire. To go into greater detail about these processes, the history of succession between Emperors can be divided into two eras: Era of Imperial successions (1526–1713) and Era of Regent successions (1713–1857).

== Disputed headship of dynasty ==
The Mughal Emperors practiced polygamy. Besides their wives, they also had several concubines in their harem, who produced children. This makes it difficult to identify all the offspring of each emperor.

A man in India named Habeebuddin Tucy claims to be a descendant of Bahadur Shah II, but his claim is not universally believed.

Another woman named Sultana Begum who lives in the slums of Kolkata has claimed that her late husband, Mirza Mohammad Bedar Bakht was the great-grandson of Bahadur Shah II.

Yaqoob Ziauddin Tucy is a sixth generation descendant of the last Mughal Emperor Bahadur Shah Zafar. Living in Hyderabad, he still believes that the government will release properties of the erstwhile Mughals to the legal heirs. He also demands restoration of scholarships for Mughal descendants, that was discontinued by the government in May of 2004. He wants that amount be raised to ₹8,000 and that the government should grant the economically depressed Mughal descendants the money for their upliftment. Tucy has two sons.

Yaqoob Ziauddin Tucy also has a younger brother Yaqoob Shajeeuddin Tucy. Shajeeuddin Tucy has served the country as a part of the Indian Air Force. He has been the state guest to Tashkent, Uzbekistan along with his two elder brothers. He frequently travels to the Middle East and central Asia. He lives in Hyderabad along with his two sons Yaqoob Muzammiluddin Tucy and Yaqoob Mudassiruddin Tucy.
