= Khorand =

Khorand (Persian: خرند) may refer to:

- Khorand, Hamadan
- Khorand, Kerman
