= Reyhanabad =

Reyhanabad (Persian: ريحان اباد) may refer to:

- Reyhanabad, Kerman
- Reyhanabad, Mazandaran
- Reyhanabad, Tehran
- Reyhanabad, West Azerbaijan
