= HNLMS L 9609 =

Two ships of the Royal Netherlands Navy have been named HNLMS L 9609:

- HNLMS L 9609 (1946), a LCT Mark 4 that entered service in 1946, previously operated by the Royal Navy
- HNLMS L 9609 (1954), a landing craft that entered service on 4 June 1960, left service in 1969, and was sold to a Curaçaoan transport company
