= Heruz-e Sofla =

Village in Kerman province, Iran

Heruz-e Sofla Persian: هروز سفلي
- Village
- Location within Iran
- Coordinates: 30°44′17″N 57°02′11″E
- Country: Iran
- Province: Kerman
- County: Ravar
- District: Kuhsaran
- Rural District: Heruz

Population (2016)
  - Total: 416
- Time zone: UTC+3:30 (IRST)

Heruz-e Sofla (Persian: هروزسفلي) (Note: Also romanized as Harūz-e Soflá and Herūz-e Soflá; also known as Herūz, Harūz-e Pā’īn, and Herūz-e Pā’īn) is a village in Heruz Rural District of Kuhsaran District, Ravar County, Kerman province, Iran.

== Demographics ==
=== Population ===
At the time of the 2006 National Census, the village's population was 176 in 50 households. The following census in 2011 counted 358 people in 110 households. The 2016 census measured the population of the village as 416 people in 125 households. It was the most populous village in its rural district.
