= Feyzabad, Ravar =

Village in Kerman province, Iran

Feyzabad Persian: فيض اباد
- Village
- Location within Iran
- Coordinates: 31°20′42″N 56°29′32″E
- Country: Iran
- Province: Kerman
- County: Ravar
- District: Central
- Rural District: Ravar

Population (2016)
  - Total: 1,415
- Time zone: UTC+3:30 (IRST)

Feyzabad (Persian: فيض اباد) (Note: Also romanized as Feyẕābād; also known as Feyẕābād-e Soflá and Fūz) is a village in Ravar Rural District of the Central District of Ravar County, Kerman province, Iran.

== Demographics ==
=== Population ===
At the time of the 2006 National Census, the village's population was 1,060 in 287 households. The following census in 2011 counted 1,242 people in 372 households. The 2016 census measured the population of the village as 1,415 people in 422 households. It was the most populous village in its rural district.
