= Gowjar, Kerman =

Gowjar گوجر
- Village
- Location within Iran
- Coordinates: 31°32′00″N 56°30′00″E
- Country: Iran
- Province: Kerman
- County: Ravar
- Bakhsh: Central
- Rural District: Ravar

Population (2006)
  - Total: 537
- Time zone: UTC+3:30 (IRST)
  - Summer (DST): UTC+4:30 (IRDT)

Gowjar (Persian: گوجر; also known as Gūhjahr, Gujur, Kūh Jahr, and Kūjūr) is a village in Ravar Rural District, in the Central District of Ravar County, Kerman Province, Iran. At the 2006 census, its population was 537, in 156 families.

== See also ==
- Kerman province
