= HNLMS L 9609 (1954) =

Royal Netherlands Navy landing craft

History

Dutch New Guinea
- Name: Kais
- Builder: Arnhemse Scheepsbouw Maatschappij, Arnhem, Netherlands
- Laid down: 1 June 1954
- Launched: 4 September 1954
- Commissioned: 18 October 1954
- Fate: Sold to the Royal Netherlands Navy

History

Netherlands
- Name: L 9609
- Acquired: 1960
- Commissioned: 4 June 1960
- Nickname(s): Klep 9
- Fate: Sold to a Curaçaoan transport company

History

Curaçao
- Name: Elizabeth
- Fate: Last seen in 1991 at a Curaçaoan scrapyard

General characteristics
- Type: Landing craft
- Displacement: 415 long tons (422 t)
- Length: 46.01 m (151.0 ft)
- Beam: 11.25 m (36.9 ft)
- Draught: 2.70 m (8.9 ft)
- Installed power: 2 × 300 hp (220 kW)
- Propulsion: 2 × Kromhout diesel engines; 2 × shafts
- Speed: 8.5 kn (9.8 mph; 15.7 km/h)
- Complement: 22
- Armament: After conversion: 2 × 20 mm (0.79 in) machine guns

HNLMS L 9609 was a landing craft of the Royal Netherlands Navy (RNLN). She was originally built in 1954 for the Netherlands New Guinea Petroleum Company and named MS Kais. In 1960 the RNLN bought the ship and stationed her at Biak in Dutch New Guinea. Later she was also stationed in Curaçao before being decommissioned in 1969. After her service in the RNLN the ship served as pontoon for a local transport company in Curaçao and was named Elizabeth.

== Design and construction ==
L 9609 was built in 1954 for the Netherlands New Guinea Petroleum Company at the Arnhemse Scheepsbouw Maatschappij in Arnhem, Netherlands. She was laid down on 1 June 1954, launched on 4 September 1954 and commissioned as MS Kais on 18 October 1954. The ship was designed as a landing craft and initially used for transport of materials that were related to the extraction of petroleum around Sorang in Dutch New Guinea. For this purpose she had a large lowerable ramp at the bow, which allowed materials to be easily transported aboard and ashore. The landing craft had a displacement of 415 tons and a crew of 22 persons. When it came to measurements, she had a length of 46.01 metres, a beam of 11.25 metres and a draught of 2.70 metres. Furthermore, she was equipped with two Kromhout diesel engines that could each produce 300 horsepower, for a total of 600 hp. This allowed the craft to reach a maximum speed of 8.5 knots.

=== Conversion ===
After being transferred to the Royal Netherlands Navy (RNLN) in 1960 and renamed L 9609, she was modified in Mankwari. During her modification the landing craft was equipped with two 20 mm machine guns and she was painted according to the RNLN color scheme.

== Service history ==
In January 1964 L 9609 performed sea trials after being repaired.

In 1965 L 9609 took part in several landing exercises with the Netherlands Marine Corps, RNLN and Netherlands Naval Aviation Service in the Dutch Caribbean to practice Amphibious warfare.

In February 1970 an advertisement was placed in the newspaper Amigoe di Curaçao, which stated that people could bid on the former L 9609 until 14 March 1970. In addition, there would also be viewing days at the Parera Naval Base on 2, 3 and 4 March for those that were interested in bidding on the landing craft.

The landing craft was last seen in 1991 at a Curaçaoan scrapyard while partially sunken.

== See also ==
Equivalent landing craft of the same era

- Barbe class

== Citations ==
=== Bibliography ===
- van Amstel, W.H.E. (1991). De schepen van de Koninklijke Marine vanaf 1945 (in Dutch). Alkmaar: De Alk. ISBN 90-6013-997-6.
- Smit, J.E., ed. (November 2021). "Grauwe klep: De hachelijke zeereis van Hr. Ms. L 9609 van Nieuw-Guinea naar Curaçao" (PDF). Marineblad (in Dutch). Vol. 131, no. 7. pp. 21–26.
- Raven, G.J.A., ed. (1988). De kroon op het anker: 175 jaar Koninklijke Marine (in Dutch). Amsterdam: De Bataafsche Leeuw. ISBN 90-6707-200-1.
