= Hojedk =

City in Kerman province, Iran

Hojedk Persian: هجدک
- City
- Location within Iran
- Coordinates: 30°45′34″N 57°00′12″E
- Country: Iran
- Province: Kerman
- County: Ravar
- District: Kuhsaran

Population (2016)
  - Total: 1,007
- Time zone: UTC+3:30 (IRST)

Hojedk (Persian: هجدک) (Note: Also romanized as Hejdak) is a city in, and the capital of, Kuhsaran District of Ravar County, Kerman province, Iran. It also serves as the administrative center for Heruz Rural District.

== Demographics ==
=== Population ===
At the time of the 2006 National Census, the city's population was 938 in 232 households. The following census in 2011 counted 750 people in 218 households. The 2016 census measured the population of the city as 1,007 people in 313 households.

== Earthquakes ==
The city, which is nearly 700 miles southeast of Iran's capital, Tehran, was hit by a major earthquake on 1 December 2017. This resulted in several injuries, following damage to scores of buildings in remote mountainous villages near the city's epicenter. It is home to farms and coal mines, and reportedly often hit by quakes.

In December 2019, a 4.9 magnitude quake, which struck at the depth of 10 kilometers, (6.2 miles) rocked the city. There were no injuries or damage reported.
