= Barbe-class utility landing craft =

German Navy craft since 1965

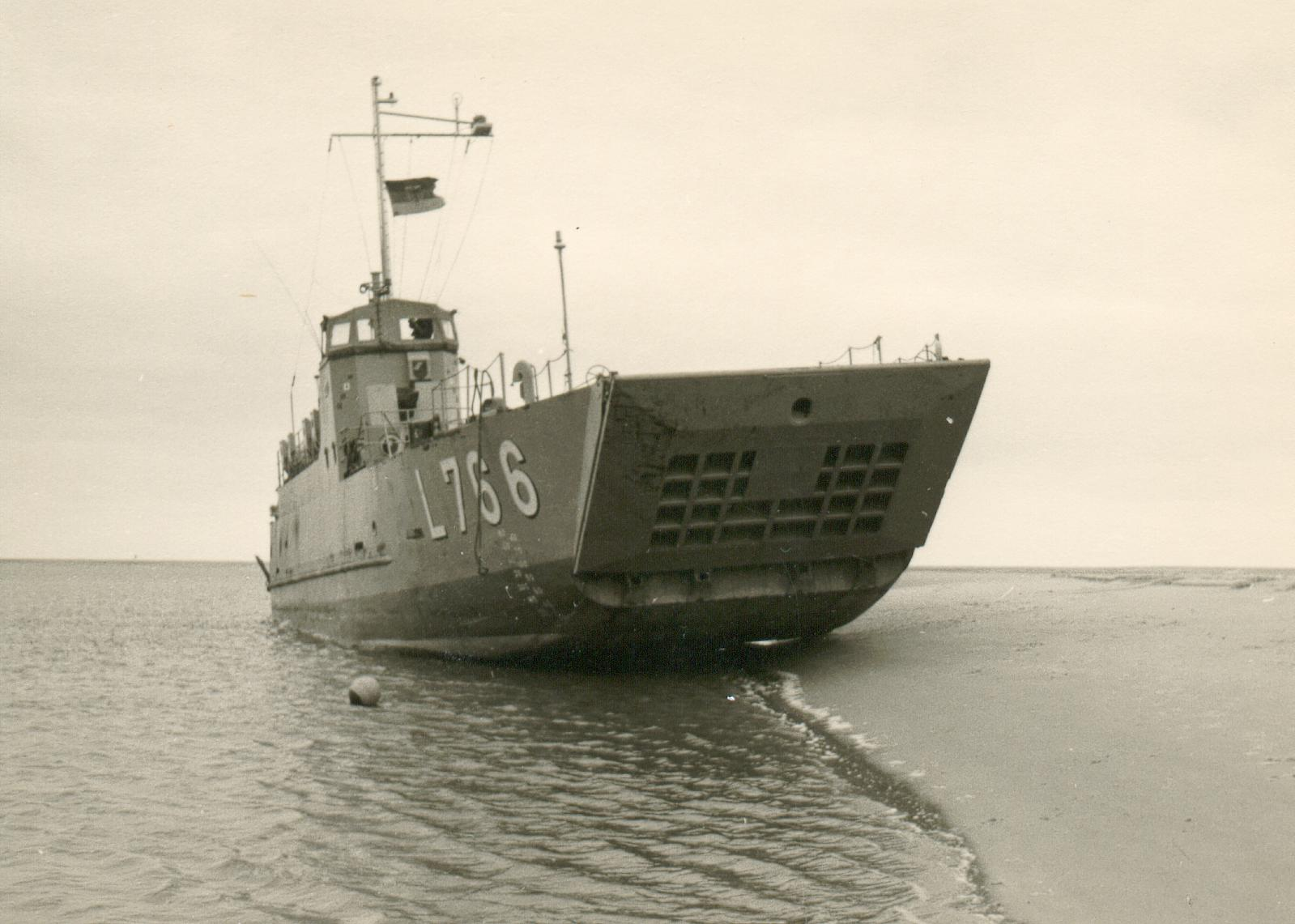
- Stör

Class overview
- Operators: German Navy; Hellenic Navy
- In service: 1965–
- Completed: 22
- Active: 2
- Laid up: 3

General characteristics
- Type: Landing craft
- Displacement: 430 tonnes (420 long tons) (full load)
- Length: 40 m (131 ft 3 in)
- Beam: 8.8 m (28 ft 10 in)
- Draft: 2.1 m (6 ft 11 in)
- Propulsion: 750 kW (1,010 hp)
- Speed: 11 knots (20 km/h; 13 mph)
- Capacity: Up to 150 tonnes (150 long tons)
- Complement: 17
- Armament: 1 or 2 × Rheinmetall MK 20 Rh 202 20 mm (0.79 in) autocannon; Mine laying capability

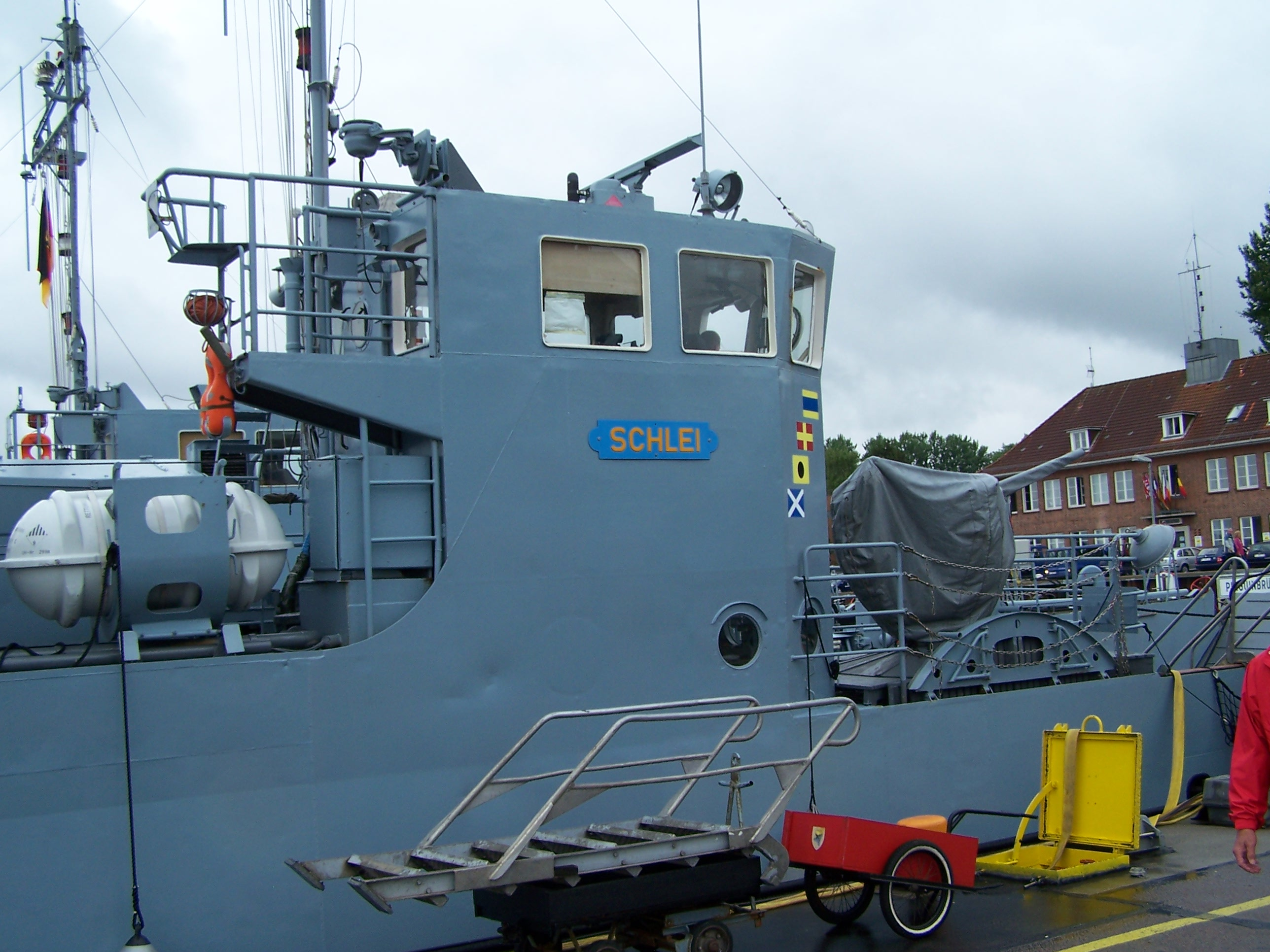
Schlei at the Kiel Week in 2007

The Type 520 Barbe-class utility landing craft are small units of the German Navy used for landing or transporting troops, supply, equipment and also for coastal mine laying.

The remaining boat in service is currently part of the SEK-M the naval special forces of Germany, however the navy plans to procure an entire new class of landing craft.

They are the only boats in the German Navy commanded by Chief Petty Officers.

== List of ships ==
Pennant number	Name	Type (last upgrade)	Call sign	Com- missioned	Decom- missioned	Fate
L788	Butt	520C		7 May 1965	4 December 1992	scrapped(?)
L789	Brasse	520C		7 May 1965	16 April 1992	scrapped(?)
L790	Barbe	520A		10 January 1966	29 September 1991	to Hellenic Navy
L791	Delphin	520B		10 January 1966	29 September 1991	to Hellenic Navy
L760	Flunder	520D	DRIE	22 February 1966	?	decommissioned
L761	Karpfen	520A		2 February 1966	30 January 1992	scrapped(?)
L762	Lachs	520A	DRIG	24 March 1966	23 October 2024	decommissioned
L763	Plötze	520A	DRIH	24 March 1966	?	decommissioned
L764	Rochen	520A		26 April 1966	7 February 1992	to Hellenic Navy
L792	Dorsch	520A		24 June 1966	29 September 1991	to Hellenic Navy
L793	Felchen	520A		23 June 1966	25 October 1991	to Hellenic Navy
L794	Forelle	520A		7 June 1966	1 November 1991	to Hellenic Navy
L765	Schlei	520B	DRIM	26 July 1966		decommissioned 2017
L766	Stör	520A		26 July 1966	16 September 1992	scrapped(?)
L767	Tümmler	520A		26 June 1966	16 September 1992	scrapped(?)
L768	Wels	520A		27 June 1966	11 December 1992	scrapped(?)
L769	Zander	520A	DRIQ	26 August 1966	?	decommissioned
L795	Inger	520A		16 August 1966	9 September 1991	to Hellenic Navy
L796	Makrele	520A		16 September 1966	8 November 1991	to Hellenic Navy
L797	Muräne	520A		16 September 1966	14 February 1992	to Hellenic Navy
L798	Renke	520A		26 October 1966	1 October 1988	to Hellenic Navy
L799	Salm	520A		26 October 1966	1 October 1988	to Hellenic Navy

The ships are named after fish, with the exception of Delphin (dolphin) and Tümmler (toothed whales):

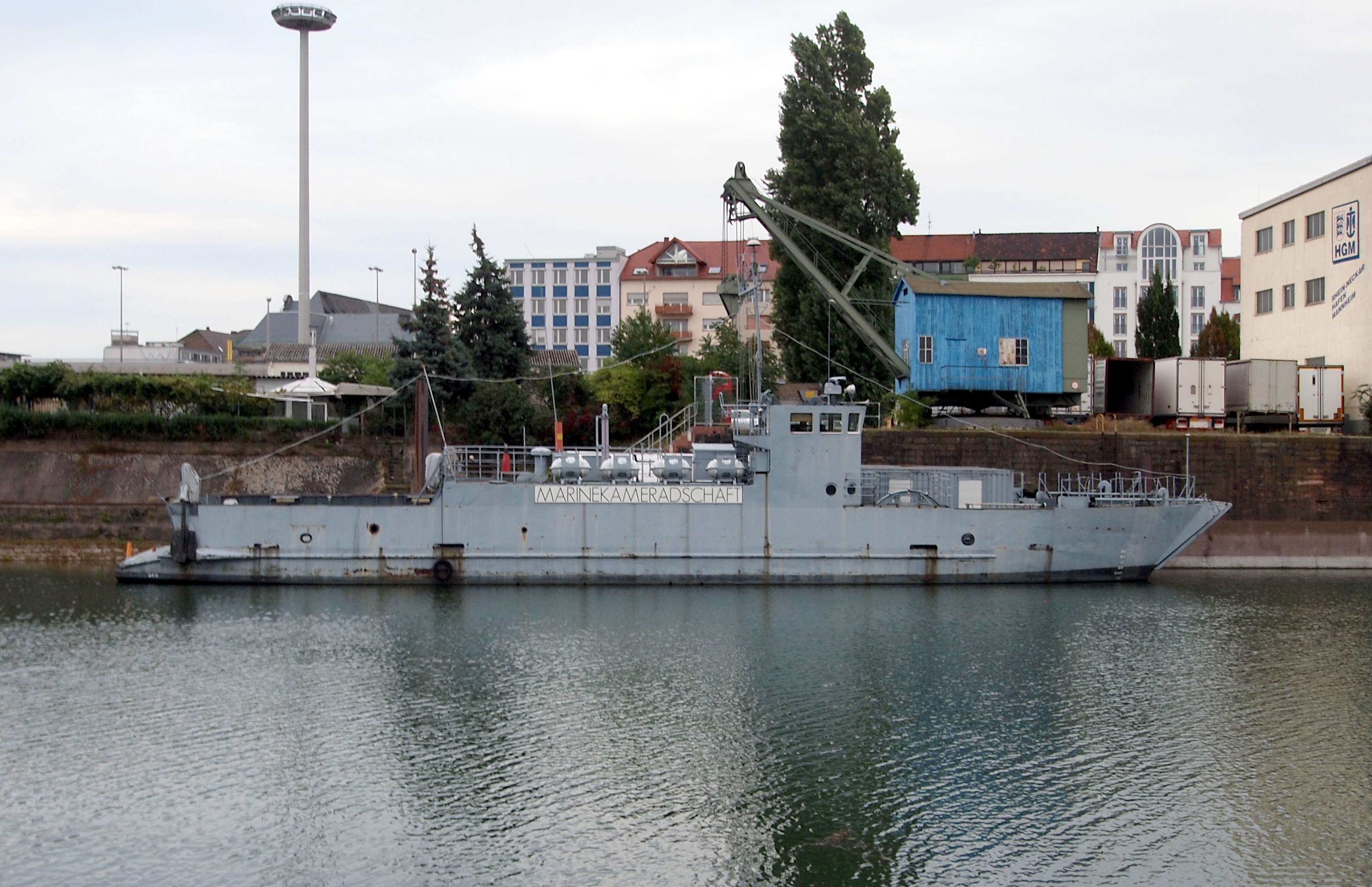
Zander 2013 in Mannheim Harbour

Barbe (barbel), Brasse (bream), Butt (flounder), Dorsch (cod), Felchen (whitefish/Coregonus wartmanni), Forelle (trout), Karpfen (carp), Lachs (salmon), Makrele (mackerel), Rochen (stingray), Salm (salmon), Schlei (tench), Stör (sturgeon), Wels (catfish), and Zander (zander).

== See also ==
Equivalent landing craft of the same era

- L 9609 class
