= Mughal people =

Ethnic group in South Asia

Mughal
مغل، مرزا،بیگ
- 4.4 million Pakistan
- 1.2 million India
- 600,000 Bangladesh

Languages
- Urdu, Punjabi, Bangla; Persian (formerly), Sindhi, Pashto

Religion
- Sunni Islam; Ahmadiyya; Shia Islam

Related ethnic groups
- Indian people, Bangladeshi people, Punjabi Muslims, Sindhis

The Mughal people or Mughals are a Muslim ethnic group of Turco-Mongol origin South Asia, primarily in Bangladesh, India and Pakistan. They are descended from the Turkic-Mongol Barlas tribe and historically settled in the Indian subcontinent during the Mughal Empire and mixed with the native Indian population. In parts of Punjab, some families traditionally associated with the Tarkhan community use surnames or social names such as Mughal, Mirza or Baig in modern times; however, these names do not necessarily indicate a common genealogical origin.

== Etymology ==
The term Mughal literally means Mongol.

== Mughal, Mirza and Tarkhan identities ==
In South Asia, the terms Mughal and Mirza have been used in different historical and regional contexts. The term Mughal is associated with communities claiming or tracing descent from Central Asian Turkic and Mongol groups, particularly the Barlas and other groups associated with the Mughal period. In India, some Mughal families use Mirza as a surname or honorific. The usage of these terms varies by region and family and does not necessarily indicate a single uniform social or genealogical identity.

The term Tarkhan has a punjabi name of Mughal, Mirza in South Asia. In the Punjab region, Tarkhan is associated with a distinct caste traditionally connected with carpentry and related occupations. Tarkhan was also used historically as a title or dynastic name, including by the Tarkhan caste of Sindh, whose rulers included individuals styled as Mirza. The historical use of the title Mirza among Tarkhan rulers should therefore not be taken by itself as evidence that all Mughals or Mirzas belonged to the Tarkhan caste.

== History ==
=== Pakistan ===
In Pakistan, Mughal people are mostly settled in the region of Azad Kashmir, and in the provinces of Punjab and Khyber Pakhtunkhwa. In India, the Mughals commonly use "Mirza" as their surname. They are also sometimes referred to as Chughtais or Chagatai Turks named after Chagatai Turkic language spoken by the Barlas and other Central Asian tribes.

=== India ===
In Uttar Pradesh, the Sambhal, who claim Turkic descent, identify as a Biradari, literally translating to "brotherhood", which is the word used for a social unit based on kinship such as tribe or clan. The chief of the Biradari is the Sardar, who is usually an elder man annually elected as the greatest man in the Biradari. Decisions on important matters are taken only after consulting the Biradari, and once taken binding on every member. In Gujarat, the community had traditionally served as soldiers in the armies of the various Indo-Muslim dynasties which ruled the Indian subcontinent. They were and still are a community of small to medium-sized farmers. A good many are also traders. Like other Gujarati Muslims, they have a caste association known as the Jamat, which acts both as a welfare organisation and an instrument of social control. In North India, the term Mughal refers as Gürkani or Timurids.

== Notable people ==
- U Thant
- Mirza Aslam Beg

== See also ==
- Turco-Mongol tradition
- Gurkani
- Changezi
- Qizilbash
