= Biduiyeh-ye Yek =

Biduiyeh-ye Yek بيدوييه 1
- Village
- Location within Iran
- Coordinates: 30°30′44″N 57°11′07″E
- Country: Iran
- Province: Kerman
- County: Kerman
- Bakhsh: Central
- Rural District: Derakhtengan

Population (2006)
  - Total: 44
- Time zone: UTC+3:30 (IRST)
  - Summer (DST): UTC+4:30 (IRDT)

Biduiyeh-ye Yek (Persian: بيدوييه 1, also Romanized as Bīdū’īyeh-e Yek; also known as Bīdū’īyeh and Bīdūyeh) is a village in Derakhtengan Rural District, in the Central District of Kerman County, Kerman Province, Iran. At the 2006 census, its population was 44, in 17 families.
