= Dashtuiyeh, Fahraj =

Dashtuiyeh دشتوييه
- Village
- Location within Iran
- Coordinates: 28°48′48″N 58°50′59″E
- Country: Iran
- Province: Kerman
- County: Fahraj
- Bakhsh: Central
- Rural District: Borj-e Akram

Population (2006)
  - Total: 684
- Time zone: UTC+3:30 (IRST)
  - Summer (DST): UTC+4:30 (IRDT)

Dashtuiyeh (Persian: دشتوييه, also Romanized as Dashtū’īyeh and Dashtoo’eyeh; also known as Dashtū and Borj-e Dashtū) is a village in Borj-e Akram Rural District, in the Central District of Fahraj County, Kerman Province, Iran. At the 2006 census, its population was 684, in 136 families.
