= Gach (surname) =

Gach is a surname with multiple origins. Notable people with the surname include:

- Gary Gach (born 1947), American author, translator, and poet
- J. R. Gach (1952–2015), American talk radio host
- Jiří Gach (born 1969), Czech sports shooter
- Kacper Gach (born 1998), Polish footballer
- Richard Gach (1930–1991), Austrian architect
