= Sar Mowr, Zarand =

Sar Mowr سرمور
- Village
- Location within Iran
- Coordinates: 30°35′42″N 56°22′43″E
- Country: Iran
- Province: Kerman
- County: Zarand
- Bakhsh: Central
- Rural District: Jorjafak

Population (2006)
  - Total: 27
- Time zone: UTC+3:30 (IRST)
  - Summer (DST): UTC+4:30 (IRDT)

Sar Mowr (Persian: سرمور) is a village in Jorjafak Rural District, in the Central District of Zarand County, Kerman Province, Iran. At the 2006 census, its population was 27, in 8 families.
