= Genuiyeh, Kiskan =

Genuiyeh گنوييه
- Village
- Location within Iran
- Coordinates: 29°22′42″N 56°40′30″E
- Country: Iran
- Province: Kerman
- County: Baft
- Bakhsh: Central
- Rural District: Kiskan

Population (2006)
  - Total: 212
- Time zone: UTC+3:30 (IRST)
  - Summer (DST): UTC+4:30 (IRDT)

Genuiyeh (Persian: گنوييه, also Romanized as Genū’īyeh, Ganū’īyeh, and Gonū’īyeh; also known as Gūnū’īyeh, Gūtū’īyeh, and Kanū’īyeh) is a village in Kiskan Rural District, in the Central District of Baft County, Kerman Province, Iran. At the 2006 census, its population was 212, in 63 families.
