= Sar Mur-e Kukhdan =

Sar Mur-e Kukhdan سرموركوخدان
- Village
- Location within Iran
- Coordinates: 30°50′00″N 51°29′00″E
- Country: Iran
- Province: Kohgiluyeh and Boyer-Ahmad
- County: Dana
- Bakhsh: Central
- Rural District: Dana

Population (2006)
  - Total: 113
- Time zone: UTC+3:30 (IRST)
  - Summer (DST): UTC+4:30 (IRDT)

Sar Mur-e Kukhdan (Persian: سرموركوخدان, also Romanized as Sar Mūr-e Kūkhdān; also known as Sar Mūr) is a village in Dana Rural District, in the Central District of Dana County, Kohgiluyeh and Boyer-Ahmad Province, Iran. At the 2006 census, its population was 113, in 23 families.
