= Biduiyeh-ye Kajin =

Biduiyeh-ye Kajin بيدوئيه كجين
- Village
- Location within Iran
- Coordinates: 28°09′47″N 56°44′06″E
- Country: Iran
- Province: Hormozgan
- County: Hajjiabad
- Bakhsh: Ahmadi
- Rural District: Kuh Shah

Population (2006)
  - Total: 100
- Time zone: UTC+3:30 (IRST)
  - Summer (DST): UTC+4:30 (IRDT)

Biduiyeh-ye Kajin (Persian: بيدوئيه كجين, also Romanized as Bīdū’īyeh-ye Kajīn; also known as Bīdū’īyeh) is a village in Kuh Shah Rural District, Ahmadi District, Hajjiabad County, Hormozgan Province, Iran. At the 2006 census, its population was 100, in 19 families.
