= Shahzadeh Mohammad, Boyer-Ahmad =

Shahzadeh Mohammad شاهزاده محمد
- Village
- Location within Iran
- Coordinates: 30°37′26″N 51°48′05″E
- Country: Iran
- Province: Kohgiluyeh and Boyer-Ahmad
- County: Boyer-Ahmad
- Bakhsh: Central
- Rural District: Kakan

Population (2006)
  - Total: 24
- Time zone: UTC+3:30 (IRST)
  - Summer (DST): UTC+4:30 (IRDT)

Shahzadeh Mohammad (Persian: شاهزاده محمد, also Romanized as Shāhzādeh Moḩammad) is a village in Kakan Rural District, in the Central District of Boyer-Ahmad County, Kohgiluyeh and Boyer-Ahmad Province, Iran. At the 2006 census, its population was 24, in 6 families.
