= Karig =

Karig كاريگ
- Village
- Location within Iran
- Coordinates: 30°24′05″N 55°11′41″E
- Country: Iran
- Province: Kerman
- County: Shahr-e Babak
- Bakhsh: Central
- Rural District: Madvarat

Population (2006)
  - Total: 15
- Time zone: UTC+3:30 (IRST)
  - Summer (DST): UTC+4:30 (IRDT)

Karig (Persian: كاريگ, also Romanized as Kārīg; also known as Gārīk) is a village in Madvarat Rural District, in the Central District of Shahr-e Babak County, Kerman Province, Iran. As of 2019, Karig has been uninhabited.
