= Tikdar-e Pay Sang =

Tikdar-e Pay Sang تيكدرپاي سنگ
- Village
- Location within Iran
- Coordinates: 30°34′39″N 57°18′17″E
- Country: Iran
- Province: Kerman
- County: Kerman
- Bakhsh: Central
- Rural District: Derakhtengan

Population (2006)
  - Total: 86
- Time zone: UTC+3:30 (IRST)
  - Summer (DST): UTC+4:30 (IRDT)

Tikdar-e Pay Sang (Persian: تيكدرپاي سنگ, also Romanized as Tīkdar-e Pāy Sang; also known as Nīk Darpāy-e Sang, Tīgdar-e Pāy Sang, Tīkdar Bāb Sang, and Tīkdar-e Bāb Sang) is a village in Derakhtengan Rural District, in the Central District of Kerman County, Kerman Province, Iran. At the 2006 census, its population was 86, in 24 families.
