= Dashtuiyeh, Hormozgan =

Dashtuiyeh دشتوييه
- Village
- Location within Iran
- Coordinates: 28°28′11″N 55°33′58″E
- Country: Iran
- Province: Hormozgan
- County: Hajjiabad
- Bakhsh: Central
- Rural District: Dar Agah

Population (2006)
  - Total: 86
- Time zone: UTC+3:30 (IRST)
  - Summer (DST): UTC+4:30 (IRDT)

Dashtuiyeh (Persian: دشتوييه, also Romanized as Dashtū’īyeh; also known as Dashtū) is a village in Dar Agah Rural District, in the Central District of Hajjiabad County, Hormozgan Province, Iran. At the 2006 census, its population was 86, in 26 families.
