= Sar Mur, Fars =

Sar Mur سرمور
- Village
- Location within Iran
- Coordinates: 29°41′58″N 52°10′08″E
- Country: Iran
- Province: Fars
- County: Shiraz
- Bakhsh: Arzhan
- Rural District: Qarah Chaman

Population (2006)
  - Total: 214
- Time zone: UTC+3:30 (IRST)
  - Summer (DST): UTC+4:30 (IRDT)

Sar Mur (Persian: سرمور, also Romanized as Sar Mūr, Sar Mowr, and Sarmūr) is a village in Qarah Chaman Rural District, Arzhan District, Shiraz County, Fars province, Iran. At the 2006 census, its population was 214, in 37 families.
