= Hiurud =

Hiurud هيورود
- Village
- Location within Iran
- Coordinates: 34°18′39″N 46°26′46″E
- Country: Iran
- Province: Kermanshah
- County: Dalahu
- Bakhsh: Gahvareh
- Rural District: Gurani

Population (2006)
  - Total: 83
- Time zone: UTC+3:30 (IRST)
  - Summer (DST): UTC+4:30 (IRDT)

Hiurud (Persian: هيورود, also Romanized as Hīūrūd; also known as Havehrū, Hīrūd, Hūāru, Hūharū, Hūrū, Hūvarū, Hūvehrū, and Huvehrū) is a village in Gurani Rural District, Gahvareh District, Dalahu County, Kermanshah Province, Iran. At the 2006 census, its population was 83, in 17 families.
