= Taraz, Narmashir =

Taraz طرز
- Village
- Location within Iran
- Coordinates: 28°46′54″N 58°31′03″E
- Country: Iran
- Province: Kerman
- County: Narmashir
- Bakhsh: Rud Ab
- Rural District: Rud Ab-e Gharbi

Population (2006)
  - Total: 1,737
- Time zone: UTC+3:30 (IRST)
  - Summer (DST): UTC+4:30 (IRDT)

Taraz (Persian: طرز, also Romanized as Ţaraz) is a village in Rud Ab-e Gharbi Rural District, Rud Ab District, Narmashir County, Kerman Province, Iran. At the 2006 census, its population was 1,737, in 392 families.
