= Dehuj, Baft =

Dehuj دهوج
- Village
- Location within Iran
- Coordinates: 29°01′51″N 56°39′53″E
- Country: Iran
- Province: Kerman
- County: Baft
- Bakhsh: Central
- Rural District: Dashtab

Population (2006)
  - Total: 165
- Time zone: UTC+3:30 (IRST)
  - Summer (DST): UTC+4:30 (IRDT)

Dehuj (Persian: دهوج, also Romanized as Dehūj) is a village in Dashtab Rural District, in the Central District of Baft County, Kerman Province, Iran. At the 2006 census, its population was 165, in 44 families.
