= Gurkani =

Gurkani or Gurkaniya (Persian: گورکانیان, Gūrkāniyān) may refer to:

- The Timurid dynasty or Timurids, the ruling family of the Timurid Empire and the Mughal Empire, who called themselves Gurkani or Gurkaniya. "Gurkani" means "son-in-law" (of Genghis Khan). The nomenclature "Mughal Empire" is of English origin and not the name by which the empire was known as then.
  - The Timurid Empire, which referred to itself as the Gurkaniya or Gurkani.
  - The Mughal Empire, the Indian successor state to the Timurid Empire, which also referred to itself as the Saltanat e Gurkaniya or Saltanat e Mughaliya.
- Gurkani, Iran, a village in Kerman Province, Iran
- Gur-e-Amir, the grave and mausoleum of Timur, who founded the Saltanat e Gurkaniya or Timurid Empire
