= Ravar Rural District =

Rural district in Kerman province, Iran

Ravar Rural District Persian: دهستان راور
- Rural District
- Location within Iran
- Coordinates: 31°25′08″N 57°04′57″E
- Country: Iran
- Province: Kerman
- County: Ravar
- District: Central
- Capital: Deh-e Ali

Population (2016)
  - Total: 10,103
- Time zone: UTC+3:30 (IRST)

Ravar Rural District (Persian: دهستان راور) is in the Central District of Ravar County, Kerman province, Iran. Its capital is the village of Deh-e Ali.

== Demographics ==
=== Population ===
At the time of the 2006 National Census, the rural district's population was 8,230 in 2,357 households. There were 11,966 inhabitants in 3,702 households at the following census of 2011. The 2016 census measured the population of the rural district as 10,103 in 3,137 households. The most populous of its 117 villages was Feyzabad, with 1,415 people.
