= Central District (Ravar County) =

District in Kerman province, Iran

Central District (Ravar County) Persian: بخش مرکزی شهرستان راور
- District
- Location within Iran
- Coordinates: 31°25′08″N 57°04′57″E
- Country: Iran
- Province: Kerman
- County: Ravar
- Capital: Ravar

Population (2016)
  - Total: 32,832
- Time zone: UTC+3:30 (IRST)

The Central District of Ravar County (Persian: بخش مرکزی شهرستان راور) is in Kerman province, Iran. Its capital is the city of Ravar.

== Demographics ==
=== Population ===
At the time of the 2006 National Census, the district's population was 31,140 in 8,278 households. The following census in 2011 counted 33,867 people in 9,962 households. The 2016 census measured the population of the district as 32,832 inhabitants in 10,011 households.

=== Administrative divisions ===
Central District (Ravar County) Population
Administrative Divisions	2006	2011	2016
Ravar RD	8,230	11,966	10,103
Ravar (city)	22,910	21,901	22,729
Total	31,140	33,867	32,832
RD = Rural District
