= Heruz Rural District =

Rural district in Kerman province, Iran

Heruz Rural District Persian: دهستان هروز
- Rural District
- Location within Iran
- Coordinates: 31°09′45″N 57°17′09″E
- Country: Iran
- Province: Kerman
- County: Ravar
- District: Kuhsaran
- Capital: Hojedk

Population (2016)
  - Total: 5,102
- Time zone: UTC+3:30 (IRST)

Heruz Rural District (Persian: دهستان هروز) is in Kuhsaran District of Ravar County, Kerman province, Iran. It is administered from the city of Hojedk.

== Demographics ==
=== Population ===
At the time of the 2006 National Census, the rural district's population was 3,436 in 938 households. There were 2,859 inhabitants in 918 households at the following census of 2011. The 2016 census measured the population of the rural district as 5,102 in 1,642 households. The most populous of its 73 villages was Heruz-e Sofla, with 416 people.
