= Horjand Rural District =

Rural district in Kerman province, Iran

Horjand Rural District Persian: دهستان حرجند
- Rural District
- Location within Iran
- Coordinates: 30°54′27″N 57°24′41″E
- Country: Iran
- Province: Kerman
- County: Ravar
- District: Kuhsaran
- Capital: Horjand

Population (2016)
  - Total: 4,257
- Time zone: UTC+3:30 (IRST)

Horjand Rural District (Persian: دهستان حرجند) is in Kuhsaran District of Ravar County, Kerman province, Iran. Its capital is the village of Horjand.

== Demographics ==
=== Population ===
At the time of the 2006 National Census, the rural district's population was 3,025 in 788 households. There were 2,819 inhabitants in 873 households at the following census of 2011. The 2016 census measured the population of the rural district as 4,257 in 1,315 households. The most populous of its 45 villages was Horjand, with 784 people.
