= Kuhsaran District =

District in Kerman province, Iran

Kuhsaran District Persian: بخش کوهساران
- District
- Location within Iran
- Coordinates: 31°07′37″N 57°17′09″E
- Country: Iran
- Province: Kerman
- County: Ravar
- Capital: Hojedk

Population (2016)
  - Total: 10,366
- Time zone: UTC+3:30 (IRST)

Kuhsaran District (Persian: بخش کوهساران) is in Ravar County, Kerman province, Iran. Its capital is the city of Hojedk.

== Demographics ==
=== Population ===
At the time of the 2006 National Census, the district's population was 7,399 in 1,958 households. The following census in 2011 counted 6,428 people in 2,009 households. The 2016 census measured the population of the district as 10,366 inhabitants in 3,270 households.

=== Administrative divisions ===
Kuhsaran District Population
Administrative Divisions	2006	2011	2016
Heruz RD	3,436	2,859	5,102
Horjand RD	3,025	2,819	4,257
Hojedk (city)	938	750	1,007
Total	7,399	6,428	10,366
RD = Rural District
