= Ravar County =

County in Kerman province, Iran

Ravar County Persian: شهرستان راور
- County
- Location of Ravar County in Kerman province (top, pink)

- Location of Kerman province in Iran
- Coordinates: 31°16′N 57°07′E
- Country: Iran
- Province: Kerman
- Capital: Ravar
- Districts: Central, Kuhsaran

Population (2016)
  - Total: 43,198
- Time zone: UTC+3:30 (IRST)

Ravar County (Persian: شهرستان راور) (Note: Also Romanized as Rāvar) is in Kerman province, Iran. Its capital is the city of Ravar.

== Demographics ==
=== Population ===
At the time of the 2006 National Census, the county's population was 38,539 in 10,236 households. The following census in 2011 counted 40,295 people in 11,951 households. The 2016 census measured the population of the county as 43,198, in 13,281 households.

=== Administrative divisions ===
Ravar County's population history and administrative structure over three consecutive censuses are shown in the following table.

Ravar County Population
Administrative Divisions	2006	2011	2016
Central District	31,140	33,867	32,832
Ravar RD	8,230	11,966	10,103
Ravar (city)	22,910	21,901	22,729
Kuhsaran District	7,399	6,428	10,366
Heruz RD	3,436	2,859	5,102
Horjand RD	3,025	2,819	4,257
Hojedk (city)	938	750	1,007
Total	38,539	40,295	43,198
RD = Rural District

== Geography ==
Ravar is the northernmost county of Kerman province. It lies on the border of the large desert area of South Khorasan province, called the Loot Desert (Dasht-e Lut, or "Emptiness Plain").

== Economy ==
Carpet-weaving, a very old tradition in Ravar, is one of the main industries of the county. The carpets produced in the city are internationally renowned.

== See also ==
Media related to Ravar County at Wikimedia Commons
