= Heligoland (disambiguation) =

Heligoland (Helgoland) is a German island in the North Sea.

Heligoland or Helgoland may also refer to:

== Books ==
- Helgoland (book), a 2020 popular book by the physicist Carlo Rovelli
- Heligoland (novel), a 2003 novel by Shena Mackay

== Music ==
- Heligoland (band), a five-piece independent band from Melbourne, Australia
- Heligoland (album), a 2010 album by British trip-hop band Massive Attack
- Helgoland (Bruckner), a work for male chorus and orchestra by Anton Bruckner
- Tim Friese-Greene or Heligoland, musician and producer

== Ships ==
- KMD Helgoland, a Danish ironclad.
- MV Helgoland, used as a hospital ship in the Vietnam War from 1966 to 1971
- SMS Helgoland (1909), a Dreadnought-type battleship of the Kaiserliche Marine launched in 1909
  - Helgoland-class battleship, a class of German dreadnought battleships
- SMS Helgoland (1912), an Austro-Hungarian cruiser that sank the Monge captained by Roland Morillot
- SS Helgoland, a whaler requisitioned by the Kriegsmarine during the Second World War
- Helgoland A720, lead ship of the Helgoland class of German tugs

== Other uses ==
- Heligoland Bight, a bay forming part of the German Bight in the North Sea
- 'Helgoland' underwater laboratory (UWL) is an underwater habitat.
- Heligoland trap, for trapping wild birds
- Heligoland–Zanzibar Treaty
- Lager Helgoland, a Nazi Germany-era labour camp on Alderney.
