= China–Denmark relations =

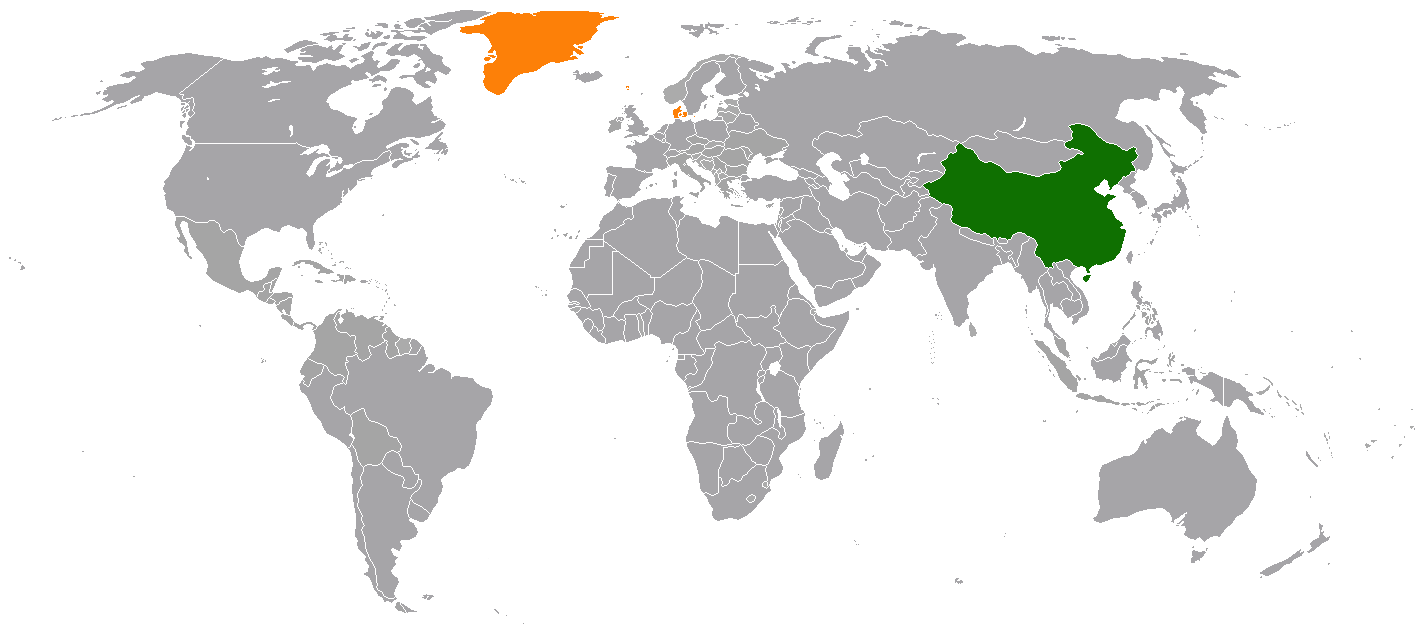
- China: Denmark

Denmark recognized the People's Republic of China (PRC) on January 9, 1950, and the two countries established diplomatic relations on May 11, 1950. On February 15, 1956, the two countries upgraded diplomatic relations from ministerial to ambassadorial level and exchanged ambassadors. China has an embassy in Copenhagen. Denmark has an embassy in Beijing and 3 general consulates in Guangzhou, Hong Kong and Shanghai.

== History ==
In 1870, The Great Northern Telegraph Company sent three cable ships and the frigate Tordenskjold to Hong Kong and Shanghai to lay underwater telegraph cables. In 1899 and 1900, the Danish cruiser Valkyrien visited Qing China with Prince Valdemar of Denmark aboard.

In 1950, Denmark became the second western country to recognize the People's Republic of China.

Since 2000, the most important area of cooperation between China and Denmark has been energy, with a particular focus on renewable energy like wind power. Denmark describes Sino-Danish energy cooperation as the "crown jewel" of its broader energy partnership program. At the end of 2005, the two countries launched the Sino-Danish Wind Energy Program to help China learn from the Danish wind power experience in areas including the development of advanced wind power technology, wind resource assessment, and personnel training. The program lasted until 2010, providing important assistance to China at a time when its wind power capacity was doubling every two years (2006–2009). China and Denmark launched the Renewable Energy Development program in 2008 with the goals of developing capacity and technological innovation in China. The Danish government also supported the creation of the China National Renewable Energy Center (CNREC), which as of 2023 is the Danish government's most important initiative in China. Although is a China-led center, Denmark directly supports its operations and leadership, including via a seat on CNREC's advisory committee. In November 2024, Denmark's Minister of Climate, Energy and Utilities Lars Aagaard referred to Chinese wind turbine manufacturers as a "threat" and said that the government has tools that ensure that its largest offshore wind tender to date goes to "someone we can trust."

In 2023, Chinese firm Huawei was accused of espionage against Danish telecom group TDC Holding A/S during a 5G network contract bid.

In November 2024, the Royal Danish Navy monitored a Chinese shipping vessel, the Yi Peng 3, in the Baltic Sea after it was found be in the vicinity of two severed undersea fiber-optic data cables and suspected of sabotage.

In March 2025, Denmark's Centre for Cyber Security (CFCS) stated that the Danish telecom sector was being actively targeted by state-backed hackers from China.

=== Human rights concerns ===
==== Dalai Lama ====
China suspended ties with Denmark after its Prime Minister met the Dalai Lama and resumed them only after the Danish government issued a statement in December 2009 saying it would oppose Tibetan independence and consider Beijing's reaction before inviting him again.

==== Hong Kong ====
In June 2020, Denmark openly opposed the Hong Kong national security law.

==== Uyghurs ====
In January 2022, Denmark announced a diplomatic boycott of the 2022 Winter Olympics due to concerns about the Chinese government's human rights abuses of Uyghurs. In May 2025, Danish political parties Red–Green Alliance, Danish People's Party, The Alternative called for an investigation into transnational repression against Uyghurs and Tibetans living in Denmark.

== Greenland ==
In 2018, the China Communications Construction responded to a request for proposals from the Government of Greenland for the construction and operation of three airports in Nuuk, Ilulissat and Qaqortoq. The government of Denmark objected to the bid, citing security objections.

Although Chinese investment was once significant, Beijing's economic presence in Greenland is now very limited. China officially supports state sovereignty and rejects claims that it poses a security threat in Greenland.

== See also ==
- Foreign relations of China
- Foreign relations of Denmark
