= HDMS Iver Hvitfeldt (1886) =

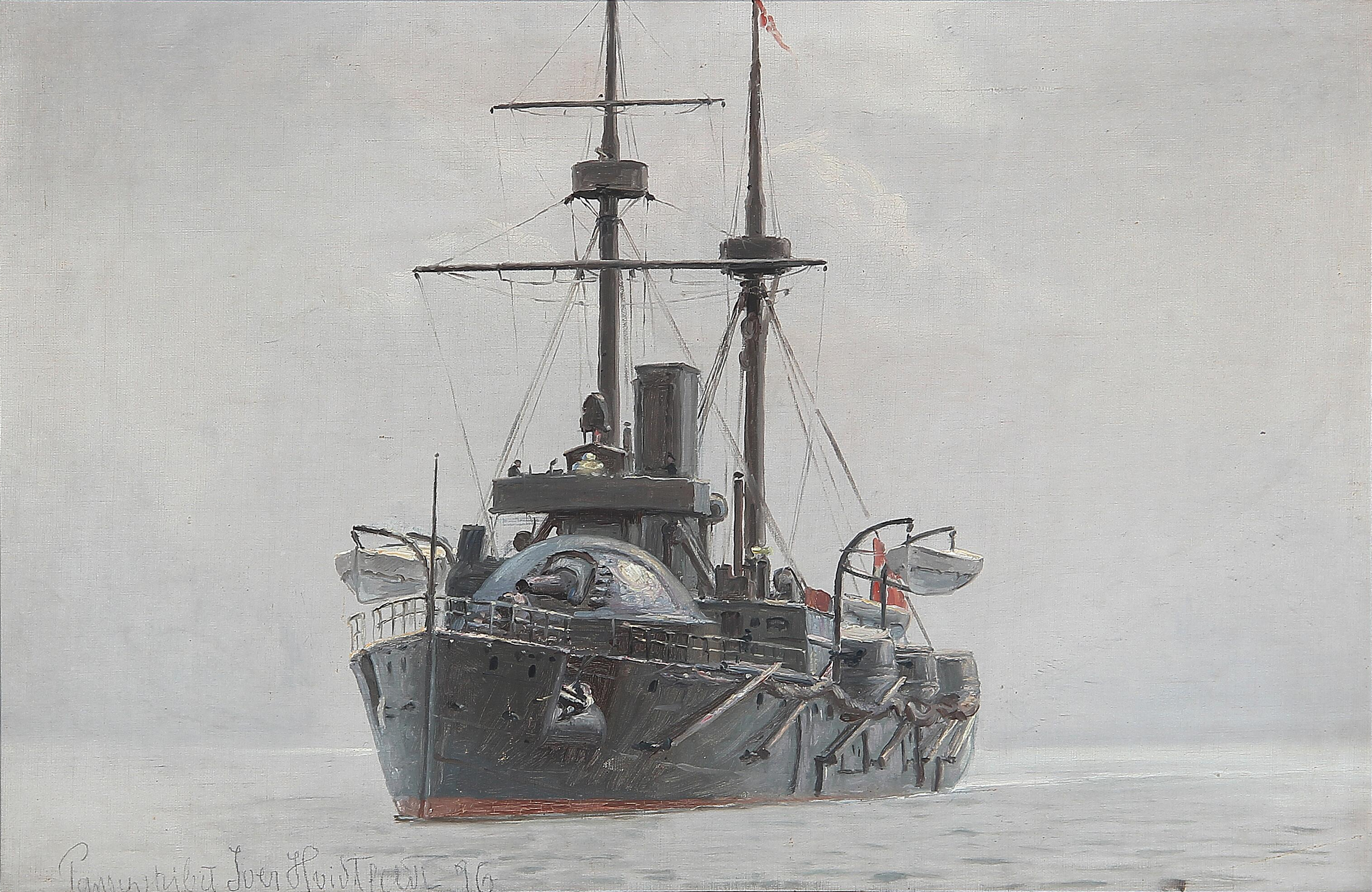
- Oil painting of Iver Hvitfeldt

History

Denmark
- Name: Iver Hvitfeldt
- Builder: Orlogsværftet
- Laid down: 9 April 1884
- Launched: 14 April 1886
- Commissioned: 1 June 1887
- Stricken: 26 February 1919
- Fate: Broken up

General characteristics
- Displacement: 3,392 long tons (3,446 t)
- Length: 74 m (242 ft 9 in) pp
- Beam: 15.11 m (49 ft 7 in)
- Draft: 5.59 m (18 ft 4 in)
- Installed power: 5,100 indicated horsepower (3,800 kW)
- Speed: 15.25 knots (28.24 km/h; 17.55 mph)
- Complement: 277
- Armament: 2 × 260 mm (10.2 in) guns; 4 × 120 mm (4.7 in) guns; 2 × 57 mm (2.2 in) L/44 Hotchkiss guns; 8 × Hotchkiss revolver cannon; 2 × 381 mm (15 in) torpedo tubes; 2 × 356 mm (14 in) torpedo tubes
- Armor: Belt armor: 180 to 290 mm (7 to 11.5 in); Barbettes: 220 mm (8.5 in)

HDMS Iver Hvitfeldt was a coastal defense ship built for the Royal Danish Navy in the 1880s. She was the only member of her class. As she was intended to serve as part of the defense of Copenhagen, she was fairly small, but was heavily armed and armored for her size. She was armed with a main battery of two 260 mm (10.2 in) guns in individual barbette mounts, one forward and aft. Iver Hvitfeldt had a relatively uneventful career, taking part in routine training exercises in the 1890s and early 1900s. She occasionally made visits to other countries in northern Europe during this period. She caught fire in 1904 and was badly burned, but was repaired and modernized thereafter. She remained in the Danish fleet's inventory until 1919, albeit in reserve during World War I, through which Denmark remained neutral. She was briefly used as a barracks ship in 1918 before being sold for scrap in 1919 and broken up in the Netherlands later that year.

== Design ==
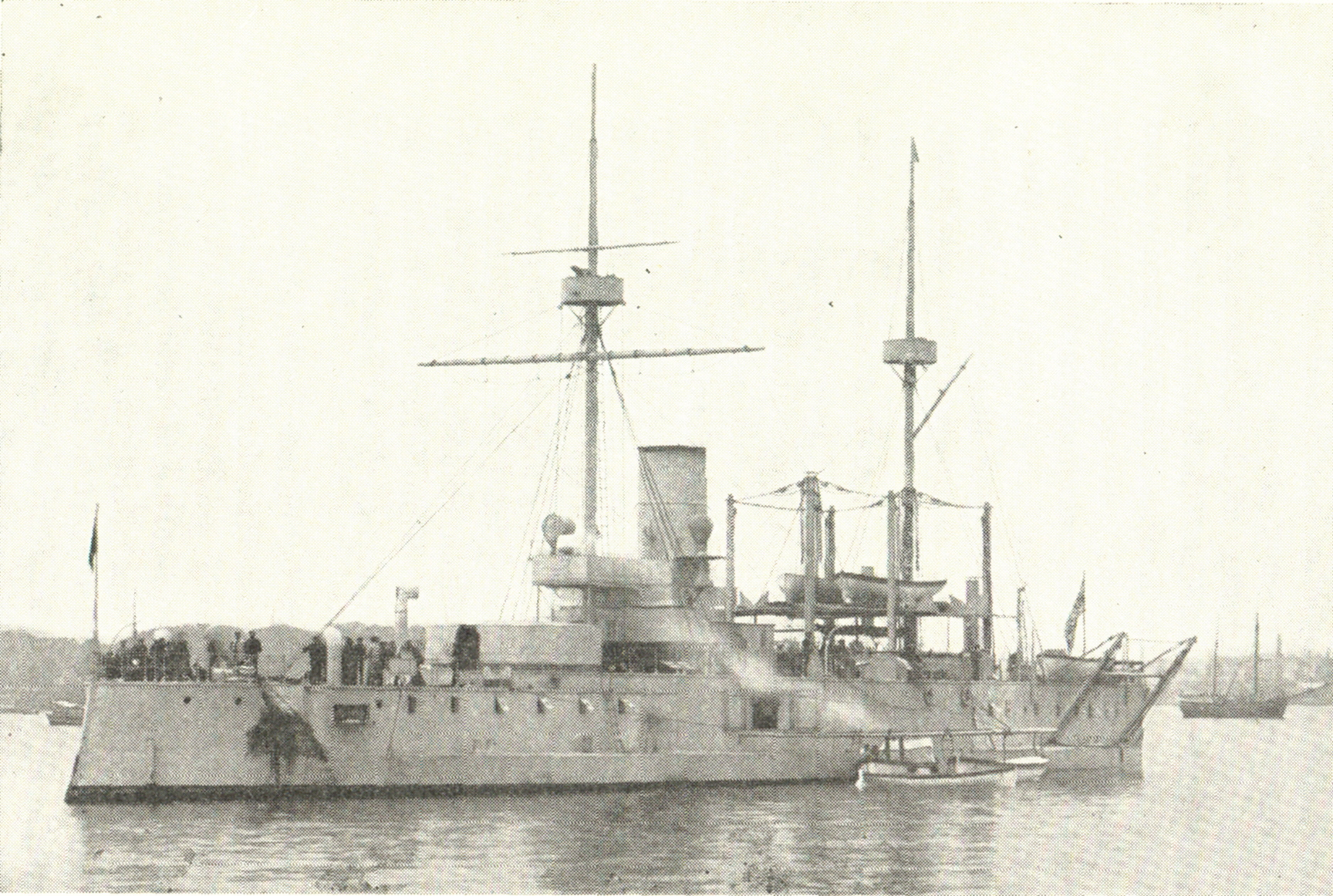
HDMS Helgoland, which provided the basis for the design

By the end of the 19th century, which had seen Denmark's decline from a major navy before the devastating Battle of Copenhagen in 1801 to a minor coastal defense force by the 1890s, the Royal Danish Navy was primarily concerned with countering the naval strength of its neighbor, Imperial Germany. Between the 1860s and 1870s, Denmark had purchased or built a total of eight ironclad warships, which were predominantly coastal defense ships. These were employed in an integrated coastal defense network for the island of Zealand, where the capital at Copenhagen lay. The naval law passed in May 1880 set the fleet's strength at eight ironclads; four cruisers; ten smaller corvettes, schooners, or gunboats; twelve ironclad gunboats; and thirty torpedo boats.

In 1880, the navy's designers at the Orlogsværftet began work on a proposal for a new coastal defense ship to replace one of the oldest ironclads; this new vessel was based on the coastal defense ship Helgoland. But the limited Danish naval budget prevented building the ship, as the funds available for construction were directed toward the new unprotected cruiser Fyen. As a result, the design for the new coastal defense ship was not approved by the naval minister until 27 June 1883. The new vessel, which was named Iver Hvitfeldt, incorporated elements from foreign designs.

The design staff grappled with the problem of strengthening the armor to defeat contemporary armor-piercing shells, balanced against carrying an effective armament and retaining a useful top speed, while trying to keep displacement within reason. As a weight-saving measure, they abandoned the attempt for a full waterline belt and instead only armored the central section, relying on a thinner, curved armor deck to protect the bow and stern. The central citadel would retain enough buoyancy to keep the ship afloat even if the bow and stern were flooded; this principle was borrowed from British ironclads in service at the time.

=== Characteristics ===
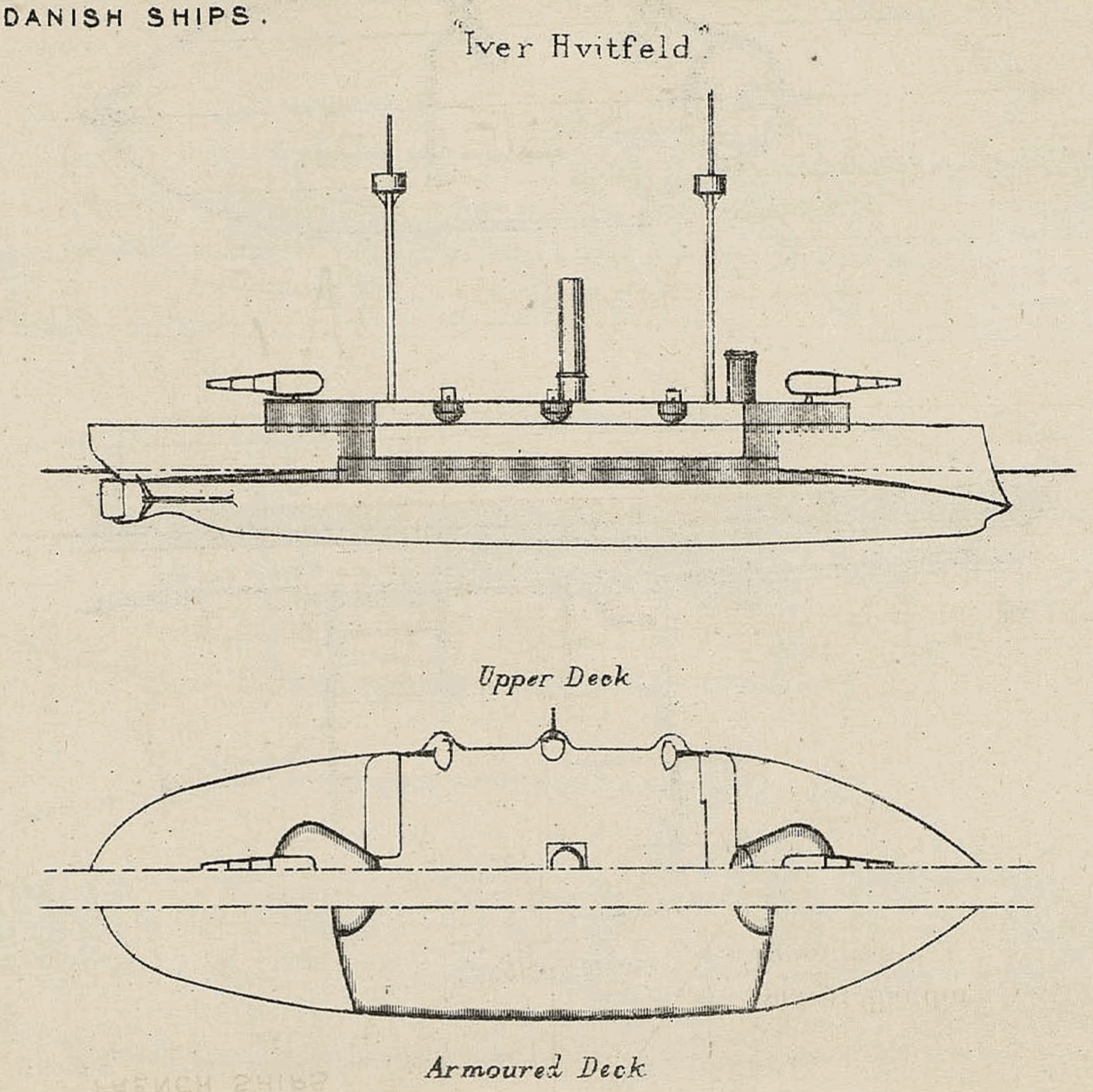
Plan and profile of Iver Hvitfeldt, which incorrectly shows six secondary guns instead of four; the center positions actually carried much smaller 57 mm (2.2 in) guns

Iver Hvitfeldt had a steel hull, which was 74 m (242 ft 9 in) long between perpendiculars. It had a beam of 15.11 m (49 ft 7 in) and a maximum draft of 5.59 m (18 ft 4 in). She displaced 3,392 long tons (3,446 t) as designed. Her crew amounted to 277 officers and enlisted men. The ship was completed with central heating and electric lights. She was fitted with six 400 mm (15.7 in) searchlights, two on the bridge above the conning tower; the rest were on the two pole masts or upper deck. The ship initially carried a pair of small torpedo boats, named Nr. 8 and Nr. 9, which were built by Thornycroft; these were lowered into the water by a steam winch and a large boom.

The ship's propulsion system consisted of a pair of two-cylinder, compound steam engines that drove a pair of screw propellers. The machinery was manufactured by the Danish shipyard Burmeister & Wain. Steam was provided by eight coal-fired boilers that were vented through a single funnel. The boilers were divided into four boiler rooms. Her engines were rated to produce 5,100 indicated horsepower (3,800 kW), for a top speed of 15.25 knots (28.24 km/h; 17.55 mph). She carried 290 long tons (290 t) of coal for her boilers. This enabled Iver Hvidfeldt to steam for 1,600 nautical miles (3,000 km; 1,800 mi) at a cruising speed of 9 knots (17 km/h; 10 mph).

=== Armament ===
The ship's main battery consisted of a pair of 260 mm (10.2 in) 35-caliber guns, which were manufactured by the German firm Krupp. The guns were mounted in rotating pear-shaped barbette mounts, one forward and one aft. The barbettes were fitted with thin steel hoods to protect the gun crews from shell fragments. The guns had a rate of fire of one shot every four minutes, and each gun was supplied with a total of 75 shells. Their maximum range was 9,500 m (31,200 ft). The guns were manually operated and loaded. The guns had an arc of fire of 248 degrees, and they could be trained at a rate of 90 degrees every 40 seconds; to traverse from one extreme to the other, it took a total of 110 seconds. (Note: For comparison, it took the gun crews of the earlier vessel Helgoland some six minutes and forty seconds to traverse their guns across a similar arc.)

These guns were supported by a secondary battery of four 120 mm (4.7 in) 30-caliber guns, each mounted in sponsons at the corners of the superstructure. The guns were fitted with light gun shields to protect the crews from anti-personnel fire. These guns had a range of 7,900 m (25,900 ft) and a rate of fire of one shot every ninety seconds. They were supplied with a total of 400 shells between them. Two 57 mm (2.2 in) L/44 Hotchkiss guns were placed in sponsons between the 120 mm guns; these had a range of 7,000 m (23,000 ft) and a rate of fire of ten shots per minute. Each gun was supplied with 300 shells. For close-range defense against torpedo boats, the ship was armed with eight 1-pounder Hotchkiss revolver cannon.

She also carried four torpedo tubes; two were 356 mm (14 in) and the other two were 381 mm (15 in). Both of these were the Whitehead torpedo type. The 381 mm tubes were in the bow and stern, while the 356 mm tubes were placed on each broadside. The bow tube was submerged, but the remainder were above-water tubes.

=== Armor ===
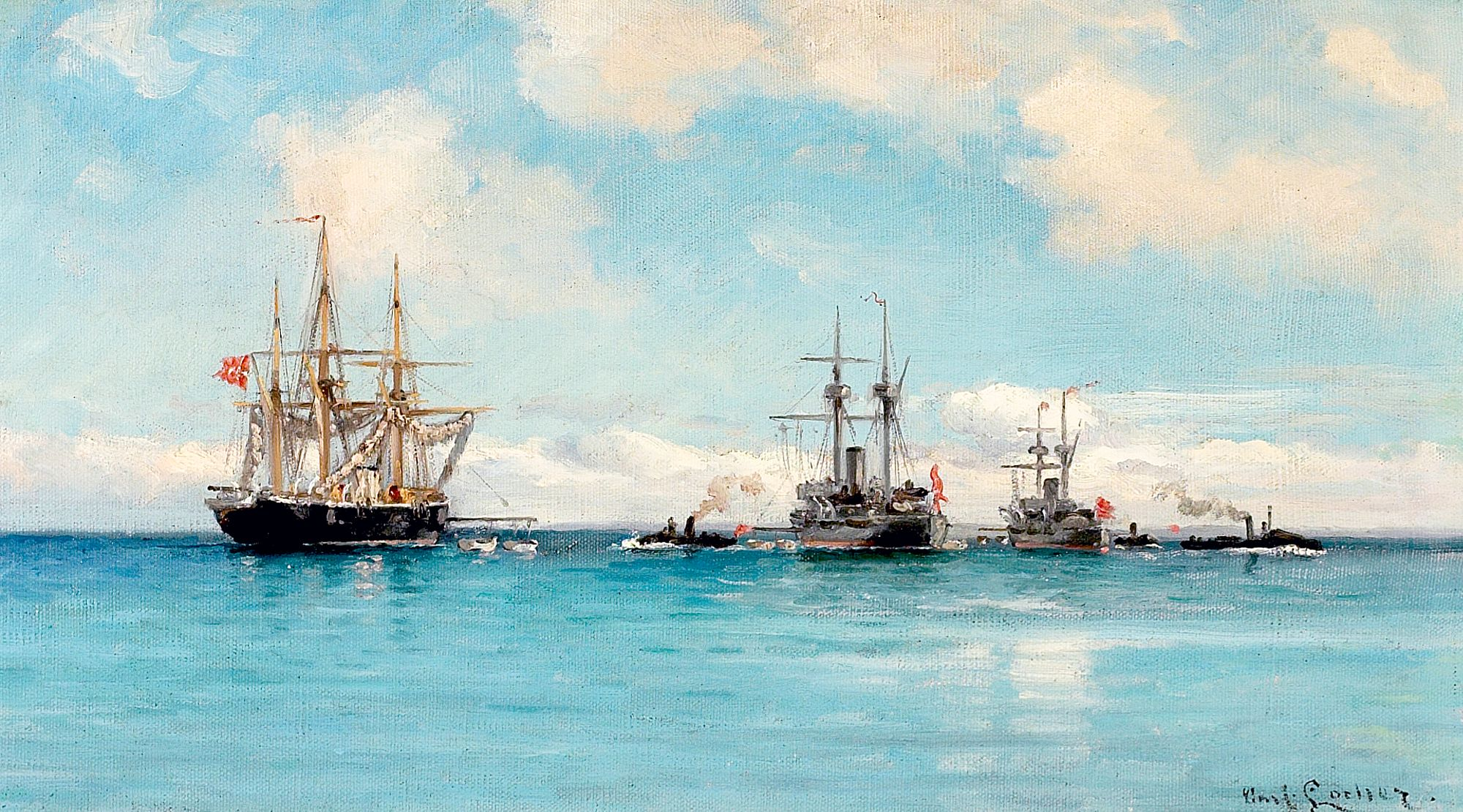
Painting of the training squadron of 1890, consisting of Iver Hvitfeldt (right), Valkyrien (center), and St Thomas (left)

Iver Hvitfeldt was protected with compound armor manufactured by Cammell Laird of Britain. Her belt armor was 292 mm (11.5 in) thick, though it only covered the central portion of her hull, accounting for about half the length of the ship. The belt was placed on 314 mm (12.4 in) of teak, behind which two 13 mm (0.51 in) layers of steel formed the inner skin of the hull. The belt covered a length of 50 m (164 ft), and was 6 ft 6 in (1.98 m) wide from top to bottom. The main portion of the belt extended from 0.4 m (1 ft 4 in) above the waterline to 0.6 m (2 ft 0 in) below; here, it was reduced in thickness half. This thinner section of belt extended another 0.78 m (2 ft 7 in) down the hull. At either end of the belt, a curved, armored bulkhead that was 240 mm (9.4 in) thick connected the two sides of the ship.

She was protected with an armor deck, composed of three different segments. The first covered the citadel and was 54 mm (2.1 in) thick; it was flat, and connected to the top edge of the belt. Forward and aft, a curved armor deck extended from the citadel below the waterline to provide a degree of protection to the bow and stern. The forward deck also sloped downward toward the bow to support the ram. The fore and aft decks were placed below the waterline, and the bow and stern were heavily subdivided into a total of 55 watertight compartments to reduce the effects of flooding due to damage. The main battery barbettes were protected with 216 mm (8.5 in) of armor plate, layered on top of teak planking, and then an inner liner of 11 mm (0.43 in) of steel armor. The steel hoods for the guns were 40 mm (1.6 in) thick. Her conning tower was protected with 115 mm (5 in) of compound armor layered on 38 mm (1.5 in) of steel plate. An armored tube with the same level of protection extended below the conning tower; all communication means from the bridge were conducted through this tube, including telegraph wires, speaking tubes, and control cables from the helm.

=== Modifications ===
The ship was modified several times in the course of her career, including two major refits. Bullivant anti-torpedo nets were installed in 1890. In 1894, it was decided that the torpedo boats should no longer be carried, and Iver Hvidfeldt exchanged them for a pair of steam barges that could be fitted with 1-pounder revolver cannon and a spar torpedo. In 1897, another six 1-pounder revolver cannon were added to strengthen the light battery, along with a pair of 1-pounder automatic guns and two 8 mm (0.31 in) machine guns. At some point in the 1890s or early 1900s, the original searchlights were removed and a pair of 900 mm (35 in) searchlights were installed, one on platforms on each mast. During this period, a wireless telegraph was also added.

In 1904, the two 356 mm torpedo tubes were removed, along with the anti-torpedo nets. The 120 mm guns were removed in 1906–1907 and eight 57 mm guns were added, bringing the total number of those guns to ten. Just three years later, four of the 57 mm guns were transferred to the coastal defense ship Skjold, and by 1912, the remaining six guns were replaced with 47 mm (1.9 in) guns. The ship had had all guns except the 260 mm guns removed by 1916.

== Service history ==
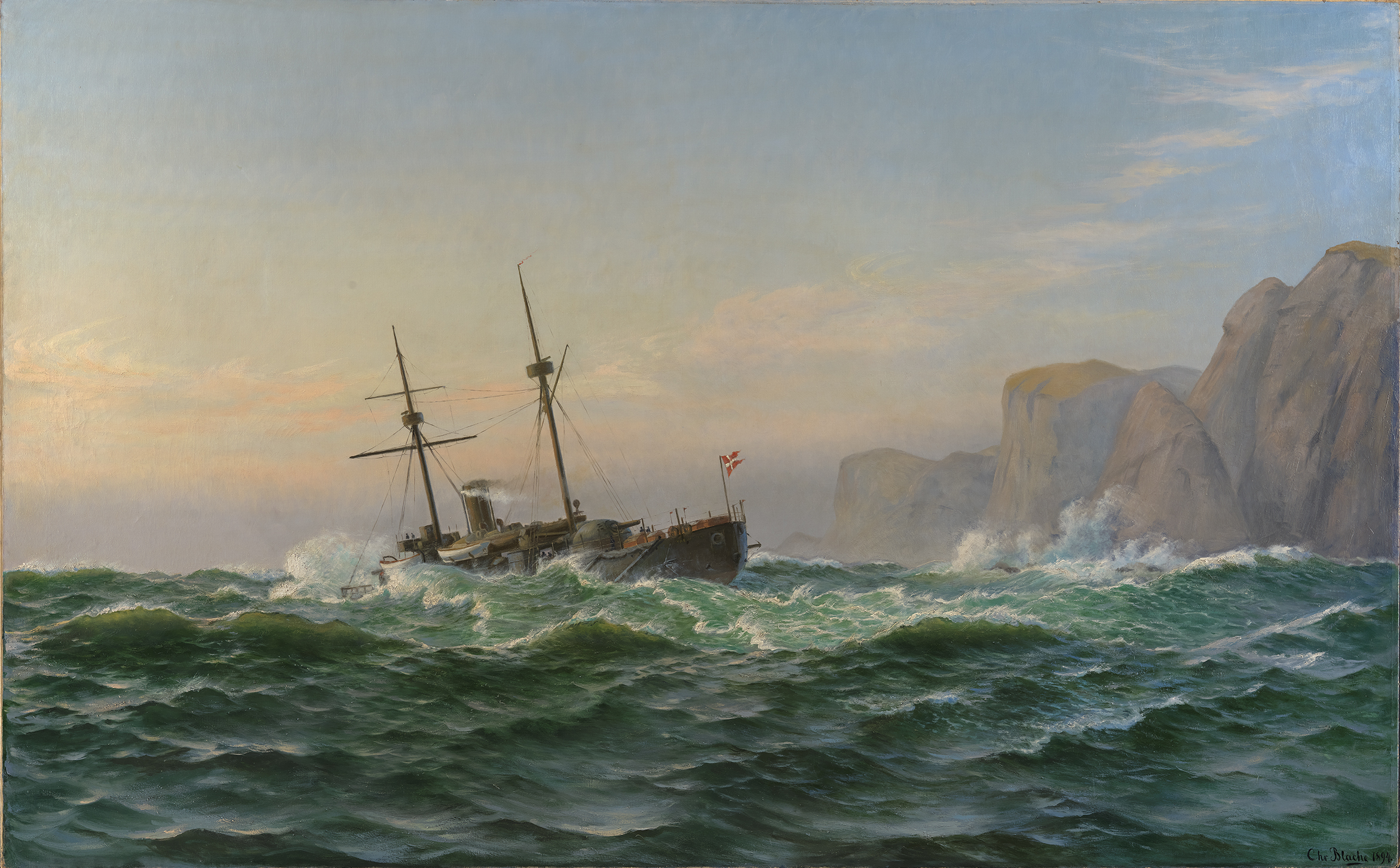
Painting of Iver Hvitfeldt in heavy seas, by Christian Blache

Iver Hvitfeldt was built at the Orlogsværftet shipyard in Copenhagen; her keel was laid down on 9 April 1884. She was launched on 14 April 1886, and after completing builder's sea trials, she was commissioned into the Royal Danish Navy on 1 June 1887. Throughout much of Iver Hvitfeldt's career, she spent most of the year out of service in reserve, but would be activated in May or June for the annual training cycle that would end in September or October. During these periods, she would cruise independently to train the crews that had been mobilized for that year's maneuvers, after which she would join the other vessels that had been activated for squadron exercises. In July 1890, Iver Hvitfeldt led the summer training squadron under the command of Rear Admiral Bragg; the unit also included the screw corvette St Thomas, the protected cruiser Valkyrien, and three torpedo boats.

During the individual cruising period of the 1893 training cycle, Iver Hvitfeldt visited Trondheim, Norway. In July 1896, she visited Sheerness and Gravesend in Britain in company with Valkyrien to represent Denmark at a naval review held to mark the marriage of Prince Carl of Denmark to Maud of Wales. Later that year, both ships took part in the squadron exercises, along with the cruisers Gejser and Absalon. The training program that year saw the ships commissioned in May for individual training cruises in June and July, followed by squadron maneuvers in August. Iver Hvitfeldt was dry-docked to be modernized in 1898–1899. During the 1899 training cruise, Iver Hvitfeldt visited Kiel, Germany. Later that year, she led the training squadron, which also included Valkyrien, Gejser, the training ship Hjälperin, and four torpedo boats.

While laid up after the conclusion of the 1903 training cycle, Iver Hvitfeldt caught fire on 18 December and was badly damaged before the fire was put out. The contemporary naval historian and journalist William Laird Clowes noted that the ship was "probably beyond repair". The contemporary publication Army and Navy Journal described the ship as having been "destroyed by a fire which originated in her coal bunkers." In early 1904, however, the ship was reconstructed and modernized again, and her armament was updated slightly. By this time, the 356 mm torpedo tubes were removed and half of the Hotchkiss revolvers were replaced with ten 6-pounder guns. The work was completed in time for her to be recommissioned on 2 June 1904 for the annual training program.

Further refits were carried out in 1906. Iver Hvitfeldt was the only ironclad to be commissioned for the 1907 training year. She visited Rotterdam in the Netherlands that year, and when King Frederick VIII of Denmark arrived home after a cruise to the Faroe Islands, Iver Hvitfeldt met his vessel off Helsingør on 21 August. She then escorted his ship back to Copenhagen. This was to be the ship's last training cycle; she was not activated in 1908, and she was formally allocated to the reserve fleet in 1909. Iver Hvitfeldt was not among the vessels mobilized by the Danish fleet after the start of World War I in August 1914. Instead, she remained moored at the Orlogsværftet in reserve. In 1918, she was reclassified as a barracks ship. Soon after the end of the war, the ship was struck from the naval register on 26 February 1919 and sold to ship breakers for scrapping. The vessel was sold to a Dutch firm based in Rotterdam; by July 1919, she had been towed there and dismantling work had begun.
