= Helgoland (ship) =

Several ships were named Helgoland after the island of Heligoland (German: Helgoland) or the Battle of Helgoland, an action during the Second Schleswig War.

== Germany ==
- Helgoland (1860 ship), a Rickmers Line ship wrecked in 1863
- SS Helgoland (1870), a HAPAG steamship in service 1872–1879
- SS Helgoland (1891), a Hansa Line tug in service until 1928
- SS Helgoland (1896), a NDL steamship in service 1900–1914
- SMS Helgoland (1909), a 23,000-ton Helgoland-class battleship, launched 1909
- SS Helgoland (1919), a HAPAG steamship in service until 1922
- SS Helgoland (1922), a NDL steamship in service 1936–1942
- SS Helgoland (1939), a HAPAG steamship in service until 1946
- SS Helgoland (1942), a whaler requisitioned by the Kriegsmarine during the Second World War
- MV Helgoland (1963), a HAPAG ferry, then hospital ship used in the Vietnam War from 1966 to 1971
- German tug Helgoland (1966), a Helgoland-class (Type 720) tug, decommissioned 1997
- MV Helgoland (2015), an lng-powered ferry to Heligoland.

== Austria-Hungary ==
- SMS Helgoland (1867), a corvette
- SMS Helgoland (1912), a Novara-class cruiser

== Denmark ==
- Danish ironclad Helgoland
