= Dancing on the Outskirts =

2015 short story collection by Shena Mackay

Dancing on the Outkirts
- First edition
- Author: Shena Mackay
- Cover artist: Colin O'Brien
- Language: English
- Genre: Short story collection
- Publisher: Virago Press
- Publication date: 2015
- Publication place: United Kingdom
- Media type: Print
- Pages: 320
- ISBN: 0-349-00703-9

Dancing on the Outskirts is a short story collection by British author Shena Mackay published in 2015.

== Stories ==
- "Awesome Day" (first broadcast on BBC Radio 4, July 2011, read by Burn Gorman) - Sitting in a Lower East Side bar in New York, Rick's affair with actress Merial ends after five weeks. The bar attendant is unsympathetic as Rick looks back over his relationship with her...(inspired by the song "One for My Baby")
- "Babushaka in the Blue Bus" (first published in The Times Literary Supplement, 1998) - On Good Friday, an actor travels in the front of the top deck of a bus in South London. Meanwhile, a gospel choir sing on the lower deck, behind him two women talk about their respective issues and a Russian lady at the back offers home-made hot cross buns for Holy Communion to those around her, including a hungry dog.
- "The Day of the Gecko" (from The World's Smallest Unicorn, 1998) - After the New Delhi World Book Fair, Allie and her assistant Natasha fly to Goa to try and find the reclusive novelist Eric Alabaster who has disappeared after writing four novels between 1970 and 1985...(online text)
- "Electric-Blue Damsels" (from Dreams of Dead Women's Handbags, 1987) - At almost 16, Fayette Gordon is working in a chip-shop, her teacher Maurice is obsessed with her, encouraging her to study A-levels. Fayette has now stopped school and works in a pet shop, where Maurice now buys tropical fish. Fayette now sings in a local rock band called the Electric-Blue Damsels (tropical fish).
- "Ennui" (first broadcast on BBC Radio 4 in December 2001, read by Tilly Vosburgh) - Milly and Hubert live in a rented flat in Camden Town, where Milly is worried about the Camden Town Murder. Hubert is the assistant of the painter Walter Sickert, but Milly has lost her job and together they pose in many of Sickert's paintings (including one named Ennui).
- "Family Service" (from Babies in Rhinestones, 1983) - Helen Brigstock manages to get her family in time for the Sunday morning service, she tries to be positive but everything conspires to make the experience frustrating. Despite everything she says 'I do think it's important for a family to worship together'.
- "Glass" (from Femme de Siècle ed. Joan Smith) - Artist Jessamy Jones considers changing from paintings to glass; as she sees it in the street around her and in shop windows...
- "Grasshopper Green" (from Black Middens, New Writing Scotland 31, 2013) - Agnes Cameron lives alone, watching the birds in her garden but suspects she is being stalked. She has just lost her job as the local hardware shop has closed down as she considers returning to Scotland.
- "Heron Cottage" (from Seduction ed. Tony Peake) - Two sisters, Rosamund and Lucy enter the house of one of Rosamund's neighbours Esmee who recently died of pneunomia. They have brought supplies in preparation of the following day's funeral. Lucy finds a sheaf of letters and discovers that Esmee's had an admirer who later arrives carrying flowers...
- "The Last Sand Dance" (from The World's Smallest Unicorn, 1998) - Middle-aged actress Zinnia's marriage is failing as her husband Norman attempts to resurrect his career as a playwright. She finds out that his latest play is a reflection of her own family's decline of the Music Hall, including the eponymous dance...
- "The Late Wasp" (from Babies in Rhinestones, 1983) - Most pupils look forward to a day trip to Boulogne, but Darren Cheeseman instead spends a ramble on the Downs with teacher Mr Glenn...
- "The Laughing Academy" (from The Laughing Academy, 1993) - Vincent McCloud's singing career is on the rocks - convicted of tax evasion and swindled by his manager Delves Winthrop. He has secured a one-night show at The De La Warr Pavilion in Bexhill-on-Sea and takes the opportunity to call on Delves, who lives nearby.
- "A Mine of Serpents (first broadcast on BBC Radio 4, November 1992 read by Stephen Moore) - On Guy Fawkes Night landlord Gerald reminisces on the fireworks of his youth. Meanwhile, he has somehow allowed psychic Madame Alphonsine to live in a vacant room where she brings in her customers...
- "The New Year Boy" (first broadcast on BBC Radio 4, January 1992, read by Maggie Steed) - Widow Monica teaches the guitar and piano, but her favourite is the harmonica, matching her name. On New Year's Day Monica discovers first-footer Peter sleeping with a hangover on her sofa...
- "Pigs in Blankets" (First broadcast on BBC Radio 4, August 2008, read by Hugh Bonneville) - Fee and Zac normally closed the restaurant on Mondays, but had celebrated "National Pigs in a Blanket Day" on 24 April. But unknown to them someone had wiped clean the notice in front of the "Old Post Office Restaurant" so there were no customers...
- "Pink Cigarettes" (from Babies in Rhinestones, 1983) - Simon who should be studying for his O-levels is instead acting as amanuensis for Vivian Violett, an elderly poet who is writing his memoirs.
- "Pumpkin Soup" (from S Magazine, Sunday Express, 2010) - Suki had organised a Halloween party and had told her step-daughter Violet not to invite her neighbour Miss Greenwood. At the party, Violet arrives with Miss Greenwood, who has brought Pumpkin Soup...
- "Radio Gannet" (first broadcast on BBC Radio 4 in October 2002, read by Elizabeth Bell) - Sisters Norma and Dolly live contrasting lives in a seaside town; Norma is a respected grandmother living in a large detached house and has no contact with Dolly who lives in a run-down caravan on the other side of the tracks. Then unbelievably Norma hears her sister's voice on the radio - she has started her own station: "Radio Gannet" including campaigns such as "Send a Pet to Lourdes"...
- "The Running of the Deer" (from Park Stories, 2009) - Photographer Clare lives in Richmond Park, where she meets a man who shares her love of the park. Together they agree to combine their efforts to produce a book based on the park...
- "Shinty" (from The Laughing Academy, 1993) - Margaret notices that bestselling author Ronnie Sharples is appearing for a book reading in a local bookshop and Margaret remembers being bullied by Veronica at school where they played shinty. At the book reading things escalate...
- "Shooting Stars" (from S Magazine, Sunday Express, 2010) - Phoebe's boyfriend left her when she was pregnant, with their baby Oscar. She was unable to go to university but lives among students with her quaker landlady Dorcas.
- "A Silly Gigolo" (first broadcast on BBC Radio 4 in October 2009, read by Joanna Tope, celebrating 70 years of nylon stockings) - A shy schoolgirl feels the pull of the stage after a humiliating encounter about her unfashionable stockings with a glamorous fellow pupil...
- "A Silver Summer" (from The World's Smallest Unicorn, 1998) - In 1962, Tessa works in an antique shop but is molested by a stationer's boy where she buys boxes, then she falls in love with an American...
- "Slaves to the Mushroom" (from Dreams of Dead Women's Handbags, 1987) - Sylvia works harvesting mushrooms in vast windowless sheds, paid by the weight of the mushrooms...
- "Soft Volcano" (First published in New Review, 1974) - Richard Garlick helps divorcee Rose Rossi, but he then notices her drunk ex-husband Duncan has been hiding. Richard confronts and then chases him...
- "The Stained-Glass Door" (first broadcast on BBC Radio 3 in February 1980) - Jean Macallister was proud of her house as she pitied her neighbour, but now Jean's husband has left her, and as the bills mount she turns to drink...
- "Starlight Blaze and the Pepperpot" (from Good Housekeeping) - At school Annette and Jilly were obsessed with horses, Annette was the leader but it was Jilly "Pepperpot" who made it to the Olympic dressage team. Hazel remembered that Annette had been kind to a girl whose father had been jailed for luring girls into his ice-cream van.
- "Where the Carpet Ends" (from Dreams of Dead Women's Handbags, 1987) - Off-season, an upper floor of the decaying Blair Atholl Hotel in Eastbourne houses a number of elderly tenants, among them Miss Agnew, who reflects on her situation and of her eccentric neighbours, but she dreams of change...
- "Windfalls" (from The Atmospheric Railway, 2008) - On Martinmas, Martin collects his grandson from school and makes an apple pie from windfalls found in his garden.

== Reception ==
Reviews are positive:

- Michèle Roberts in The Independent praises Mackay: "This new collection of short stories (some drawn from previous publications) showcases her genius for building comedy from terseness and compression...Mackay's precise, unsentimental images, integral to her stories' themes, sum up entire lives...Mackay, the former Queen of Crystal Palace, likes to swerve her eye aside, to survey unfashionable venues. These stories from the eighties cherish suburbia, the poignancy of evenings "made unbearable by night-scented stocks and nicotania mingling with the smell of diesel and chips", the cheeriness of women baking wholemeal pizzas then wrenching on pink rubber gloves to whip up fine pink mists of Windowlene...A triumph!"
- Allan Massie in the Yorkshire Post is also positive: "Shena Mackay writes wonderful short stories, wonderful in that they are full of wonder, and wonderful too in the everyday sense of the word. She has the knack of taking the ordinary and making it extraordinary. She is good on loneliness and pain, but also on the moments of beauty and kindness which shine a sudden light on desolate lives. This selection is the ripe harvested fruit of more than 30 years of writing short stories. There are half a dozen at least that a duller writer might have made a novel of. Mackay has a keen eye and an alert ear. Her prose skips and dances. It both invites you to read quickly, and yet to stop and appreciate the vivid imagery; there are gorgeous flowers scattered throughout these stories. She is one of the finest short-story writers of our time, up there with William Trevor, both of them heirs of Chekhov and fit to stand comparison with him.
