= Helgoland class =

Helgoland class may refer to either of the following:

- Helgoland-class battleship, a class of German battleships built before World War I
- Helgoland-class tug, a class of German ocean-going tug boats
