= HDMS Valkyrien (1888) =

Steamboat

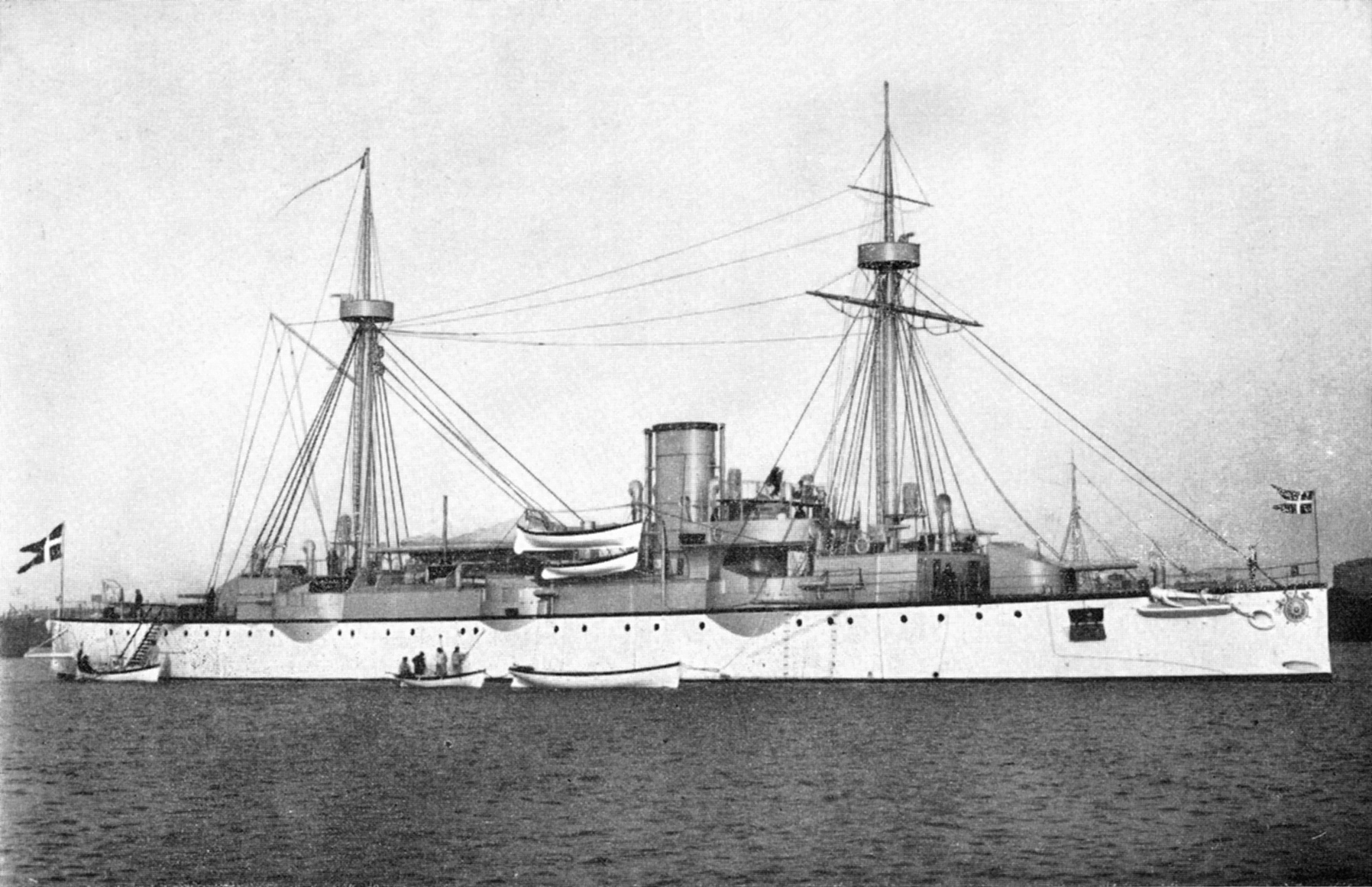
- Valkyrien in 1899

History

Denmark
- Name: Valkyrien
- Namesake: the Valkyries
- Builder: War Shipyard, Copenhagen
- Laid down: 27 October 1886
- Launched: 8 September 1888
- In service: 1890
- Fate: Sold for scrap in October 1923

General characteristics
- Type: Protected cruiser
- Displacement: 3,020 metric tons (2,970 long tons)
- Length: 85.5 m (281 ft)
- Beam: 13.2 m (43 ft)
- Draft: 5.5 m (18 ft)
- Propulsion: 6 cylinder triple boilers
- Speed: 16 knots (30 km/h; 18 mph)
- Range: 3,200 nmi (5,900 km; 3,700 mi) at 10 knots (19 km/h; 12 mph)
- Complement: 282–309 officers and men
- Armament: 2 × 21-cm-L/35 Krupp guns; 6 × 15-cm-L/35 Krupp guns; 4 × 5.7-cm-L/44 Hotchkiss machine gun; 8 × 3.7-cm-L/23 Hotchkiss revolver cannon; 5 × 38-cm torpedo tubes
- Armor: 64 mm (2.5 in)

Valkyrien was a Danish protected cruiser that was in service of the Royal Danish Navy from 1890 until it was sold for scrap in 1923. It was the largest cruiser in the Danish fleet. The ship was used by Prince Valdemar of Denmark on a nine-month tour of East Asia in 1899 and 1900, visiting China, Japan, Thailand, and India. During World War I, it was a station ship in the Danish West Indies from 1915 to 1917, until the islands were sold by Denmark to the United States.

== Technical characteristics ==
Valkyrien was built at the War Shipyard in Copenhagen, started in 1886 and launched in 1888. The machinery was from Burmeister & Wain and provided 5,300 HP. The construction of Valkyrien was radically different from the previous Danish cruisers and was strongly inspired by the Chilean cruiser Esmeralda, which was built a few years earlier at Armstrong in Elswick (near Newcastle). The Esmeralda, completed in 1884, came to affect an entire generation of cruisers: the rigging was removed, and instead made room for a more powerful machinery and a double screw for better maneuverability. At that time, there were problems in making the armor powerful enough to withstand the cannon, so Armstrong chose to drop the side armor and settle for an armor tire, and in return bet on a powerful cannon armor. The Valkyrien followed the recipe from Esmeralda and was thus a modern ship when it was commissioned in 1890. With its top speed of 17.5 knots, the Valkyrien was able to evade most major warships and, in turn, could cope with smaller ships–a true cruiser.

Like the other armored cruisers, Valkyrien quickly became obsolete. New types of armor appeared that could withstand its guns, and new fast-firing artillery was developed, which was far more effective. Not until 1915 did the Valkyrien receive powerful, fast-firing cannons, namely two spare guns from the armored ship Peder Skram. The 21 cm guns could fire one shot every three minutes and the original 15 cm guns one shot per minute. The new 15 cm guns fired 5–6 shots per minute. The classification of the Valkyrien was changed from cruiser-corvette to cruiser in 1910, and at the same time it was transferred to the reserve.

Valkyrien was also able to carry two small torpedo boats (No. 10 and 11), which were delivered by Thornycroft in 1888. The small boats of 17 t were 21 m long and resembled the boats that had already been delivered for the armored ships Tordenskjold, Helgoland and Iver Hvitfeldt. From 1890 to 1893 they were used with the Valkyrien. They were renamed the patrol boats P 10 and P 11 in 1912 and only decommissioned in 1917.

== Operational history ==
Valkyrien entered service for the first time on June 4, 1890, and exercised with the maneuvering squadron from August 5 but was deactivated on September 25. It was put back into service on June 16, 1893, and then accompanied the royal yacht Dannebrog with guests to the wedding of the Duke of York (grandson of the Danish king) with the princess Mary of Teck, who later became the English royal couple. Afterwards it visited Madeira. From August 2 to September 28, 1893, the cruiser then again belonged to the maneuver squadron. The next activation of the ship began with a trip to a wedding in England. This time the trip was carried out with the coastal armored ship Iver Hvitfeldt and the wedding couple were the later Norwegian royal couple, Prince Carl of Denmark and the English Princess Maud, both grandchildren of the ruling monarchs. From July 13 to September 30, 1896, the usual naval service followed for the Valkyrien.

The next activation took place on October 3, 1899, for an East Asia trip expressly advocated by the Danish parliament at the urging of Danish business interests, under the command of the king's youngest son, Prince Valdemar. It was a show of the flag in the Far East by Denmark, where it had commercial interests, as no other Danish warship had been in East Asian waters since Tordenskjold in 1870. With a crew of 272, the cruiser began its journey to Hong Kong via Plymouth, Algiers, Malta, Port Said, Aden, Colombo, Singapore, Bangkok, Saigon. The cruiser then visited Fuzhou, Shanghai, Yokohama, Kobe, Nagasaki and then traveled back via Batavia, Piraeus, Gibraltar and Le Havre. Hans Niels Andersen from Det Østasiatiske Kompagni as a representative of the Copenhagen Chamber of Commerce and the journalist Henrik Cavling followed the cruiser to Thailand with a group of Copenhagen companies on the new freighter Annam. The prince also visited the Siamese king Chulalongkorn and the Japanese emperor Meiji. In Shanghai the crew of the ship, Prince Valdemar, and other passengers attended a banquet. The cruiser returned to Copenhagen on July 31, 1900, and was already on its way back when the Chinese boxer uprising began.

The next service from October 16, 1901, to July 5, 1902, spent the Valkyrien as a station ship in the Danish West Indies. From May 11, 1902, it supported French ships, including the cruiser Suchet, during rescue measures after a volcanic eruption in Martinique. In the first port near the erupted volcano, 600 civilians were taken on board to bring them to safety. From July 1 to September 30, 1903, the cruiser was again in service at home, initially undertaking individual trips and training and from August 3, it was part of the maneuvering squadron. The ship was not reactivated until 1910 and then allocated to the reserve.

On November 4, 1913, the Valkyria was reactivated to be used in the Mediterranean Sea until February 4, 1914. The operation took place after the end of the Balkan Wars with ongoing tensions between the states, whereby due to the close relationship of the royal families, Denmark had special relations with Greece. The cruiser was converted for use and the old, very slow-firing 15 cm guns of the side battery were replaced by modern 75 mm rapid-fire cannons.

When the Danish Navy set up its neutrality watch in World War I from August 1, 1914, the Valkyrien was assigned to the 2nd Squadron on the Great Belt as a residential and training ship. The modernization of weapons started in 1913 was continued and the two old 21 cm cannons were replaced by modern 15 cm Bofors guns. From April 14 to September 21, 1915, the cruiser served as a training ship for naval officers and prospective engineers.

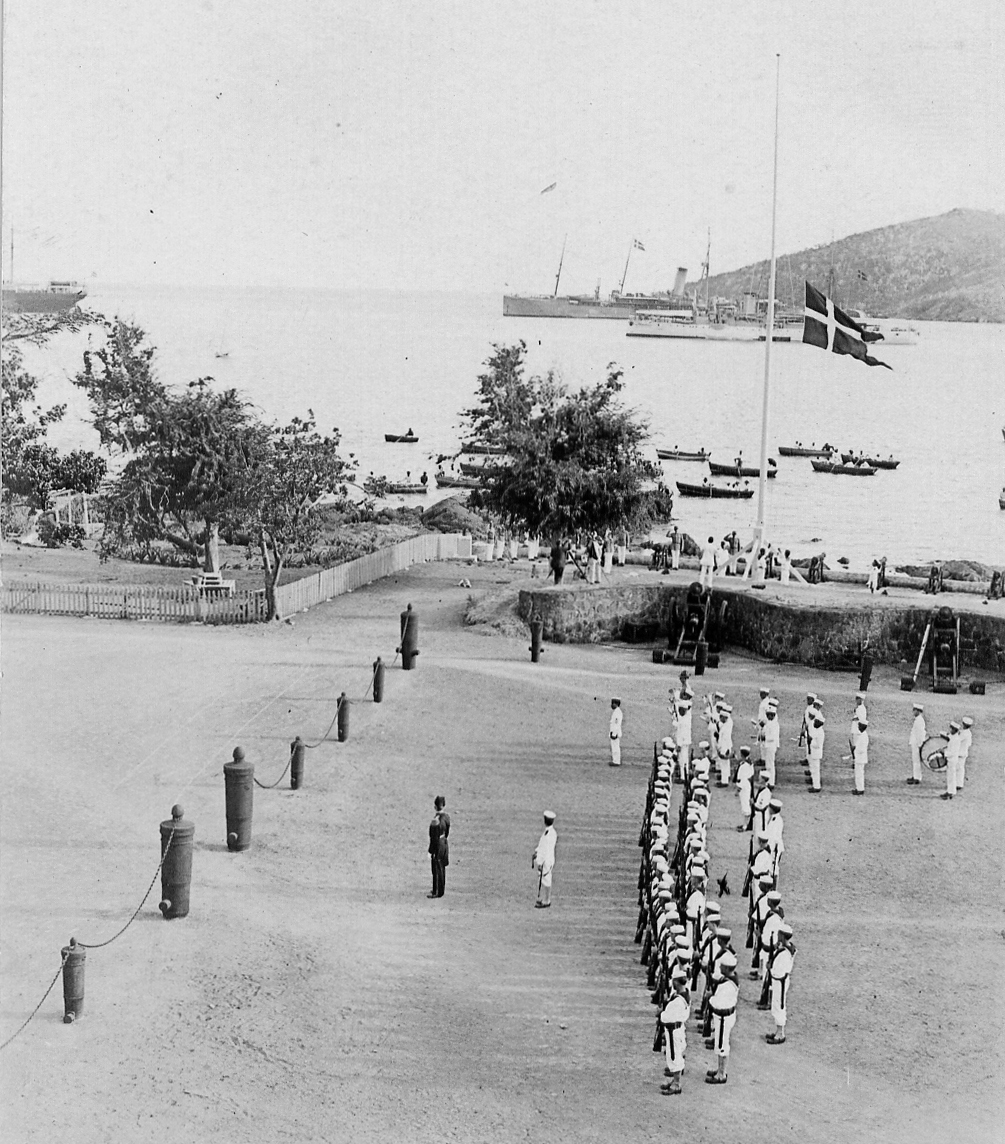
A parade as the Danish flag is lowered on Saint Croix, former Danish West Indies. Valkyrien in the background

On November 8, 1915, the Valkyrien was again the station ship for the Danish West Indies. There was general social unrest among the black population, so Denmark felt compelled to send the cruiser to restore calm and order. In January 1916, the United States and Denmark (again) agreed to sell the Danish West Indies. When the secret negotiations in Denmark became known in the summer of 1916, the nationalists protested. The question was first put to the Danish people's vote. The majority of the Danes voted on December 14, 1916, for the sale of Danish West Indies to the United States. On April 1, 1917, the islands changed hands for $25 million. The commander of the Valkyrien, Royal Danish Navy Captain Henri Konow, was the last Danish governor of the islands and handled the handover, in a ceremony with the US-designated acting governor, United States Navy Commander E. T. Pollock. The islands became the United States Virgin Islands after the Danish flag was lowered and replaced by the US flag, in the presence of the crew of Valkyrien. The cruiser returned to Denmark on May 10, 1917, and was deactivated.

In 1918 the old cruiser was in Holmen and served as a (quarantine) hospital during the Spanish flu. From May to September 1919, it was again a training ship for cadets. In July the ship was sent to Egypt and Malta to move North Schleswig under the German prisoners of war to return to Denmark. The ship returned with 160 men from the camps. From October to February 1920 trips to the Netherlands, Belgium and France followed, which brought another 135 "sønderjyder" back to Denmark. In the summer of 1921 the Valkyrien was used for a trip by the Danish king to the Faroe Islands and Iceland.

From May 17 to September 15, 1923, the last active phase of the ship followed, which served as a training ship for the officers 'and officers' school. The Valkyrien was then sold for demolition, which was completed in Denmark in 1924.

== Danish cruisers ==
Name	Launched	Displacement	Speed	Armament
Valkyrien	8 September 1888	3,020 t	17.5 kn	2 × 21 cm L/35, 6 × 15 cm L/35
Hekla	28 November 1890	1,322 t	17.1 kn	2 × 15 cm L/35
Gejser	8 May 1893	1,282 t	17.3 kn	2 × 12 cm L/40
Hejmdal	30 August 1894	1,342 t	17.0 kn	2 × 12 cm L/40

== Literature ==
- Mads Kirkebæk: China and Denmark: relations since 1674. NIAS Press Copenhagen 1999, ISBN 8787062712.
- Benito Scocozza and Grethe Jensen: The History of Politics of Denmark. Publisher of Politics, 3rd edition, Copenhagen 2005. ISBN 87-567-7064-2.
- R. Steen Steensen: Our Cruisers, Marine History Society, 1971.
- Alexander Svedstrup: The Danish Road, Gyldendalske Boghandels Forlag Copenhagen 1902 (Historical description of the Travels of Cruisers).
