= The Orchard on Fire =

- First edition (UK)
- Author: Shena Mackay
- Cover artist: Cecily Brown
- Language: English
- Publisher: Heinemann (UK); Moyer Bell (US)
- Publication date: 1995 (UK), 1996 (US)
- Publication place: United Kingdom
- Media type: Print & Audio
- Pages: 320
- ISBN: 0-434-00067-1

The Orchard on Fire is a 1995 novel, the best known work of British author Shena Mackay. It has been identified as one of the best novels of the 1990s.

== Synopsis ==
It is 1953. Percy and Betty Harlency leave the pub they have been running in London and take over a tea-shop in Stonebridge, a village in Kent. They have a daughter, April, aged eight, and a son, Peter, is born in Stonebridge.

April makes two special friends. Her best friend is Ruby, a girl of her age, whose parents, Lex and Gloria Richards, run the village pub. They run a good pub but they are rough people and Lex is violent to his daughter. He blacks her eye; he cuts off one of her pigtails with a breadknife. Ruby is a high-spirited red-haired girl. She likes playing with fire, setting fire to napkins, for example.

April's other friend is Mr Greenidge, a charming, old-fashioned gentleman with blue eyes and a white beard. April's parents are pleased that he likes her. He lives in a fine house in the village and is admired for the way he cares for his ailing wife.

Mr Greenidge tells April that he loves her, presses her against his body, and kisses her. He gives her presents of money and sweets; on one occasion, realizing she has lost an expensive propelling pencil, he buys her a replacement, to her deep gratitude. He finds excuses to bring her to his home; once, when Mrs Greenidge is away, he takes her to the bedroom and makes her lie on the bed with him; once, while she is seated on his thigh, he masturbates. When she does not see him, he stalks her. He asks her to reassure him that she loves him; bewildered and frightened, she gives the answer that pleases him.

April and Ruby explore an abandoned orchard and find an abandoned railway carriage in it. It has been stripped inside and taken over by nature, but they make it their secret “camp”. They bring things from home to make it comfortable, and wish they could be there always. But one day, they find a handkerchief dropped there; from the initial on it, April realizes it is Mr Greenidge's.

A young girl is molested in a wood near the village by a stranger. When they were living in London, April was molested and threatened by their landlady's adolescent son. She is sure she has seen him in Stonebridge. She tells her parents and the police. But the police accept his alibi for that day. Feeling that she has not been believed, April feels that she cannot tell anyone now about Mr Greenidge.

A large property in the village is owned by a wealthy, Jewish, Communist family. They hold a garden party in their grounds. Ruby, forbidden to go, goes secretly. Her father, drunk and enraged, comes and tries to drag her away. Some men attack him. Ruby escapes and rides away fast on her bicycle. Next morning she is still missing. April knows where she is but will not say, sure that Ruby will be punished when she is found. But Mr Greenidge lets slip, as if inadvertently, that there is a railway carriage, and Ruby is found. As she is carried away, the orchard is burning. She says she started the fire by accident. Immediately afterwards, her family leave. “They’ve done a flit,” April is told.. There are one or two letters from Ruby, from Maidstone, Kent. But soon April's parents, deep in debt, have to leave Stonebridge, and the girls lose touch.

Mrs Greenidge is growing weaker, as if about to die. Mr Greenidge curses her and says he will marry April when she is older. April wildly imagines that she will be responsible for Mrs Greenidge's death. But she also believes that Mr Greenidge is killing her; she has seen him showing a strong interest in poisonous fungi. After Mrs Greenidge's death she tells her suspicions to two adult friends and to some children at school. Gossip spreads. The body is exhumed and death is confirmed to be from natural causes.

The novel is narrated by April in the mid-1990s. She is sure that Mr Greenidge loved her and perhaps what he did was not so bad; but “he corroded my childhood with fear and anxiety and deceit.” She revisits Stonebridge and discovers Ruby's grave: she died two years previously; her children were named April and Peter.

The novel evokes a rural childhood in particular, and English social conventions in general, at that time. There are about fifty named characters.

== Recognition ==
- Shortlisted for the 1996 Booker Prize
- New York Times Book Review, Notable book of 1996
- Publishers Weekly, "Best Books" of 1996
