= Embassy of Denmark, Beijing =

The Royal Danish Embassy in Beijing is Denmark's foremost diplomatic mission in the People's Republic of China. The embassy is located on 1 Dong Wu Jie, San li Tun, in the Chaoyang district of Beijing.

Denmark recognized the People's Republic of China on January 9, 1950, and diplomatic relations between Denmark and People's Republic of China was established on May 11, 1950. Denmark was the first Western country to recognize the People's Republic of China. The current embassy compound was finished in June 1974 and is designed by the famous Danish architect, Gehrdt Bornebusch It contains the ambassador's residence as well as offices for the more than 60 employees situated in the embassy.

The Royal Danish Embassy in Beijing is the largest Danish diplomatic mission in the world with more than 60 employees. The embassy's primary tasks are:

- To ensure that the Chinese-Danish diplomatic relations are maintained and optimized.
- To provide assistance to optimize Denmark's commercial interests in China (see Trade Council).
- To raise awareness of Danish culture as well as ensuring that the education and career opportunities which the Denmark provides are communicated to the Chinese population (see Public Diplomacy events).
- To provide visa and consular services for Chinese citizens as well as providing prompt and effective assistance to Danes in China.

== Trade council ==
The promotion of Danish commercial interests in China is done through the embassy's Trade Council. The Trade Council's job is to strengthen the Danish export efforts and promote investment activities between Denmark and China. The trade council assists companies with everything from strategic planning to legal counselling, market research, visit programs and public affairs, functioning as companies' bridge between Denmark and China.

== Public diplomacy events ==
In order to communicate Danish culture to China and to raise awareness of the opportunities Denmark provides for Chinese citizens with regards to for instance education and career, the Danish embassy hosts various Public Diplomacy events. Examples of these are Open Denmark Day where more than 3,800 Chinese citizens and journalists were invited to visit the embassy to experience various sides to Danish culture, as well as Climate Race, a cycling race through Beijing promoting Danish cycling and green culture. Climate Race and Open Denmark Day have both been nominated for the PR Asia award.

== List of Danish ambassadors to China ==
- 1912-1920 – Preben F. Ahlefeldt-Laurvig
- 1921-1923 – Janus F. Øiesen
- 1924-1932 – Henrik Kauffmann
- 1932-1939 – dk:Oscar O'Neill Oxholm (diplomat)
- 1940-1946 – Hialmar Collin
- 1946-1953 – Alex Mørch
- 1953-1959 – Aage Gregersen
- 1959-1962 – Hans Bertelsen
- 1962-1965 – Anker Svart
- 1965-1968 – Troels Oldenburg
- 1968-1972 - Jørn Stenbæk Hansen
- 1972-1976 - Janus A.W. Paludan
- 1976-1980 – Kjeld Vilhelm Mortensen
- 1980-1983 – Rudolph A. Thorning Petersen
- 1983-1986 – Flemming Hedegaard
- 1986-1991 – Arne Belling
- 1991-1994 – William Friis-Møller
- 1995-2001 – Christopher Bo Bramsen
- 2001-2004 – Ole Lønsmann Poulsen
- 2004-2007 – Laurids Mikaelsen
- 2007-2010 – Jeppe Tranholm-Mikkelsen
- 2010-2015 – Friis Arne Petersen
- 2015-2020 - Anders Carsten Damsgaard
- 2020-now - Thomas Oestrup Moeller

== Other Danish representations in China ==
- Royal Danish Consulate General in Guangzhou
- Royal Danish Consulate General in Shanghai
- Innovation Centre Denmark in Shanghai
- The Trade Council of Denmark in Taipei

== See also ==
- China–Denmark relations
