= Dunedin (novel) =

1992 book by Shena Mackay

- First edition
- Author: Shena Mackay
- Language: English
- Publisher: Heinemann 1992 (UK); Moyer Bell 1993 (US)
- Publication place: United Kingdom
- Media type: Print
- Pages: 341

Dunedin is a novel by Scottish author Shena Mackay. It is her seventh book and was published in 1992 by Heinemann. It won a 1994 Scottish Arts Council book award.

== Plot ==
The novel starts in 1909 where Presbyterian minister Jack Mackenzie and his young family arrives from Scotland to Dunedin in New Zealand to replace the Reverend Craigie, who died in trying to save his wife after she fell in a thermal pool at Tikitere. Jack Mackenzie has an obsession with botany but then forms a secret relationship with a half-caste woman Myrtille, who owns a Māori shrunken head...

The novel then switches to 1989 London where his grandchildren Olive and William who share a house in South London. Jay is also Jack's grandchild by Myrtille where he meets Olive in the Horniman Museum, but they are unaware of their relationship to each other and they make their separate ways. Olive has had a year long relationship with Terry, a writer and is trying to put him behind her and but then she snatches a baby on the tube. William has resigned as a headmaster following the death of one of female pupils when she was pushed under a Metro train in Paris where he was supervising them. Jay travelled from New Zealand to London but was then attacked and mugged, he eventually finds "Dunedin" the house inhabited by his grandfathers family where he squats surrounded by other down-and-outs. Jay notices that one of the occupants has found a shrunken head under the floorboards. Jay is then incarcerated in a terrifying prison...

At the end of the novel in 1910 Jack's dalliance with Myrttle are revealed, passing down to Jay's lineage. The shrunken head is stolen from Myrttle. London.

The shrunken head appears to have cursed the Mackenzie family since it was stolen and brought to London, though the curse is not made explicit...

== Reception ==
Paul Bailey writing in The Independent states about the ambitious novel:

"Shena Mackay notices a London that passes most writers by...Her London is not a convenient backdrop - it is the capital itself, vividly and freshly set down in glancing detail. My sole criticism of the novel has to do with the character of Jay Pascal, a New Zealander who lives for a while as a squatter in a house named Dunedin. His mysteriousness somehow eludes Shena Mackay, who explains rather than portrays him. His eventual incarceration fits uneasily into the overall design of the book, and the author veers towards the sentimental."

The Publishers Weekly also has its reservations:

"Mackay illuminates both the larger moral and social issues that plague London and also the cruelty and pathos beneath the surface of daily life. But Dunedin loses poignancy under the characters' avalanche of angst. As their problems proliferate, the narrative urgency fades and one is left wanting a sparser, deeper work so that other interesting characters like Jay, Minister Mackenzie's bastard son, might live more fully."

Susannah Clapp in The London Review of Books is also equivocal. She writes:

"Plot has never been a central attraction in Mackay's Fiction: she introduces topics, strands of subject-matter and characters, and lets them unravel, sometimes intertwine, often fade away and frequently get dumped. There is as much meander as development – appropriately, for she writes about dreamers and ditherers. She is a writer of moments, of sharp touches, who has found as many fervent advocates for her short stories as for her novels...Her preoccupations and style haven't changed much in the course of a thirty-year writing career. She still makes a lot of jokes. Her protagonists are still semi-detached from society. She still takes off in fantastic flights of visual imagery...Dunedin profits from these characteristics, though it is not her best novel. It is bigger than her previous books – there are more pages, more characters, more countries, more overt themes – and its bigness exposes a tendency to inconsequentiality which can seem a triumph of coolness but can seem merely careless."
