= The Artist's Widow =

1998 novel by Shena Mackay

- First edition
- Author: Shena Mackay
- Cover artist: Carol Sharp
- Language: English
- Publisher: Jonathan Cape (UK); Moyer Bell Ltd. (US)
- Publication date: Jul 1998 (UK); Jun 1999 (US)
- Publication place: United Kingdom
- Media type: Print
- Pages: 288
- ISBN: 0-224-05134-2

The Artist's Widow is a novel written by British author Shena Mackay and first published in 1998 by Jonathan Cape. It is mentioned twice in the Bloomsbury Good Reading Guide (2003)

== Plot introduction ==
Set in the contemporary art scene in London, it is centred on Lyris, the widow of John Crane, and begins at a viewing of her late husband's work; also present are her friend Clovis Ingram – a bookstore owner, a beautiful young television film-maker called Zoe, and Lyris' great nephew Nathan Pursey, an up-and-coming performance artist. The book concerns their complex interrelationships in the wake of John Crane's death.

== Reception ==
- According to The Concise Oxford Companion to English Literature (2003) this 'satire on modern artistic values, is one of her most astringent novels'.
- Paul Baumann's review in The New York Times opened with 'this is a vicious little book, and thus all the more enjoyable'.
- Michael Arditti in The Independent is also positive, "Mackay’s gifts for biting description and black comedy are both much in evidence here" and her "prose is a joy to read".
- Publishers Weekly concludes "As her characters experience the insecurities of youth, the crises of the middle years and the regrets of old age, Mackay explores the issues of artistic creativity, moral values and friendship. She writes in language as quick and lethal as a snake's tongue... The sadness at the narrative's core is beautifully controlled; the wit is buoyant."
