= Shena Mackay =

Scottish novelist and short-story writer (born 1944)

Shena Mackay FRSL
- Born: June 6, 1944 (age 81); Edinburgh, Scotland
- Education: Tonbridge Grammar School
- Occupations: Novelist, short-story writer
- Notable work: Redhill Rococo (1986); Dunedin (1991); The Orchard on Fire (1995); Dancing on the Outskirts (2015)
- Awards: Fawcett Society Book Prize; Scottish Arts Council Book Award

Shena Mackay FRSL (born 6 June 1944) is a Scottish novelist born in Edinburgh. She was shortlisted for the Booker Prize for Fiction in 1996 for The Orchard on Fire, and was shortlisted for the Whitbread Prize and the Orange Prize for Fiction in 2003 for Heligoland.

== Biography ==
=== Early years ===
Mackay was born in Edinburgh, Scotland, in 1944. After the Second World War, her family moved to Hampstead, London, and eventually settled in Shoreham, Kent, from where she attended Tonbridge Grammar School. Her writing career started with her winning a poetry competition in the Daily Mirror at the age of 16, while still at school. After leaving school, she began working in an office, before getting a job at an antique shop in Chancery Lane. The antique shop was owned by the parents of art critic David Sylvester, with whom Mackay had her daughter Cecily.

=== Writing ===
Mackay's first publication, in 1964, was a volume of two novellas, Dust Falls on Eugene Schlumburger and Toddler on the Run.

In 1965, she published her first novel, Music Upstairs, set in London in the early 1960s.

She won the Fawcett Society Fiction Prize in 1986 for her novel Redhill Rococo and the Scottish Arts Council Book Award for her 1991 novel, Dunedin.

Her novel The Orchard on Fire was published in 1995 and was shortlisted for the Booker Prize for Fiction. Characterised by Publishers Weekly as "finely wrought and touching", the novel is set in the 1950s and focuses on April, an eight-year-old girl from Streatham who is forced to move to Kent when her parents decide to run a tearoom.

Mackay's 2003 novel, Heligoland, was shortlisted for the Whitbread Prize and the Orange Prize for Fiction. Peter Bradshaw commented on her "consistently beautiful writing" and a review in The Times called the novel "an exceptional performance".

Mackay has been described as "a skilled observer of the British class system and its discontents", receiving praise for her short stories as well as her novels. A review of her 2015 Dancing on the Outskirts observed that she is "a master of subtle irony, and ... the comedy of unexpected juxtapositions and her skewering perception", while Allan Massie in The Scotsman said: "Shena Mackay writes wonderful short stories, wonderful in that they are full of wonder, and wonderful too in the everyday sense of the word. She has the knack of taking the ordinary and making it extraordinary. She is good on loneliness and pain, but also on the moments of beauty and kindness which shine a sudden light on desolate lives. This selection is the ripe harvested fruit of more than 30 years of writing short stories. There are half a dozen at least that a duller writer might have made a novel of. She is a comic writer, but one who might also say, 'And if I laugh at anything, / 'tis that I may not weep'." Michèle Roberts noted: "Shena Mackay's work has glittered from the start. ...This new collection of short stories (some drawn from previous publications) showcases her genius for building comedy from terseness and compression. ...A triumph!"

Mackay was elected a Fellow of the Royal Society of Literature in 1999, and was also appointed Honorary Visiting Professor at Middlesex University.

=== Personal life ===
In an interview with The Telegraph in 2004, Mackay explained that she is synaesthetic and "sees words as colours", her own name being yellow.

She married Robin Brown in 1966 and they brought up her three daughters, Sarah Clark, Rebecca Smith and painter Cecily Brown. Her daughter Cecily was not told that Sylvester was her father until she was an adult. Mackay and Brown later divorced and she moved back to London. As of 2008, Mackay lives in Southampton. She is in favour of an independent Scotland.

Her grandson is the writer Gabriel Smith.

== Works ==
=== Novels ===
- Music Upstairs (1965)
- Old Crow (1967)
- An Advent Calendar (1971)
- A Bowl of Cherries (1984)
- Redhill Rococo (1986)
- Dunedin (1992)
- The Orchard on Fire (1995)
- The Artist's Widow (1998)
- Heligoland (2003)

=== Short story collections ===
- Dust Falls on Eugene Schlumburger/Toddler on the Run (1964)
- Babies in Rhinestones (1983)
- Dreams of Dead Women's Handbags (1987)
- The Laughing Academy (1993)
- Collected Short Stories (1994)
- The World's Smallest Unicorn (1999)
- The Atmospheric Railway (2008)
- Dancing on the Outskirts (2015)

=== As editor ===
- Friendship: An Anthology (1997)

== Awards and nominations ==
- 1987: Fawcett Society Book Prize for Redhill Rococo
- 1994: Scottish Arts Council Book Award for Dunedin
- 1996: Booker Prize for Fiction (shortlisted) for The Orchard on Fire
- 2003: Orange Prize for Fiction (shortlisted) for Heligoland
- 2003: Whitbread Novel Award (shortlisted) for Heligoland
