= HDMS Valkyrien =

The following ships of the Royal Danish Navy have borne the name HDMS Valkyrien:

- HDMS Valkyrien, lost at the Battle of Copenhagen (1801)
- HDMS Valkyrien a corvette in service 1846-1867
- HDMS Valkyrien (1888) a cruiser launched in 1888 and sold for scrap in 1923
