= Heligoland (band) =

- Origin: Melbourne, Victoria
- Genres: Slowcore; Dreampop
- Years active: 1999–present
- Labels: Alone Again. Records; Ocean Music; Commission 45
- Members: Karen Vogt - vocals Steve Wheeler - bass Dave Olliffe - guitar Antti Mäkinen - drums Ash Brideson - keyboards
- Past members: Cameron Gellatly; Pete McKeown; Chris Wright; Bek Varcoe
- Website: http://www.heligoland.org/

Heligoland are a five-piece band from Melbourne, Australia. The band is now based in Paris, France. Heligoland's songs and sound have been compared to the atmospheric textures and soaring female vocals of Cocteau Twins, the spartan soulfulness of Low and the wistful melancholy of Mojave 3.

== Discography ==
=== Albums ===
Title	Format	Label	Release
Shift These Thoughts	CD	Big Rig Records	July 2003
A Street Between Us	CD	Alone Again. Records	March 2006
All Your Ships Are White	CD	Commission 45	September 2010
This Quiet Fire			12 February 2021

=== Other releases ===
Title	Format	Label	Release
Demo	Promo CD	Independent	December 1999
Heligoland	CD EP	Independent	June 2000
"Separate"	7" single	Steady Cam Records	November 2001
"Along The Snowline"	7" single	Steady Cam Records	May 2002
Coming Up For Air	Promo CD	Alone Again. Records	September 2005
"Nearly Everything Is New"	CD single	Alone Again. Records	October 2005
Bethmale	CD EP	Commission 45	January 2012
Coriallo	CD EP	Independent	December 2017

== Other projects ==
Several past and present members of Heligoland have been (and are still) involved in other musical projects:

- Steve has played guitar in Tugboat and has played bass guitar in Dandelion Wine
- Dave plays guitar in Tides
- Pete plays guitar in Marionettes
- Bek plays drums in Tugboat
- Steve Wheeler & Antti Mäkinen have, on occasion, toured with Robin Guthrie (Cocteau Twins) as The Robin Guthrie Trio, most notably performing a small UK tour in February 2013
