= Heligoland (novel) =

2003 novel by Shena Mackay

- First edition
- Author: Shena Mackay
- Language: English
- Publisher: Jonathan Cape
- Publication date: 2003
- Publication place: United Kingdom
- Media type: Print & audio
- Pages: 208
- ISBN: 0-224-05934-3

Heligoland is a novel by British author Shena Mackay, first published in 2003 by Jonathan Cape. The Guardian reviewer said of the book: "This is drawn so playfully and so compassionately – and with such consistently beautiful writing – that the experience is mysteriously comic and sweet." Heligoland was shortlisted for both the Whitbread Prize and the Orange Prize for Fiction.

== Plot ==
Rowena Snow, a woman of Scottish-Asian parentage but brought up as an orphan dreams of Heligoland, once mentioned in the Shipping Forecast but now apparently lost forever. She applies for a position as live in housekeeper at "The Nautilus", a crumbling 1930s-built spiral-shaped building in South London, inhabited by an artistic community. Only two of its original inhabitants remain, Celeste Zylberstein and Francis Campion along with Gus Crabb, an antiques dealer. The story tells of Rowena coming to terms with her past and finding her place in the community.
