= The Atmospheric Railway =

- First edition
- Author: Shena Mackay
- Cover artist: Jonny Hannah
- Language: English
- Genre: Short story collection
- Publisher: Jonathan Cape
- Publication date: 2008
- Publication place: United Kingdom
- Media type: Print
- Pages: 432
- ISBN: 0-224-07298-6

The Atmospheric Railway: New and Selected Stories, is a 2008 short story collection by British author Shena Mackay comprising thirteen new stories, and twenty-three selected from earlier collections.

== Stories ==
- "The Atmospheric Railway" (first published by A Public Space in 2008) - Neville is returning by train to Poole in Dorset after spending the weekend with his cousin Beryl who has been researching a distant aunt - Florence Graham and her companion Archie Erskine. Florence founded a school for sickly children, Archie worked on the construction of an 'atmospheric railway' in South London.
- "Nanny" (first broadcast on BBC Radio 4 in March 2007, read by Barbara Flynn) - Writer and critic Campbell Forsyth gives a lecture on "Fiction and Metafiction" to a literary society in a country town. After the talk he is accosted by an old flame who was once a nanny for his children. After they leave the hall together she turns into a vengeful goat.
- "Radio Gannet" (first broadcast on BBC Radio 4 in October 2002, read by Elizabeth Bell) - Sisters Norma and Dolly live contrasting lives in a seaside town; Norma is a respected grandmother living in a large detached house and has no contact with Dolly who lives in a run-down caravan on the other side of the tracks. Then unbelievably Norma hears her sister's voice on the radio - she has started her own station: "Radio Gannet" including campaigns such as "Send a Pet to Lourdes"...
- "The Lower Loxley Affect" (first published in The Times in 2003) - Linda and her brother Maurice are united in their love of The Archers, a long-running BBC radio soap set in Lower Loxley. Whilst Linda plans a nasty surprise for 'Flatface', a tomcat who has been terrorizing her. Maurice makes cardboard cut-outs of his family, used to fool neighbours that he has company..
- "That Innocent Bird" (first broadcast on BBC Radio 4 in July 1998) - On the West coast of Scotland Jock MacSiller is the tall, soft-spoken landlord of the "Walrus Inn" with his Martiniquan wife, daughter and two talkative parrots for company. Unheard, the parrots reveal Jock to be Long John Silver.
- "The Heart of Saturday Night" (first broadcast on BBC Radio 3 in April 2007) - Alex has just completed a year as visiting professor of a university but is staying on to run a couple of workshops at the university's summer poetry school, both to give him inspiration for his entry in his university apartment visitors book but more importantly to allow him opportunity to spend more time with Blythe Gridley, the American wife of a colleague.
- "Jumbo Takes a Bath" (first published in the Sunday Express) - Eloise prepares for a blind date with a friend of a friend which turns out far more eventful than she had feared when he arrives with bleeding fingers and a squirrel in his jacket acquired at Green Park tube station.
- "Shalimar" (first published in the Sunday Express Magazine in 2001) - Effie de Vere no longer lets out rooms in 'Shalimar', her Ayr guest house. As she takes her 'crazy yellow dog' for a walk one stormy day she recalls the dramatic events surrounding its arrival and the earlier 'disappearance' of one of her guests...
- "Nay, Ivy, Nay" (first broadcast on BBC Radio 4 in December 1998, read by Crawford Logan) - the title and theme comes from the chorus of an old English carol, "The Contest of the Ivy and the Holly" describing the conflict between man and woman. A botany professor suffers an unwelcome disturbance from Ivy, a neighbour, asking for a sprig of his beloved holly to decorate a Christmas pudding for her sister...
- "Wasp's Nest" - A man explains his love for wasp's nests.
- "Windfalls" - On Martinmas, Martin collects his grandson from school and makes an apple pie from windfalls found in his garden.
- "Swansong" (first broadcast on BBC Radio 4 in January 2006, read by Barbara Flynn - inspired by Elvis Presley's first hit "Heartbreak Hotel" in 1956, 50 years before) - after 40 years Louisa returns to her home town for a friends funeral and spots her first love Jeff in a charity shop, but her boots keep beating out "Heartbreak Hotel".
- "Ennui" (first broadcast on BBC Radio 4 in December 2001, read by Tilly Vosburgh)- Milly and Hubert live in a rented flat in Camden Town where Milly is worried about the Camden Town Murder. Hubert is the assistant of the painter Walter Sickert, but Milly has lost her job and together they pose in many of Sickert's paintings (including one named Ennui).

From Babies in Rhinestone (1983) :

- "Bananas" - Imogen Lemon suffers unwelcome attention from the owner of a local convenience store whom she nicknames 'bananas'. To her embarrassment he keeps trying to sell her gin and cigarettes. He later disappears only to reappear on the fly-ridden meat display.
- "Evening Surgery" - Dr Frazer, a GP is having an affair with one of his patients which takes place during evening surgery, meanwhile Mavis his formidable receptionist has a firm grip on fast approaching Christmas.
- "Pink Cigarettes" - Simon who should be studying for his O-levels is instead acting as amanuensis for Vivian Violett, an elderly poet who is writing his memoirs.
- "Babies in Rhinestone" - Art teacher Alfred Ellis and dance tutor Araidne (sic) Elliot run their respective schools from adjoining premises. Their mutual antagonism comes to a head over a cat which shares their attentions...

From Dreams of Dead Women's Handbags (1987) :

- "The Most Beautiful Dress in the World" - Harriet has the whole day to herself but a series of interruptions and a disastrous attempt to wash her daughter's favourite dress cause her to snap and murder the gasman with a marrow.
- "Cardboard City" - Vanessa and Stella escape the clutches of their stepfather and spend a day Christmas shopping in Harrods and Covent Garden.
- "Dreams of Dead Women's Handbags" - Crime writer Susan Vigo, travelling by train to a literary foundation where she is guest reader, struggles with the plot of her next book.
- "Other People's Bathrobes" - Adam, inveterate thief and liar is searching his latest girlfriends flat. He finds her family photo album and when he sees her as a plumpo little girl, falls in love with her.
- The Thirty-first of October - Claudia, separated and now alone in her dilapidated country cottage recounts her problems with the family living next door and plans to turn the tables on the two young daughters when they come trick or treating.
- All the Pubs in Soho - It's 1956 and gay couple, Arthur and Guido moves into the small Kent village of Filston arousing suspicion and fear. But Joe is fascinated by them and spends as much time as possible in their company...
- "Where the Carpet Ends" - Off-season an upper floor of the decaying Blair Atholl Hotel in Eastbourne houses a number of elderly tenants, amongst them is Miss Agnew who reflects on her situation and of her eccentric neighbours, but she dreams of change...

From The Laughing Academy (1993) :

- "A Pair of Spoons" - Vivien and Bonnie, a lesbian couple take over the old village post office and set up as antique dealers.
- "Angelo" - Violet Greene attends the funeral of her first lover Felix, at St. James's, Piccadilly.
- "The Curtain with a Knot in it" - Alice visits her senile father in hospital every day and gets to know Pauline who works there. One day Pauline invites her back to her room in the staff residential block.
- "Cloud-Cuckoo-Land" - Since retirement Roy and Muriel Rowley have devoted themselves to good works of all kinds; from taking in injured animals and collecting jumble to giving blood and manning helplines; but their efforts are not appreciated by all.
- "The Laughing Academy" - Vincent McCloud's singing career is on the rocks - convicted of tax evasion and swindled by his manager Delves Winthrop. He has secured a one-night show at The De La Warr Pavilion in Bexhill-on-Sea and takes the opportunity to call on Delves, who lives nearby.

From Collected Short Stories (1994) :

- "Till the Cows Come Home" - it is the Fifth of November 1954 and the Smithers family is preparing for Guy Fawkes Night.

From The Worlds Smallest Unicorn (1999) :

- "The Worlds Smallest Unicorn" - Teddy arrives back at his brother Webster's house after spending twenty years working in Hong Kong.
- "Crossing the Border" - Flora is researching her Great-Uncle Lawrence, a poet and is travelling to visit her Great-Uncle Lorimer who lives in a home for retired clowns.
- "Death by Art Deco" - Lily has entered a short-story competition; novelist Andrea Heysham is one of the judges but is unable to convince the other judges that Lily's story should win and so offers her a job.
- "Trouser Ladies" - Beatrice is meeting her best friends daughter.
- "The Index of Embarrassment" - The narrator visits his reclusive Uncle Bob (who is compiling an index of embarrassing situations) and discovers that one of his neighbours has died. He takes Bob's dog Fido for a walk and meets the dead man's mother.
- "Barbarians" - Ian and Barbara run a mail order children's clothing company called 'Barbarians' and using their own children and those of their employees as models.

== Reception ==
Reviews are generally positive :

- Jane Shilling of The Daily Telegraph writes "Her themes are generally contained within a domestic framework. She writes about families, loneliness, railways, suburbia, cats, clothes, old age, poets, shape-shifting, the oppression of kindness and the fatal stab of unkindness. Her style has a lyric elegance that has deceived critics into describing her, with that most dismissive term of faint praise, as 'gentle'. But she is not gentle. She writes with a beautiful, controlled savagery of (to borrow one of her own phrases) 'the familiar tenderised and made strange by the darkness'. There are other writers with this gift - Helen Simpson, Hilary Mantel, Jane Gardam come to mind. Mackay resembles them both in the beauty of her prose and in the absolute originality of her voice."
- Aamer Hussein in The Independent finishes his review with "The bizarre and the banal, the half-remembered and the yet-to-come, brilliantly intertwine in the sentences of this most imaginative yet most practical of writers".
- Booktrust says "This is a wonderfully bittersweet selection of works by one of the modern masters of the short story. Shena Mackay is always entertaining, even as she conveys the humour and poignancy of relationships beset by the ravages of time and family life, as well as hard-earned compassion for her characters.
- Alyssa McDonald in the New Statesman writes "There are many writers who can elicit much feeling from a rollicking plot, but very few can manipulate the dreaminess of memory and fantasy with such exacting precision, or make the minutiae of other people's lives so sympathetic."
- However Jenny Turner writing in The Guardian says the stories are "fabulous in patches, but do not quite add up"
