= HDMS Tordenskjold (1852) =

Danish frigate

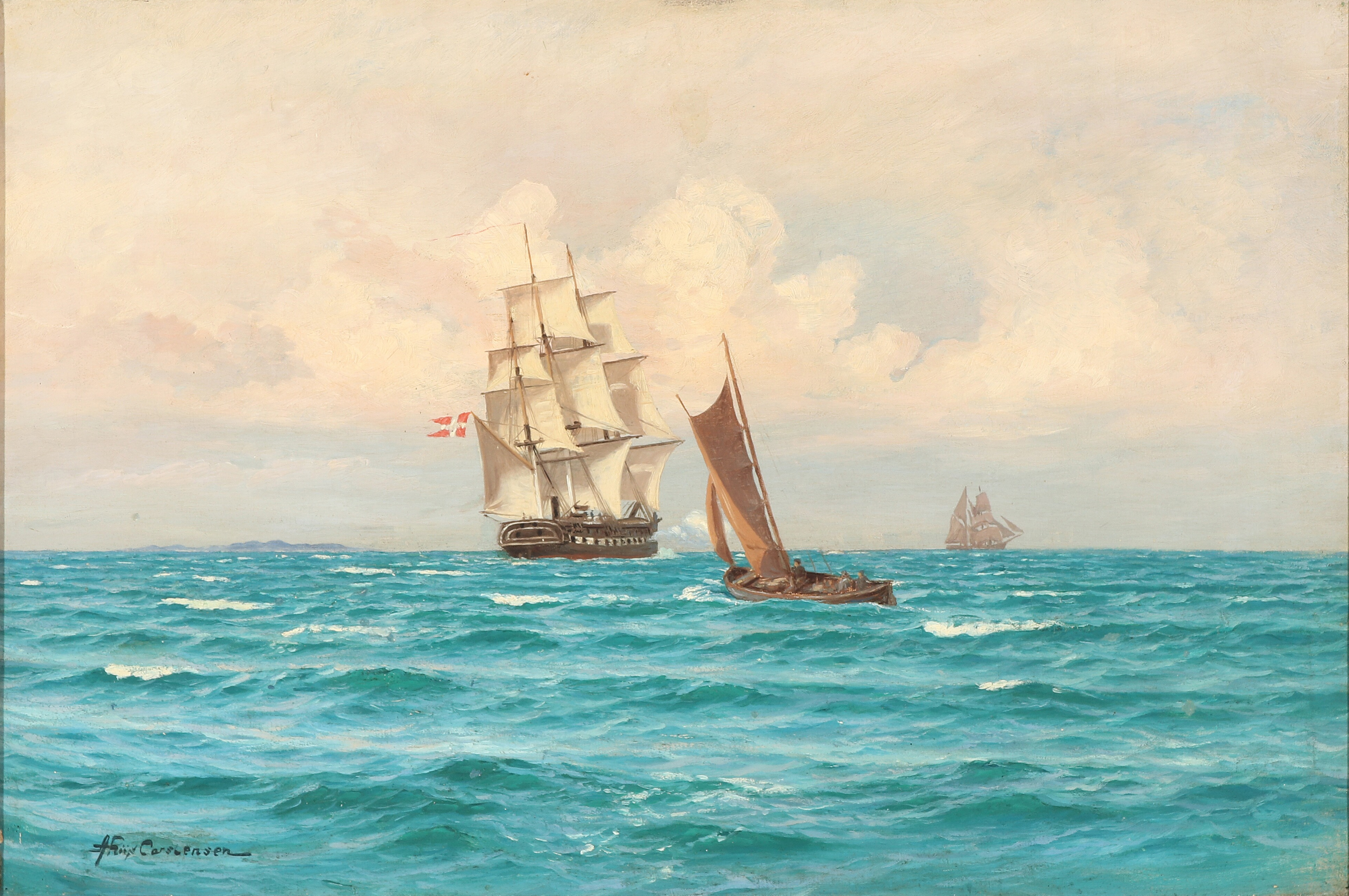
- HDMS Tordenskjold guarding the Prussian Coast in 1864

History

Denmark
- Name: Tordenskjold
- Namesake: Tordenskjold
- Builder: Nyholm shipyard, Copenhagen
- Launched: 16 June 1852
- Commissioned: 15 April 1854
- Decommissioned: 17 February 1872
- Home port: Copenhagen
- Fate: Sold to merchant service and sank in 1892

General characteristics
- Type: Steam and screw frigate
- Displacement: 1,453 long tons (1,476 t)
- Length: 50.40 m (165 ft)
- Beam: 12.86 m (42 ft 2 in)
- Draft: 5.38 m (17 ft 8 in)
- Installed power: 200 shp (150 kW) (1862)
- Propulsion: 1 × shafts; 1 × steam turbine
- Speed: 8 knots (15 km/h; 9.2 mph)
- Armament: (1854); 44 × 30-pounder long gun; (1862); 2 × BL 60-pounder gun; 14 × 30-pounder long gun; 16 × 18-pounder long gun

Tordenskjold was a steam frigate of the Royal Danish Navy. The ship was named after Peter Tordenskjold, an 18th-century Danish admiral.

== Construction and career ==
She was launched on 16 June 1852 by Nyholm shipyard in Copenhagen. She was commissioned on 15 April 1854.

In 1871, she was sold for merchant service and sank in the Atlantic in 1892.

== See also ==
- Lists of ships of the Royal Danish Navy
- HSwMS Stockholm
- USS Constitution
