= MV Galapagos Legend =

German-built cruise ship

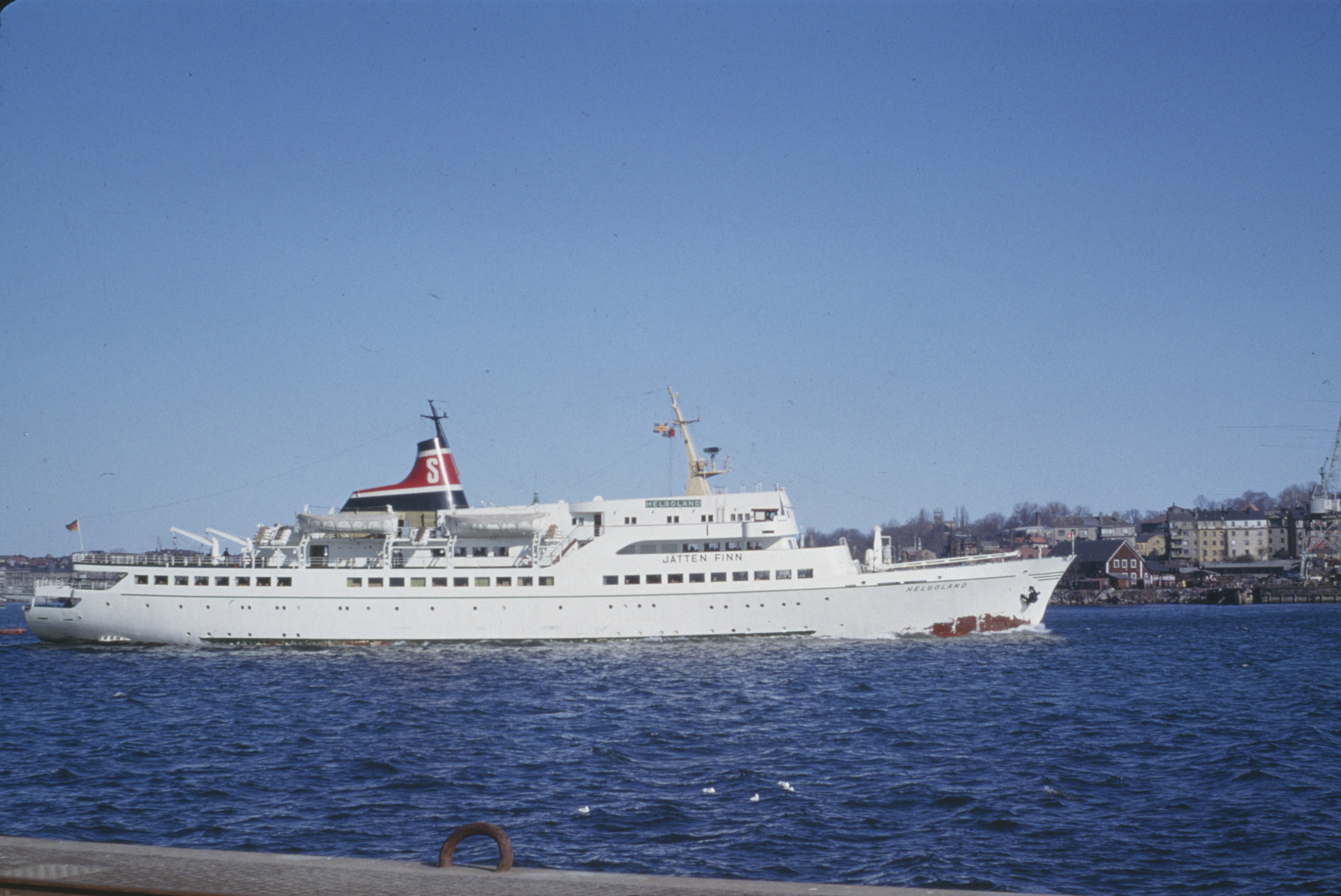
- As Helgoland, 1965

History
- Name: Helgoland: (1963–1972); Stena Finlandica: (1972–1975); Baltic Star: (1975–2000); Galapagos Legend: (2000–present)
- Owner: HADAG: (1963–1972); Stena Reederei GmbH: (1972–1976); KG Seetouristik: (1976–1993); Förde Reederei Seetouristik GmbH & Co: (1993–2000); Latin Cruises: (2000–2006); Galatours: (2006–present)
- Operator: German Red Cross: (1966–1971)
- Port of registry: Ecuador
- Builder: Howaldtswerke Hamburg AG
- Yard number: 943
- Launched: 9 March 1963
- Completed: 24 May 1963
- Maiden voyage: 1963
- In service: 1963–present
- Identification: IMO number: 5404964

General characteristics
- Tonnage: 2,890 gross tons
- Length: 91.92m
- Beam: 14.53m
- Installed power: 6,000 hp
- Propulsion: 2 × KHD RBV12M350 diesel engine
- Speed: Maximum: 19 knots; Service: 15 knots
- Capacity: 100 passengers

MV Galapagos Legend is a German-built cruise ship that operates cruises in the Galapagos Islands. It is the only independent 100 passenger cruise liner in the archipelago that is locally owned in Ecuador and is not part of a large corporation. Earlier in its career as the MV Helgoland it served as a hospital ship during the Vietnam War from 1966 to 1971.

== History ==
The ship was built in 1963 for the HADAG shipping company at the Howaldtswerke Hamburg AG shipyard as a sea-going ship and operated until 1965 on the Cuxhaven-Helgoland line. In this function, it replaced the Bunte Kuh (1957) and was replaced in 1966 by Alte Liebe. From 1963 to 1965, it was chartered several times outside of the summer season to Stena Line for service between Gothenburg and Frederikshavn and between Stockholm and Mariehamn.

=== Vietnam War ===
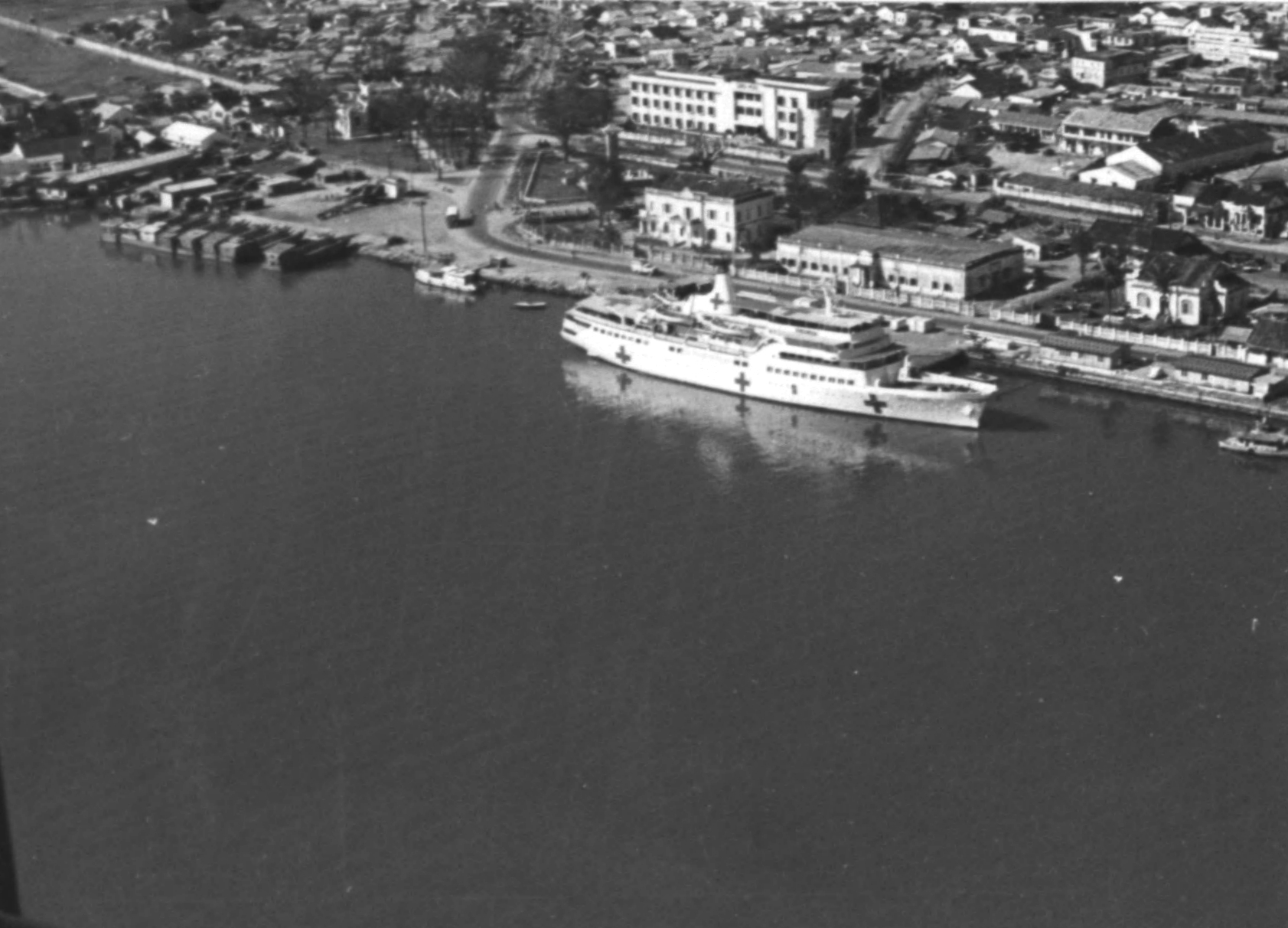
Helgoland hospital ship in Da Nang, January 1970

From 1966, HADAG chartered Helgoland to the German Red Cross, which, after extensive renovations, commissioned the ship on behalf of the West German government as a floating hospital, officially known as the Helgoland hospital ship, in South Vietnam. Helgoland had 150 beds for inpatient care, three operating theaters and four specialist departments (surgery, internal medicine, gynecology and radiology). The medical staff included 8 doctors, 4 medical technicians, 4 administrators and 18 nurses. The 30-strong crew consisted of captain, nautical officers, ship engineers, electricians, radio operators, carpenters, sailors and cooks.

In order to ensure special protection as a civilian hospital in an armed conflict, an agreement was concluded between the West German and South Vietnamese governments on 18 May 1966 governing the operation of the hospital ship. The German Red Cross "dispatched a Red Cross hospital ship with civilian personnel in agreement with the government of the Republic of Vietnam" (Article 1). The ship received a certificate from the South Vietnamese government, which classed it as a civil hospital within the meaning of Articles 18 to 20 of the IV Geneva Conventions of 1949 (Article 4, Paragraph 2); the Red Cross armbands and ID cards to be worn by the ship's personnel were stamped by the Republic of Vietnam (Art. 12, Paragraph 2). The ship was marked with the Red Cross protection symbol and the staff wore the German Red Cross's official clothing during the service (Article 4, Paragraph 1); the ship was exempt from any searches or seizures (Article 4, Paragraph 3). Due to the fact that it was classified as a civilian hospital and not as a hospital ship (in accordance with Article 25 of the II Geneva Convention), no notifications between the parties to the conflict were required. Nevertheless, the International Committee of the Red Cross formally informed the parties involved in the conflict about the ship's duties.

On 10 August 1966, Helgoland set sail for Saigon arriving on 3 October 1966. More than 21,000 out-patient treatments were given to approximately 6,700 patients from September 1966 until 30 June 1967. Over 850 major surgical cases were also treated. On 12 September 1967 Helgoland moved to Da Nang. 54 doctors and 160 nurses worked on Helgoland during the course of the mission. A total of 11,000 inpatients and 200,000 outpatient treatments were performed, the treatments were free for patients who were all civilians. The mission was funded by the West German government with running costs of about $2.5 million a year. Helgoland remained at Da Nang until 31 December 1971 when it was replaced by a new 170 bed hospital ashore, operated by the Maltese Aid Service and financed by the West German government. The medical equipment from Helgoland was passed to three South Vietnamese hospitals, a local leper colony and the Maltese Hospital.

In order to take up supplies from a German supply ship, Helgoland had to go into international waters as the supply ship was not allowed to dock in Da Nang for insurance reasons.

Whenever it received warning of a rocket attack on Da Nang the ship would move into Da Nang harbor earning it the nickname Chicken of the sea.

=== Baltic Sea ===
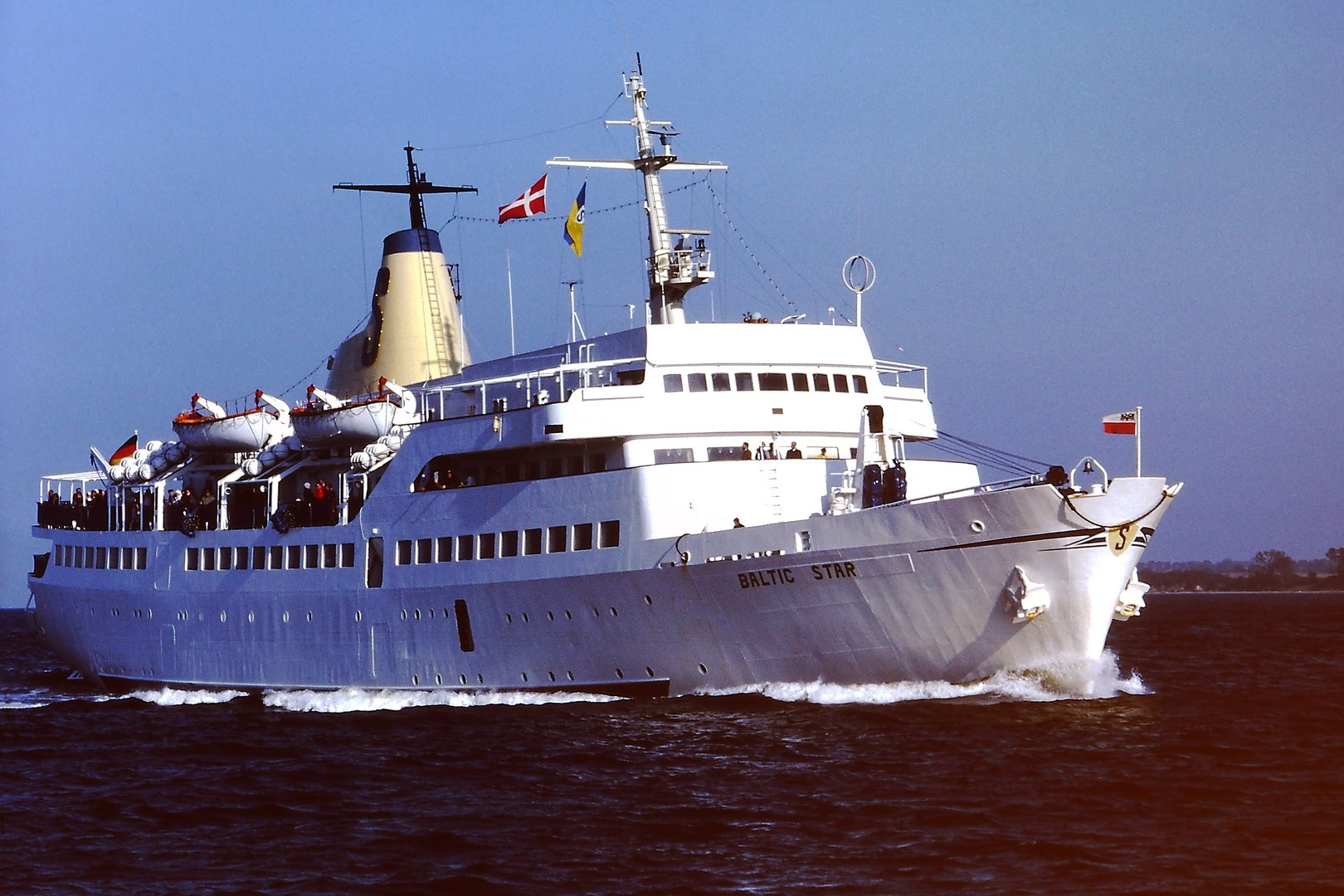
As Baltic Star, 1987

HADAG sold the ship to Stena Reederei GmbH in Kiel and in 1972 commissioned a new sea-going ship under the name Helgoland. The former Helgoland was renamed Stena Finlandica and ran regular services between Stockholm and Mariehamn, as well as between Kiel and Korsør. In 1975 the ship was chartered to Förde Reederei Seetouristik GmbH Lübeck and renamed Baltic Star. Under this name it served between Travemünde and Rødbyhavn in Denmark. In 1976 it was sold to the KG Seetouristik in Flensburg and in 1977 Lübeck became its home port. From 1987 it was also used between Travemünde and Warnemünde. In 1993 it was purchased by Förde Reederei Seetouristik GmbH and made "Butter Cruises" on the Baltic Sea until 1999 with a capacity of 1,500 passengers.

=== Galapagos ===
In 2000 the ship was sold to Latin Cruises in George Town, Cayman Islands, and conversion to a cruise ship followed. Renamed the Galapagos Legend, the ship cruised around the Galapagos Islands carrying up to 100 passengers. In 2002, the Galapagos Legend was placed under the Georgian flag. In 2006 it was sold to the Galatours shipping company in Guayaquil, Ecuador.
