= Fehmarn-class tug =

Class of German Navy tugboats

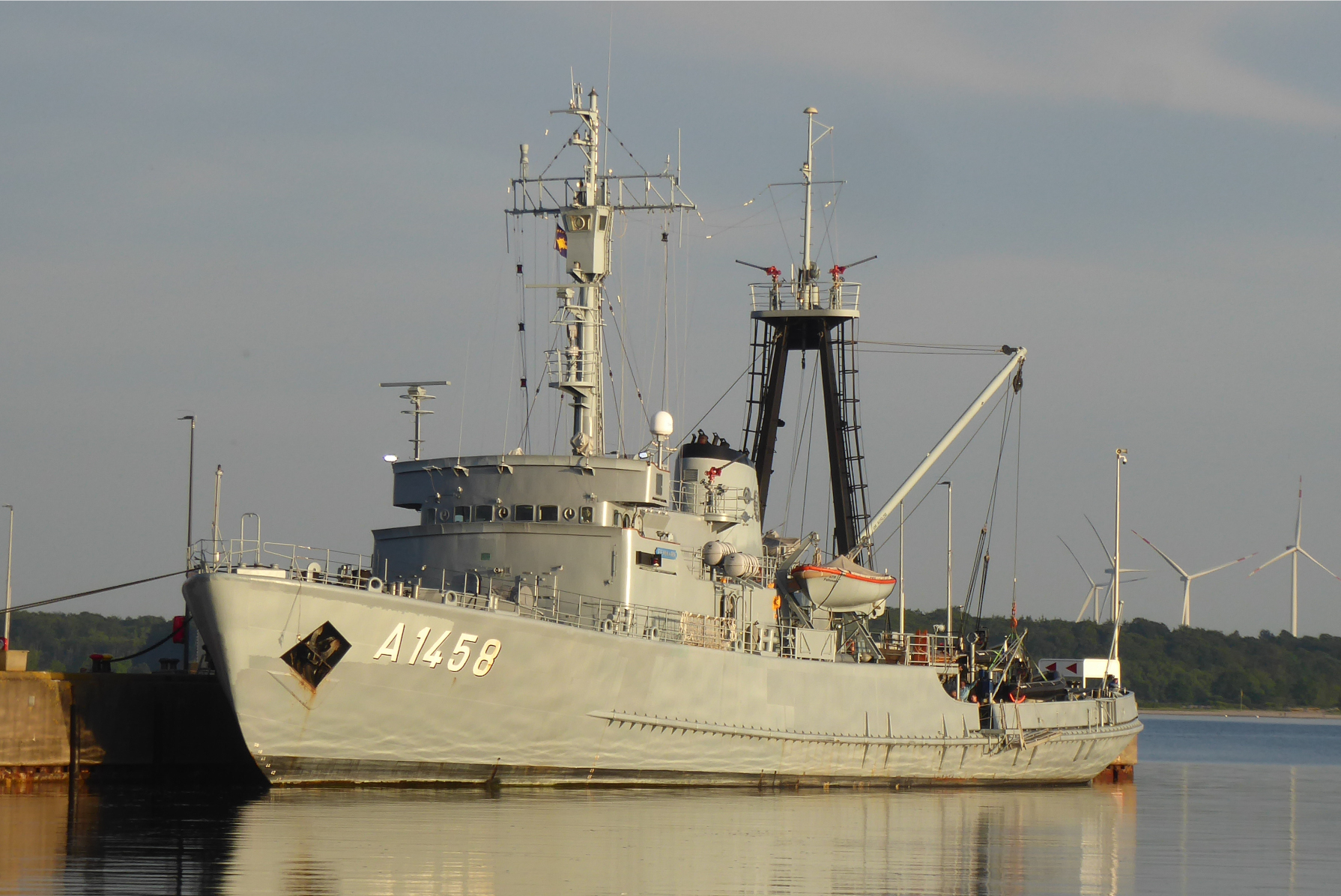
- Fehmarn in Eckernförde (2022)

Class overview
- Name: Helgoland class
- Operators: German Navy
- In commission: 1966–2022
- Completed: 2
- Retired: 2

General characteristics
- Type: Salvage tug
- Displacement: 1,310 t (1,289 long tons)
- Length: 68 m (223 ft 1 in)
- Beam: 12.7 m (41 ft 8 in)
- Draft: 4.4 m (14 ft 5 in)
- Speed: 16.6 knots (30.7 km/h; 19.1 mph)
- Range: 6,000 nmi (11,000 km; 6,900 mi)
- Complement: 45

The Type 720 Helgoland-class tugs are large seagoing salvage tugs used by the German Navy. After the decommissioning of Helgoland, the class is now referred to as the Fehmarn class in the German Navy. As with other auxiliary ship classes in Germany, these tugboats are crewed by civilians. The ships are named after the German islands Helgoland (Heligoland) and Fehmarn.

== List of ships ==
Pennant number	Name	Type/ Upgrade	Call sign	Commissioned	Decommissioned	Base/fate
A1457	Helgoland	720A	DRLE	March 8, 1966	December 19, 1997	Sold to Uruguayan Navy as ROU 22 Oyarvide
A1458	Fehmarn	720B	DRLF	February 1, 1967	Out of active service end 2022	Kiel
