= HDMS Helgoland =

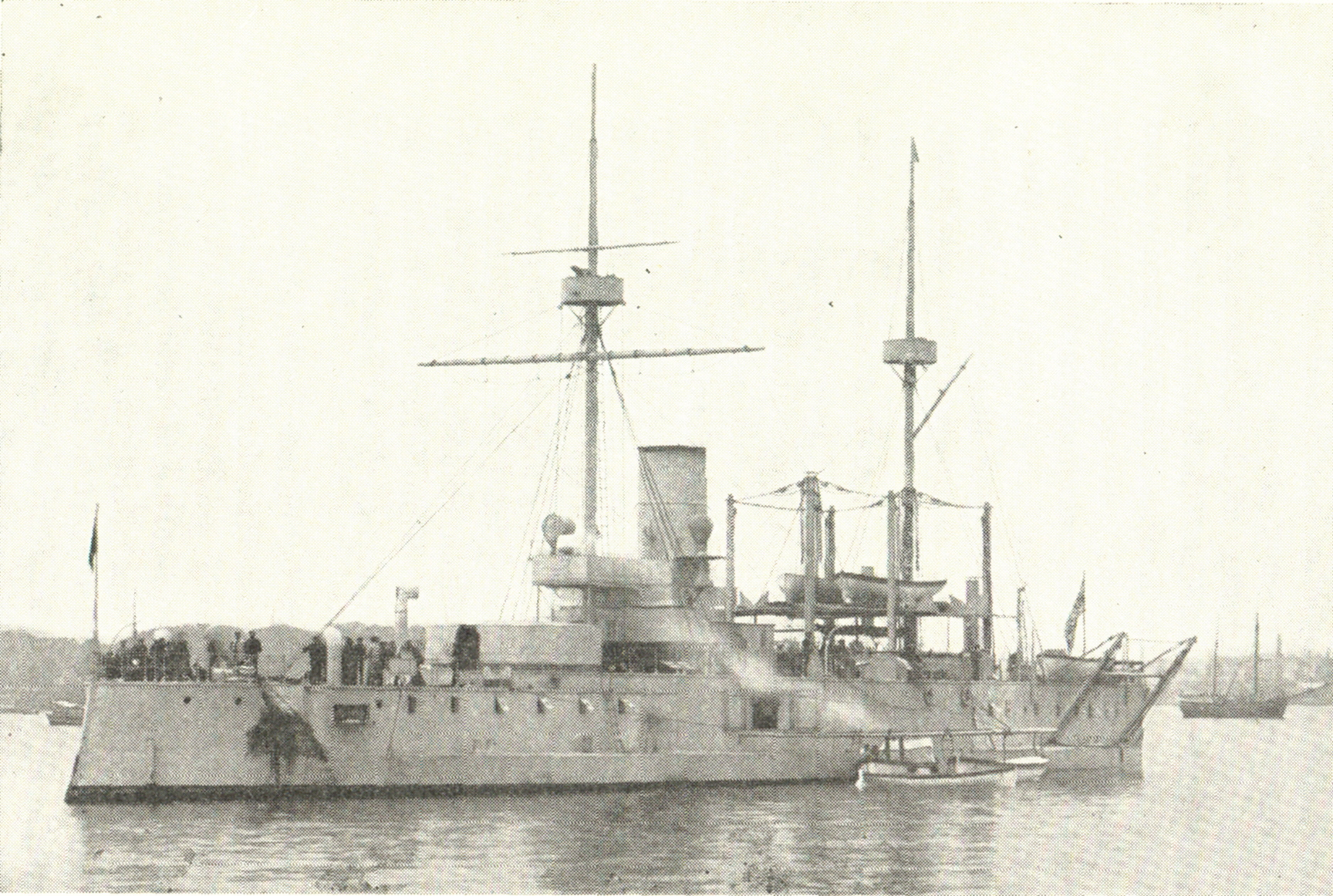
- Helgoland

History

Kingdom of Denmark
- Name: Helgoland
- Namesake: Battle of Heligoland
- Builder: Orlogsværftet, Copenhagen
- Laid down: 20 May 1876
- Launched: 9 May 1878
- Commissioned: 20 August 1879
- Decommissioned: 29 June 1907
- Fate: Scrapped, 1907

General characteristics
- Type: Barbette ironclad
- Displacement: 5,480 t (5,393 long tons)
- Length: 79.17 m (259 ft 9 in)
- Beam: 18.05 m (59 ft 3 in)
- Draft: 5.9 m (19 ft 4 in)
- Installed power: 8 cylindrical boilers; 4,000 ihp (3,000 kW)
- Propulsion: 2 shafts, 2 compound-expansion steam engines
- Speed: 13 knots (24 km/h; 15 mph)
- Range: 1,400 nmi (2,600 km; 1,600 mi) at 9 knots (17 km/h; 10 mph)
- Complement: 350
- Armament: 1 × single 305 mm (12 in) L/22; 4 × single 260 mm (10.2 in) guns; 5 × single 120 mm (4.7 in) guns
- Armour: Belt: 152–315 mm (6.0–12.4 in); Barbette: 260 mm (10.2 in); Casemate: 260 mm (10.2 in); Deck: 52 mm (2 in)

HDMS Helgoland was a coast defence barbette ironclad built for the Royal Danish Navy in the late 1870s. The ship was decommissioned in 1907 and subsequently scrapped.

== Design and description ==
Helgoland was 79.12 meters (259 ft 7 in) long overall, had a beam of 18.03 meters (59 ft 2 in) and a draft of 5.89 meters (19 ft 4 in). She displaced 5,480 metric tons (5,393 long tons) and was fitted with a ram bow. Her crew consisted of 350 officers and enlisted men.

The ship was fitted with a pair of Burmeister & Wain compound-expansion steam engines, each engine driving one propeller shaft using steam provided by eight cylindrical boilers. The engines were rated at a total of 4,500 indicated horsepower (3,400 kW) and gave the ship a speed of 13.4 knots (24.8 km/h; 15.4 mph). Helgoland carried a maximum of 224 long tons (228 t) of coal that gave her a range of 1,400 nautical miles (2,600 km; 1,600 mi) at a speed of 9 knots (17 km/h; 10 mph).

The ironclad's main battery consisted of a single 30.5 cm gun and four 26 cm guns. The Krupp 30.5 cm MRK L/22 was of the most recent hooped and jacketed construction. It was a rifled breech-loading (RBL) gun mounted in a barbette. Its caliber was 305-millimeter (12 in) and its length was 22 calibers. The four single 22-caliber 260-millimeter (10.2 in) RBL guns were placed in the corners of the armored citadel in the hull. For defense against torpedo boats, the ship was equipped with five 25-caliber 120-millimeter (4.7 in) guns. She was also fitted with two 380-millimeter (15 in) torpedo launchers.

Helogland had a complete waterline belt of wrought iron that ranged in thickness from 315 millimeters (12.4 in) amidships to 152 millimeters (6 in) at the ends of the ship. The barbette and the side of the armored citadel were protected by 260 mm of armor. The deck armor was 52 millimeters (2 in) thick while the conning tower was protected by 33-millimeter (1.3 in) armor plates.

== Construction and service ==
Helgoland, named for the 1864 Danish victory over the combined Prussian and Austro-Hungarian squadron at Battle of Heligoland during the Second Schleswig War, was laid down on 20 May 1875 by the Orlogsværftet in Copenhagen, launched on 9 May 1878 and commissioned on 20 August 1879.
