= SMS Meteor (1890) =

Aviso of the German Imperial Navy

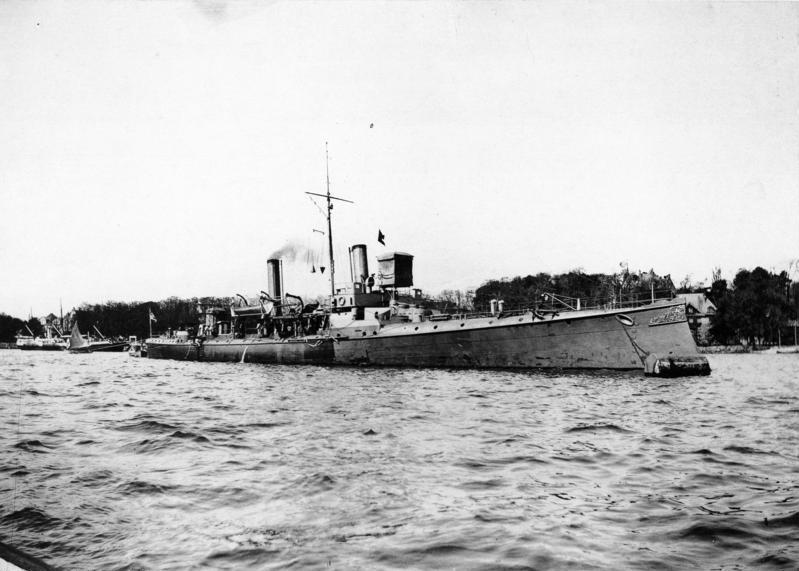
- SMS Meteor at anchor

History

German Empire
- Name: SMS Meteor
- Builder: Germaniawerft
- Laid down: December 1888
- Launched: 20 January 1890
- Commissioned: 19 May 1891
- Decommissioned: 4 October 1896
- Stricken: 24 June 1911
- Fate: Scrapped, 1919

General characteristics
- Class & type: Meteor-class aviso
- Displacement: Design: 961 t (946 long tons); Full load: 1,078 t (1,061 long tons)
- Length: 79.86 m (262 ft) o/a
- Beam: 9.56 m (31 ft 4 in)
- Draft: 3.68 m (12 ft 1 in)
- Installed power: 4 × locomotive boilers; 4,500 PS (4,400 ihp)
- Propulsion: 2 × double-expansion steam engines; 2 × screw propellers
- Speed: 20 knots (37 km/h; 23 mph)
- Range: 960 nmi (1,780 km; 1,100 mi) at 9 kn (17 km/h; 10 mph)
- Complement: 7 officers; 108 enlisted men
- Armament: 4 × 8.8 cm (3.5 in) SK L/30 guns; 3 × 35 cm (13.8 in) torpedo tubes
- Armor: Deck: 15 mm (0.59 in); Conning tower: 30 mm (1.2 in)

SMS Meteor was an aviso of the German Kaiserliche Marine (Imperial Navy) built in the late 1880s and early 1890s, the lead ship of her class that include one other vessel, Comet. Intended to screen the main fleet against attacking torpedo boats, Meteor was armed with a battery of four 8.8 cm (3.5 in) guns. Her design suffered from several defects, including excessive vibration and poor handling in heavy seas, both of which could not be corrected. These problems limited the ship's career. She served briefly as a guard ship in Kiel in 1892, as an aviso with the main fleet in 1893–1894, and as a fishery protection ship in 1895–1896. Out of service by the end of 1896, Meteor was later used as a harbor defense vessel in 1904 and then as a barracks ship from 1911 to 1919, when she was sold to ship breakers and dismantled.

== Design ==
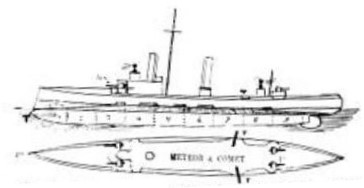
Plan and profile drawing of the Meteor class

With previous avisos built for the German fleet, the designers had attempted to build vessels that could serve as scouts for the main fleet as well as defend it against hostile torpedo boats that threatened the larger ironclad warships. The naval command decided in 1888 that the next class of avisos—the Meteor design—should focus solely on anti-torpedo boat duties. Smaller and faster than the preceding Wacht-class avisos, the Meteors were also badly unstable and poor sea boats, and they suffered from severe vibration at high speed. These defects could not be remedied, and as a result, they had short careers.

Meteor was 79.86 meters (262 ft) long overall and had a beam of 9.56 m (31.4 ft) and a maximum draft of 3.68 m (12.1 ft) forward. She displaced 961 metric tons (946 long tons) as designed and up to 1,078 t (1,061 long tons) at full combat load. Her propulsion system consisted of two vertical 3-cylinder triple expansion engines. Steam for the engines was provided by four coal-fired locomotive boilers. The ship's propulsion system was rated for 4,500 metric horsepower (4,400 ihp) and provided a top speed of 20 kn (37 km/h; 23 mph) and a range of approximately 960 nautical miles (1,780 km; 1,100 mi) at 9 kn (17 km/h; 10 mph). Meteor had a crew of 7 officers and 108 enlisted men.

As built, the ship was armed with four 8.8 cm (3.5 in) SK L/30 guns placed in single pivot mounts, two side-by-side forward, and two side-by-side aft. The guns were supplied with between 462 and 680 rounds of ammunition. Meteor also carried three 35 cm (13.8 in) torpedo tubes, one mounted submerged in the bow and the other two in deck-mounted launchers on the broadside. She was protected with a 15 mm (0.59 in) thick deck, along with 30 mm (1.2 in) of steel armor plating for the conning tower.

== Service history ==
Lithograph of Greif (center), Meteor (left), and Jagd (right) by Willy Stöwer

Work on Meteor began in December 1888 with her keel laying at the Germaniawerft shipyard in Kiel under the provisional designation "F". (Note: German warships were ordered under provisional names. Additions to the fleet were given a single letter; ships intended to replace older or lost vessels were ordered as "Ersatz (name of the ship to be replaced)".) She was launched on 20 January 1890; after completing fitting-out, dockyard workers conducted builder's trials before delivery. After these were finished, she was commissioned into the fleet on 15 May 1891. She was initially used as the flagship of the commander of the Marinestation der Ostsee (Baltic Sea Naval Station) and was stationed as a guard ship in Kiel, replacing the screw corvette Stosch in the roles. The navy had not yet conducted its own trials of the ship, however, and she was transferred to I Reserve on 30 July, her role as flagship being taken over by the torpedo training ship Blücher. Meteor returned to guard duties from 28 August to 3 October, at which point she was decommissioned to correct some defects that had been discovered during her trials, including increasing the height of her funnels by 1.5 m (4 ft 11 in) to reduce smoke interference with the aft gun crews.

Meteor was recommissioned on 20 May 1892 for another round of trials after the modifications completed the previous year. She was also assigned as the guard ship for Kiel during this period. In mid-August, she took part in the annual fleet training exercises that lasted until 26 September. During the maneuvers, she served as the flotilla leader for II Torpedo-boat Flotilla; the flotilla commander, Korvettenkapitän (KK—corvette captain) Karl Rosendahl, flew his flag aboard the ship for the duration of the exercises. Kaiser Wilhelm II boarded the ship for a short cruise in early November, and she was decommissioned again on 6 December, by which time the navy pronounced the ship's trials to be officially completed.

Meteor during her short active career

She was recommissioned on 5 April 1893 to serve as the aviso for I Division of the Maneuver Fleet from 1 May to 29 September, including during the annual maneuvers. KK Henning von Holtzendorff served as the ship's commander during this period. Beginning on 30 June 1894, she escorted the Kaiser's yacht Hohenzollern on his annual summer cruise, which went to Norway that year. While in Stavanger, Meteor suffered from machinery problems, though her crew was able to repair her engines there. The problems nevertheless led to her being replaced as the Kaiser's escort by the protected cruiser Prinzess Wilhelm. Meteor returned to Kiel for repairs, after which she served as a scout during the fleet maneuvers. She was decommissioned again on 30 September.

Meteor returned to active service on 19 March 1895 for fishery protection duties along Germany's North Sea coast. These operations were interrupted from 14 to 22 June, when she attended the ceremonial opening of the Kaiser Wilhelm Canal. On 27 August, she was transferred to the Maneuver Fleet for the annual exercises. Decommissioned again on 24 September for the winter months, Meteor was recommissioned on 18 March 1896 for fishery protection. She waited in Dover, Great Britain, from 17 to 24 April for Prince Heinrich to arrive to take his new sailing yacht back to Germany. She then returned to the fisheries patrol, where British fishers were repeatedly violating German territorial waters off Norderney, forcing Meteor to intervene and drive them off. At the end of May, Meteor began to serve as a training ship for engine and boiler room crews in addition to her patrol duties. She met British and Dutch fishery patrol vessels in Lowestoft, Great Britain, from 3 to 6 July. Beginning on 9 August, Meteor took part in fleet maneuvers for the last time; these lasted until early September, when she returned to fishery patrols. Decommissioned on 4 October, the ship's active career was now over.

The ship's poor seaworthiness militated against further use with the fleet. And she was not particularly suited to the fishery protection duties that had occupied much of her active career, since her small size prevented her from carrying sufficient coal to remain at sea for long periods; she was replaced in that role by the old aviso Zieten of 1876 vintage. Meteor was reclassified as a light cruiser in 1899 and was transferred to the list of harbor ships on 3 May 1903. Beginning on 3 May 1904, she was assigned as a harbor guard ship. Struck from the naval register on 24 June 1911, she was reduced to a barracks ship based in Kiel, where she remained for the next eight years, including during World War I, when she was occupied by U-boat crews. After the German defeat, the ship was sold for scrapping in 1919. Meteor thereafter was broken up in Rendsburg.
