= SMS Jagd =

Aviso of the German Imperial Navy

- SMS Jagd

History

German Empire
- Name: SMS Jagd
- Builder: AG Weser
- Laid down: 1887
- Launched: 7 July 1888
- Commissioned: 25 June 1889
- Decommissioned: 11 August 1901
- Stricken: 14 May 1910
- Fate: Scrapped, 1920

General characteristics
- Class & type: Wacht-class aviso
- Displacement: Design: 1,246 t (1,226 long tons); Full load: 1,499 t (1,475 long tons)
- Length: 85.8 m (281 ft 6 in) o/a
- Beam: 9.66 m (31 ft 8 in)
- Draft: 3.74 m (12 ft 3 in)
- Installed power: 4 × locomotive boilers; 4,000 PS (3,900 ihp)
- Propulsion: 2 × double-expansion steam engines; 2 × screw propellers
- Speed: 19 knots (35 km/h; 22 mph)
- Range: 2,440 nmi (4,520 km; 2,810 mi) at 9 knots (17 km/h; 10 mph)
- Complement: 7 officers; 134 enlisted men
- Armament: 3 × 10.5 cm (4.1 in) K L/35 guns; 3 × 35 cm (13.8 in) torpedo tubes
- Armor: Deck: 10 mm (0.39 in); Conning tower: 25 mm (0.98 in)

SMS Jagd was an aviso of the Imperial German Navy, the second and final member of the Wacht class. She had one sister ship, Wacht. Jagd was laid down in 1887 at the AG Weser shipyard, launched in July 1888, and commissioned in June 1889. She served in the German fleet for the next fifteen years, until she was withdrawn from active duty in 1904. Thereafter, she was used as a harbor ship. In 1910, she was stricken from the naval register and hulked. She was later used as a torpedo training platform until 1920, when she was sold for scrapping.

== Design ==
Plan and profile of the Wacht class

With the selection of General Leo von Caprivi to replace the former chief of the Kaiserliche Admiralität (Imperial Admiralty), Albrecht von Stosch, in 1883, the navy began to experiment more seriously with torpedo-armed warships along the lines of the Jeune École. Caprivi was a proponent of cheaper torpedo boats, and he directed that future avisos should forsake size and gun power in favor of higher speed and torpedo armament. The Wacht class was the first design prepared in accordance with Caprivi's directives, and it proved to be a failure, owing to poor seakeeping as a result of its smaller size, and a gun battery that was insufficient to allow them to engage comparable vessels in other fleets.

Jagd was 85.5 meters (281 ft) long overall and had a beam of 9.66 m (31.7 ft) and a maximum draft of 3.74 m (12.3 ft) forward. She displaced 1,246 metric tons (1,226 long tons) as designed and up to 1,499 t (1,475 long tons) at full load. Her propulsion system consisted of two angled 3-cylinder triple expansion engines. Steam for the engines was provided by four coal-fired locomotive boilers. The ship's propulsion system was rated for 4,000 metric horsepower (3,900 ihp) and provided a top speed of 19 knots (35 km/h; 22 mph) and a range of approximately 2,860 nautical miles (5,300 km; 3,290 mi) at 10 knots (19 km/h; 12 mph). Jagd had a crew of 7 officers and 134 enlisted men.

As built, the ship was armed with three 10.5 cm (4.1 in) K L/35 gun placed in single pivot mounts. The guns were supplied with a total of 180 rounds of ammunition. Jagd also carried three 35 cm (13.8 in) torpedo tubes, one mounted submerged in the bow and the other two in deck-mounted launchers on the broadside. In 1891, four 8.8 cm (3.5 in) SK L/30 guns in single mounts were installed in place of the 10.5 cm guns. The ship was the first German aviso to carry armor: a 10 mm (0.39 in) thick deck, along with 25 mm (0.98 in) of armor plating for the conning tower.

== Service history ==
=== Construction – 1894 ===
Lithograph of Greif (center), Meteor (left), and Jagd (right) by Willy Stöwer

Jagd, ordered as a replacement for the old paddle steamer aviso Pommerania using the contract name "Ersatz Pommerania", (Note: German warships were ordered under provisional names. Additions to the fleet were given a single letter; ships intended to replace older or lost vessels were ordered as "Ersatz (name of the ship to be replaced)".) was laid down at the AG Weser shipyard in Bremen in late 1887. She was christened at her launching ceremony by Konteradmiral (Rear Admiral) Karl August Deinhard on 7 July 1888. After fitting-out work was completed, the ship was commissioned for sea trials on 25 June 1889 under the command of Korvettenkapitän (Corvette Captain) Max Piraly, which ended on 6 April in Kiel, where she was decommissioned on 6 August.

She was recommissioned on 15 April for additional trials that lasted until the end of June. She then escorted Hohenzollern, the yacht of Kaiser Wilhelm II, during his summer cruise to Norwegian waters. After returning to Germany, she was stationed in Kiel as a guard ship from 1 August to 11 September. The ship then moved to Wilhelmshaven, where she was decommissioned on 3 October, thereafter receiving her new gun battery of 8.8 cm guns.

The ship returned to service in 1891, initially as a guard ship in Wilhelmshaven, during which time she conducted a cruise along Germany's North Sea coast. She thereafter join Hohenzollern for a visit to Amsterdam, Netherlands and then to ports in Norway. During the annual fleet maneuvers held in August and September, she served with the fleet and was tasked with relaying signals between units. She took part in the 1892 fleet maneuvers and beginning on 13 October, she returned to guard duties in Wilhelmshaven. The year 1893 passed uneventfully, and she was decommissioned for a modernization that included replacing her boilers at the Kaiserliche Werft (Imperial Shipyard) in Wilhelmshaven. The work lasted into 1894, and upon completion she remained in reserve.

=== 1895–1920 ===
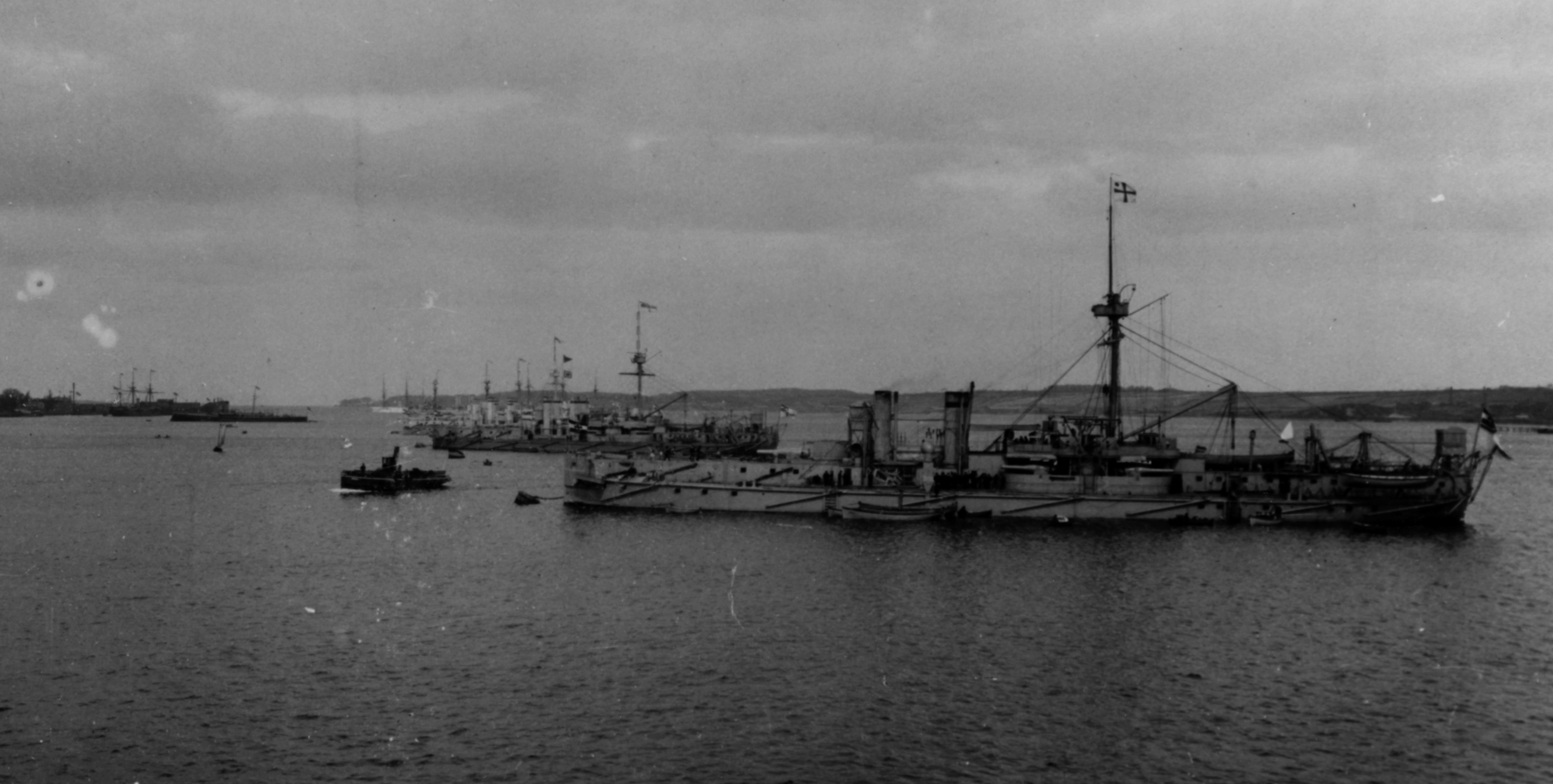
The German fleet at anchor in 1896; the four Sachsen-class ironclads are at right and either Jagd or Wacht is at anchor in front (left distance) (Note: Not the vessel underway directly ahead of the ironclads.)

Jagd was recommissioned on 8 March 1895 under the command of KK Eduard Holzhauer, and in late April, she was the first vessel to pass through the Kaiser Wilhelm Canal, before the canal officially opened. She was sent through the canal to determine if it was ready for use; the canal was officially opened on 20 June. Jagd thereafter served with the Maneuver Squadron as an aviso for the rest of the year, and in September, Holzhauer was replaced by KK Carl Friedrich. The ship was then decommissioned in Wilhelmshaven on 19 December. Recommissioned in March 1896 under KK Guido von Usedom, she served in the same role, albeit for what was now I Squadron, for the duration of 1896; during the year, the squadron visited the Netherlands and Norway before being decommissioned in September. KK Hermann Lilie relieved Usedom in September and remained in command during the period in reserve. Recommissioned on 5 March 1897, she again took her place with the squadron, taking part in the fleet maneuvers. Following their conclusion, Lilie left the ship, his place being taken by KK Fritz Sommerwerck. Unlike previous years, she remained in commission through the winter and was withdrawn from service again on 8 March 1898.

The ship next saw active service on 27 September 1899, when she was recommissioned to replace her sister ship Wacht as the aviso for I Squadron. She remained in service through 1900, though after the fleet maneuvers she was used for fishery protection duties in the North Sea from 14 October to 23 November. She underwent an overhaul in January 1901, and from 28 January to 7 February, she joined the unit that was sent to represent Germany during the funeral ceremonies for Queen Victoria of Britain, who was Wilhelm II's grandmother. KK Hugo von Cotzhausen took command of the ship in March. Following the grounding of the battleship Kaiser Friedrich III off the Adlergrund north of Rügen, Jagd was used to survey the area. Following the conclusion of this work, the navy conducted an examination of Jagd in mid-July and determined that the ship was in such poor condition that she was not worth refitting. She was accordingly decommissioned for the last time on 11 August.

Jagd c. 1904

Jagd was transferred to the list of harbor ships on 3 May 1904, thereafter being used as a harbor ship. She was struck from the naval register on 14 May 1910 and subsequently hulked. She was based in Friedrichsort outside Kiel and used as a firing platform for torpedo training until she was broken up for scrap in 1920 at Rüstringen.
