= SMS Comet (1892) =

German Imperial Navy dispatch boat (1892–1896)

- Comet in port, date unknown

History

German Empire
- Name: SMS Comet
- Builder: AG Vulcan
- Laid down: November 1891
- Launched: 15 November 1892
- Commissioned: 29 April 1893
- Decommissioned: 2 May 1896
- Stricken: 24 June 1911
- Fate: Scrapped, 1921

General characteristics
- Class & type: Meteor-class aviso
- Displacement: Design: 992 t (976 long tons); Full load: 1,117 t (1,099 long tons)
- Length: 79.86 m (262 ft 0 in) o/a
- Beam: 9.56 m (31 ft 4 in)
- Draft: 3.68 m (12 ft 1 in)
- Installed power: 4 × locomotive boilers; 5,000 PS (4,900 ihp)
- Propulsion: 2 × double-expansion steam engines; 2 × screw propellers
- Speed: 19.5 knots (36.1 km/h; 22.4 mph)
- Range: 960 nmi (1,780 km; 1,100 mi) at 9 kn (17 km/h; 10 mph)
- Complement: 7 officers; 108 enlisted men
- Armament: 4 × 8.8 cm (3.5 in) SK L/30 guns; 3 × 35 cm (13.8 in) torpedo tubes
- Armor: Deck: 15 mm (0.59 in); Conning tower: 30 mm (1.2 in)

SMS Comet was an aviso of the German Kaiserliche Marine (Imperial Navy) built in the early 1890s, second and final member of the Meteor class that include one other vessel, Meteor. Intended to screen the main fleet against attacking torpedo boats, Comet was armed with a battery of four 8.8 cm (3.5 in) guns. Her design suffered from several defects, including excessive vibration and poor handling in heavy seas, both of which could not be corrected. These problems limited the ship's career to several periods of sea trials as the navy attempted to remedy the problems that plagued the ship. They had no success, and Comet was instead decommissioned in mid-1896 and was later converted into a storage hulk for naval mines. She was ultimately broken up in 1921.

== Design ==
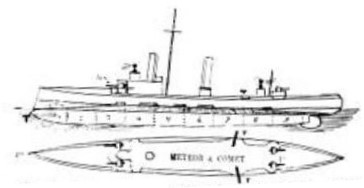
Plan and profile drawing of the Meteor class

With previous avisos built for the German fleet, the designers had attempted to build vessels that could serve as scouts for the main fleet as well as defend it against hostile torpedo boats that threatened the larger ironclad warships. The naval command decided in 1888 that the next class of avisos—the Meteor design—should focus solely on anti-torpedo boat duties. Smaller and faster than the preceding Wacht-class avisos, the Meteors were also badly unstable and poor sea boats, and they suffered from severe vibration at high speed. These defects could not be remedied, and as a result, they had short careers.

Comet was 79.86 meters (262.0 ft) long overall and had a beam of 9.58 m (31.4 ft) and a maximum draft of 3.68 m (12.1 ft) forward. She displaced 992 metric tons (976 long tons) as designed and up to 1,117 t (1,099 long tons) at full combat load. Her propulsion system consisted of two vertical 3-cylinder triple expansion engines. Steam for the engines was provided by four coal-fired locomotive boilers. The ship's propulsion system was rated for 5,000 metric horsepower (4,900 ihp) and provided a top speed of 19.5 kn (36.1 km/h; 22.4 mph) and a range of approximately 960 nautical miles (1,780 km; 1,100 mi) at 9 kn (17 km/h; 10 mph). Comet had a crew of 7 officers and 108 enlisted men.

As built, the ship was armed with four 8.8 cm (3.5 in) SK L/30 guns placed in single pivot mounts, two side-by-side forward, and two side-by-side aft. The guns were supplied with between 462 and 680 rounds of ammunition. Comet also carried three 35 cm (13.8 in) torpedo tubes, one mounted submerged in the bow and the other two in deck-mounted launchers on the broadside. She was protected with a 15 mm (0.59 in) thick deck, along with 30 mm (1.2 in) of steel armor plating for the conning tower.

== Service history ==
The contract for Comet was awarded to the AG Vulcan shipyard in Stettin under the provisional name "G", (Note: German warships were ordered under provisional names. Additions to the fleet were given a single letter; ships intended to replace older or lost vessels were ordered as "Ersatz (name of the ship to be replaced)".) but her keel laying was delayed until November 1891 so the navy could gather experience from the initial trials of Comet's sister ship, Meteor. The commander of the Kaiserliche Werft (Imperial Shipyard) in Kiel, Otto von Diederichs performed the christening at her launching ceremony on 15 November 1892. After completing fitting-out, the navy conducted acceptance trials that concluded on 14 April 1893. The ship then steamed to Kiel, where she was commissioned on 29 April. She conducted further sea trials until 6 July, when she was decommissioned for the year.

Comet was recommissioned briefly in 1894, serving briefly from 5 to 30 June under the command of Korvettenkapitän (corvette captain) Henning von Holtzendorff. The ship remained out of service through 1895, though modifications were made in an attempt to correct some of her defects. She was recommissioned on 22 January 1896 for another round of sea trials that lasted until 26 April. These were conducted in the North Sea, under the command of Kapitänleutnant (captain lieutenant) Ludwig Bruch. The ship was transferred to Wilhelmshaven on 2 May, where she was decommissioned again. Relocated to Kiel the following year, she saw no further active service. As with her sister, Comet's career was limited by the serious defects in her design.

An order from the naval command reclassified Comet as a light cruiser on 21 February 1899, and in mid-1901, she was transferred to Danzig, along with three other old ships. On 3 May 1904, she was transferred to the list of harbor ships, and she was employed as a harbor defense ship in Danzig beginning at the same time. The ship was struck from the naval register on 24 June 1911 and in June 1914, she was towed to Emden, where she was used as a mine storage hulk to support the light cruiser Arcona. Comet was broken up in Hamburg in 1921.
