= SMS Wacht =

Aviso of the German Imperial Navy

Coordinates: 54.6833°N 13.5167°E

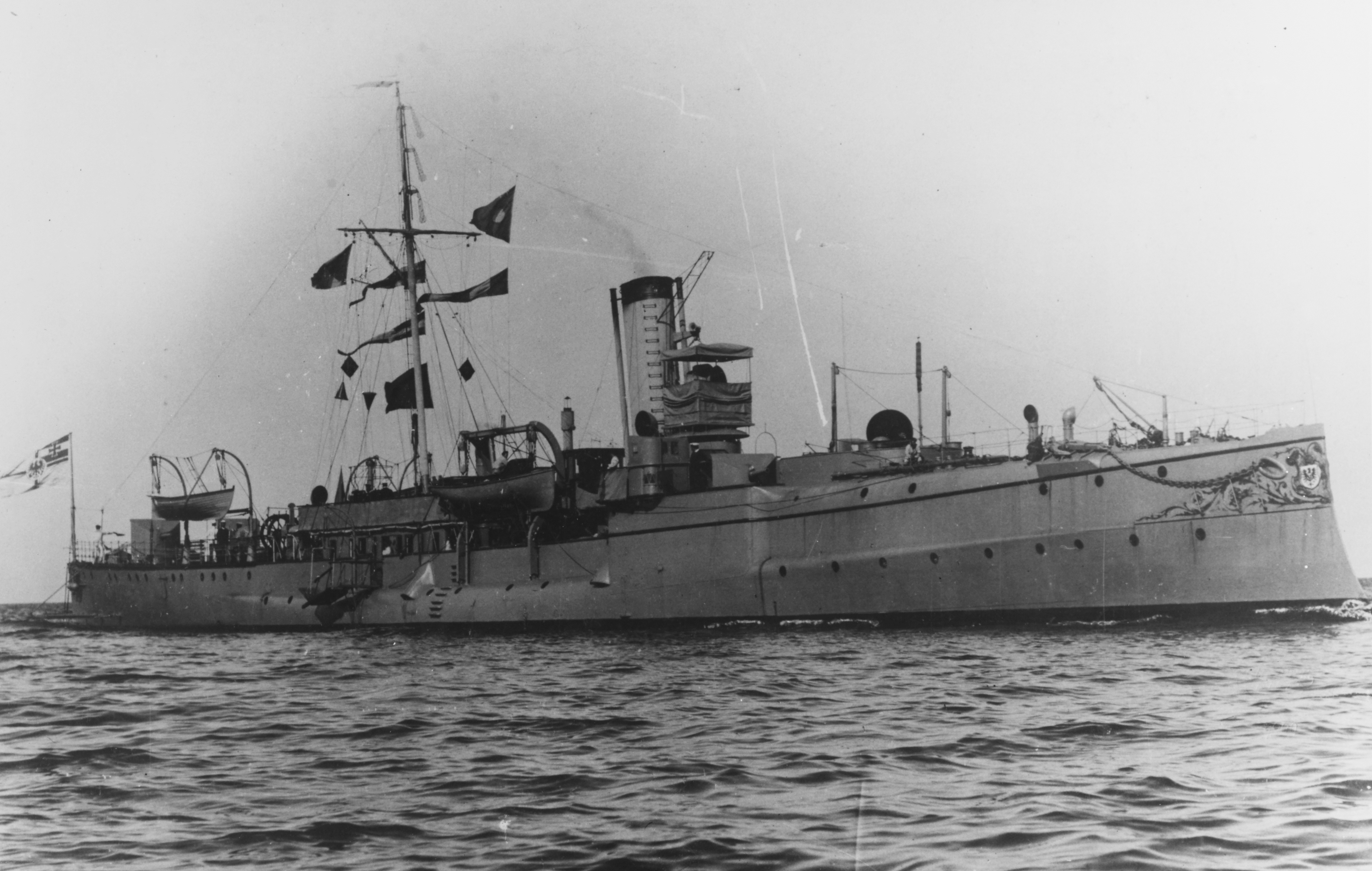
- Wacht in 1899

History

German Empire
- Name: SMS Wacht
- Builder: AG Weser
- Laid down: August 1886
- Launched: 27 August 1887
- Commissioned: 9 August 1888
- Fate: Sunk in collision 4 September 1901

General characteristics
- Class & type: Wacht-class aviso
- Displacement: Design: 1,246 t (1,226 long tons); Full load: 1,499 t (1,475 long tons)
- Length: 85.8 m (281 ft 6 in) o/a
- Beam: 9.66 m (31 ft 8 in)
- Draft: 3.74 m (12 ft 3 in)
- Installed power: 4 × locomotive boilers; 4,000 PS (3,900 ihp)
- Propulsion: 2 × double-expansion steam engines; 2 × screw propellers
- Speed: 19 knots (35 km/h; 22 mph)
- Range: 2,440 nmi (4,520 km; 2,810 mi) at 9 knots (17 km/h; 10 mph)
- Complement: 7 officers; 134 enlisted men
- Armament: 3 × 10.5 cm (4.1 in) K L/35 guns; 3 × 35 cm (13.8 in) torpedo tubes
- Armor: Deck: 10 mm (0.39 in); Conning tower: 25 mm (0.98 in)

SMS Wacht was an aviso of the Imperial German Navy, the lead ship of her class. She had one sister ship, Jagd. Wacht was built by the AG Weser shipyard; she was laid down in 1886, launched in August 1887, and commissioned in August 1888. She served in the active fleet through the 1890s and participated in numerous training exercises. Her career was cut short on 4 September 1901, when she collided with the old ironclad SMS Sachsen. The latter's ram bow holed Wacht under the waterline and caused her to rapidly sink. Her crew was safely rescued, however, and there were no casualties.

== Design ==
Plan and profile of the Wacht class

With the selection of General Leo von Caprivi to replace the former chief of the Kaiserliche Admiralität (Imperial Admiralty), Albrecht von Stosch, in 1883, the navy began to experiment more seriously with torpedo-armed warships along the lines of the Jeune École. Caprivi was a proponent of cheaper torpedo boats, and he directed that future avisos should forsake size and gun power in favor of higher speed and torpedo armament. The Wacht class was the first design prepared in accordance with Caprivi's directives, and it proved to be a failure, owing to poor seakeeping as a result of its smaller size, and a gun battery that was insufficient to allow them to engage comparable vessels in other fleets.

Wacht was 85.5 meters (281 ft) long overall and had a beam of 9.66 m (31.7 ft) and a maximum draft of 3.74 m (12.3 ft) forward. She displaced 1,246 metric tons (1,226 long tons) as designed and up to 1,499 t (1,475 long tons) at full load. Her propulsion system consisted of two angled 3-cylinder triple expansion engines. Steam for the engines was provided by four coal-fired locomotive boilers. The ship's propulsion system was rated for 4,000 metric horsepower (3,900 ihp) and provided a top speed of 19 knots (35 km/h; 22 mph) and a range of approximately 2,860 nautical miles (5,300 km; 3,290 mi) at 10 knots (19 km/h; 12 mph). Wacht had a crew of 7 officers and 134 enlisted men.

As built, the ship was armed with three 10.5 cm (4.1 in) K L/35 guns placed in single pivot mounts. The guns were supplied with a total of 180 rounds of ammunition. Wacht also carried three 35 cm (13.8 in) torpedo tubes, one mounted submerged in the bow and the other two in deck-mounted launchers on the broadside. In 1891, four 8.8 cm (3.5 in) SK L/30 guns in single mounts were installed in place of the 10.5 cm guns. The ship was the first German aviso to carry armor: a 10 mm (0.39 in) thick deck, along with 25 mm (0.98 in) of armor plating for the conning tower.

== Service history ==
=== Construction – 1892 ===
Wacht early in her career

The keel for Wacht was laid down in August 1886 at the AG Weser shipyard in Bremen under the provisional name "E". (Note: German warships were ordered under provisional names. Additions to the fleet were given a single letter; ships intended to replace older or lost vessels were ordered as "Ersatz (name of the ship to be replaced)".) She was launched on 27 August 1887 and Vizeadmiral (Vice Admiral) Alexander von Monts, the chief of the Marinestation der Nordsee (North Sea Naval Station) christened the ship. In early 1888, she was transferred to Wilhelmshaven, where her armament was installed, and she was commissioned on 9 August to begin sea trials. These concluded on 13 December in Wilhelmshaven. She was temporarily assigned to the newly created Reserve Division of the North Sea over the winter of 1888–1889 before being transferred to Kiel on 1 May to begin engine trials, after which she was assigned to the Maneuver Squadron. During training exercises with the squadron, Wacht suffered a burst boiler tube on 20 June that forced her to return to port for repairs. In early August, she joined the squadron for a visit to Britain, arriving back in Wilhelmshaven on 31 August. The fleet then conducted its annual large-scale maneuvers. After the maneuvers ended in September, Korvettenkapitän (KK—Corvette Captain) Friedrich von Baudissin took command of the vessel.

Late in the year, Wacht joined a squadron of four old ironclads—Kaiser, Deutschland, Friedrich der Grosse, and Preussen that escorted Kaiser Wilhelm II and Kaiserin Augusta Victoria aboard their yacht Hohenzollern to Greece for the wedding of Princess Sophie, the Kaiser's sister, to Constantine, then the crown prince of the Kingdom of Greece. Prince Heinrich also cruised with the squadron aboard the protected cruiser Irene. During the cruise, the Germans visited numerous ports in the Mediterranean, including state visits to Italy, the Ottoman Empire, followed by the Austro-Hungarian Empire. While in Trieste in Austria-Hungary, the squadron was present for a naval review for the Austro-Hungarian Kaiser Franz Joseph I in Muggia. Wacht developed boiler problems that necessitated repairs at the naval arsenal at Pola; she remained there until 29 January 1890, when she was able to get underway again. She met the rest of the squadron in Malta on 1 February, but left for home independently, arriving in Wilhelmshaven on 22 February, while the rest of the squadron remained in the Mediterranean until April. Wacht had in the meantime been decommissioned there on 6 March.

Wacht in 1888

While out of service, the ship underwent a thorough overhaul and had her gun armament replaced. On 6 October 1891, she was recommissioned for sea trials that lasted until the end of February 1892; during this period, her commander was KK Hermann da Fonseca-Wollheim. She was assigned to II Division of the Maneuver Squadron on 8 March and KK Ludwig Borckenhagen relieved Fonseca-Wollheim, Wacht thereafter taking part in exercises in the North Sea off the coast of Norway. She was detached from the unit to escort Hohenzollern from 4 to 8 June while Wilhelm II visited Tsar Nicholas II of Russia. Later in the year, the ship had a minor collision with the artillery training ship Mars. Borckenhagen left the ship in September and Wacht was decommissioned on 12 October.

=== 1893–1901 ===
Wacht was recommissioned on 13 January 1893, initially serving as a training ship for engine and boiler room crews for torpedo boats. Kapitänleutnant (Captain Lieutenant) Alfred Ehrlich commanded the ship during the year. In early March, she was reassigned to serve as a flotilla leader for torpedo boats, and in mid-April, she was once again detached to escort Hohenzollern, though this was the new yacht of that name, while it was being taken from Swinemünde to Kiel. While on the way, the vessels encountered the Flensburg-flagged merchant ship SS Electra that had run aground and Wacht pulled her free and towed er to Kiel. Ten days later, the navy established I Torpedo-boat Flotilla, based in Kiel; Wacht served as the flotilla leader and flagship of KK Gustav Schmidt. The unit consisted of two divisions and included twelve torpedo boats in total. The vessels conducted training maneuvers over the next two months and in early July, Wacht cruised with the Maneuver Squadron in the North Sea. The annual fleet maneuvers were held from 20 August to 23 September in the North and Baltic Seas, and upon their conclusion, I Torpedo-boat Flotilla was dissolved for the year. On 27 September, Wacht accompanied Hohenzollern on her sea trials that included visits to Gothenburg, Karlskrona, and Christiansand in Sweden–Norway. Wacht then returned to Wilhelmshaven, where she was decommissioned on 11 October.

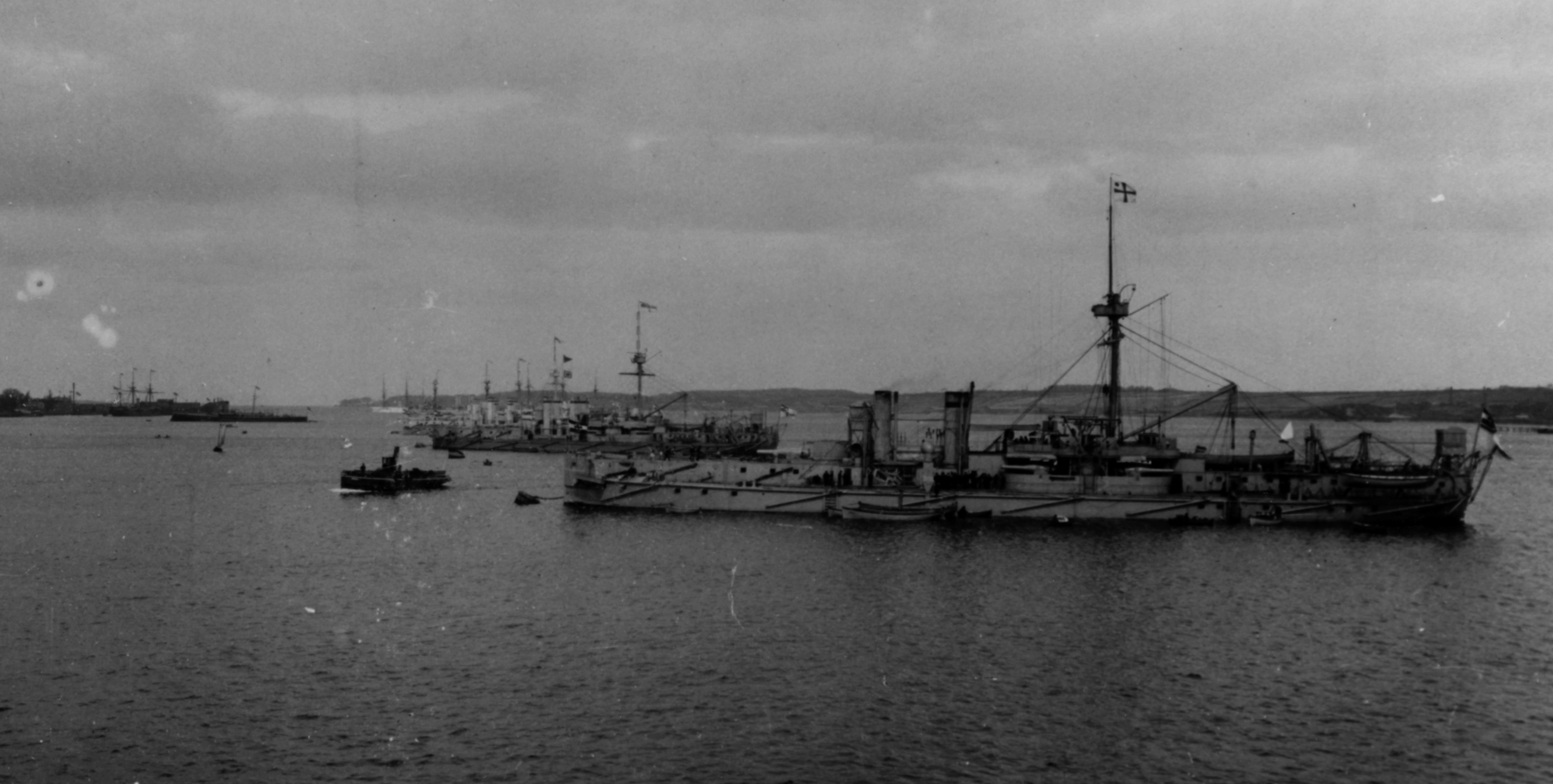
The German fleet at anchor in 1896; the four Sachsen-class ironclads are at right and either Wacht or Jagd is at anchor in front (left distance) (Note: Not the vessel underway directly ahead of the ironclads.)

In 1894, Wacht was assigned to II Division of the Maneuver Squadron; during this period, the ships conducted a lengthy cruise in the North Sea, visiting ports in Norway and the Shetland Islands from 3 April to late June. While steaming out of Kiel on 2 July, Wacht was accidentally rammed by the ironclad Deutschland. Wacht had to enter the Kaiserliche Werft (Imperial Shipyard) in Kiel for repairs that lasted until 23 July. She took part in the annual fleet maneuvers from 19 August to 21 September, after which she traded assignments with the aviso Pfeil, which had been the aviso for I Division. At the same time, KK Eduard Holzhauer took command of the vessel. Wacht did not remain in service with the unit long, owing to the poor condition of her engines, and she was decommissioned in Wilhelmshaven on 8 December for repairs.

The ship remained out of service until 18 March 1896, when she was recommissioned under the command of KK Carl Friedrich, being assigned to II Division eight days later; by this time, the Maneuver Squadron had been renamed I Squadron. The ships embarked on a cruise to the Netherlands and Norway that lasted until the end of the May. Squadron exercises followed in June and July and the fleet maneuvers were held from 9 August to 15 September. During these exercises on 5 September, Wacht damaged her screws in a collision with the torpedo boat D5, forcing her to return to Kiel for repairs, though she was able to take part in the final stage of the maneuvers in the North Sea. She thereafter cruised through the Kattegat in mid-December to return to Kiel, where Friedrich left the ship.

On 1 January 1897, her crew was reduced, though it was replenished on 1 March to take the ship back to Wilhelmshaven in 1897, where on 4 May she was decommissioned again. During that brief period in commission, KK Otto Mandt commanded the vessel. While out of service, she was reclassified as a "Kleiner Kreuzer" (small cruiser) on 27 February 1899; she was recommissioned on 6 April to replace the aviso Greif in II Division. While on maneuvers at the end of the month, she damaged one of her screws. Squadron exercises followed in July and in August, the annual fleet maneuvers began. Wacht served as a fleet scout during the exercises until 12 September, when she suffered a boiler explosion that killed four men and injured another five. The ironclad Bayern towed her to Kiel for temporary repairs before she was transferred to Wilhelmshaven. There, she was decommissioned on 27 September.

=== Loss ===
Wacht was recommissioned on 11 August 1901 under the command of KK Hugo von Cotzhausen and was assigned to I Scouting Group six days later. The unit operated with II Squadron in the North Sea in August, and on the last day of the month, the fleet maneuvers began in the Baltic. While the ships were steaming through Danzig Bay on 4 September, the fleet commander ordered Wacht and the small cruiser Hela to pass from the seaward side of the line to the other so that signals from the ships could be relayed to shore. Wacht attempted to pass between the ironclads Sachsen and Württemberg but Wacht's helmsman misjudged the distance and passed too closely in front of Sachsen. Sachsen immediately attempted to reverse course to avoid ramming the ship, but the two vessels collided. Sachsen's ram bow tore a large hole in Wacht's port side, which began to slowly sink. The battleship Weissenburg attempted to tow Wacht to shallow water, but several of Wacht's internal bulkheads collapsed under the strain and the ship quickly sank. Nevertheless, her crew was taken off safely; neither ship suffered any casualties. The navy later attempted to raise the ship, which had sunk at a depth of more than 40 m (130 ft), but the efforts proved fruitless. A court martial was held for Cotzhausen on 8 October, who was acquitted of any wrong-doing in the accident.
