= SMS Sachsen (1877) =

Armored corvette of the German Imperial Navy

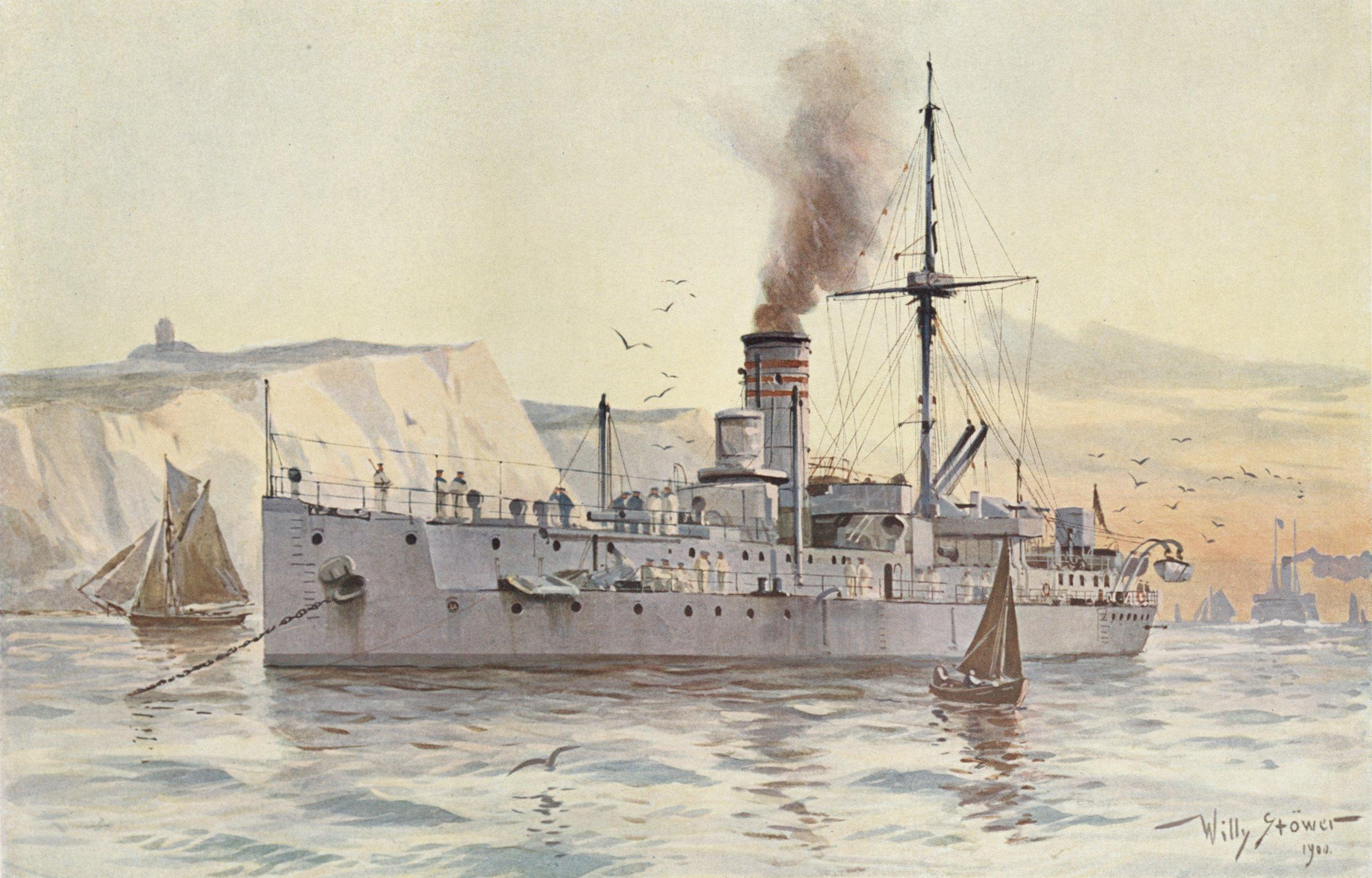
- Painting by Willy Stöwer (1900)

History

German Empire
- Name: SMS Sachsen
- Builder: A.G. Vulcan in Stettin
- Laid down: April 1875
- Launched: 21 July 1877
- Commissioned: 20 October 1878
- Decommissioned: 3 February 1902
- Stricken: 19 February 1910
- Fate: Sold for scrap, 5 May 1919

General characteristics
- Class & type: Sachsen-class ironclad
- Displacement: 7,677 t (7,556 long tons; 8,462 short tons)
- Length: 98.2 m (322 ft 2 in)
- Beam: 18.4 m (60 ft 4 in)
- Draft: 6.32 m (20 ft 9 in)
- Installed power: 8 × Dürr boilers; 4,917 ihp (3,667 kW)
- Propulsion: 2 × single-expansion steam engines; 2 × screw propellers
- Speed: 13.6 knots (25.2 km/h; 15.7 mph)
- Complement: 32 officers; 285 enlisted men
- Armament: 6 × 26 cm (10.2 in) L/22 guns; 6 × 8.7 cm (3.4 in) guns; 8 × 3.7 cm (1.5 in) guns
- Armor: Belt: 203–254 mm (8–10 in); Deck: 50–75 mm (2–3 in)

SMS Sachsen (Note: "SMS" stands for "Seiner Majestät Schiff", or "His Majesty's Ship".) was the lead ship of her class of four ironclads of the German Kaiserliche Marine (Imperial Navy). Her sisterships were Bayern, Württemberg, and Baden. Sachsen was built in the AG Vulcan shipyard in Stettin. She was laid down in April 1875, launched on 21 July 1877, and commissioned on 21 October 1878. The ship was armed with a main battery of six 26 cm (10.2 in) guns in individual open mounts.

Sachsen was built when the German navy was primarily concerned with coastal defense against either French or Russian fleets. The ship participated in routine fleet maneuvers for the duration of her active career. On her last such fleet exercise, in 1901, she accidentally rammed and sank the aviso Wacht. The following year, Sachsen was placed in reserve, and in 1911, she was used as a target hulk for the fleet. The ship was eventually broken up for scrap in 1919, following the German defeat in World War I.

== Design ==
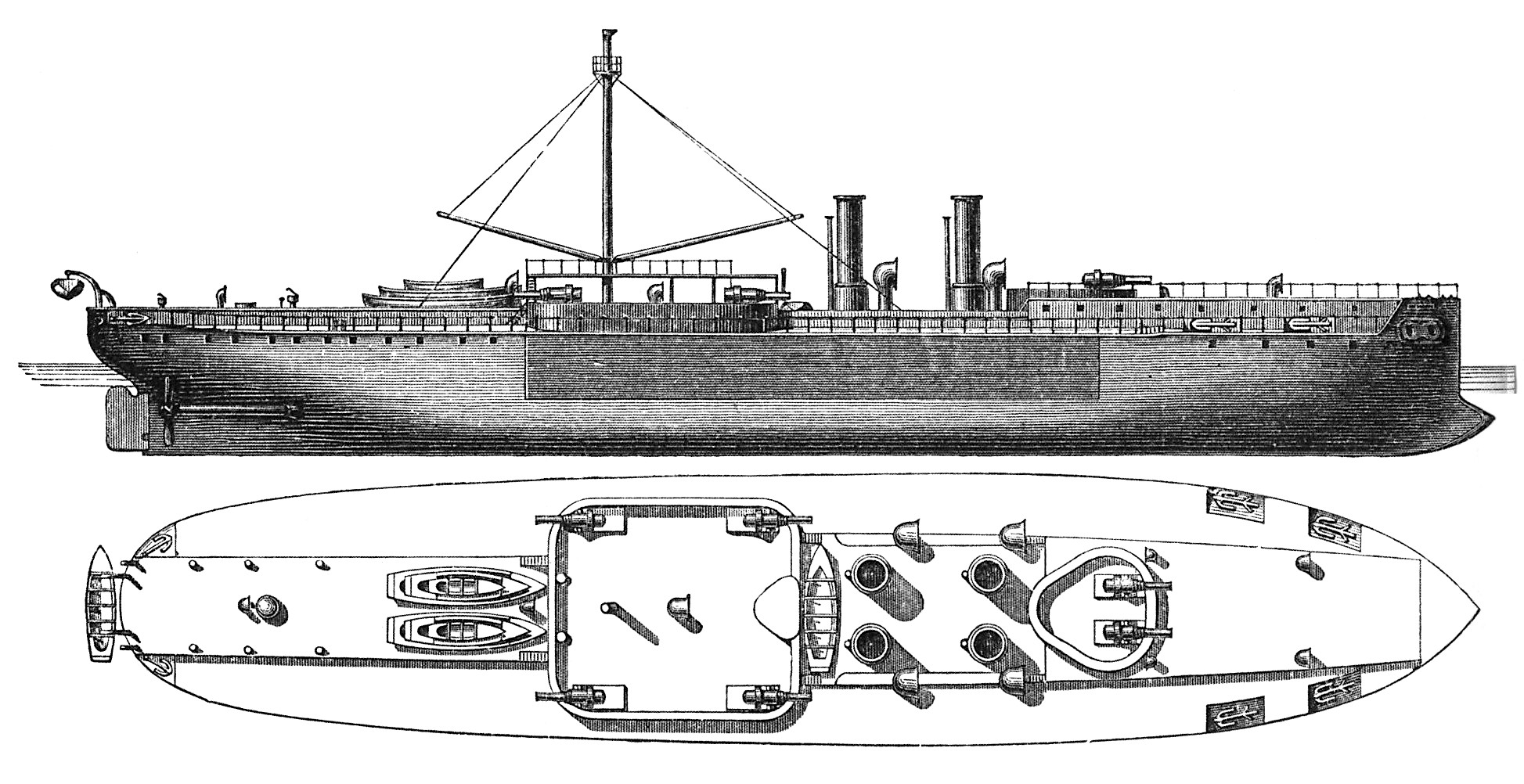
Plan and profile drawing of Sachsen

The Sachsen class was the first group of capital ships built under the tenure of General Albrecht von Stosch, the first Chief of the Imperial Admiralty. Stosch favored a coastal defense strategy for the German fleet, and the Sachsens were intended to operate from fortified ports, from which they could sortie to attack blockading fleets. They proved to be controversial in service, as critics pointed out their poor seakeeping, tendency to roll in heavy seas, and low speed compared to earlier armored frigates. She was the first large, armored warship built for the German navy that relied entirely on engines for propulsion.

The ship was 98.2 m (322 ft 2 in) long overall and had a beam of 18.4 m (60 ft 4 in) and a draft of 6.32 m (20 ft 9 in) forward. Sachsen was powered by two 3-cylinder single-expansion steam engines, which were supplied with steam by eight coal-fired Dürr boilers. The boilers were vented into four funnels in an unusual square arrangement. The ship's top speed was 13.6 knots (25.2 km/h; 15.7 mph), at 4,917 metric horsepower (4,850 ihp). Her standard complement consisted of 32 officers and 285 enlisted men, though while serving as a squadron flagship this was augmented by another 7 officers and 34 men.

She was armed with a main battery of six 26 cm (10.2 in) guns, two of which were single-mounted in an open barbette forward of the conning tower and the remaining four mounted amidships, also on single mounts in an open barbette. As built, the ship was also equipped with six 8.7 cm (3.4 in) L/24 guns and eight 3.7 cm (1.5 in) Hotchkiss revolver cannons for defense against torpedo boats.

Sachsen's armor was made of wrought iron, and was concentrated in an armored citadel amidships. The armor ranged from 203 to 254 mm (8 to 10 in) on the armored citadel, and between 50–75 mm (2–3 in) on the deck. The barbette armor was 254 mm of wrought iron backed by 250 mm of teak.

=== Modifications ===
Sachsen was extensively modernized in 1896–1897. The ship's entire propulsion system, including screws, boilers, and engines were replaced with new equipment. The single-expansion engines were replaced with compound engines that offered higher performance. Wood construction was replaced with steel and the vessel was lightened by 300 t (300 long tons; 330 short tons). The four funnels were trunked into a single stack and a new conning tower was built, protected by nickel-steel. The secondary battery was also improved: the 8.7 cm guns were replaced with 8.8 cm SK L/30 quick-firing guns and the eight 3.7 cm machine guns were replaced with four newer models. On 1 May 1897, the ship was re-commissioned for trials, during which the ship reached 14.5 knots (26.9 km/h; 16.7 mph).

== Service history ==
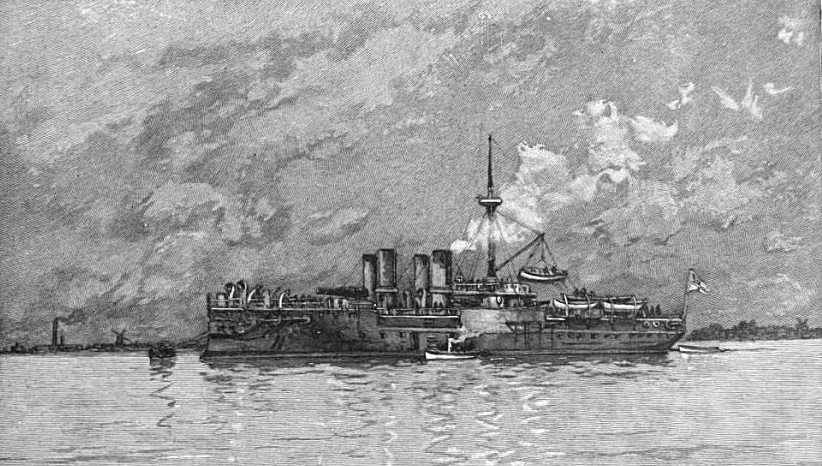
Sachsen early in her career

Sachsen was ordered by the Imperial Navy on 23 June 1874 under the contract name "B," which denoted that the vessel was a new addition to the fleet. (Note: German warships were ordered under provisional names. Additions to the fleet were given a single letter; ships intended to replace older or lost vessels were ordered as "Ersatz (name of the ship to be replaced)".) She was built at the AG Vulcan shipyard in Stettin; she was the second ironclad built by that shipyard after the SMS Preussen. Her keel was laid down in 1875 under yard number 74. The ship was launched on 21 July 1877, and at the launching ceremony, Stosch gave a speech. She was commissioned on 20 October 1878 and thereafter began initial sea trials that lasted into November, though her armament had not yet been installed. These tests revealed the need for structural improvements, and so she was decommissioned for the work to be carried out; her guns were fitted during that period. A second round of tests followed during a second period in commission from March to July 1879; during these tests, the ship was commanded by Kapitän zur See (KzS—Captain at Sea) Wilhelm von Wickede from March to May and then KzS Paul Zirzow from May to July. Work on the other three Sachsen-class ships was stopped to gain further experience with Sachsen so any deficiencies could be corrected while the other vessels were still under construction.

=== 1880–1897 ===
After finally entering regular service in 1880, Sachsen joined the Training Squadron of the German fleet. She was commissioned on 15 April for the year's training exercises, and was decommissioned for the winter on 27 September. At that time, the German fleet was tasked primarily with coastal defense against France and Russia, who were presumed to be the most likely enemies in a continental war. The ship saw little further activity in the early 1880s, as further improvements were made to the ship. She was briefly recommissioned from 15 February to 12 May 1882 for more testing, including the first firing of her main guns. KzS Max von der Goltz served as her commander during this short period in commission. During this period, heightened tensions with Russia prompted the naval command developed more offensively-minded contingencies. These formed the basis for the annual summer fleet maneuvers, in which Sachsen took part. The ship was recommissioned again on 22 April 1884 under the command of Korvettenkapitän (KK—Corvette Captain) Friedrich von Pawelsz, for the second time she was to join the Training Squadron. By that time, all three of her sisters had been completed and were ready to serve as a homogeneous division. Following the completion of the fleet exercises, she was decommissioned again on 30 September.

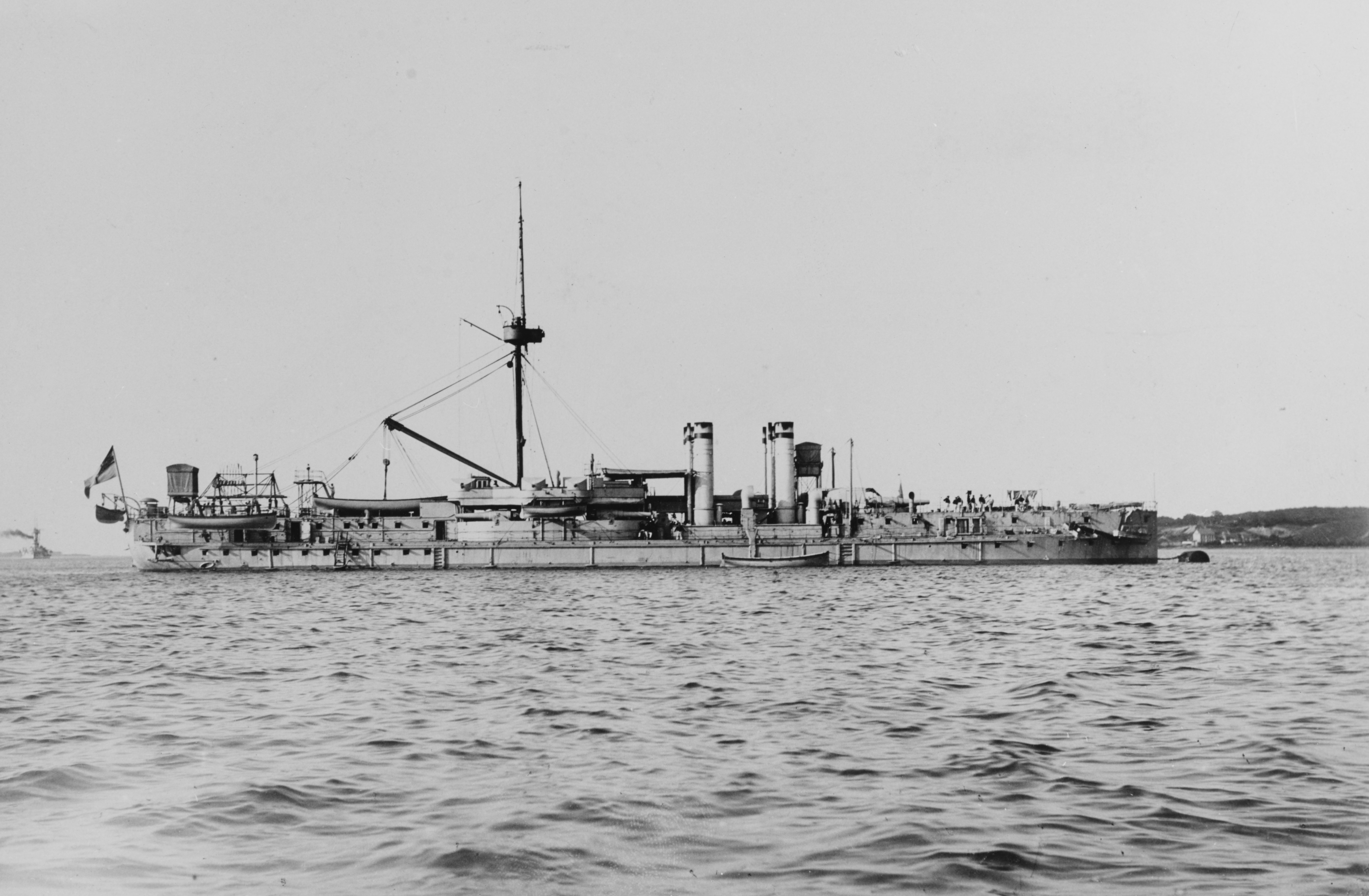
Sachsen moored to a buoy, c. 1895–1897

Sachsen was assigned to the Reserve Division of the Baltic Sea for 1885 and remained out of service into early 1886, but after her sister Bayern suffered engine damage, Sachsen was commissioned on 15 May to replace her for that year's training cycle. Her captain was KzS Karl August Deinhard. She was decommissioned again after the end of the maneuvers in September to return to the Reserve Division, but she remained in commission during this period as a guard ship stationed in Kiel. At that time, KzS Franz von Kyckbusch relieved Deinhard of command. In June 1887, she was present for the ceremonies marking the beginning of construction of the Kaiser Wilhelm Canal, which was to link Kiel with the North Sea. Her tenure as the Kiel guard ship ended in November 1887, and she became an inactive vessel in the Reserve Division. She remained out of service for much of the next year, apart from a brief commission from 4 April to 28 May 1888, again under Kyckbusch's command. On 1 May 1889, Sachsen relieved Bayern as the guard ship in Kiel once again, and she also took part in the fleet exercises that year. KzS Otto von Diederichs became the ship's captain that year. Sachsen took part in a goodwill visit to Portsmouth to take part in the Cowes Regatta. Following the trip to England, Sachsen and the rest of the fleet conducted the annual summer exercises. The ship thereafter decommissioned in September and was returned to the inactive reserve.

In 1891, the German navy stopped the practice of deactivating the fleet in the winter months and instead kept the front-line units on permanent active duty. The fleet was also reorganized, to form two four-ship divisions. Sachsen and her sisters were assigned to I Division in 1892, under the command of Konteradmiral (KAdm—Rear Admiral) Hans von Koester. At that time, KK Carl Wodrig took command of the vessel. Annual fleet training cruises were conducted in April. The summer fleet maneuvers, which occurred during mid-August to mid-September, up through 1894 were always centered on defensive actions in the North and Baltic seas. Sachsen's normal activities in 1892 were interrupted by a temporary stint as the fleet's torpedo training vessel from May to November; the normal ship in that role, the screw corvette Blücher, was undergoing periodic maintenance at that time. While serving with the torpedo school, Sachsen took part in torpedo test firing in September off Arendal, Norway. In October, KK Hugo Zeye replaced Wodrig as the ship's commander, though he served for just two months before being replaced in turn by KzS Prince Heinrich of Prussia. At the same time, Sachsen took the place of the coastal defense ship Beowulf in I Division. She and the rest of the squadron conducted the first winter cruise of the German fleet in the Baltic.

She remained in the squadron through 1893, which passed uneventfully for Sachsen. In February 1894, the vessel briefly became the squadron flagship, as Prince Heinrich took the place of the departing commander, Koester. The squadron conducted a training cruise to Scotland and Norway in May, and in July, she carried Prince Heinrich to Copenhagen, Denmark, for part of the celebrations of the fiftieth wedding anniversary of King Christian IX of Denmark and Louise of Hesse-Kassel. For the autumn maneuvers that year, Sachsen and her three sisters were transferred to II Division. In September, following the maneuvers, KzS Rudolf Rittmeyer relieved Prince Heinrich as the ship's commander.

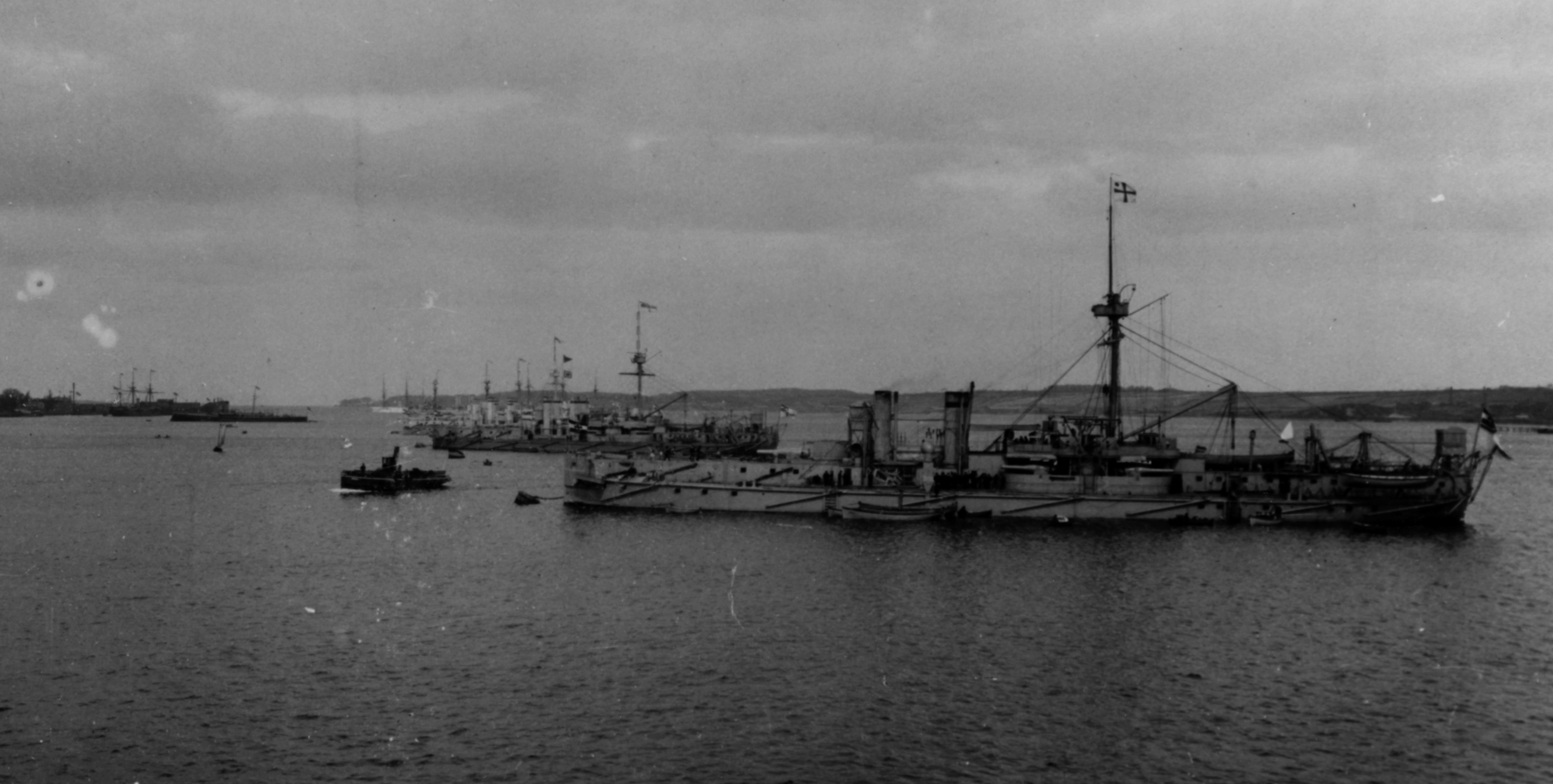
The German fleet at anchor in 1896; the four Sachsen-class ironclads are at right

In March 1895, Sachsen won the Kaiser's Schießpreis (Shooting Prize) for excellent gunnery; this was the first year the prize was awarded. The ship was present for the opening ceremonies of the Kaiser Wilhelm Canal in June. She relieved her sister Baden as the divisional flagship in July 1895, as the latter needed periodic maintenance. The divisional commander, KAdm Carl Barandon, shifted his flag to Sachsen on 23 July. On 1 October, KAdm Volkmar von Arnim replaced Barandon; by that time, Baden had returned to the unit, but Sachsen remained the flagship. Also in October, KK Alfred Breusing relieved Rittmeyer as Sachsen's commander. She won the Schießpreis a second time, for shooting during the fleet maneuvers. In December, the division was reorganized, and only Sachsen and her sister Württemberg remained in the unit. They were joined by the aviso Wacht in March 1896 and then the old ironclad König Wilhelm in May, which had been rebuilt into an armored cruiser. The latter vessel replaced Sachsen as the divisional flagship, but Sachsen saw two periods serving as the squadron flagship, replacing the new pre-dreadnought battleship Kurfürst Friedrich Wilhelm, from 19 September to 30 November, and then from 15 December 1896 to 1 March 1897. During this period, Vizeadmiral (VAdm—Vice Admiral) August von Thomsen became the squadron commander on 4 October.

In March 1897, Sachsen returned to II Division, where she became the flagship of Prince Heinrich once again. That year, she and the rest of I Squadron that escorted Wilhelm II on a visit to St. Petersburg, Russia. She remained in service with the unit for the rest of the year, and in October, Heinrich was replaced by KAdm Felix von Bendemann. At that time, the unit included Württemberg, the ironclad Oldenburg, and the aviso Greif. Sachsen briefly came under the command of KK Hugo Plachte from October to November. For a period, the German government considered the possibility to send Sachsen to Haiti in response to the Lüders affair, but eventually decided against it. At the end of the year, she was decommissioned to free her crew for use in warships being sent to strengthen the East Asia Division; this also permitted the reconstruction of Sachsen along the same lines as her sister Baden.

=== 1898–1919 ===
Starting in 1897, Sachsen was dry-docked at the Kaiserliche Werft (Imperial Shipyard) in Kiel for an extensive modernization that lasted until early 1899. After work was completed, Sachsen was recommissioned on 25 April 1899 and returned to active service, temporarily under the command of KzS Wahrendorff. In September, Fregattenkapitän (FK—Frigate Captain) Wilhelm Kindt became the ship's commander. She became the flagship of what had been renamed I Squadron from 31 January to 26 February 1900, under the command of VAdm Paul Hoffmann. At 15:45 the following day—27 February—Sachsen ran aground outside Kiel in foggy weather. The grounding dented the bottom of the hull and tore it open. However, on 2 March, the ship was able to get underway at high tide. Repairs lasted for two weeks. Later that month, she was involved in a minor collision with the new armored cruiser Fürst Bismarck. In July, the four Brandenburg-class battleships were sent to East Asia in response to the Boxer Uprising in Qing China, which prompted a major reorganization of the German fleet in home waters. Sachsen and her sisters were transferred to I Division, along with the new pre-dreadnought SMS Kaiser Wilhelm II, which served as the squadron flagship. The Reserve Division of the North Sea was established at this time, and Sachsen was formally assigned to it, though she remained operational with I Division that year. Sachsen served as the divisional flagship from 18 December 1900 to 5 January 1901 under KAdm Max von Fischel.

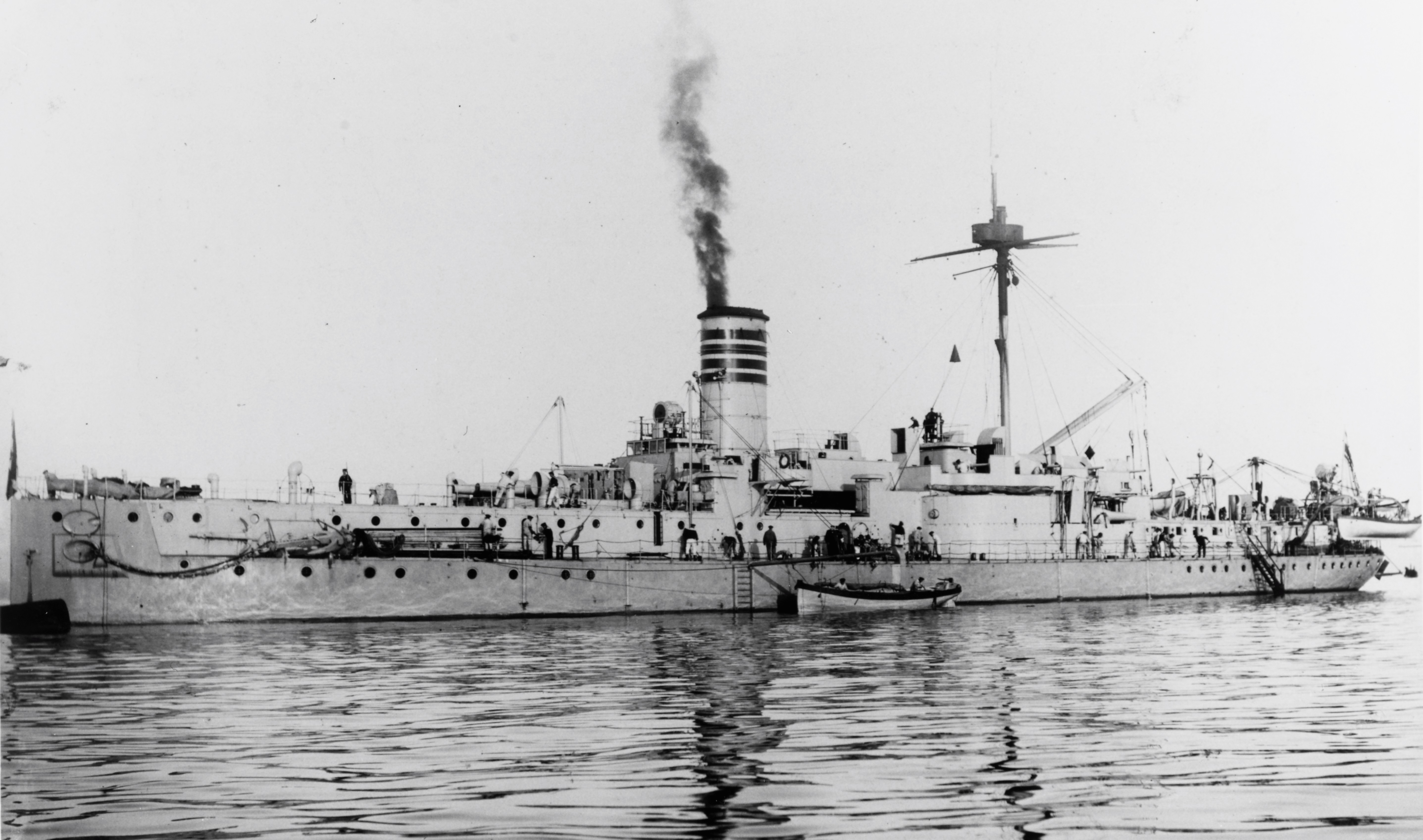
Sachsen after her modernization

In mid-1901, when the Brandenburg-class battleships arrived back in Germany, Sachsen and her sisters were transferred to II Squadron. There, they took part in the annual autumn fleet maneuvers; during the exercises on 4 September, Sachsen collided with Wacht. Wacht was sunk, but the crew was safely evacuated and neither ship suffered casualties. During the maneuvers, Wacht attempted to pass between Sachsen and her sistership Württemberg. However, Wacht's helmsman misjudged the distance and passed too closely in front of Sachsen. Sachsen immediately attempted to reverse course to avoid ramming the cruiser, but the ships collided. Sachsen's ram bow tore a large hole in Wacht, which began to slowly sink. The battleship Weissenburg attempted to tow Wacht to shallow water, but several of Wacht's internal bulkheads collapsed under the strain and the ship quickly sank. In October, the ship briefly came under the command of KzS Max von Basse, but the following month, he was relieved by KzS August von Heeringen, who was to be the vessel's last captain. The navy planned to retire Sachsen at the end of the year, but this was cancelled when the battleship Wörth required maintenance, so she took that vessel's place in I Squadron. This proved to be a temporary delay, and on 3 February 1902, she was decommissioned and placed in reserve; her place in the squadron was taken by the new battleship Kaiser Karl der Grosse.

The ship was initially stationed in Wilhelmshaven and allocated to the first category of reserve. In 1903, she was towed to Kiel, where she remained in the first category of reserve until 1906, when she was transferred to the second category of reserve. She remained as a reserve vessel until 19 February 1910, when she was stricken from the navy list. The following year, Sachsen was used as a target hulk off the coast of Schwansen for the fleet until the German defeat in World War I in late 1918. On 5 May 1919, the German navy sold the vessel to Hattinger Co., which broke the ship up for scrap in Wilhelmshaven.
