= Meteor-class aviso =

Aviso class of the German Imperial Navy

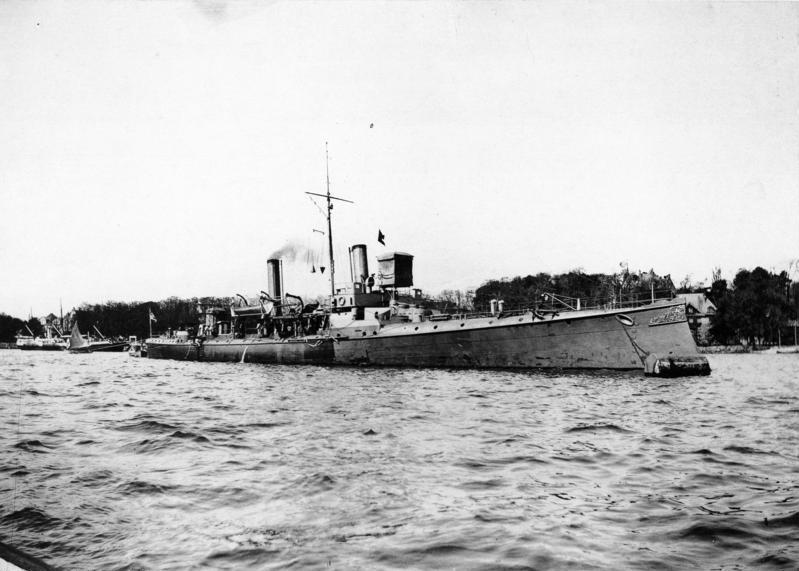
- Meteor at anchor

Class overview
- Operators: Imperial German Navy
- Preceded by: Wacht class
- Succeeded by: SMS Hela
- Completed: 2
- Retired: 2

General characteristics
- Type: Aviso
- Displacement: Design: 961 to 992 t (946 to 976 long tons); Full load: 1,078 to 1,117 t (1,061 to 1,099 long tons)
- Length: 79.86 m (262 ft 0 in) o/a
- Beam: 9.56 m (31 ft 4 in)
- Draft: 3.68 m (12 ft 1 in)
- Installed power: 4 × locomotive boilers; 4,500 to 5,000 PS (4,400 to 4,900 ihp)
- Propulsion: 2 × double-expansion steam engines; 2 × screw propellers
- Speed: 19 to 19.5 kn (35.2 to 36.1 km/h; 21.9 to 22.4 mph)
- Range: 960 nmi (1,780 km; 1,100 mi) at 9 kn (17 km/h; 10 mph)
- Complement: 7 officers; 108 enlisted men
- Armament: 4 × 8.8 cm (3.5 in) SK L/30 guns; 3 × 35 cm (13.8 in) torpedo tubes
- Armor: Deck: 15 mm (0.59 in); Conning tower: 30 mm (1.2 in)

The Meteor class was a pair of two avisos built for the German Kaiserliche Marine (Imperial Navy) in the late-1880s and early 1890s. The class comprised two ships: Meteor and Comet. Unlike earlier avisos built for the fleet, which were designed to fill a variety of roles, the Meteor class was intended to protect the fleet's capital ships from torpedo boat attacks. They were armed with a battery of four 8.8 cm (3.5 in) quick-firing guns. Both vessels suffered from serious problems that rendered them unfit for service, namely poor seakeeping and excessive vibration of their propeller shafts. As a result, they saw little service, with Comet's only periods in commission being to test what were unsuccessful attempts to correct the problems. Meteor had a somewhat more active career, serving with the fleet in 1893–1894 and then as a fishery protection ship in 1895–1896, but she, too, spent most of her existence laid up. Both vessels were decommissioned in 1896 and struck from the naval register in 1911. Meteor was then used as a barracks ship, while Comet became a storage hulk; the two ships were broken up in 1919 and 1921, respectively.

== Design ==
The Imperial Navy began building small avisos in the 1880s to serve in the main fleet in German waters. These vessels were intended to support the battle line, as scouts for the fleet, as flotilla leaders for the fleet's torpedo boats, and as a screen against enemy torpedo boats. Unlike the contemporary German unprotected cruisers, their designs emphasized offensive capability and high speed rather than a long cruising radius. In 1888, the German naval command decided that future avisos should be focused solely on defense against hostile torpedo boats. Compared to the earlier Wacht-class avisos, the Meteor design was slightly smaller and displaced around 25 percent less than the earlier vessels. The primary alterations included a more powerful propulsion system, a new gun armament of quick-firing guns, and slightly thicker armor plating.

Meteor and Comet proved to be failures in service. They suffered from severe vibration and their small size rendered them poor sea boats; these defects significantly curtailed their careers, and they spent most of their existence in reserve. The Meteor class was the second to last aviso design produced by the Imperial Navy, followed only by Hela; by the 1890s, German naval designers had taken the best characteristics of the avisos and the contemporary unprotected cruisers and combined them in the Gazelle class of light cruisers, the first vessels of that type of warship.

=== General characteristics and machinery ===
Meteor during her short active career

Meteor and Comet were 79.86 meters (262 ft 0 in) long at the waterline and 79.86 m (262 ft 0 in) long overall. They had a beam of 9.56 m (31 ft 4 in) and a maximum draft of 3.68 m (12 ft 1 in) forward. Meteor displaced 961 metric tons (946 long tons) as designed and up to 1,078 t (1,061 long tons) at full combat load, while Comet was slightly heavier, at 992 t (976 long tons) and 1,117 t (1,099 long tons), respectively. Their hulls were constructed from transverse steel frames. Meteor was initially fitted with a single pole mainmast, while Comet had the pole mainmast along with a smaller mast further aft for wireless telegraphy. In 1901–1902, Meteor was fitted with the second mast as well.

The Meteor-class ships had a crew of 7 officers and 108 enlisted men. The ships carried several smaller boats, including one yawl, one dinghy, and one cutter. They were poor sea boats; they were very unstable in anything but calm weather. They also vibrated excessively due to severe cavitation, particularly at high speeds. Both ships were, however, very maneuverable vessels. Their metacentric height was .41 m (1 ft 4 in).

Their propulsion system consisted of two vertical 3-cylinder triple expansion engines that drove a pair of 2.8 m (9 ft 2 in) wide, three-bladed screw propellers. Steam for the engines was provided by four coal-fired locomotive boilers that were trunked into two funnels on the centerline. The ships were equipped with a pair of electric generators with a combined output of 20 to 24 kilowatts (27 to 32 hp) at 67 volts. Steering was controlled by a single rudder.

The ships' propulsion system varied slightly in performance. Meteor's engines were rated at 4,500 metric horsepower (4,400 ihp) for a top speed of 19 knots (35 km/h; 22 mph), though she exceeded both figures on sea trials, reaching a speed of 20 knots (37 km/h; 23 mph). Comet's engines were rated for 5,000 metric horsepower (4,900 ihp) and 19.5 kn (36.1 km/h; 22.4 mph), which she did not exceed on her trials. Both ships had a range of approximately 960 nautical miles (1,780 km; 1,100 mi) at 9 kn (17 km/h; 10 mph).

=== Armament and armor ===
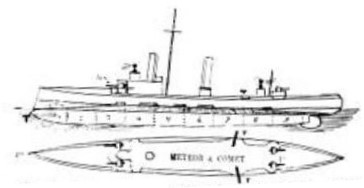
Plan and profile drawing of the Meteor class

The ships were armed with four 8.8 cm (3.5 in) SK L/30 guns placed in single pivot mounts, two side-by-side forward, and two side-by-side aft. The guns were supplied with between 462 and 680 rounds of ammunition, and they had a range of 6,900 m (7,500 yd). They also carried three 35 cm (13.8 in) torpedo tubes, one mounted submerged in the bow and the other two in deck-mounted launchers on the broadside. They were supplied with eight torpedoes. Both ships were protected with steel armor. They had a 15 mm (0.59 in) thick deck with 25 mm (0.98 in) thick sloped sides. The conning tower had 30 mm (1.2 in) thick plating on the sides, with a 15 mm thick roof.

== Ships ==
Construction data
Ship	Builder	Laid down	Launched	Completed
Meteor	Germaniawerft, Kiel	December 1888	20 January 1890	15 May 1891
Comet	AG Vulcan, Stettin	November 1891	15 November 1892	29 April 1893

== Service history ==
Comet in port, date unknown

After Meteor entered service, the problems with her design became apparent; attempts to remedy the defects and sea trials to determine the efforts' effectiveness occupied much of the ship's first two years in service. This period also saw the ship take part in training exercises with the rest of the German fleet. By 1893, Comet had also entered service, and she also underwent ultimately ineffective modifications following her initial trials. Meteor was employed as a fisheries protection vessel in 1895–1896, though she proved unsuited to the task, owing to her small size, which limited the amount of coal she could store and thus the amount of time she could remain on patrol in Germany's coastal waters. As a result, she was withdrawn from that service in late 1896.

Comet never saw an extended period of active service; her only periods in commission were to conduct trials after alterations were made to the ship. She, too, was laid up in 1896; both ships were reclassified as light cruisers in 1899 and then reduced to harbor guard ships in 1904. Both were struck from the naval register in 1911, with Meteor becoming a barracks ship in Kiel and Comet being converted into a storage hulk for naval mines. Meteor and Comet were sold for scrapping in 1919 and 1921, respectively.
