= SMS Greif (1886) =

Aviso of the German Imperial Navy

- SMS Greif

Class overview
- Operators: Imperial German Navy
- Preceded by: Blitz class
- Succeeded by: Wacht class
- Completed: 1

History

German Empire
- Name: SMS Greif
- Builder: Germaniawerft, Kiel
- Laid down: 1885
- Launched: 29 July 1886
- Commissioned: 9 July 1887
- Decommissioned: 22 September 1900
- Stricken: 25 October 1912
- Fate: Scrapped, 1921

General characteristics
- Type: Aviso
- Displacement: Design: 2,050 t (2,020 long tons); Full load: 2,266 t (2,230 long tons)
- Length: 102.6 m (336 ft 7 in) o/a; 99.5 m (326 ft 5 in) w/l
- Beam: 9.75 m (32.0 ft)
- Draft: 4.22 m (13 ft 10 in)
- Installed power: 6 × water-tube boilers; 5,400 metric horsepower (5,300 ihp)
- Propulsion: 2 × double-expansion steam engines; 2 × screw propellers
- Speed: 18 knots (33 km/h; 21 mph)
- Range: 2,180 nmi (4,040 km; 2,510 mi) at 12 kn (22 km/h; 14 mph)
- Complement: 7 officers; 163 enlisted men
- Armament: 2 × 10.5 cm (4.1 in) L/35 guns; 10 × 3.7 cm (1.5 in) Hotchkiss revolver cannon

SMS Greif was an aviso built for the German Kaiserliche Marine (Imperial Navy) in the mid-1880s, the only ship of her class. Designed at a time where torpedoes had become effective weapons and spurred the development of the Jeune École, Greif was intended to guard the capital ships of the fleet against torpedo boat attacks. For this role, she carried a battery of 10.5 cm (4.1 in) and 3.7 cm (1.5 in) guns, unlike other German avisos of the period, which also carried torpedo tubes. Greif was not a successful warship, however, and she spent much of her career laid up, out of service.

Completed in 1887, Greif was not commissioned until 1889, though she remained in service with the fleet only until October 1890, when she was assigned with torpedo testing, a role she filled until 1894 when she was decommissioned. Recommissioned in May 1897, she served as a fleet scout for the next two years, thereafter being reduced to secondary roles once again, including as a training ship, before being decommissioned for the last time in September 1900. Greif was struck from the naval register in 1912, hulked in 1915 during World War I, and used as a mine storage hulk in 1917. After the war, she was sold to ship breakers in 1921 and dismantled in Hamburg.

== Design ==
By the 1880s, the development of torpedoes and torpedo boats had produced a weapons system that could effectively challenge powerful ironclad warships. This led to the development in France of the Jeune École doctrine that emphasized the use of cheap torpedo boats and cruisers instead of expensive ironclads. As other navies, including Germany's, began to adopt the strategy, German planners saw the need for small warships capable of defending the fleet against attacking torpedo boats. The naval command called for a top speed of 19 knots (35 km/h; 22 mph), which would allow the vessel to also operate as a scout for the fleet. To keep weight limited, the armament was to consist of a pair of 10.5 cm (4.1 in) guns. The ship proved to be a disappointment in service and she spent little time as a front-line combat unit.

=== General characteristics ===
Greif was 99.5 meters (326 ft) long at the waterline and 102.6 m (337 ft) long overall. She had a beam of 9.75 m (32 ft) and a draft of 4.22 m (13.8 ft) forward and 4.34 m (14.2 ft) aft. The ship was designed to displace 2,050 metric tons (2,020 long tons; 2,260 short tons), and at full loading, she displaced 2,266 t (2,230 long tons; 2,498 short tons). Her hull was constructed with transverse steel frames and it contained twelve watertight compartments. Unlike the other avisos and cruiser-type vessels built for the German fleet at the time, Greif carried no armor protection.

Greif was a mediocre sea boat and was moderately handy. She pitched slightly but rolled significantly more. Her transverse metacentric height was 0.48 m (1 ft 7 in). The ship had a crew of seven officers and 163 enlisted men, though the latter later increased to 178. Greif carried several smaller boats, including one picket boat, two cutters, one yawl, and one dinghy.

=== Machinery ===
Greif's propulsion system consisted of two horizontal 2-cylinder double expansion engines built by AG Germania, which drove a pair of four-bladed screw propellers that were 4 m (13 ft) wide in diameter. Steam for the engines was provided by six cylindrical, double-ended, coal-fired fire-tube boilers split in three boiler rooms. Each boiler room was ducted into its own funnel. In 1906, she was reequipped with eight new cylindrical boilers in two boiler rooms, which slightly improved her performance. She was equipped with a pair of generators for electrical power; they had a combined output of 20 kilowatts (27 hp) at 67 volts. Steering was controlled with a single rudder.

The ship's propulsion system was rated at 5,400 metric horsepower (5,300 ihp) for a top speed of 18 knots (33 km/h; 21 mph). On trials, Greif reached 5,431 metric horsepower (5,357 ihp) and 18.2 knots (33.7 km/h; 20.9 mph). With the new boilers, her engines could reach 5,795 metric horsepower (5,716 ihp) and 19.1 knots (35.4 km/h; 22.0 mph) on speed trials. She could carry up to 350 t (340 long tons; 390 short tons) of coal, which provided a range of approximately 2,180 nautical miles (4,040 km; 2,510 mi) at a cruising speed of 12 knots (22 km/h; 14 mph). After her refit, she could carry 436 t (429 long tons; 481 short tons) of coal, which increased her range to 3,960 nmi (7,330 km; 4,560 mi) at 10 knots (19 km/h; 12 mph).

=== Armament ===
Unlike the other avisos built by the German navy, which carried torpedo tubes as their primary armament, Greif was armed only with guns. As built, the ship was armed with a main battery of two 10.5 cm (4.1 in) K L/35 guns placed in individual pivot mounts. She carried a secondary battery of ten 3.7 cm (1.5 in) Hotchkiss revolver cannon, also in individual pivot mounts. In 1906, the ship was rearmed with eight 8.8 cm (3.5 in) SK L/35 guns in single mounts and six revolver cannon. Later in her career, two of the 8.8 cm guns and two revolver cannon were removed.

== Service history ==
Greif early in her career

The keel for Greif was laid down in October 1885 at the Germaniawerft shipyard in Kiel, under the provisional designation "Ersatz Loreley". (Note: German warships were ordered under provisional names. Additions to the fleet were given a single letter; ships intended to replace older or lost vessels were ordered as "Ersatz (name of the ship to be replaced)".) She was launched on 29 July 1886 and her christening was performed by Vizeadmiral (VAdm—Vice Admiral) Wilhelm von Wickede, the commander of the Marinestation der Ostsee (Baltic Sea Naval Station). After completing fitting-out, she was commissioned for sea trials on 9 July 1887. Initial testing continued until 15 September and she was decommissioned in Kiel on 17 October. She remained out of service until 19 March 1889, when she was recommissioned in Wilhelmshaven for fishery protection patrols in the North Sea. She operated primarily off the East Frisian Islands during this period, though her duties to protect German territorial waters were interrupted from mid-March to mid-April to escort the screw corvette Alexandrine, which had Kaiser Wilhelm II aboard. Alexandrine was on her way to an overseas deployment, and Wilhelm II also wanted to greet the training squadron corvettes, which were returning from their cruise in the Mediterranean Sea. Greif again accompanied the Kaiser, this time aboard his yacht Hohenzollern on a cruise from 24 June to 10 August that saw the ships steam as far north as Nordkapp, Norway and then to Cowes, Britain. After returning to Germany, Greif served as a scout during fleet training exercises until 30 August. She was then decommissioned in Kiel on 30 September.

On 10 October 1890, the navy established the Torpedo Trials Command to further develop the torpedo arm of the fleet; this work had previously been carried out by the Torpedo Workshop in Friedrichsort. Greif was attached to the command on 1 November to assist with testing operations in Kiel Bay. This work was interrupted on 2 April 1891 when Greif embarked Wilhelm II to greet the screw corvette Carola, then returning from German East Africa, where the Abushiri revolt had recently been suppressed. On 10 June, Greif went into the dry dock at the Kaiserliche Werft in Kiel for modernization, which included the replacement of her main battery. Work was completed on 21 August, followed by sea trials in Danzig Bay through November. The year 1892 passed uneventfully, with the only event of note being Greif's participation in the fleet training maneuvers from 30 August to 5 September.

Greif underwent a thorough overhaul from 17 April 1893 to 2 October, thereafter returning to service with the Torpedo Trials Command. This duty ended on 31 October 1894 when she was decommissioned. She remained out of service until 5 May 1897, when she was recommissioned for service with the fleet as a scout and wireless support ship. She was assigned to II Division, I Squadron to support its flagship König Wilhelm. As part of the unit, she took part in training exercises in the North Sea and later the Baltic, followed by a cruise in company with Wilhelm II and Kaiserin Augusta Victoria to Kronstadt, Russia in August. Upon the squadron's return to German waters later that month, the ships took part in the annual fleet maneuvers. Following their conclusion, Greif embarked Prince Heinrich of Prussia on 22 September; the torpedo boat S26 had sunk in a severe storm in the mouth of the Elbe that day. Aboard had been Duke Friedrich Wilhelm zu Mecklenburg and Heinrich had wanted to take part in the search and salvage effort.

Lithograph of Greif (center), Meteor (left), and Jagd (right) by Willy Stöwer

In December, Greif was assigned to I Division and she joined the battleships on a winter cruise to Christiana, Norway. While the divisional flagship, Kurfürst Friedrich Wilhelm, was in dock for repairs, Greif served in her place from 29 December to 20 February 1898 with VAdm August von Thomsen aboard. Two days later, Grief herself went into dock for periodic maintenance, particularly to her boilers, which were badly worn out. Repairs were completed by 13 May, at which point she returned to I Squadron, joining the ships in Kirkwall, Scotland on 19 May. At the end of the month, she was reassigned to II Division, thereafter participating in the summer and autumn maneuvers that took place in the North and Baltic Seas. During the latter exercises, Greif collided with the torpedo boat S71 on 23 August, though neither vessel was seriously damaged. She operated as part of I Scouting Group, which also included the aviso Hela and the special ship Pelikan. In the first half of December, Greif and the rest of II Division visited Swedish ports; she also served as the division flagship during this period, until 17 December.

Greif was withdrawn from front-line service on 1 April 1899, thereafter taking part in experiments with wireless equipment. She was then assigned to the Naval Artillery Inspectorate as a training ship and was based in the Kieler Förde. She rejoined the fleet to take part in the annual maneuvers from early August to 13 September. The ship then went into dry dock for another overhaul before returning to training duties. On 8 July 1900, she joined Hohenzollern for a cruise to Molde, Norway, and Esbjerg, Denmark, arriving back in Bremerhaven, Germany on 27 July. She again served as a fleet scout during the maneuvers in August and September that concluded in Swinemünde on 15 September. She was decommissioned for the last time on 22 September and in 1901, underwent another thorough overhaul that included the installation of new boilers. She was transferred to the list of special ships on 21 June 1911, and on 25 October 1912, was struck from the naval register. During World War I, she was hulked on 25 October 1915 and used as a training ship for engine room crews; beginning in 1917, she was employed as a mine storage hulk, based in Kiel-Heikendorf. She was sold to ship breakers in Hamburg in 1921.
