= Wacht-class aviso =

Aviso class of the German Imperial Navy

- SMS Wacht in 1888, early in her career

Class overview
- Operators: Imperial German Navy
- Preceded by: SMS Greif
- Succeeded by: Meteor class
- Completed: 2
- Lost: 1
- Retired: 1

General characteristics
- Type: Aviso
- Displacement: Design: 1,246 t (1,226 long tons); Full load: 1,499 t (1,475 long tons)
- Length: 85.8 m (281 ft 6 in) o/a
- Beam: 9.66 m (31 ft 8 in)
- Draft: 3.74 m (12 ft 3 in)
- Installed power: 4 × locomotive boilers; 4,000 PS (3,900 ihp)
- Propulsion: 2 × double-expansion steam engines; 2 × screw propellers
- Speed: 19 knots (35 km/h; 22 mph)
- Range: 2,440 nmi (4,520 km; 2,810 mi) at 9 knots (17 km/h; 10 mph)
- Complement: 7 officers; 134 enlisted men
- Armament: 3 × 10.5 cm (4.1 in) K L/35 guns; 3 × 35 cm (13.8 in) torpedo tubes
- Armor: Deck: 10 mm (0.39 in); Conning tower: 25 mm (0.98 in)

The Wacht class was a pair of avisos built by the German Kaiserliche Marine (Imperial Navy) in the late-1880s; the class comprised two ships, Wacht and Jagd. They were laid down in 1886 and 1887 and completed by 1888 and 1889, respectively. The ships were based on the previous aviso, SMS Greif, which had proved to be an unsuccessful design due to its lack of torpedo armament. As a result, the Wacht-class ships were equipped with three torpedo tubes to improve their combat power; they were also the first German avisos to carry armor protection.

Both ships served in the main German fleet for the entirety of their active duty careers. They were primarily employed in the peacetime routine of unit and fleet training maneuvers. In September 1901, Wacht was accidentally rammed by the ironclad SMS Sachsen during the annual fleet maneuvers. The collision caused serious damage to Wacht and she quickly sank. Jagd continued in service for another three years, after which she was withdrawn from service and used in various roles over the following sixteen years. She was sold for scrapping in 1920.

== Design ==
The German Kaiserliche Marine (Imperial Navy) had begun building modern, steel-hulled avisos in the 1880s to serve as fleet scouts and to lead flotillas of torpedo boats; the first of these were the two Blitz-class ships. After General Leo von Caprivi replaced Albrecht von Stosch as the chief of the Kaiserliche Admiralität (Imperial Admiralty) in 1883, the navy began to take a turn toward the Jeune École doctrine, embracing the concept of using small, cheap torpedo boats to defend the country's coast instead of expensive ironclad warships. This strategy found favor in the Reichstag (Imperial Diet), which at that time opposed naval spending. Caprivi directed that the next aviso to be built—what became the Wacht class—should be smaller and faster, able to keep pace with the latest torpedo boats.

The resulting ships proved to be disappointments in service: their smaller size rendered them poor sea boats, which was revealed only after they had been completed and conducted sea trials. Additionally, their gun battery was too weak to allow them to effectively engage comparable vessels in other fleets. Both of these defects limited their utility as fleet scouts. The class did introduce some improvements over previous designs, however, including an armor deck and protection for the conning tower, along with electric lighting for the ships.

=== General characteristics ===
The Wacht-class ships were 84 meters (276 ft) long at the waterline and 85.5 m (281 ft) long overall. They had a beam of 9.66 m (31.7 ft) and a maximum draft of 3.74 m (12.3 ft) forward and 4.67 m (15.3 ft) aft. They displaced 1,246 metric tons (1,226 long tons; 1,373 short tons) as designed and up to 1,499 t (1,475 long tons; 1,652 short tons) at full combat load. Their hulls were constructed from transverse steel frames. Wacht and Jagd each had a crew of 7 officers and 134 enlisted men. The ships carried several smaller boats, including one picket boat, one yawl, one dinghy, and one cutter. They were poor sea boats; they rolled and pitched badly and were very wet. They were also not particularly maneuverable vessels.

=== Machinery ===
Their propulsion system consisted of two angled 3-cylinder triple expansion engines that each drove a 3.3 m (11 ft) wide three-bladed screw. Steam for the engines was provided by four coal-fired locomotive boilers trunked into a single funnel amidships. In 1891–1893, new boilers manufactured by Schichau-Werke and the Kaiserliche Werft (Imperial Shipyard) in Wilhelmshaven were installed. The ships were equipped with a pair of electric generators with a combined output of 20 kilowatts (27 hp) at 67 volts.

The ships' propulsion system provided a top speed of 19 knots (35 km/h; 22 mph) and was rated at 4,000 metric horsepower (3,900 ihp), though neither ship reached that horsepower in service. They carried up to 230 t (230 long tons; 250 short tons) of coal, which enabled them to steam for approximately 2,860 nautical miles (5,300 km; 3,290 mi) at 10 knots (19 km/h; 12 mph). Steering was controlled by a single rudder.

=== Armament and armor ===
Plan and profile of the Wacht class

As built, the ships were armed with three 10.5 cm (4.1 in) K L/35 guns placed in single pivot mounts. The guns were supplied with a total of 180 rounds of ammunition and had a range of 7,000 m (23,000 ft). Wacht and Jagd also carried three 35 cm (13.8 in) torpedo tubes, one mounted submerged in the bow and the other two in deck-mounted launchers on the broadside. In 1891, four 8.8 cm SK L/30 quick-firing guns in single mounts replaced the 10.5 cm guns.

The ships were the first German aviso to carry armor: a 10 mm (0.39 in) thick deck with 20 mm (0.79 in) thick sloped sides protected the magazines and engine rooms. The conning tower was protected with 25 mm (0.98 in) of armor plating on the sides and 10 mm on the roof. The coaming around the funnel was 75 mm (3.0 in) thick. The armor consisted of compound wrought iron. For protection against underwater attack, the hull was divided into twelve watertight compartments below the armored deck and ten compartments above it.

== Ships ==
Construction data
Ship	Builder	Laid down	Launched	Completed
Wacht	AG Weser, Bremen	August 1886	27 August 1887	9 August 1888
Jagd	AG Weser, Bremen	1887	7 July 1888	25 June 1889

== Service history ==
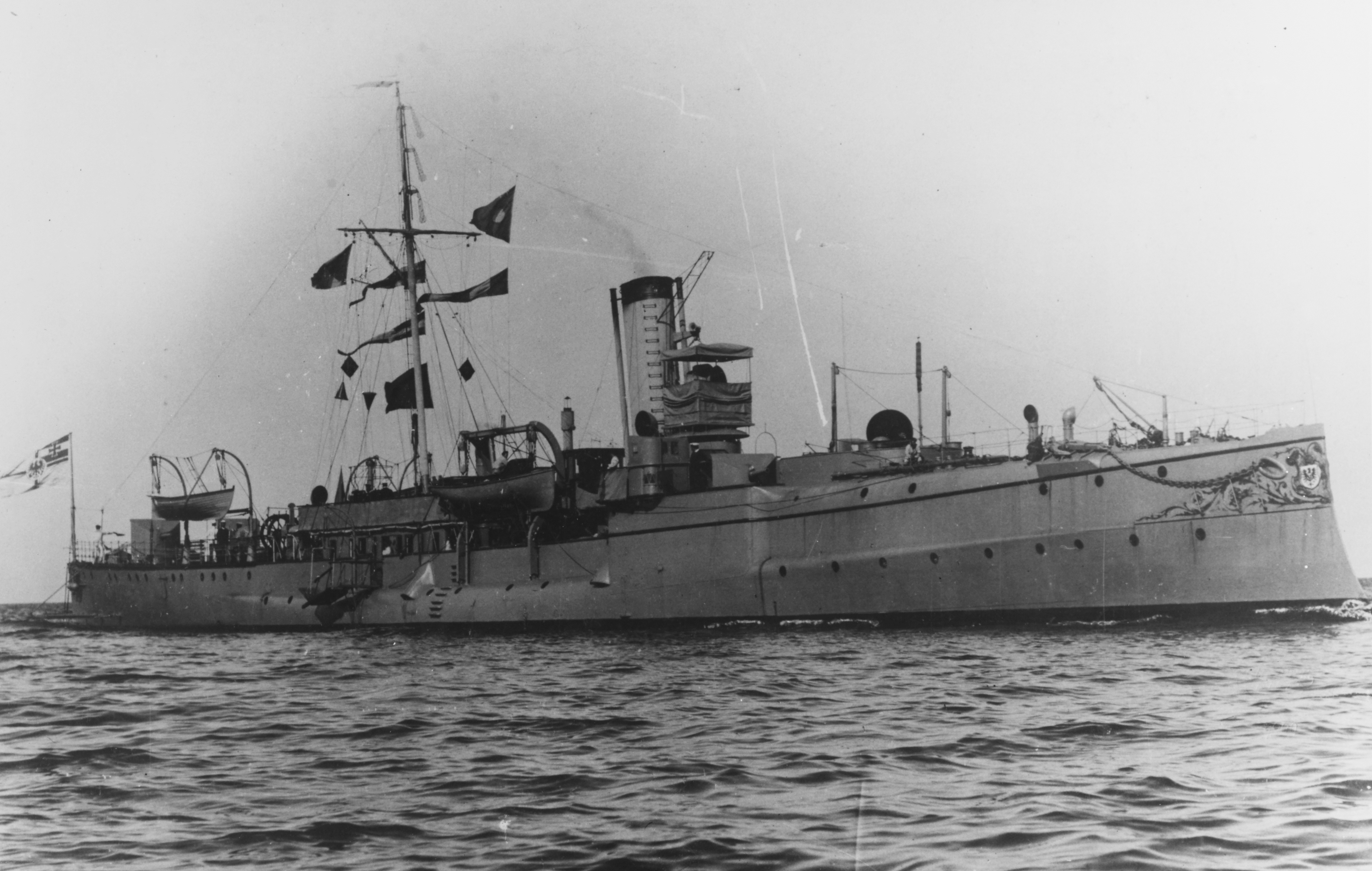
Wacht in 1899

Wacht and Jagd served in a variety of roles during their careers. Wacht initially served with the main fleet, and in 1889 she embarked on a major training cruise to the Mediterranean Sea in company with four ironclad warships and the imperial yacht, Hohenzollern, for a series of visits by Kaiser Wilhelm II to Greece, the Ottoman Empire, the Austro-Hungarian Empire, and Italy. By the time the ships returned to Germany, Jagd had entered service as a guard ship in Wilhelmshaven, though she escorted Wilhelm II aboard Hohenzollern for another pair of cruises in the North Sea in 1890 and 1891. Both ships also took part in the peacetime routine of training exercises that culminated in major fleet maneuvers every August and September. By 1893, Wacht had begun to serve as a flotilla leader for torpedo boats. Jagd was the first vessel to pass through the Kaiser Wilhelm Canal in March 1895 before the waterway officially opened in June; her passage was a test of the lock system to ensure that it worked properly.

In the mid-1890s, the ships began to operate as avisos with the capital ships of the main fleet; in this role, they served as scouts, relayed signals, and screened them from torpedo boat attacks. In early 1901, Jagd went to Britain as part of the fleet that represented Germany at the funeral of Queen Victoria, but by 11 August, a survey of the ship had determined that she was in poor condition, and so she was removed from service. On 4 September, Wacht accidentally collided with the ironclad Sachsen during training exercises. Sachsen's ram bow badly damaged Wacht below the waterline, causing her to rapidly sink, though her entire crew was safely evacuated. Jagd saw little use; she was struck from the naval register in May 1910 and then used as a torpedo launching platform for torpedo training. She was ultimately sold to ship breakers in 1920.
