= 8.8 cm SK L/30 naval gun =

8.8 cm SK L/30
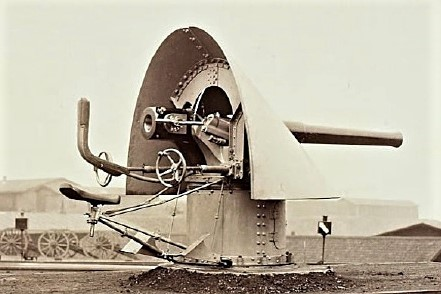
- Type: Naval gun
- Place of origin: German Empire

Service history
- In service: 1892–1945
- Used by: German Empire; Nazi Germany; Ottoman Empire
- Wars: World War I World War II

Production history
- Designed: 1890–1892

Specifications
- Mass: 644 kilograms (1,420 lb)
- Length: about 2.64 meters (8 ft 8 in)
- Shell: fixed
- Shell weight: 7 kilograms (15 lb)
- Caliber: 88 millimeters (3.5 in)
- Breech: horizontal sliding-wedge
- Elevation: Depends on mount: MPL C/89: -10° to +20° Ubts.L: -10° to +30°
- Rate of fire: 15 RPM
- Muzzle velocity: 590 m/s (1,900 ft/s)
- Maximum firing range: Depends on mount: MPL C/89: 7,300 metres (8,000 yd) at +20° Ubts.L: 10,500 metres (11,500 yd) at +30°

The 8.8 cm SK L/30 (SK - Schnelladekanone (quick loading cannon) L - Länge (with a 30-caliber barrel) was a German naval gun that was used in World War I on a variety of mounts.

== Description ==
The 8.8 cm SK L/30 gun weighed 644 kilograms (1,420 lb) and had an overall length of about 2.64 meters (8 ft 8 in). It used the Krupp horizontal sliding block, or "wedge", as it is sometimes referred to, breech design. In addition to mounts for surface ships there was also a submarine version which was on either a retractable or fixed pivot mount. The Krupp mount retracted vertically through a hatch, while the Erhardt version folded down onto the ship's deck.

== Naval service ==
The 8.8 cm SK L/30 was a widely used naval gun on World War I pre-dreadnoughts, cruisers, coastal defence ships, avisos, submarines and torpedo boats in both casemates and turrets. Its primary use on pre-dreadnoughts, cruisers and coastal defence ships was as an anti-torpedo boat gun, while on avisos, submarines and torpedo boats it was their secondary armament.

Ship classes that carried the 8.8 cm SK L/30 include:

- A-class torpedo boat
- Blitz-class aviso
- Brandenburg-class battleship
- Iltis-class gunboat
- Kaiser Friedrich III-class battleship
- Meteor-class aviso
- Odin-class coastal defense ship
- Preussen-class ironclad
- Siegfried-class coastal defense ship
- Type U 139 submarine
- Type U 151 submarine
- Type U 66 submarine
- Type U 93 submarine
- Type UB II submarine
- Type UB III submarine
- Type UC II submarine
- Type UC III submarine
- Type UE I submarine
- Victoria Louise-class cruiser
- Wacht-class aviso
- Wittelsbach-class battleship

== See also ==
- List of naval guns
- 8.8 cm SK C/30 naval gun: later development of similar calibre weapon, made in 1930
