= Willy Stöwer =

German painter (1864–1931)

Professor Willy Stöwer
- Stöwer in 1913
- Born: Wilhelm Christian Friedrich Stöwer; 22 May 1864; Wolgast, Province of Pomerania, Kingdom of Prussia
- Died: 31 May 1931 (aged 67); Berlin-Tegel, Province of Brandenburg, Free State of Prussia, Germany
- Education: self-taught
- Known for: Naval art, Imperial German period Commercial art
- Notable work: Der Untergang der „Titanic‟
- Spouse: Henrietta Dettmann (m. 1898)
- Patrons: Kaiser Wilhelm II

Willy Stöwer (22 May 1864 – 31 May 1931) was a German artist, illustrator, and author during the Imperial Period. He is best known for nautical paintings and lithographs. Many of his works depict historical maritime events such as the sinking of the RMS Titanic in 1912.

== Life ==
Willy Stöwer, the son of a sea captain, was born in Wolgast, Germany on the Baltic coast. He originally trained as a metalworker and worked as a technician in the engineering offices of various German shipyards. He soon received commissions as a draftsman, illustrator and painter. His talent was recognized early and his painting technique was self-taught. In 1892 he married Henrietta Dettmann from a wealthy family, allowing him to devote himself exclusively to his work as an artist.

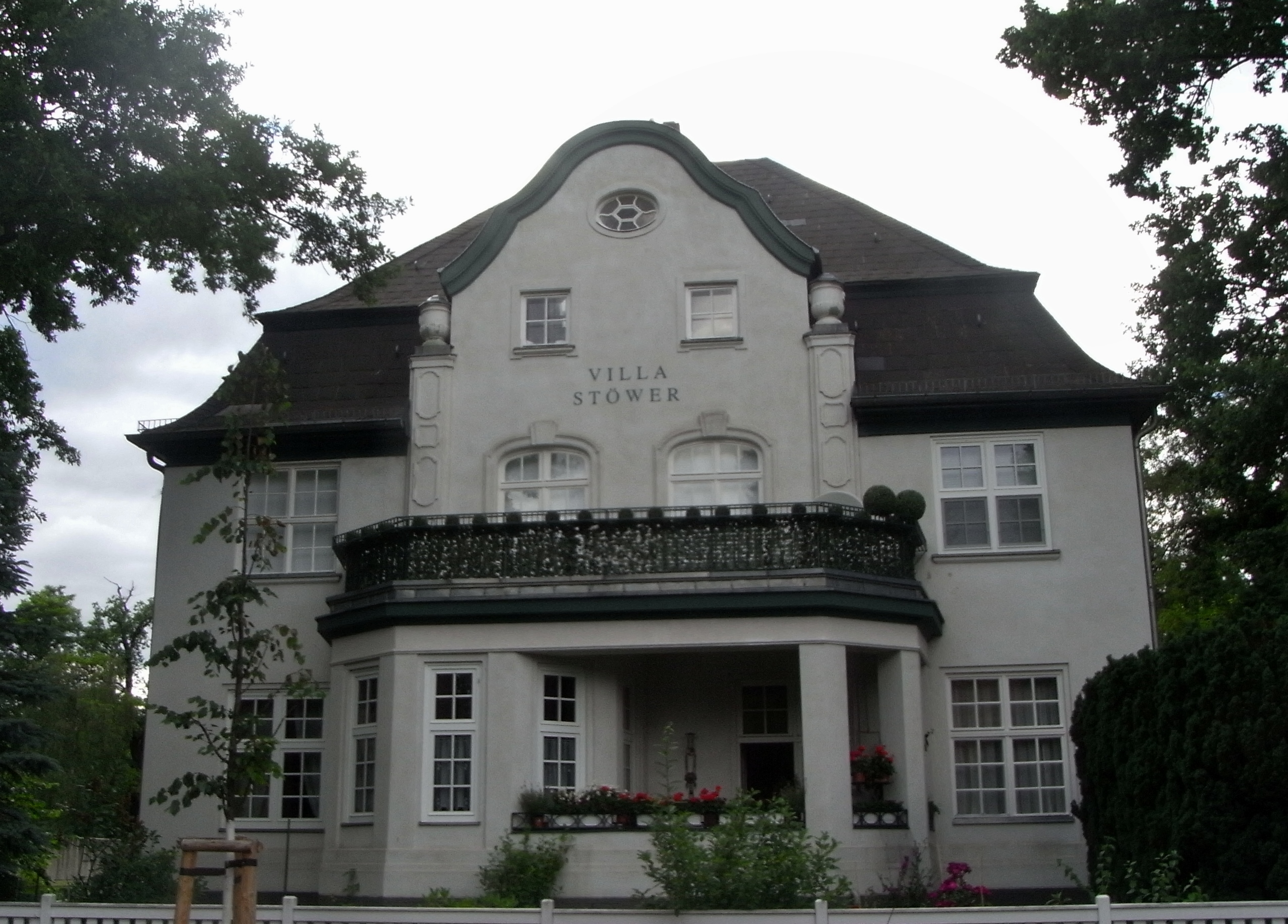
Villa Stöwer (Note: The Stöwer Villa at 68 Gabrielenstraße is listed as a Berlin cultural monument) in Tegel, 2013

Kaiser Wilhelm II became an enthusiastic supporter and patron of the artist and Stöwer was said to be the Kaiser's favorite naval painter. Stöwer even accompanied the Emperor on several voyages between 1905 and 1912. He was a board member of the German Navy League (German: Deutscher Flottenverein) and was awarded an honorary professorship in 1907. The course of his life followed that of his patron and the fate of the Imperial German Navy. As with contemporaries such as Hans Bohrdt, his most significant creative period concluded with the abdication of the Kaiser and the end of the Imperial era. His later career, being without Imperial favor, relied on a few commissions from steamship lines. He died in relative obscurity at his Berlin-Tegel villa on 31 May 1931, nine days after his 67th birthday. Stöwer is interred in Cemetery III of the Jerusalem and New Churches in Berlin, where the grave remains preserved.

== Career ==
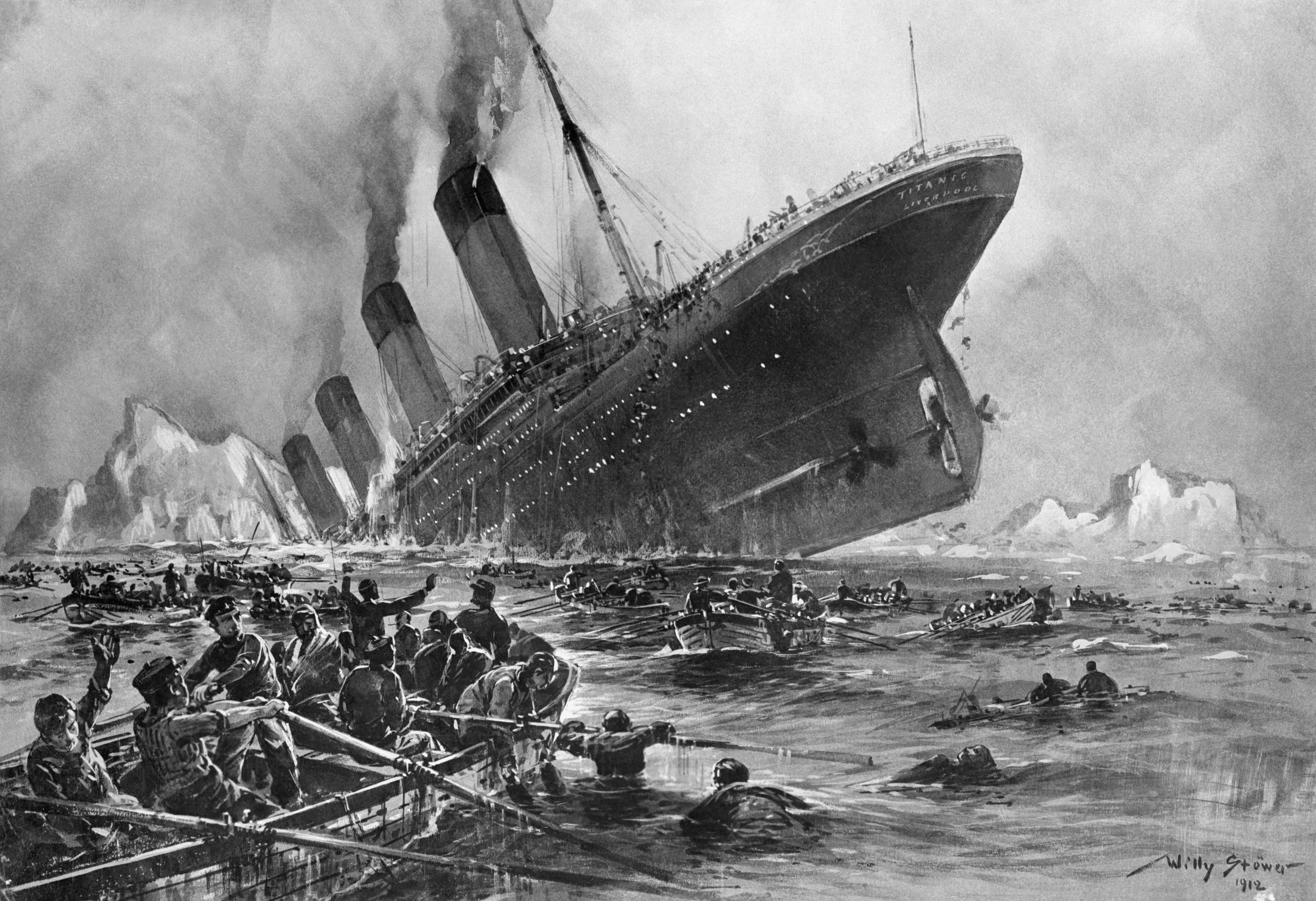
Der Untergang der "Titanic" Illustration for "Die Gartenlaube", 1912

Stöwer was a very prolific artist between 1892 and 1929, creating approximately 900 black-and-white and 335 color illustrations for 57 books, as well as posters, postcards, trading-cards, labels, brochures and calendars. An early example of his Commercial art is a series of trading cards from 1899 to 1900 which he made for the German chocolate producer Stollwerck entitled The New German Warships in Scrapbook No. 3, Series 132.

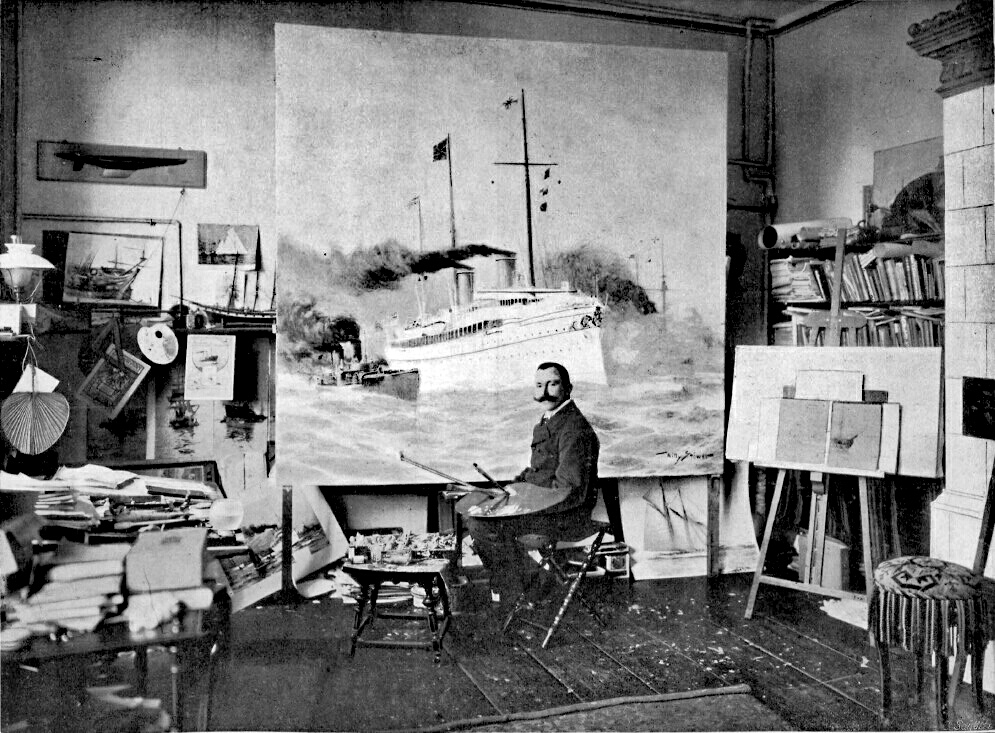
Stöwer in his studio, 1903

Stöwer's representation of the sinking of the RMS Titanic in the magazine Die Gartenlaube earned him a special popularity. He created the illustration shortly after the disaster in 1912 without detailed information; in particular, the fourth funnel did not eject black smoke as it was only for ventilation. However, the image became iconic despite minor errors and has been reprinted numerous times even to the present day. Stöwer, not known for portraiture, also painted a portrait of the Kaiser in a naval uniform, which along with some of his naval paintings, hang in the Kaiser's Room at Achilleion, the Kaiser's summer palace from 1907 to 1914 (currently a museum) on the Island of Corfu.

Other examples of Stöwer's work currently in museums include oil on canvas: Sinking of the Italian destroyer "Turbine" by Austrian destroyers on 24 May 1915. at the Military History Museum, Vienna, and: Speedboat ahead! at International Maritime Museum of Hamburg. In 1917, postcards were produced from some of his paintings for charitable aid to benefit wounded U-boat crew members and families of the deceased during World War I.

== Gallery ==
Willy Stöwer examples in various media (with associated text translated)

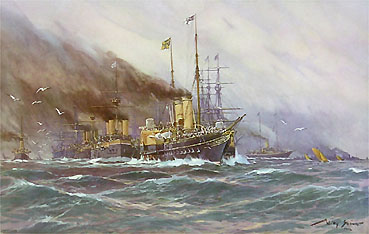
Painting (ca. 1888)
SMY Hohenzollern I

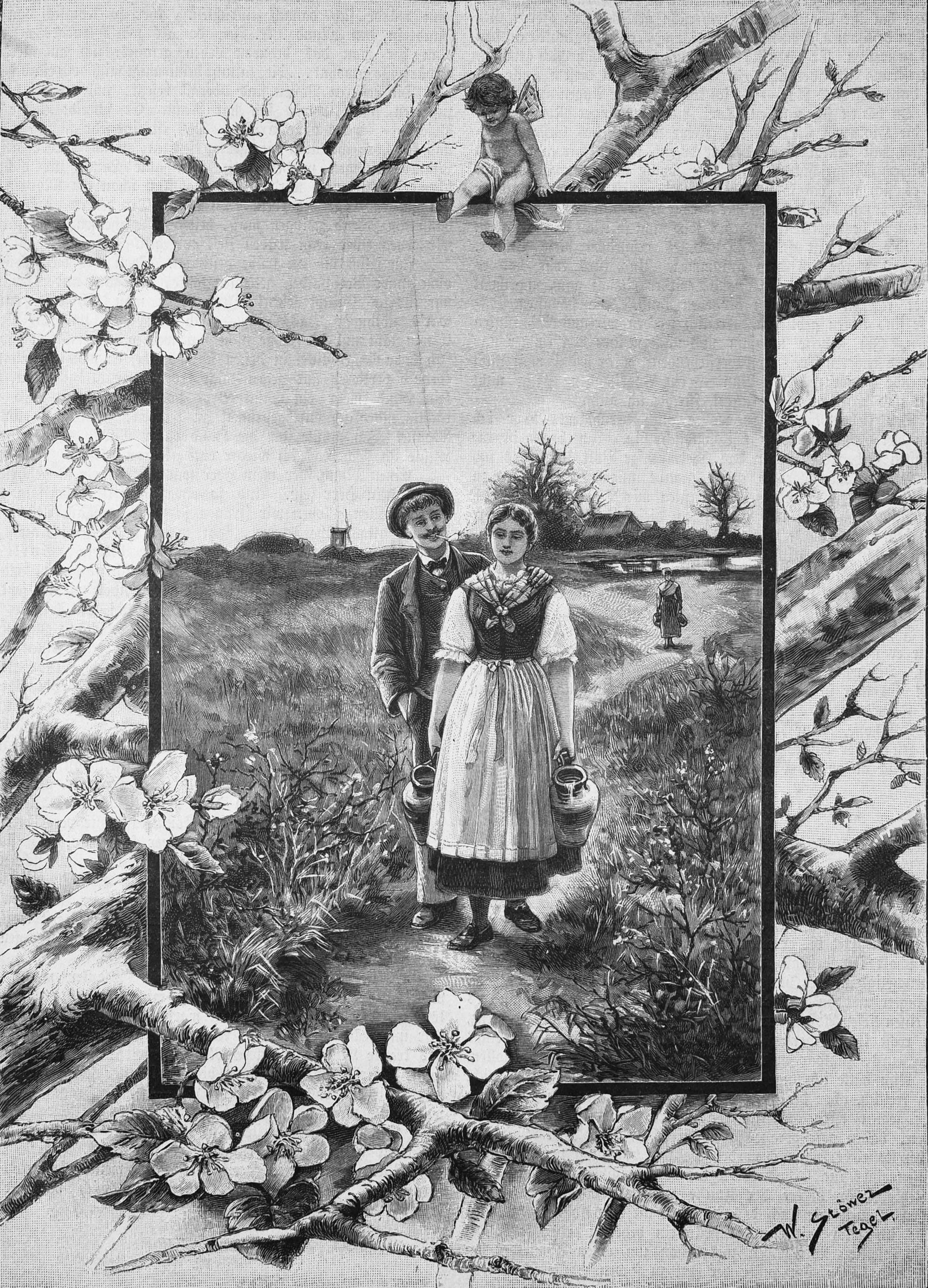
Magazine illustration for Die Gartenlaube (1893)
"The walk to the Easter Water" (Note: According to folk tradition, water collected by a maiden on Easter morning before the sun's rays touch it has special properties)

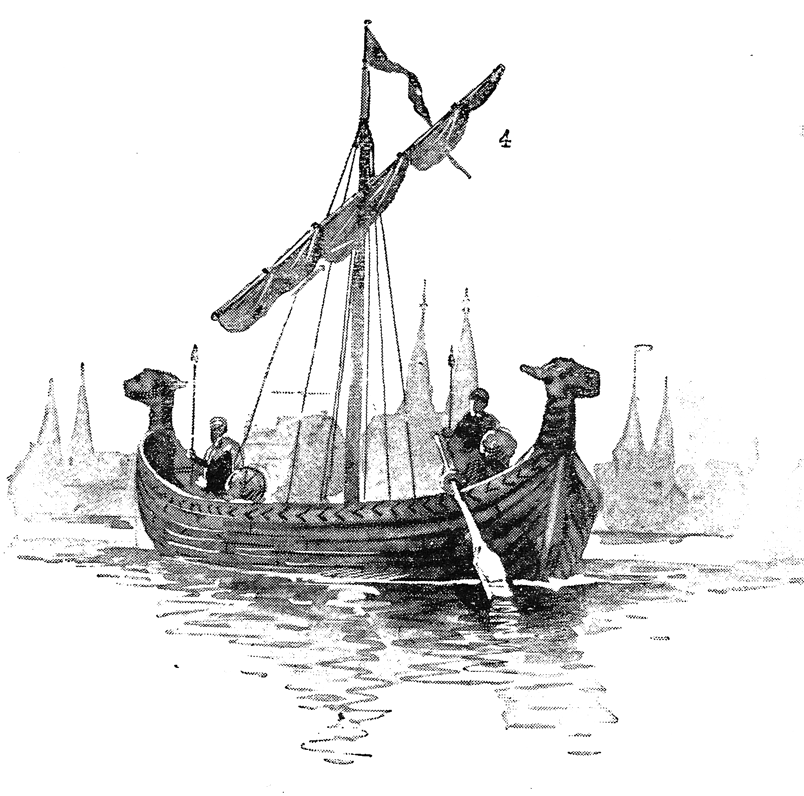
Book illustration (1902)
"Lübeck ship"
From Hanseatic League Ships of the 14th and 15th Centuries

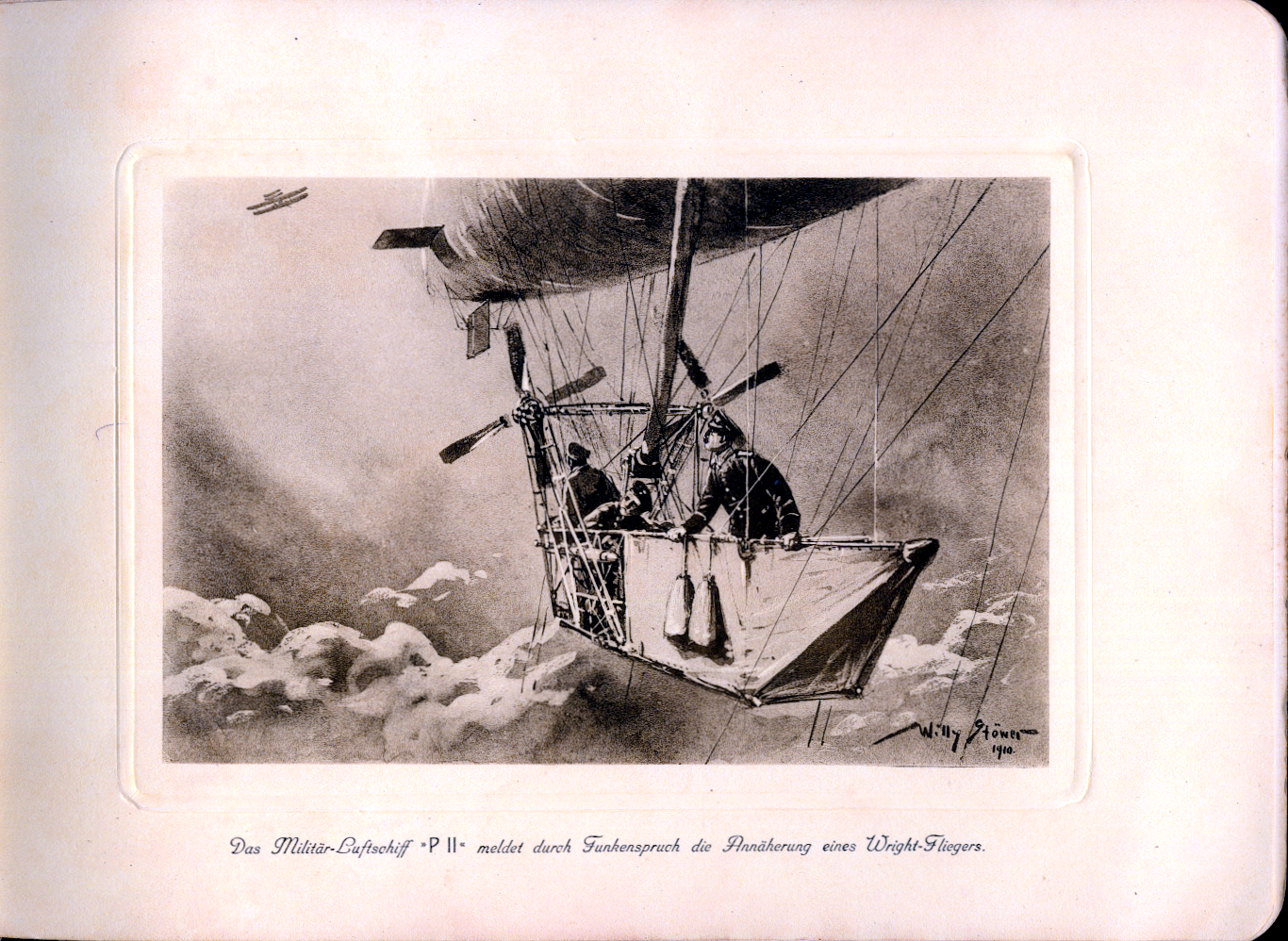
Brochure illustration (1910)
For Luftfahrzeug-GmbH
"The military airship 'P II' reports by radio the approach of a Wright Flyer."

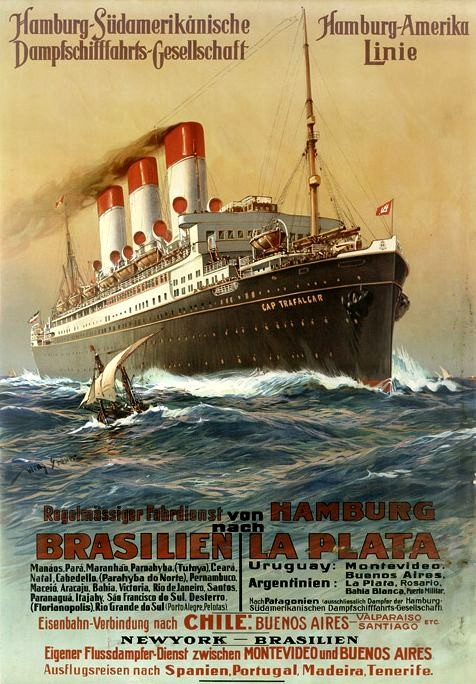
Poster (ca. 1913)
Cap Trafalgar of the Hamburg-South America Line

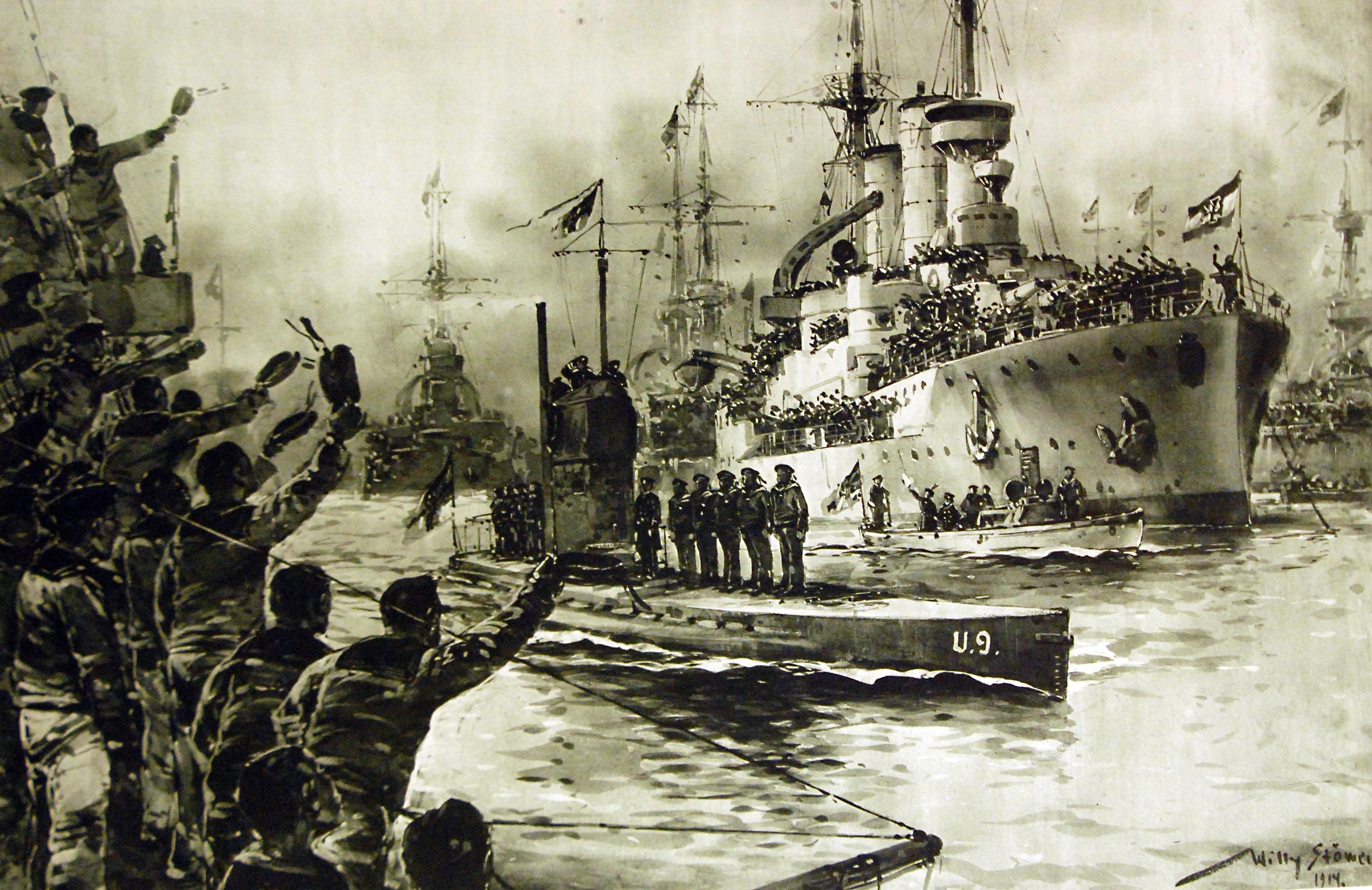
The return of U-9 to Wilhelmshaven, Germany (1914)

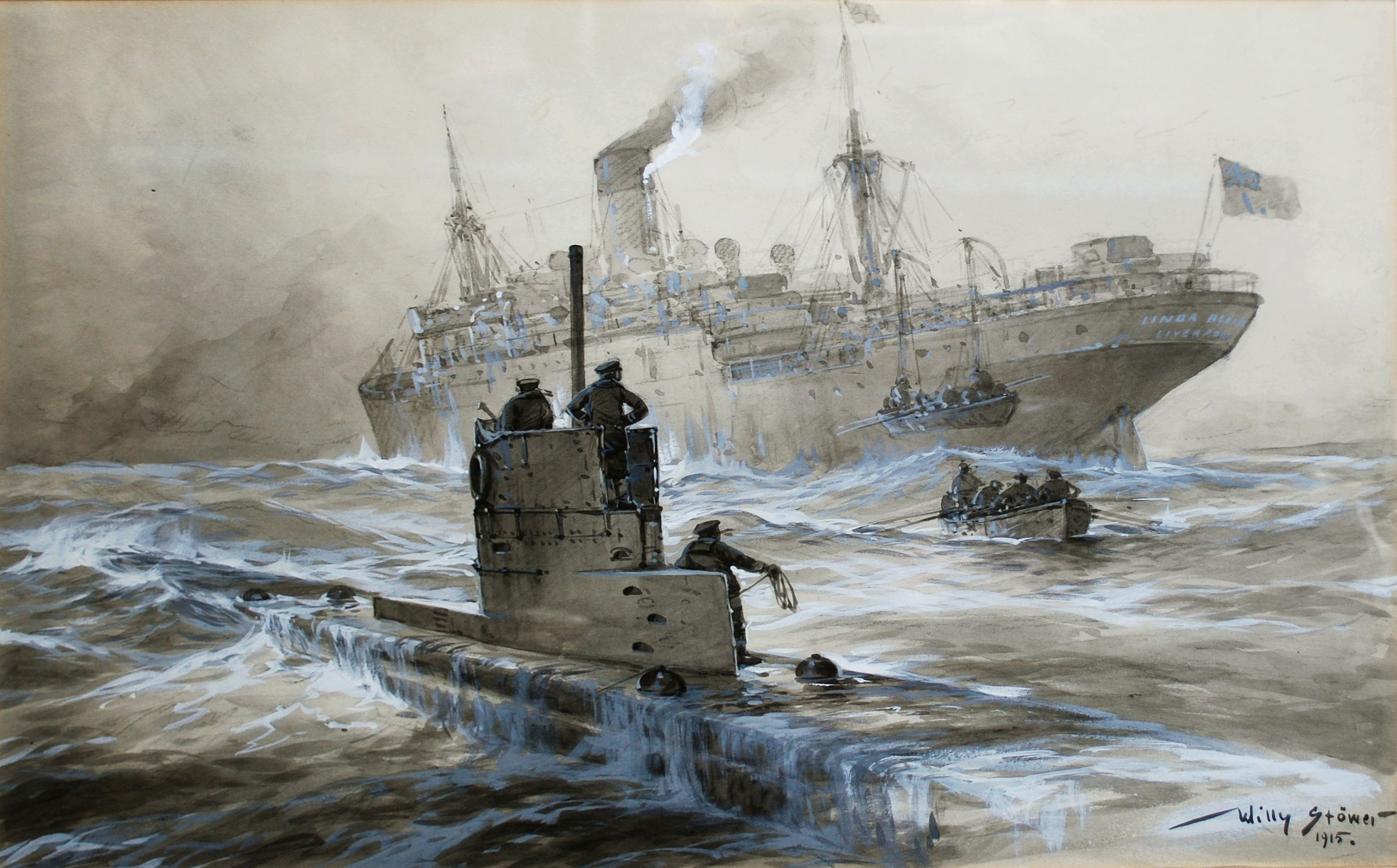
Attack of U-21 on the Linda Blanche (1915)

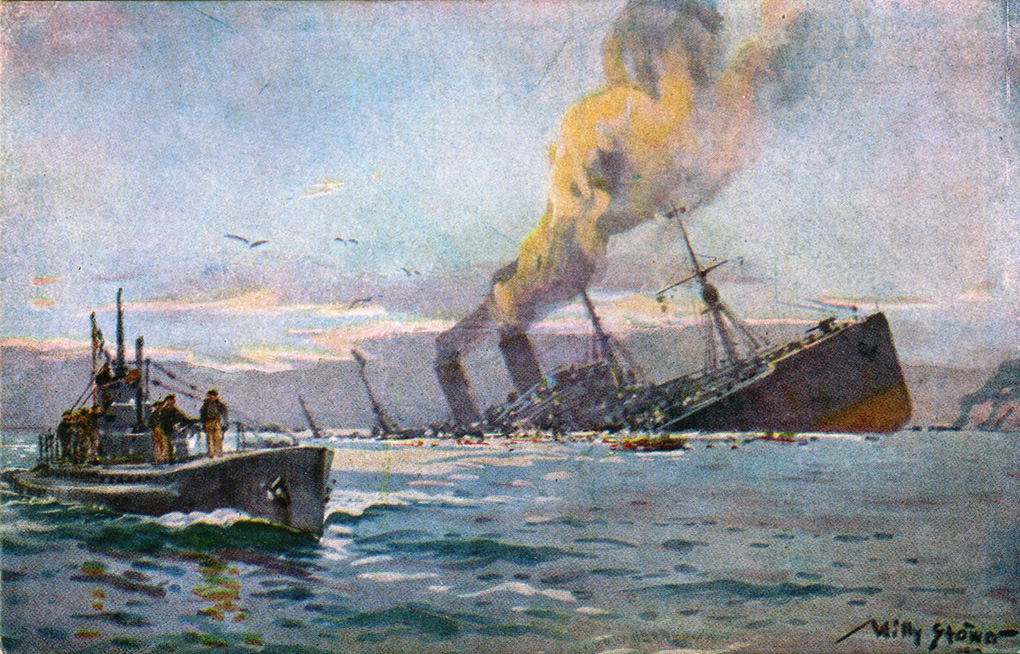
Postcard (1917)
"Sinking of a hostile armed troop carrier by German submarine in the Mediterranean Sea".

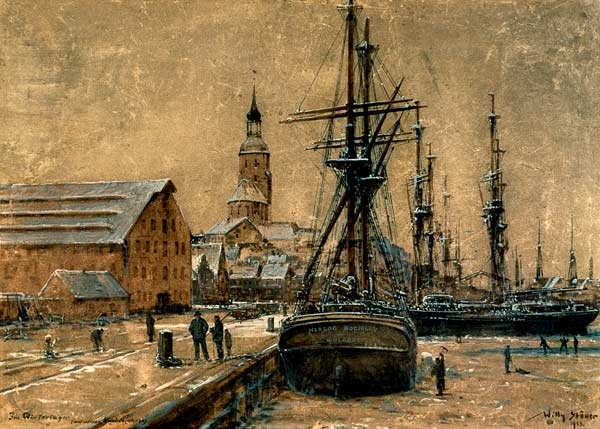
Painting (1923)
(tempera on cardboard)
"Winter Camp of the Sailors in Wolgast"

== Published works ==
In addition to his works in the visual arts, he wrote, published or edited several German books, and is credited as co-author on many more. Books by Willy Stöwer include:

- 1929 : To Sea with Brush and Palette. (Note: Willy Stöwer (1929), Zur see mit Pinsel und Palette , Braunschweig [etc.]: G. Westermann, OCLC 4360549) Includes reminiscences of the author's voyages with Kaiser Wilhelm II.
- 1916 : German U-boat Actions, in Words and Pictures. (Note: Stöwer, Prof. Willy (1916). Deutsche U-Boot-Taten, in Bild und Wort. München / Berlin: F. Bruckmann / Reichsmarinestiftung.) Published collection of reproductions of paintings of submarines; text in German on pages facing illustrations.
- 1912 : Kaiser Wilhelm II and the Navy. (Note: Wislicenus, Admiralitastrat Georg; Stöwer, Prof. Willy (1912). Kaiser Wilhelm II. Und die Marine. Berlin: August Scherl. pp. 207.) Conceived in honor of 25th anniversary of the Kaiser's rule.
- 1905 : The German Sailing Sport. (Note: Stöwer, Willy (1905). Der Deutsche Segelsport. Leipzig: F. A. Brockhaus. OCLC 39156819) (Editor) Stöwer's comprehensive compendium of the German sailing sport from the early heyday of yachting in the German Empire.
- 1901 : Marine ABC. (Note: Stöwer, Willy (1901). Marine ABC. Leipzig: Spamer. OCLC 248341146) Children's alphabet book
- 1900 : German Fleet Maneuvers: After Watercolors and Studies. (Note: Stöwer, Willy (1900). Deutsche Flottenmanöver: Nach Aquarellen u. Studien. Braunschweig: Westermann.)
- 1898 : Germany's Navy: With use of Official Materials for Original Watercolors. (Note: Stöwer, Willy (1898). Deutschlands Kriegsflotte: Mit Benutzung amtlichen Materials nach original Aquarellen. Berlin: Kutzner & Berger.)

Biography (monograph) by Jörg M. Hormann: Marine Painter of the Empire, Willy Stöwer

== See also ==
- List of German artists
