= List of ships of the Imperial German Navy =

The list of ships of the Imperial German Navy includes all ships commissioned into service with the Imperial German Navy (Kaiserliche Marine) of Germany, covering the period from 1871, the creation of the German Empire, through to the end of the Empire in 1918.

== Capital ships ==
=== Ironclad warships ===
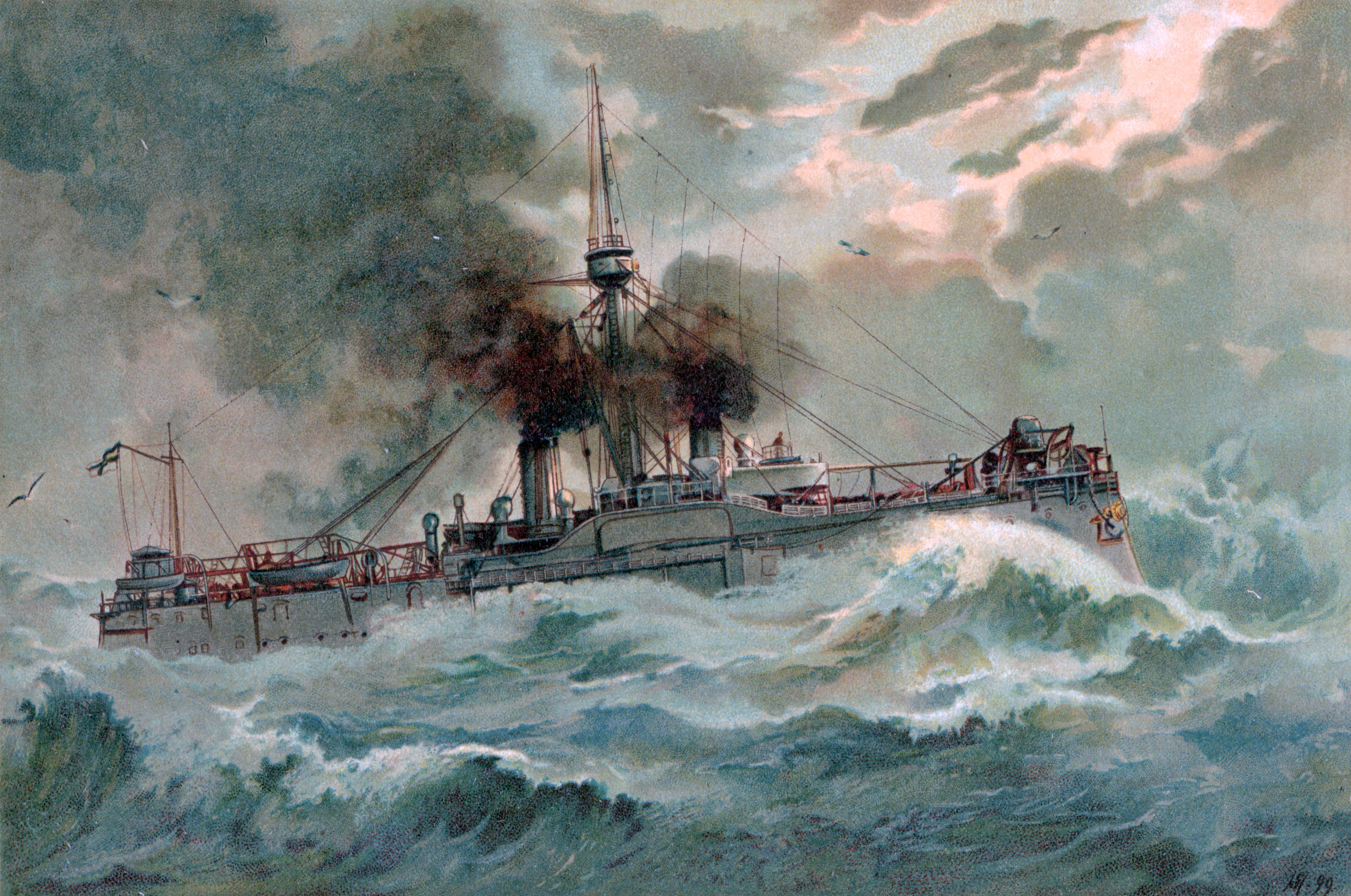
A 1902 lithograph of SMS Oldenburg, Germany's last ironclad

- Arminius class
  - SMS Arminius, 1864
- Prinz Adalbert class (1,560 tons, 5 x 36pdr guns)
  - SMS Prinz Adalbert, 1865
- Kronprinz
  - SMS Kronprinz, 1867
- Friedrich Carl class
  - SMS Friedrich Carl, 1867
- König Wilhelm class, (9,750 tons, 33 x 72pdr guns)
  - SMS König Wilhelm, 1868
- Hansa class
  - SMS Hansa, 1872
- Preussen class (6,800 tons)
  - SMS Preussen, 1873
  - SMS Friedrich der Grosse, 1874
  - SMS Grosser Kurfürst, 1875
- Kaiser class (7,319 tons, 8 x 26 cm guns)
  - SMS Kaiser, 1875
  - SMS Deutschland, 1875
- Sachsen class (7,800 tons, 6 x 26 cm guns)
  - SMS Sachsen, 1877
  - SMS Bayern, 1878
  - SMS Württemberg, 1878
  - SMS Baden, 1880
- Oldenburg class (5,250 tons, 8 x 24 cm guns)
  - SMS Oldenburg, 1884

=== Coastal defense ships ===
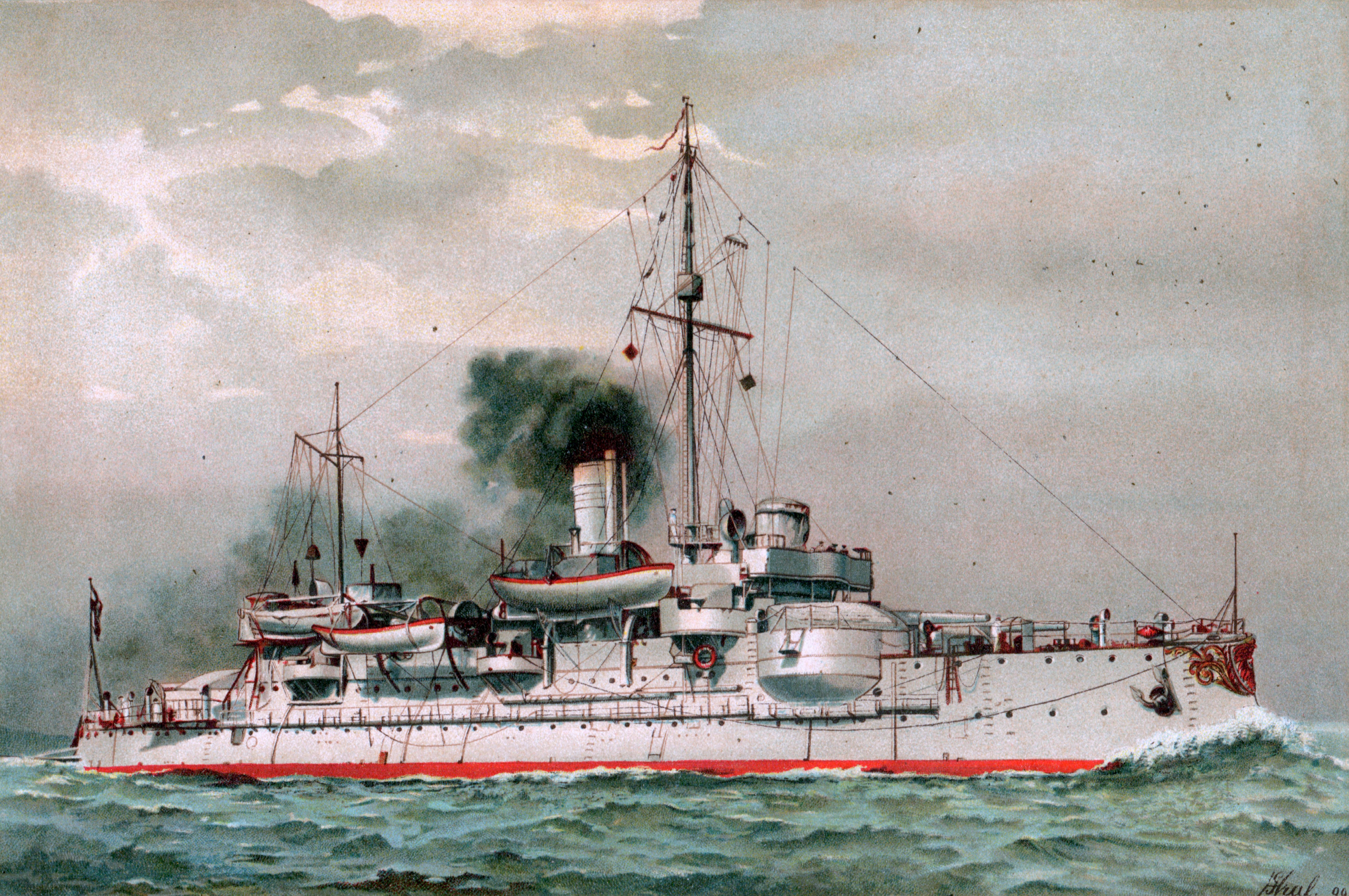
Lithograph of SMS Hagen in 1902

- Siegfried class (3,700 tons, 3 x 24 cm guns)
  - SMS Siegfried, 1889
  - SMS Beowulf, 1890
  - SMS Frithjof, 1892
  - SMS Heimdall, 1892
  - SMS Hildebrand, 1892
  - SMS Hagen, 1893
- Odin class (4,250 tons, 3 x 24 cm guns)
  - SMS Odin, 1894
  - SMS Ägir, 1895

=== Battleships ===
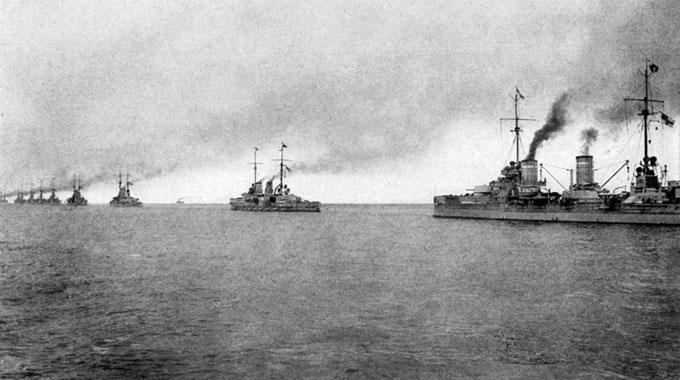
Dreadnoughts of the High Seas Fleet steam in a line of battle

Pre-Dreadnoughts

- Brandenburg class (10,500 tons, 6 x 28 cm guns)
  - SMS Kurfürst Friedrich Wilhelm, 1891
  - SMS Brandenburg, 1891
  - SMS Weissenburg, 1891
  - SMS Wörth, 1892
- Kaiser Friedrich III class (11,600 tons, 4 x 24 cm guns)
  - SMS Kaiser Friedrich III, 1896
  - SMS Kaiser Wilhelm II, 1897
  - SMS Kaiser Wilhelm der Grosse, 1899
  - SMS Kaiser Karl der Grosse, 1899
  - SMS Kaiser Barbarossa, 1900
- Wittelsbach class (12,000 tons, 4 x 24 cm guns)
  - SMS Wittelsbach, 1900
  - SMS Wettin, 1900
  - SMS Zähringen, 1901
  - SMS Schwaben, 1901
  - SMS Mecklenburg, 1901
- Braunschweig class (13,000 tons, 4 x 28 cm guns)
  - SMS Braunschweig, 1901
  - SMS Elsass, 1903
  - SMS Hessen, 1903
  - SMS Preussen, 1903
  - SMS Lothringen, 1904
- Deutschland class (13,000 tons, 4 x 28 cm guns)
  - SMS Deutschland, 1904
  - SMS Hannover, 1905
  - SMS Pommern, 1905
  - SMS Schlesien, 1906
  - SMS Schleswig-Holstein, 1906

Dreadnoughts Main dreadnought classes

- Nassau class (19,000 tons, 12 x 28 cm guns)
  - SMS Nassau, 1908
  - SMS Posen, 1908
  - SMS Rheinland, 1908
  - SMS Westfalen, 1908
- Helgoland class (23,000 tons, 12 x 30.5 cm guns)
  - SMS Helgoland, 1909
  - SMS Ostfriesland, 1909
  - SMS Thüringen, 1909
  - SMS Oldenburg, 1910
- Kaiser class (25,000 tons, 10 x 30.5 cm guns)
  - SMS Kaiser, 1911
  - SMS Kaiserin, 1911
  - SMS Prinzregent Luitpold, 1911
  - SMS Friedrich der Grosse, 1911
  - SMS König Albert, 1912
- König class (26,000 tons, 10 x 30.5 cm guns)
  - SMS König, 1913
  - SMS Grosser Kurfürst, 1913
  - SMS Markgraf, 1913
  - SMS Kronprinz, 1914
- Bayern class (29,000–32,000 tons, 8 x 38 cm guns)
  - SMS Bayern, 1915
  - SMS Baden, 1915
  - SMS Württemberg, not completed
  - SMS Sachsen, not completed
- L 20e α class (43,800–48,700 tons, 8 x 42 cm guns)
  - None built

=== Battlecruisers ===
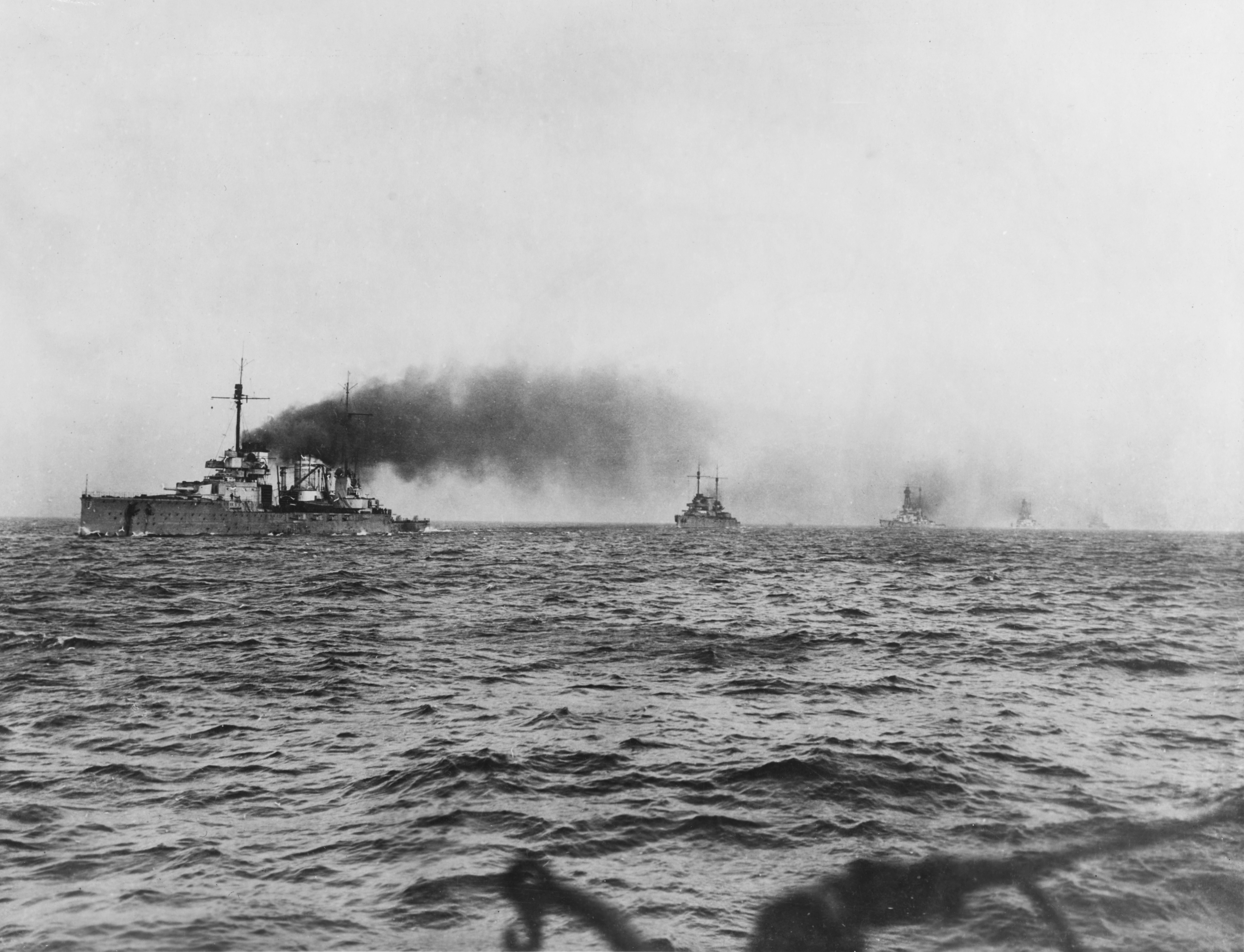
Seydlitz leads Moltke, Hindenburg, Derfflinger and Von der Tann into internment in Scapa Flow

- Von der Tann class (19,400 tons, 8 x 28 cm guns)
  - SMS Von der Tann, 1909
- Moltke class (23,000 tons, 10 x 28 cm guns)
  - SMS Moltke, 1910
  - SMS Goeben, 1911
- Seydlitz class (25,000 tons, 10 x 28 cm guns)
  - SMS Seydlitz, 1912
- Derfflinger class (27,000 tons, 8 x 30.5 cm guns)
  - SMS Derfflinger, 1913
  - SMS Lützow, 1913
  - SMS Hindenburg, 1915
- Mackensen class (35,000 tons, 8 x 35 cm guns)
  - SMS Mackensen not completed
  - SMS Graf Spee not completed
  - SMS Prinz Eitel Friedrich not completed
  - SMS Fürst Bismarck, not completed
- Ersatz Yorck class (38,000 tons 8 x 38 cm guns)
  - SMS Ersatz Yorck not completed
  - SMS Ersatz Gneisenau ordered but construction not started
  - SMS Ersatz Scharnhorst ordered but construction not started

== Cruisers ==
=== Protected cruisers ===
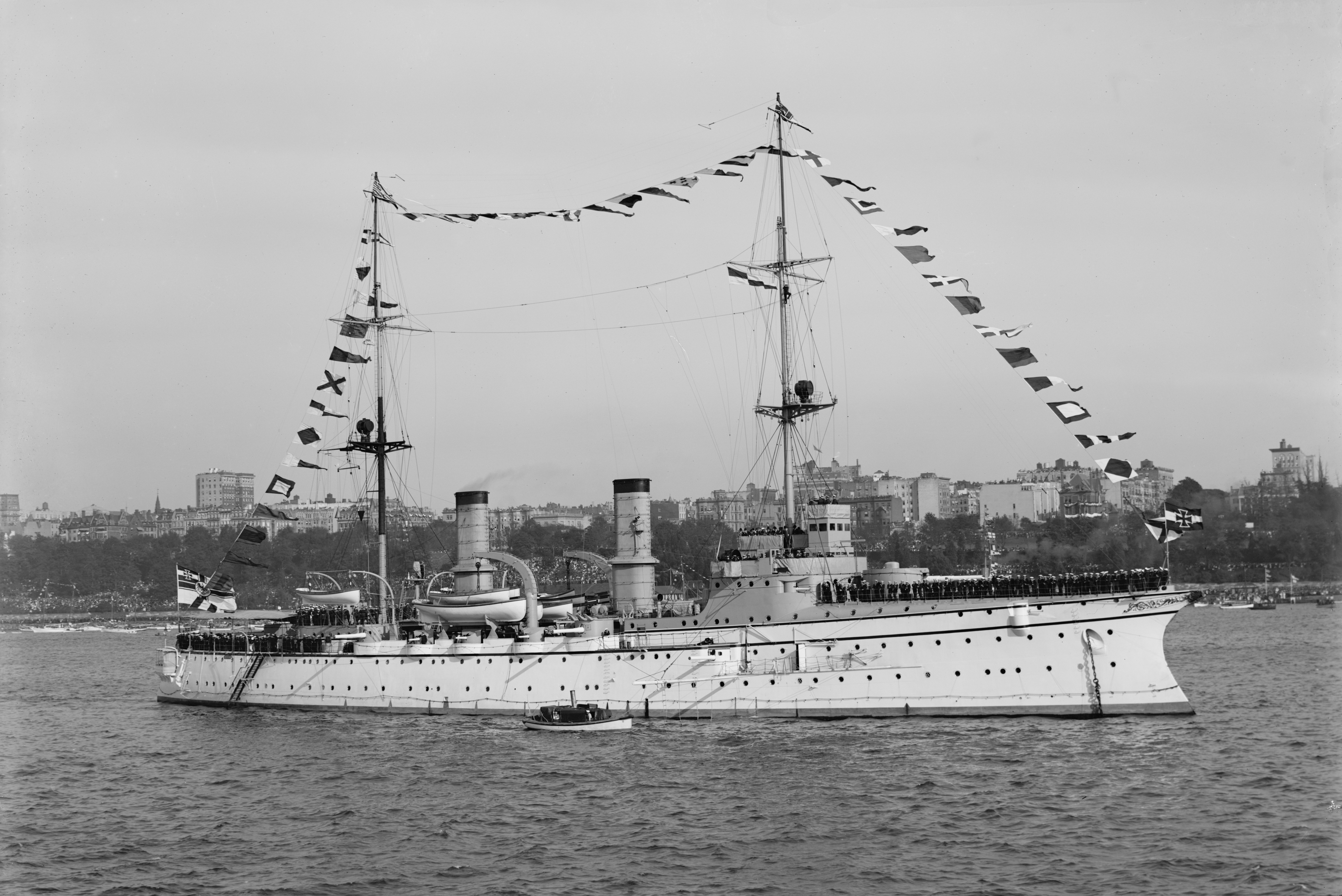
Hertha on a visit to the United States in 1909

- Irene class (5,000 tons, 14 x 15 cm guns, 4 x 15 cm guns)
  - SMS Irene
  - SMS Prinzess Wilhelm
- Kaiserin Augusta class (6,000 tons, 4 x 15 cm guns)
  - SMS Kaiserin Augusta, 1892
- Victoria Louise class (5,700 tons, 2 x 21 cm guns, 8 x 15 cm guns)
  - SMS Victoria Louise, 1897
  - SMS Hertha, 1897
  - SMS Freya, 1897
  - SMS Vineta, 1897
  - SMS Hansa, 1898

=== Armored cruisers ===
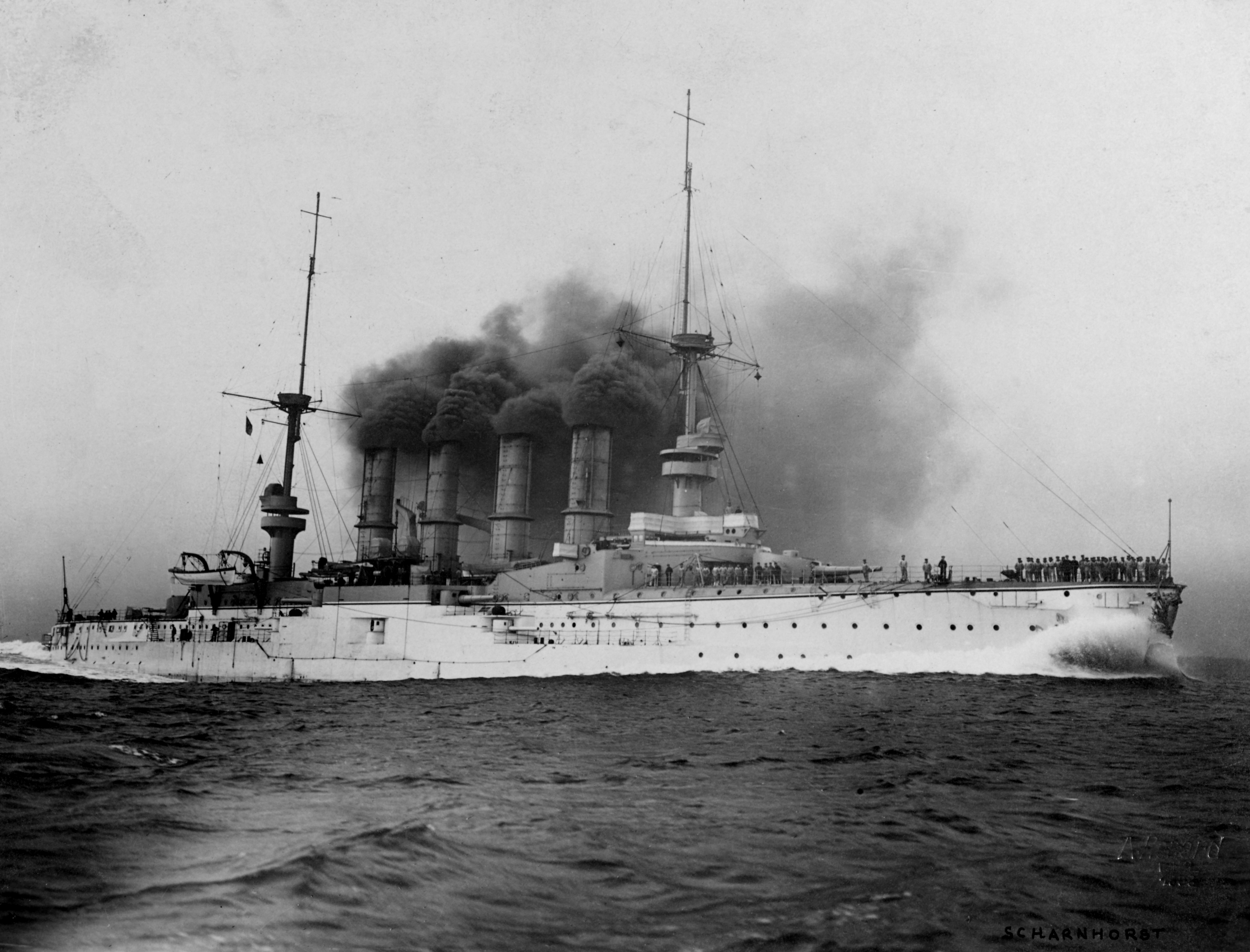
Scharnhorst steaming at top speed

- Fürst Bismarck class (10,700 tons, 4 x 24 cm guns, 12 x 15 cm guns)
  - SMS Fürst Bismarck, 1897
- Prinz Heinrich class (9,000 tons, 2 x 24 cm guns)
  - SMS Prinz Heinrich, 1900
- Prinz Adalbert class (9,000 tons, 4 x 21 cm guns)
  - SMS Prinz Adalbert, 1901
  - SMS Friedrich Carl, 1901
- Roon class (10,000 tons, 4 x 21 cm guns)
  - SMS Roon, 1903
  - SMS Yorck, 1904
- Scharnhorst class (11,600 tons, 8 x 21 cm guns)
  - SMS Scharnhorst, 1906
  - SMS Gneisenau, 1906
- Blücher class (15,800 tons, 12 x 21 cm guns)
  - SMS Blücher, 1908

=== Unprotected cruisers ===
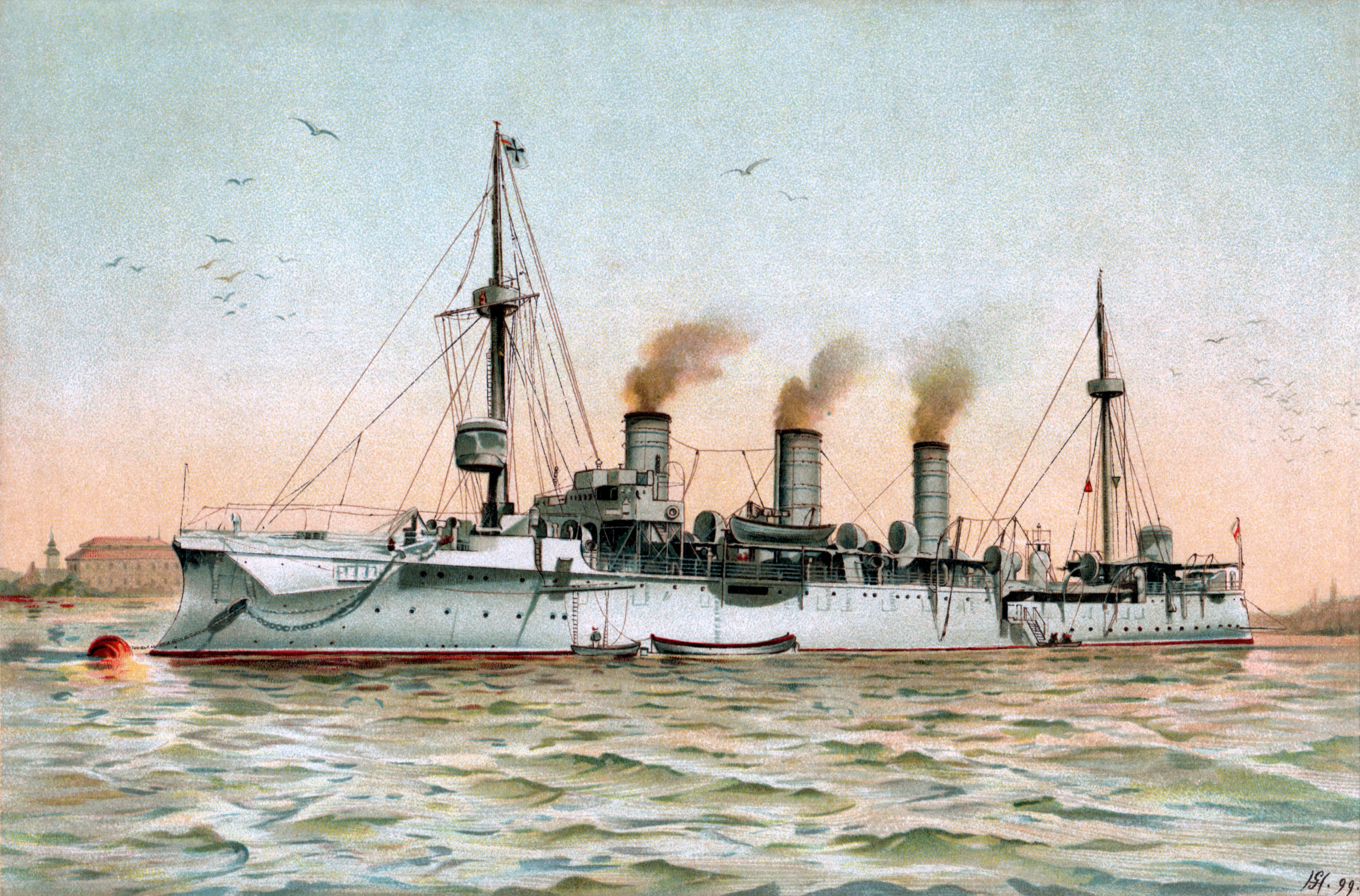
1902 lithograph of SMS Gefion

- Schwalbe class (1,359 tons, 8 x 10.5 cm guns)
  - SMS Schwalbe, 1887
  - SMS Sperber, 1888
- Bussard class (1,650 tons, 8 x 10.5 cm guns)
  - SMS Bussard, 1890
  - SMS Falke, 1891
  - SMS Seeadler, 1892
  - SMS Cormoran, 1892
  - SMS Condor, 1892
  - SMS Geier, 1894
- Gefion class (3,700 tons, 10 x 10.5 cm guns)
  - SMS Gefion, 1893

=== Light cruisers ===
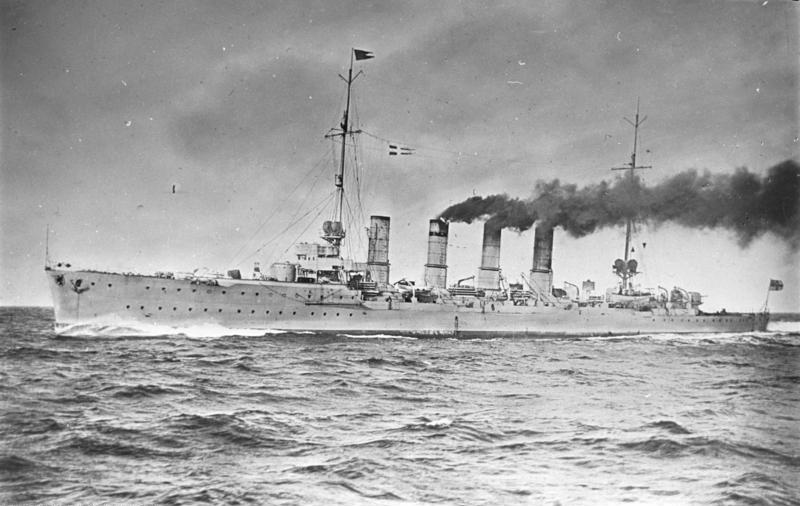
Karlsruhe underway

- Gazelle class (2,700 tons, 10 x 10.5 cm guns)
  - SMS Gazelle, 1898
  - SMS Niobe
  - SMS Nymphe
  - SMS Thetis
  - SMS Ariadne
  - SMS Amazone
  - SMS Medusa
  - SMS Frauenlob
  - SMS Arcona
  - SMS Undine, 1902
- Bremen class (3,300 tons 10 x 10.5 cm guns, 2 x 15 cm guns)
  - SMS Bremen, 1903
  - SMS Hamburg, 1903
  - SMS Berlin, 1903
  - SMS Lübeck, 1904
  - SMS München, 1904
  - SMS Leipzig, 1905
  - SMS Danzig, 1905
- Königsberg class (1905) (3,400 tons 10 x 10.5 cm guns)
  - SMS Königsberg, 1905
  - SMS Stettin, 1907
  - SMS Stuttgart, 1906
  - SMS Nürnberg, 1906
- Dresden class (3,700 tons 10 x 10.5 cm guns)
  - SMS Dresden, 1907
  - SMS Emden, 1908
- Kolberg class (4,400 tons 12 x 10.5 cm guns, 6 x 15 cm guns)
  - SMS Kolberg, 1908
  - SMS Mainz, 1909
  - SMS Cöln, 1909
  - SMS Augsburg, 1909
- Magdeburg class (4,500 tons 12 x 10.5 cm guns, 7 x 15 cm guns)
  - SMS Magdeburg, 1911
  - SMS Breslau, 1911
  - SMS Strassburg, 1911
  - SMS Stralsund, 1911
- Karlsruhe class (4,900 tons 12 x 10.5 cm guns)
  - SMS Karlsruhe, 1912
  - SMS Rostock, 1912
- Graudenz class (4,900 tons 12 x 10.5 cm guns, 7 x 15 cm guns)
  - SMS Graudenz, 1913
  - SMS Regensburg, 1914
- Pillau class (4,400 tons 8 x 15 cm guns)
  - SMS Pillau, 1914
  - SMS Elbing, 1914
- Wiesbaden class (5,000 tons 8 x 15 cm guns)
  - SMS Wiesbaden, 1915
  - SMS Frankfurt, 1915
- Königsberg class (1915) (5,400 tons 8 x 15 cm guns)
  - SMS Königsberg, 1915
  - SMS Karlsruhe, 1915
  - SMS Emden, 1915
  - SMS Nürnberg, 1916
- Cöln class (5,600 tons 8 x 15 cm guns)
  - SMS Cöln, 1916
  - SMS Dresden, 1917

=== Minelaying cruisers ===
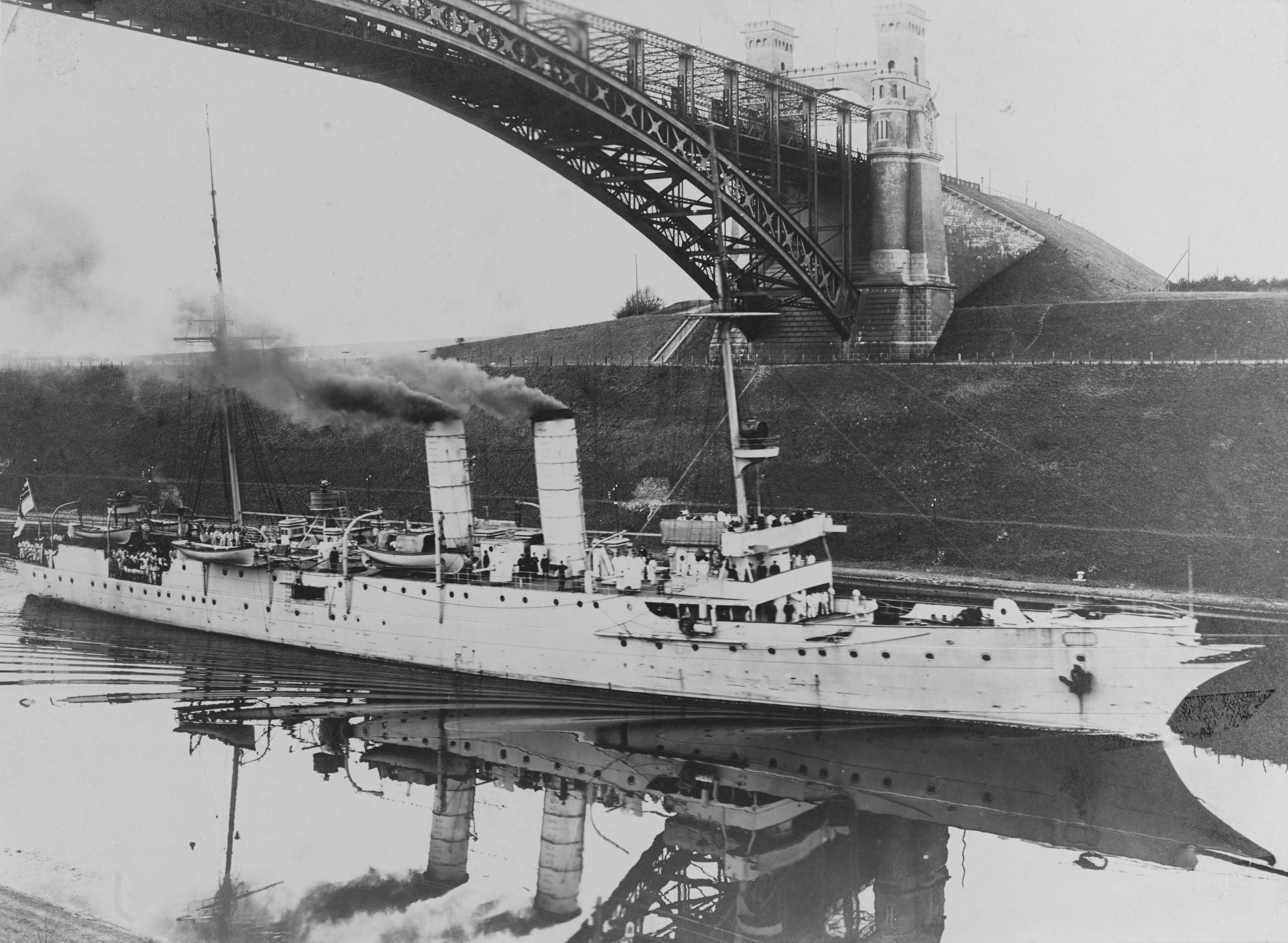
Nautilus passing under the Levensau High Bridge in the Kaiser Wilhelm Canal

- Nautilus class (2,000 tons, 8 x 8.8 cm guns)
  - SMS Nautilus, 1907
  - SMS Albatross, 1907
- Brummer class (4,400 tons, 4 x 15 cm guns)
  - SMS Brummer, 1915
  - SMS Bremse, 1915

== Aircraft carriers ==
- I class (12,585 tons, 23–29 aircraft)
  - I, 1915 passenger ship Ausonia and under conversion as naval vessel 1918, not completed and scrapped 1922

== Auxiliary minelayers ==
- SMS Königin Luise-2 × 37mm guns
- SMS Deutschland-4 × 88mm guns, 2 × 50mm guns

== Auxiliary warship ==
- SMS Graf von Goetzen, 1915 1,575 t [1 × 10.5 cm (4 in) gun; 1 × 8.8 cm (3 in) gun;2 × 37 mm revolver guns]

== Avisos ==
Lithograph of Greif (left), Meteor (center), and Jagd (right) by Willy Stöwer

- Preussischer Adler class
  - SMS Preussischer Adler, 1846
- Grille class
  - SMS Grille, 1857
- Loreley class
  - SMS Loreley, 1859
- Falke class
  - SMS Falke, 1865
- Loreley class
  - SMS Pommerania, 1864
- Zieten class (1,152 tons, 6 x 5 cm guns)
  - SMS Zieten, 1876
- Blitz class (1,486 tons, 6 x 8.8 cm guns)
  - SMS Blitz, 1882
  - SMS Pfeil, 1882
- Greif class (2,266 tons, 2 x 10.5 cm guns, 8 x 8.8 cm guns)
  - SMS Greif, 1886
- Wacht class (1,499 tons, 3 x 10.5 cm guns, 4 x 8.8 cm guns)
  - SMS Wacht, 1887
  - SMS Jagd, 1888
- Meteor class (1,078 tons, 4 x 8.8 cm guns)
  - SMS Meteor, 1890
  - SMS Comet, 1892
- Hela class (2,000 tons, 4 x 8.8 cm guns)
  - SMS Hela, 1895

== Gunboats ==
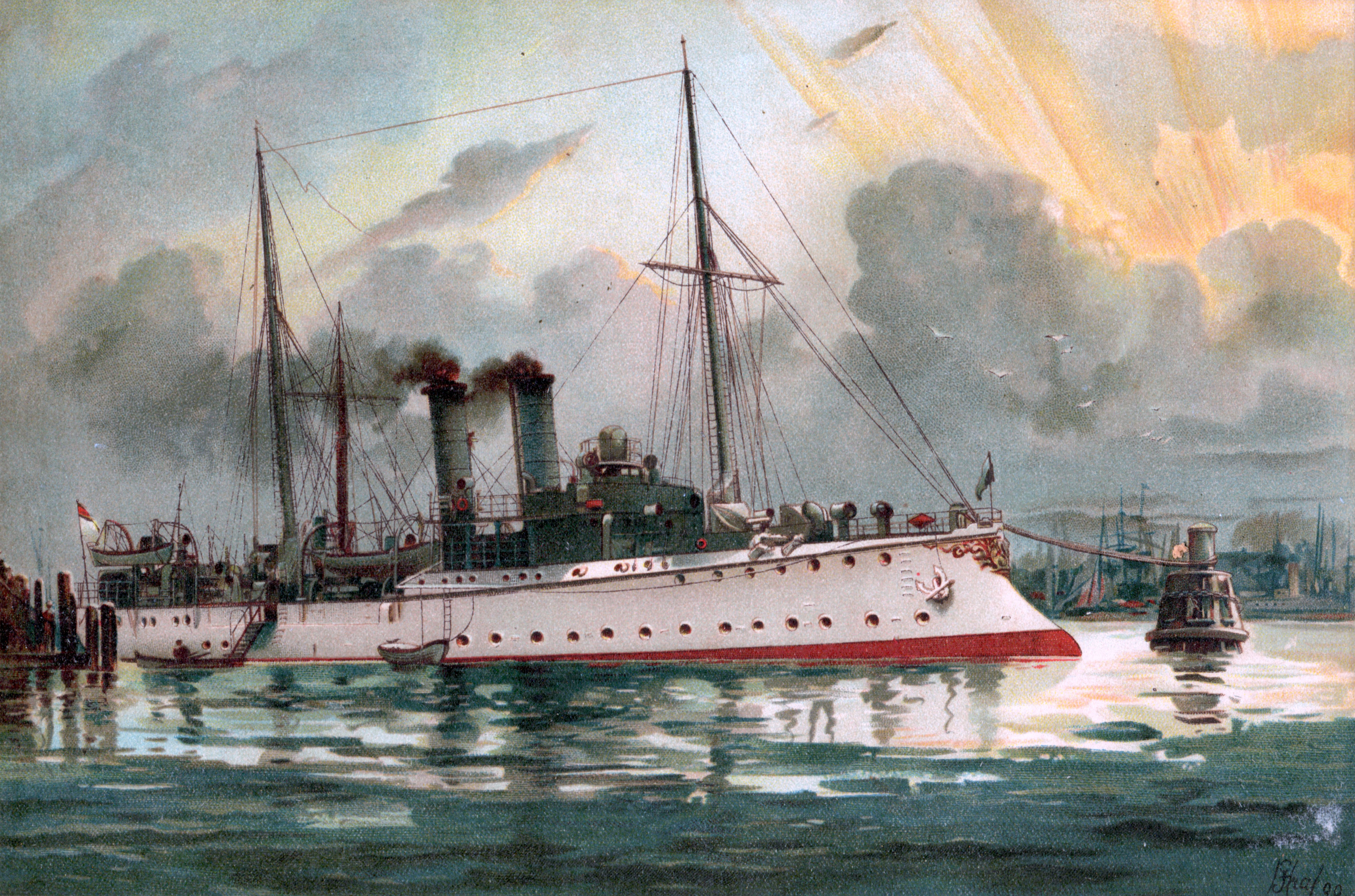
1902 lithograph of SMS Iltis

- Jäger class
  - SMS Jäger, 1860
  - SMS Fuchs, 1860
  - SMS Hay, 1860
  - SMS Scorpion, 1860
  - SMS Sperber, 1860
  - SMS Hyäne, 1860
  - SMS Habicht, 1860
  - SMS Pfeil, 1860
  - SMS Natter, 1860
  - SMS Schwalbe, 1860
  - SMS Salamander, 1860
  - SMS Wespe, 1860
  - SMS Tiger, 1860
  - SMS Wolf, 1860
- Camäleon class (422 tons, 1 x 15 cm guns, 2 x 12 cm guns)
  - SMS Camäleon, 1860
  - SMS Comet, 1860
  - SMS Cyclop, 1860
  - SMS Delphin, 1860
  - SMS Blitz, 1862
  - SMS Basilisk, 1862
  - SMS Meteor, 1865
  - SMS Drache, 1865
- Albatross class (786 tons, 2 x 15 cm guns, 2 x 12 cm guns)
  - SMS Albatross, 1871
  - SMS Nautilus, 1871
- Wespe class (1,163 tons, 1 x 30.5 cm gun, 2 x 8.7 cm guns)
  - SMS Wespe, 1876
  - SMS Viper, 1876
  - SMS Biene, 1876
  - SMS Mücke, 1877
  - SMS Scorpion, 1877
  - SMS Basilisk, 1878
  - SMS Camaeleon, 1878
  - SMS Crocodill, 1879
  - SMS Salamander, 1880
  - SMS Natter, 1880
  - SMS Hummel, 1881
- Wolf class (570 tons, 2 x 12.5 cm guns, 2 x 8.7 cm guns)
  - SMS Wolf, 1878
  - SMS Hyäne, 1878
  - SMS Iltis, 1878
- Habicht class (840 tons, 1 x 15 cm guns, 4 x 12 cm guns)
  - SMS Habicht, 1879
  - SMS Möwe, 1879
  - SMS Adler, 1879
- Hay class (247 tons, 4 x 8.7 cm guns)
  - SMS Hay, 1881
- Brummer class (867 tons, 1 x 21 cm gun, 1 x 8.7 cm gun)
  - SMS Brummer, 1884
  - SMS Bremse, 1884
- Eber class (735 tons, 3 x 10.5 cm guns)
  - SMS Eber, 1887
- Iltis class (1,050 tons, 2 x 10.5 cm guns, 4 x 8.8 cm guns)
  - SMS Iltis, 1898
  - SMS Jaguar, 1898
  - SMS Tiger, 1899
  - SMS Luchs, 1899
  - SMS Panther, 1901
  - SMS Eber, 1903

== Corvettes ==
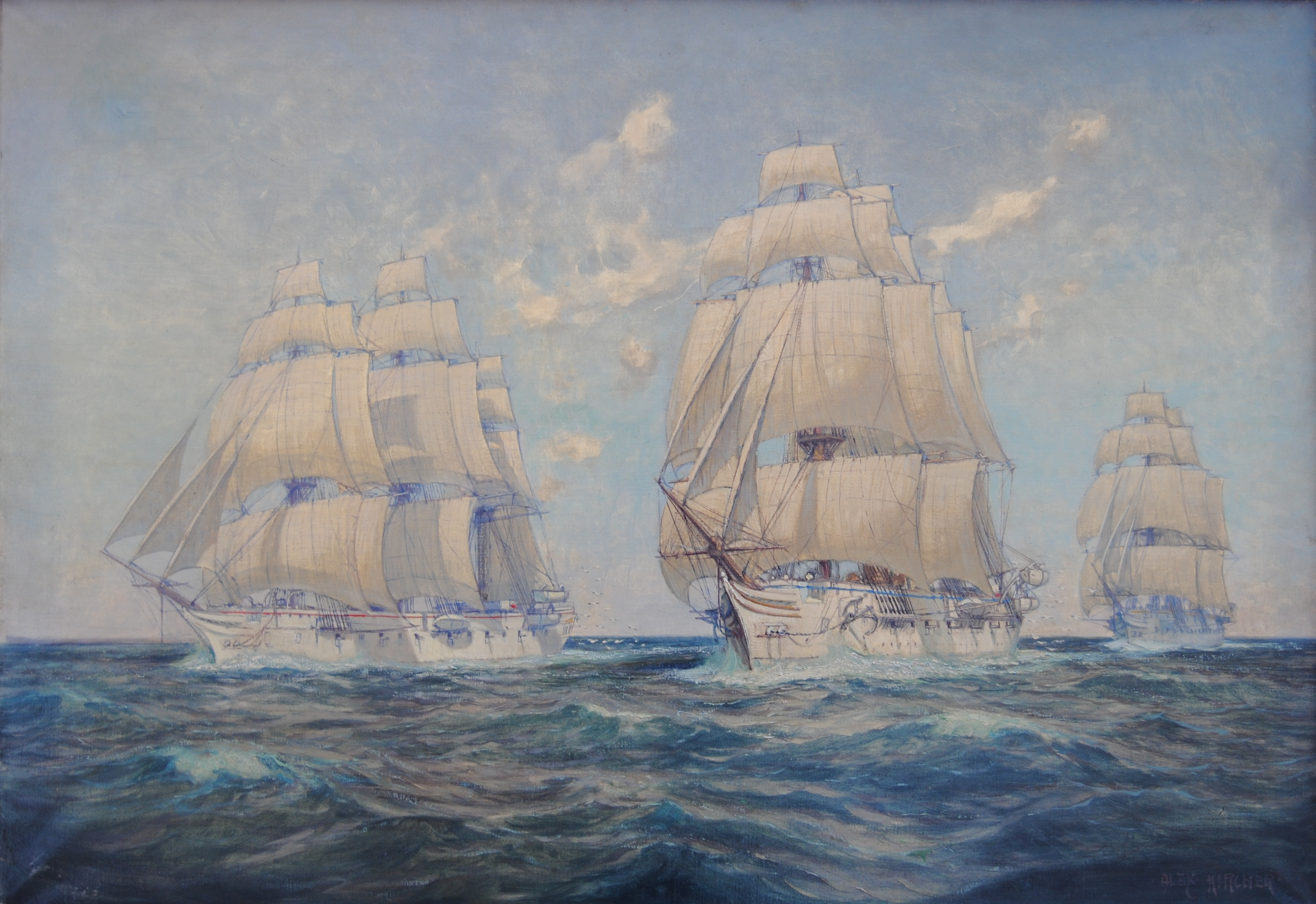
A painting of Stosch, Stein, and Gneisenau under sail, by Alexander Kircher

- Nymphe class
  - SMS Nymphe
  - SMS Medusa
- Augusta class
  - SMS Augusta
  - SMS Victoria
- Ariadne class
  - SMS Ariadne
  - SMS Luise
  - SMS Freya
- Leipzig class
  - SMS Leipzig
  - SMS Prinz Adalbert
- Bismarck class (3,386 tonnes, 16 x 15 cm L/22 guns)
  - SMS Bismarck
  - SMS Blücher
  - SMS Stosch
  - SMS Moltke
  - SMS Gneisenau
  - SMS Stein
- Carola class
  - SMS Carola
  - SMS Olga
  - SMS Marie
  - SMS Sophie
  - SMS Alexandrine
  - SMS Arcona
- SMS Nixe
- SMS Charlotte

== Torpedo-boats and destroyers ==
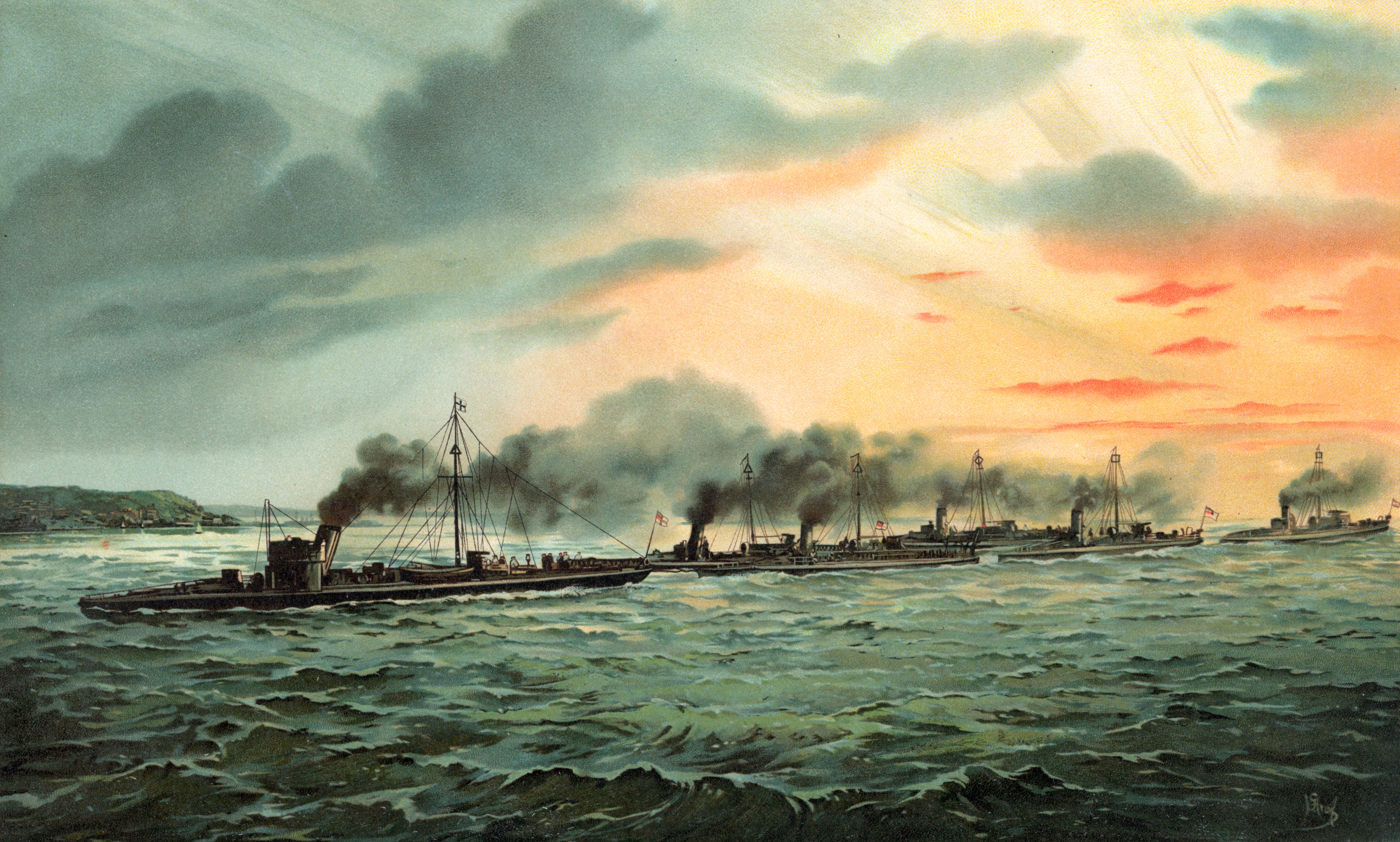
Illustration of a division of torpedo boats in 1902

In the Imperial German Navy, there was no clear distinction between torpedo boats and torpedo boat destroyers, which were all numbered in the same series, the number being preceded by a letter that represented the building contractor. A new numbering series began in 1911; hence years of construction are appended in brackets below, to distinguish the two series.

- S90 class (1898–1907)
  - SMS S90
  - SMS S91
  - SMS S92
  - SMS S93
  - SMS S94
  - SMS S95
  - SMS S96
  - SMS S97
  - SMS S98
  - SMS S99
  - SMS S100
  - SMS S101
  - SMS S102
  - SMS S103
  - SMS S104
  - SMS S105
  - SMS S106
  - SMS S107

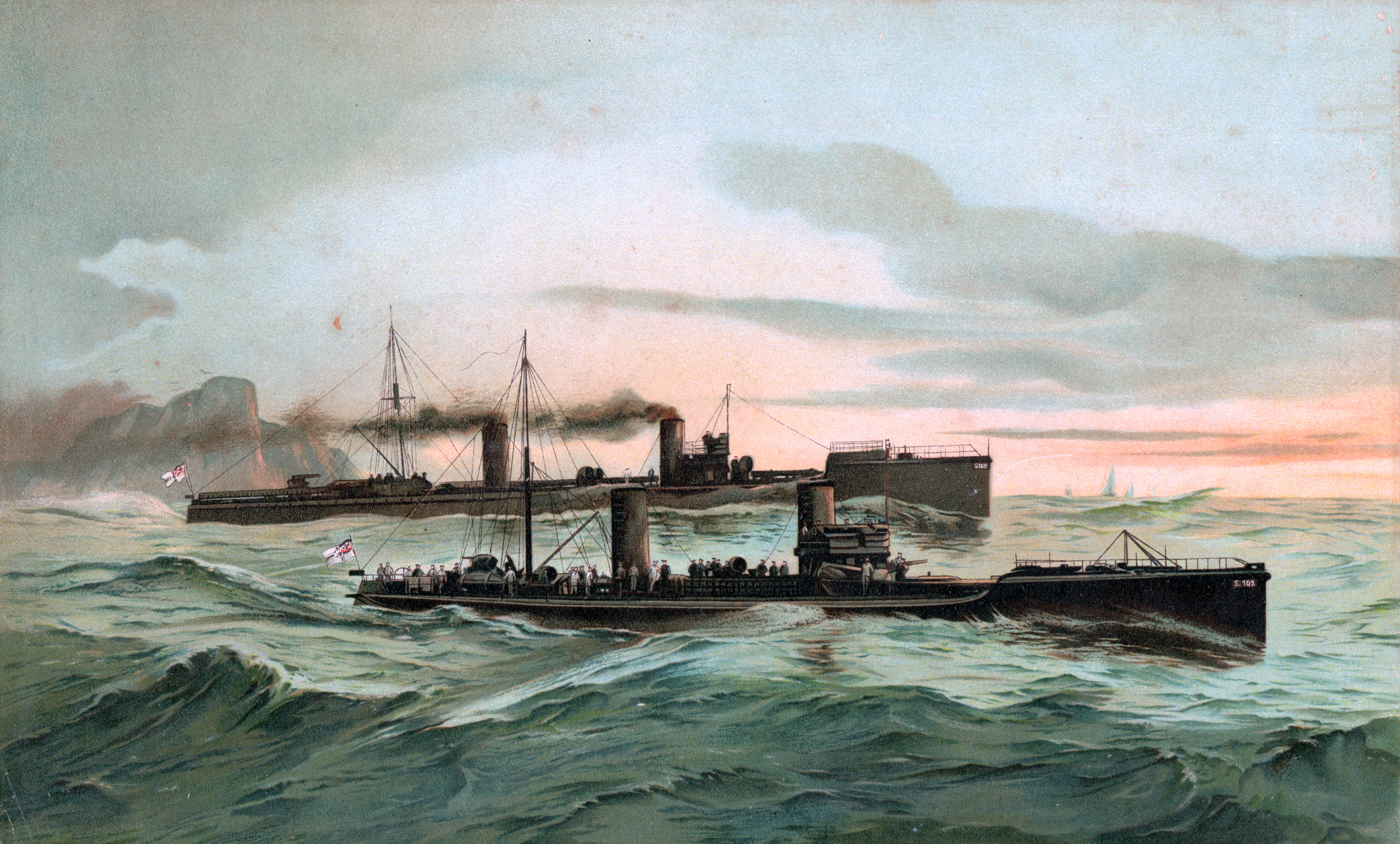
Illustration of G108 and S102 in 1902

  - SMS G108
  - SMS G109
  - SMS G110
  - SMS G111
  - SMS G112
  - SMS G113
  - SMS S114
  - SMS S115
  - SMS S116
  - SMS S117
  - SMS S118
  - SMS S119
  - SMS S120
  - SMS S121
  - SMS S122
  - SMS S123
  - SMS S124
  - SMS S125
  - SMS S126
  - SMS S127
  - SMS S128
  - SMS S129
  - SMS S130
  - SMS S131
  - SMS G132
  - SMS G133
  - SMS G134
  - SMS G135
  - SMS G136

G137 on trials in 1907

  - SMS G137
- S138 class (1906–11)
  - SMS S138
  - SMS S139
  - SMS S140
  - SMS S141
  - SMS S142
  - SMS S143
  - SMS S144
  - SMS S145
  - SMS S146
  - SMS S147
  - SMS S148
  - SMS S149
  - SMS V150
  - SMS V151
  - SMS V152
  - SMS V153
  - SMS V154
  - SMS V155
  - SMS V156
  - SMS V157
  - SMS V158
  - SMS V159
  - SMS V160
  - SMS V161
  - SMS V162
  - SMS V163
  - SMS V164
  - SMS S165
  - SMS S166
  - SMS S167
  - SMS S168
  - SMS G169
  - SMS G170
  - SMS G171
  - SMS G172
  - SMS G173
  - SMS G174
  - SMS G175
  - SMS S176
  - SMS S177
  - SMS S178
  - SMS S179
  - SMS V180
  - SMS V181
  - SMS V182
  - SMS V183
  - SMS V184
  - SMS V185
  - SMS V186
  - SMS V187
  - SMS V188
  - SMS V189
  - SMS V190
  - SMS V191
  - SMS G192
  - SMS G193
  - SMS G194
  - SMS G195
  - SMS G196
  - SMS G197
- V1 class (1911–13)
  - SMS V1
  - SMS V2
  - SMS V3
  - SMS V4
  - SMS V5
  - SMS V6
  - SMS G7
  - SMS G8
  - SMS G9
  - SMS G10
  - SMS G11
  - SMS G12
  - SMS S13
  - SMS S14
  - SMS S15
  - SMS S16
  - SMS S17
  - SMS S18
  - SMS S19
  - SMS S20
  - SMS S21
  - SMS S22
  - SMS S23
  - SMS S24
- V25 class (1913–15)
  - SMS V25
  - SMS V26
  - SMS V27
  - SMS V28
  - SMS V29
  - SMS V30
  - SMS S31 (1913)
  - SMS S32 (1914)
  - SMS S33 (1914)
  - SMS S34 (1914)
  - SMS S35 (1914)
  - SMS S36 (1914)
  - SMS G37
  - SMS G38
  - SMS G39
  - SMS G40
  - SMS G41
  - SMS G42
  - SMS V43
  - SMS V44
  - SMS V45
  - SMS V46
  - SMS V47
  - SMS V48
  - SMS S49 (1915)
  - SMS S50
  - SMS S51
  - SMS S52
  - SMS S53
  - SMS S54
  - SMS S55
  - SMS S56
  - SMS S57
  - SMS S58
  - SMS S59
  - SMS S60
  - SMS S61
  - SMS S62
  - SMS S63
  - SMS S64
  - SMS S65
  - SMS S66
  - SMS V67
  - SMS V68
  - SMS V69
  - SMS V70
  - SMS V71
  - SMS V72
  - SMS V73
  - SMS V74
  - SMS V75
  - SMS V76
  - SMS V77
  - SMS V78
  - SMS V79
  - SMS V80
  - SMS V81
  - SMS V82
  - SMS V83
  - SMS V84
  - SMS G85
  - SMS G86
  - SMS G87
  - SMS G88
  - SMS G89
  - SMS G90
  - SMS G91
  - SMS G92
  - SMS G93
  - SMS G94
  - SMS G95
- B97 class
  - SMS B97
  - SMS B98
  - SMS V99
  - SMS V100
  - SMS B109
  - SMS B110
  - SMS B111
  - SMS B112
- G101 class
  - SMS G101
  - SMS G102
  - SMS G103
  - SMS G104
- V105 class
  - SMS V105
  - SMS V106
  - SMS V107
  - SMS V108
- S113 class
  - SMS S113
  - SMS S114
  - SMS S115
  - SMS V116
  - SMS V117
  - SMS V118
  - SMS V119
  - SMS V120
  - SMS V121
  - SMS B122
  - SMS B123
  - SMS B124
- G96 class (1915–16)
  - SMS G96
  - SMS V125
  - SMS V126
  - SMS V127
  - SMS V128
  - SMS V129
  - SMS V130
  - SMS V140
  - SMS V141
  - SMS V142
  - SMS V143
  - SMS V144
  - SMS S131
  - SMS S132
  - SMS S133
  - SMS S134
  - SMS S135
  - SMS S136
  - SMS S137
  - SMS S138
  - SMS S139
  - SMS H145
  - SMS H146
  - SMS H147
  - SMS G148
  - SMS G149
  - SMS G150
  - SMS WW151
  - SMS S152
  - SMS S153
  - SMS S154
  - SMS S155
  - SMS S156
  - SMS S157
  - SMS V158
  - SMS V159
  - SMS V160
  - SMS V161
  - SMS V162
  - SMS V163
  - SMS V164
  - SMS V165
  - SMS H166
  - SMS H167
  - SMS H168
  - SMS H169
- V170 class (1918)
  - SMS V170
  - SMS V171
  - SMS V172
  - SMS V173
  - SMS V174
  - SMS V175
  - SMS V176
  - SMS V177
  - SMS V203
  - SMS V204
  - SMS V205
  - SMS V206
  - SMS V207
  - SMS V208
  - SMS V209
  - SMS V210
  - SMS S178
  - SMS S179
  - SMS S180
  - SMS S181
  - SMS S182
  - SMS S183
  - SMS S184
  - SMS S185
  - SMS S211
  - SMS S212
  - SMS S213
  - SMS S214
  - SMS S215
  - SMS S216
  - SMS S217
  - SMS S218
  - SMS S219
  - SMS S220
  - SMS S221
  - SMS S222
  - SMS S223
  - SMS H186
  - SMS H187
  - SMS H188
  - SMS H189
  - SMS H190
  - SMS H191
  - SMS H192
  - SMS H193
  - SMS H194
  - SMS H195
  - SMS H196
  - SMS H197
  - SMS H198
  - SMS H199
  - SMS H200
  - SMS H201
  - SMS H202

== Survey Ships ==
- Planet class
  - SMS Planet
  - SMS Möwe

== Tankers ==
- SMS A

== See also ==
- List of naval ships of Germany
