= SMS Viper =

At least two ships of the Imperial German Navy or Austro-Hungarian Navy have been named SMS Viper:

- SMS Viper (1876), a German Wespe-class gunboat launched in 1876
- SMS Viper (1896), an Austro-Hungarian torpedo boat launched in 1896
