= SMS Salamander (1880) =

German ironclad gunboat

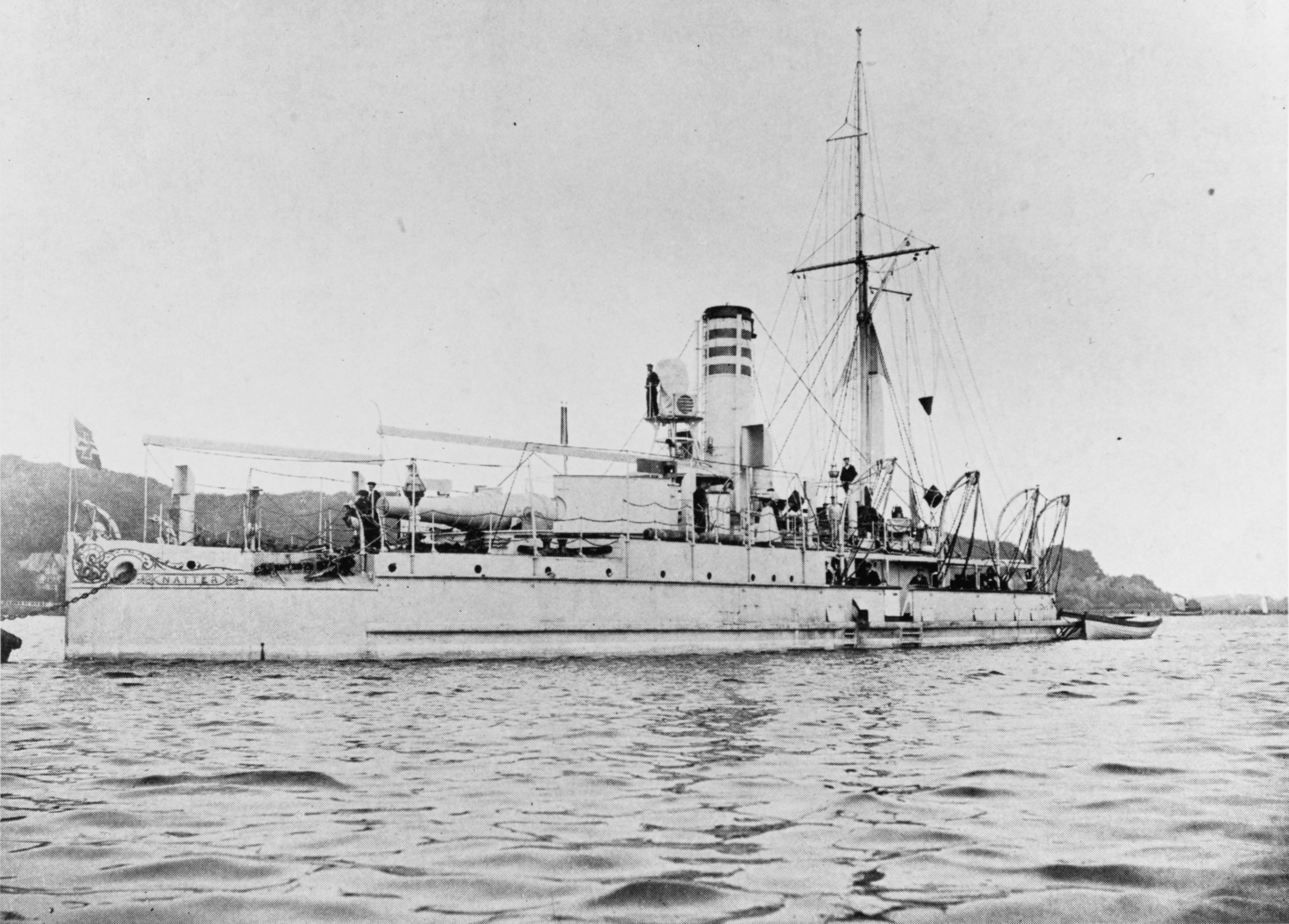
- Salamander's sister ship Natter in Kiel

History
- Name: Salamander
- Namesake: SMS Salamander
- Operator: Imperial German Navy
- Builder: AG Weser, Bremen
- Laid down: September 1878
- Launched: 6 January 1880
- Commissioned: 4 September 1883
- Decommissioned: 22 September 1891
- Stricken: 28 June 1909
- Fate: Accidentally sank, 1910

General characteristics
- Class & type: Wespe-class gunboat
- Displacement: Design: 1,098 t (1,081 long tons); Full load: 1,163 t (1,145 long tons)
- Length: 46.4 m (152 ft 3 in)
- Beam: 10.6 m (34 ft 9 in)
- Draft: 3.2 to 3.4 m (10 ft 6 in to 11 ft 2 in)
- Installed power: 4 × fire-tube boilers; 756 PS (746 ihp)
- Propulsion: 2 × double-expansion steam engines; 2 × screw propellers
- Speed: 11.1 knots (20.6 km/h; 12.8 mph)
- Range: 700 nmi (1,300 km; 810 mi) at 7 knots (13 km/h; 8.1 mph)
- Complement: 3 officers; 73–85 enlisted
- Armament: 1 × 30.5 cm (12 in) MRK L/22 gun
- Armor: Belt: 102 to 203 mm (4 to 8 in); Barbette: 203 mm (8 in); Deck: 44 mm (1.7 in)

SMS Salamander was an ironclad gunboat of the Wespe class built for the German Kaiserliche Marine (Imperial Navy) in the 1870s. The ships, which were armed with a single 30.5 cm (12 in) MRK L/22 gun, were intended to serve as part of a coastal defense fleet. Because Salamander was a purely defensive vessel, she saw little active use, apart from brief stints in active service for sea trials in 1883, followed by annual training exercises held from 1885 to 1891. She was struck from the naval register in 1909 and sold to ship breakers the next year. While en route to the breakers' yard in the Netherlands, she ran aground and could not be freed. The wreck was partially scrapped in situ, but the hull remains and was eventually buried in silt.

== Design ==
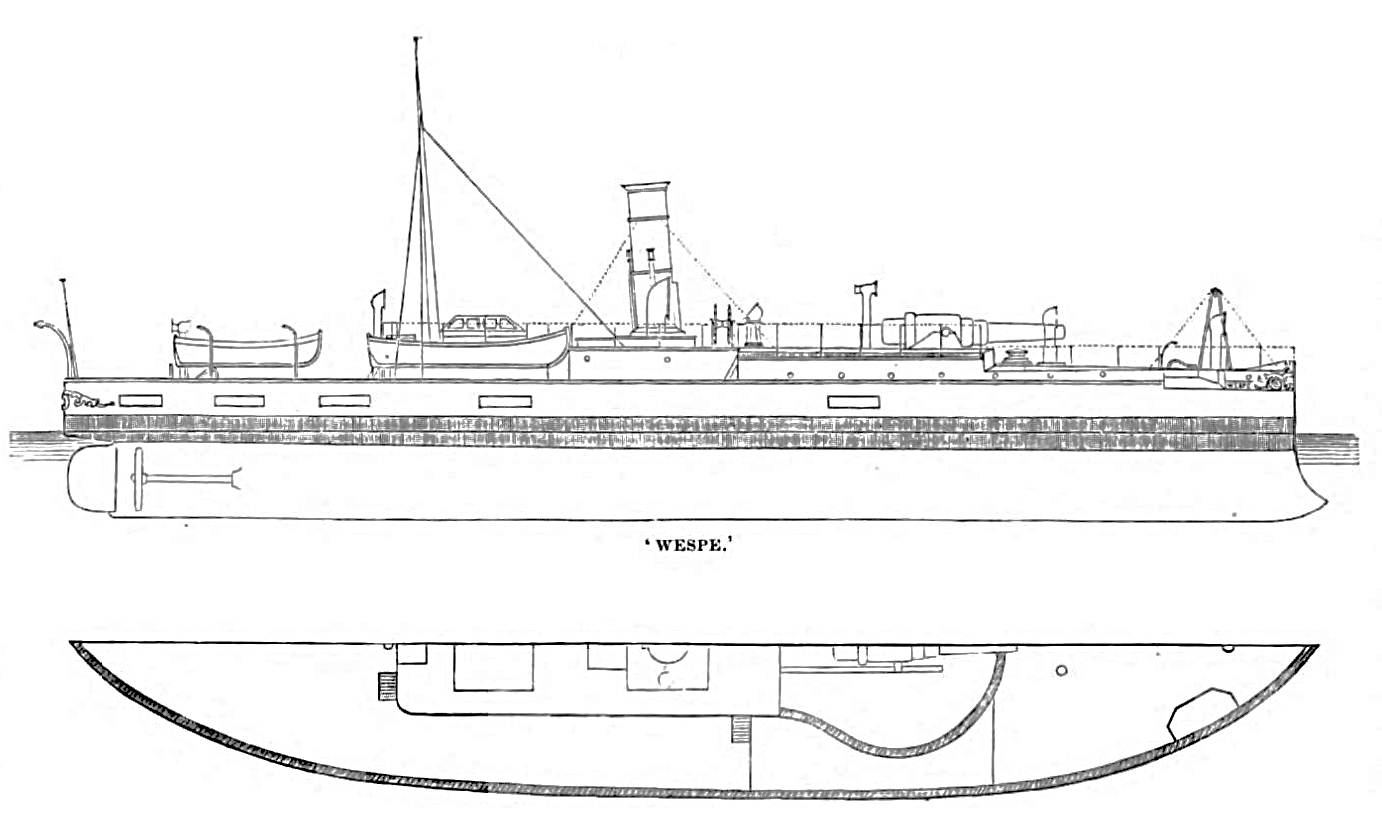
Plan and profile of the Wespe class in their original configuration

Development of the Wespe class of ironclad gunboats began in the 1850s, after the first ironclads were introduced during the Crimean War. Through the 1860s, the Federal Convention examined various proposals, ranging from plans to build eight to as many as eighteen armored warships. The decision was finalized based on the fleet plan conceived by General Albrecht von Stosch, the new Chief of the Kaiserliche Admiralität (Imperial Admiralty), in the early 1870s. He envisioned a fleet oriented on defense of Germany's Baltic and North Sea coasts, which would be led by the ironclad corvettes of the Sachsen class. These were to be supported by larger numbers of small, armored gunboats, which became the Wespe class.

Salamander was 46.4 meters (152 ft 3 in) long overall, with a beam of 10.6 m (34 ft 9 in). The ships of the Wespe class had a draft of 3.2 to 3.4 m (10 to 11 ft). She displaced 1,098 metric tons (1,081 long tons) as designed and increasing to 1,163 t (1,145 long tons) at full load. The ship's crew consisted of 3 officers and 73 to 85 enlisted men. She was powered by a pair of double-expansion steam engines that drove a pair of 4-bladed screw propellers, with steam provided by four coal-fired cylindrical fire-tube boilers, which gave her a top speed of 11.1 knots (20.6 km/h; 12.8 mph) at 756 metric horsepower (746 ihp). At a cruising speed of 7 knots (13 km/h; 8.1 mph), she could steam for 700 nautical miles (1,300 km; 810 mi).

The ship was armed with one 30.5 cm (12 in) MRK L/22 gun in a barbette mount that had a limited arc of traverse. In practice, the gun was aimed by turning the ship in the direction of fire. The Wespes were intended to beach themselves on the sandbars along the German coastline to serve as semi-mobile coastal artillery batteries. The armored barbette was protected by 203 mm (8 in) of wrought iron, backed with 210 mm (8.3 in) of teak. The ship was fitted with a waterline armor belt that was 102 to 203 mm (4 to 8 in) thick, with the thickest section protecting the propulsion machinery spaces and ammunition magazine. The belt was backed with 210 mm of teak. An armor deck that consisted of two layers of 22 mm (0.87 in) of iron on 28 mm (1.1 in) of teak provided additional protection against enemy fire.

== Service history ==
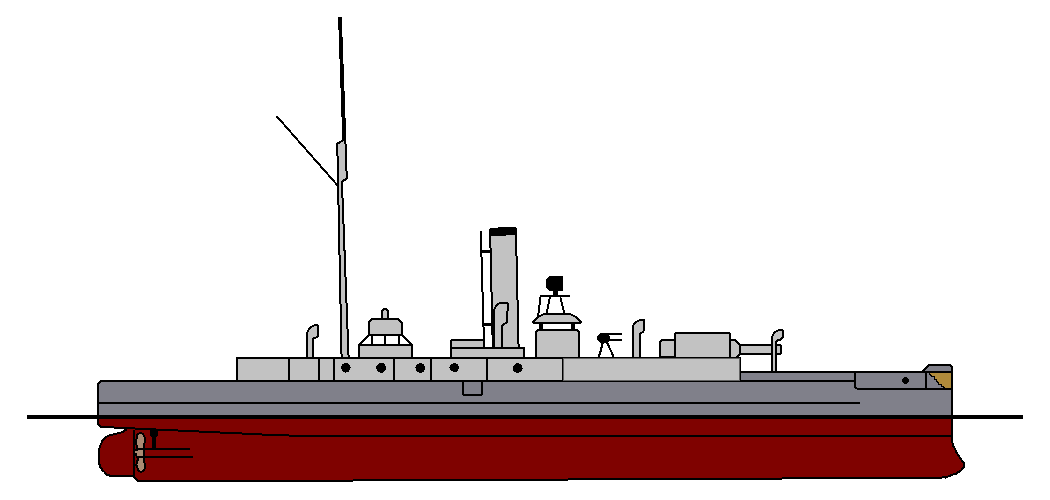
Profile drawing of the Wespe class as they appeared c. 1900

The keel for Salamander was laid down at the AG Weser shipyard in Bremen in September 1878, under the contract designation "J". (Note: German warships were ordered under provisional names. Additions to the fleet were given a single letter; ships intended to replace older or lost vessels were ordered as "Ersatz (name of the ship to be replaced)".) She was launched on 6 January 1880. The supervisor of the shipyard gave a speech at the launching ceremony, where the ship was named after the 1850s aviso Salamander. Work on the ship was completed later that year on 11 October, but she was not commissioned to begin sea trials until 4 September 1883. These tests only lasted for five days, after which she returned to the reserve fleet. By 1883, the ship had gone through a refit that included the installation of a pair of 8.7 cm (3.4 in) L/24 built-up guns, a pair of 37 mm (1.5 in) Hotchkiss revolver cannon, and two 35 cm (13.8 in) torpedo tubes in her bow, both of which were below the waterline.

The ship's first period in service began on 20 August 1885, when she was commissioned for training exercises conducted in company with her sisters Wespe, Viper, and Mücke. They were organized into a division for exercises with the rest of the German fleet, which lasted until 14 September. She was decommissioned again that day, and thereafter served as an auxiliary ship in the Reserve Division of the North Sea. She was recommissioned on 11 May 1886 for another brief period of training with some of her sisters, which lasted until 9 June. Salamander was next recommissioned on 16 August 1887, and she joined the Ironclad Squadron for training exercises that lasted until 14 September. That year, the gunboat division consisted of Salamander, Viper, Camaeleon, and Mücke, the latter serving as the divisional flagship. Salamander and the other gunboats performed poorly in the rough waters of the North Sea, and at times were unable to fire their main gun due to their poor seakeeping. These exercises demonstrated that the Wespe-class gunboats could not be used far from shore, and were of little use beyond local defensive operations.

The year 1888 followed the same pattern; the maneuvers that year lasted from 15 August to 15 September. The gunboat division again consisted of the same four vessels from 1887. The exercises included a simulated attack on the North Sea naval base at Wilhelmshaven, where Salamander served in the defending force. During this period of the maneuvers, the four gunboats were used to test the effectiveness of using them and a group of torpedo boats to support coastal fortifications outside the Jade, which produced a measure of success.

Salamander was recommissioned again on 13 August 1889, under the command of Kapitänleutnant (Captain Lieutenant) Friedrich Vüllers. Training maneuvers that year lasted until 11 September, after which the ship was again decommissioned, though the Reserve Division was disbanded at that time. The ship returned to active service from 13 August to 20 September 1890 for the annual fleet maneuvers. Her last period in active service began on 4 August 1891 and lasted until 22 September, when she was decommissioned for the last time. Salamander was struck from the naval register on 28 June 1909 and sold to a firm in Düsseldorf the following year. While under tow in November, she ran aground off Castricum, Netherlands, in a storm and could not be freed. The wreck remained there for decades, and her superstructure was eventually scrapped in situ in 1936. An attempt to raise the wreck in 1938 failed, as did one in 1980. The hull remained there and eventually became buried in silt.
