= SMS Wespe (1876) =

German ironclad gunboat

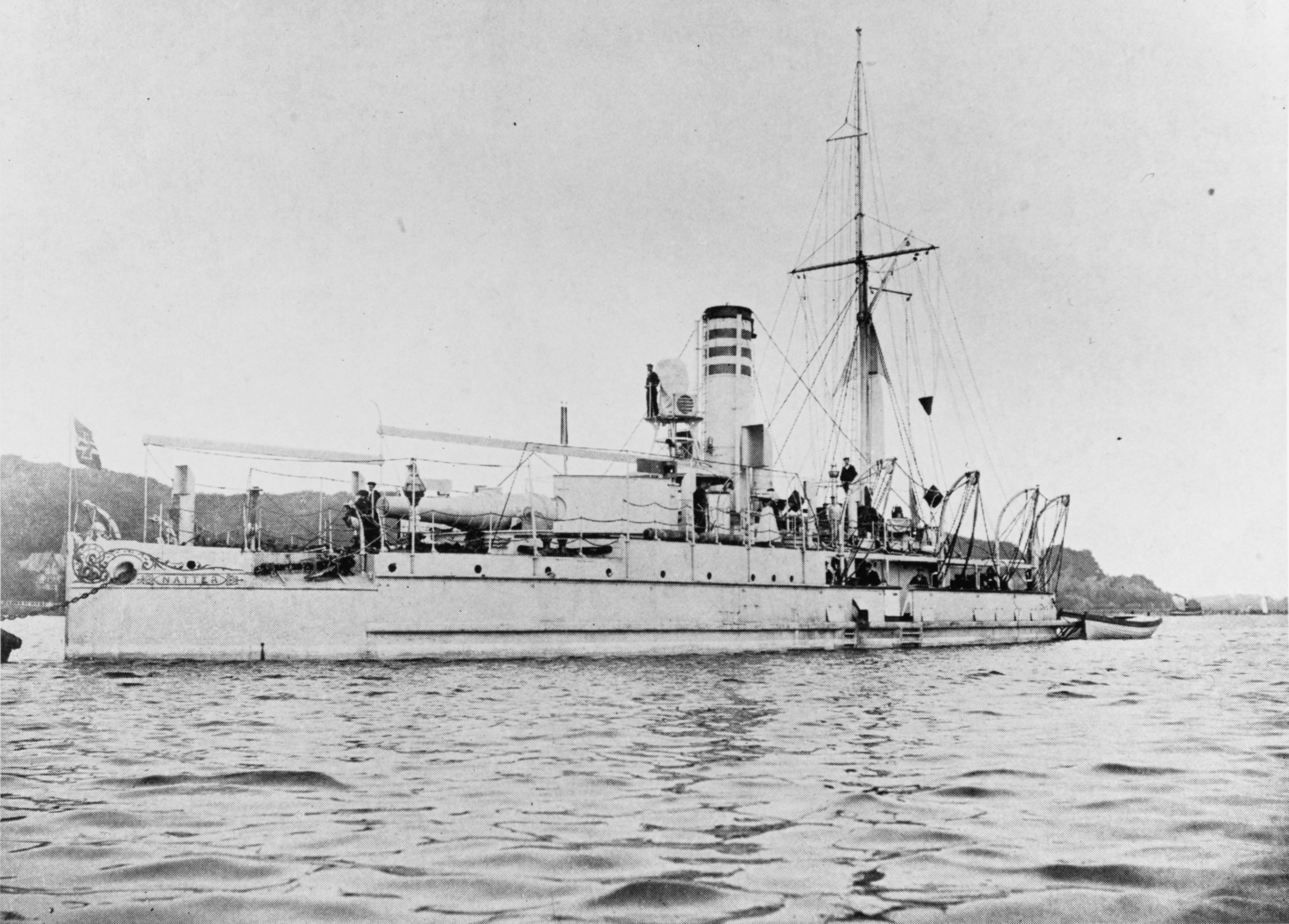
- Wespe's sister ship Natter in Kiel

History
- Name: Wespe
- Namesake: SMS Wespe
- Operator: Imperial German Navy
- Builder: AG Weser, Bremen
- Laid down: May 1875
- Launched: 6 July 1876
- Commissioned: 26 November 1876
- Decommissioned: 14 September 1885
- Stricken: 28 June 1909
- Fate: Sold, 1911

History
- Name: H.A.M. III
- Owner: Hollandsche Aanneming Maatschappij
- Acquired: 1911
- Fate: Sank in a storm, 11 May 1926

General characteristics
- Class & type: Wespe-class gunboat
- Displacement: Design: 1,098 t (1,081 long tons); Full load: 1,163 t (1,145 long tons)
- Length: 46.4 m (152 ft 3 in)
- Beam: 10.6 m (34 ft 9 in)
- Draft: 3.2 to 3.4 m (10 ft 6 in to 11 ft 2 in)
- Installed power: 4 × fire-tube boilers; 800 PS (790 ihp)
- Propulsion: 2 × double-expansion steam engines; 2 × screw propellers
- Speed: 10.4 knots (19.3 km/h; 12.0 mph)
- Range: 700 nmi (1,300 km; 810 mi) at 7 knots (13 km/h; 8.1 mph)
- Complement: 3 officers; 73–85 enlisted
- Armament: 1 × 30.5 cm (12 in) MRK L/22 gun
- Armor: Belt: 102 to 203 mm (4 to 8 in); Barbette: 203 mm (8 in); Deck: 44 mm (1.7 in)

SMS Wespe was the lead ship of the Wespe class of ironclad gunboats built for the German Kaiserliche Marine (Imperial Navy) in the 1870s. The ships, which were armed with a single 30.5 cm (12 in) MRK L/22 gun, were intended to serve as part of a coastal defense fleet. Wespe saw little active service after her initial sea trials in 1877, being commissioned for short training periods in 1880, 1881, and 1885. She was refitted twice during her career to strengthen her armament, in 1883 and 1892–1894. Wespe was struck from the naval register in 1909 and then used as a barge. In 1911, she was sold to the Dutch firm Hollandsche Aanneming Maatschappij and converted into a cutter suction dredger. While being towed from the Dutch East Indies to Australia in 1926, she sank in a storm off Newcastle, New South Wales; all three of her crew survived.

== Design ==
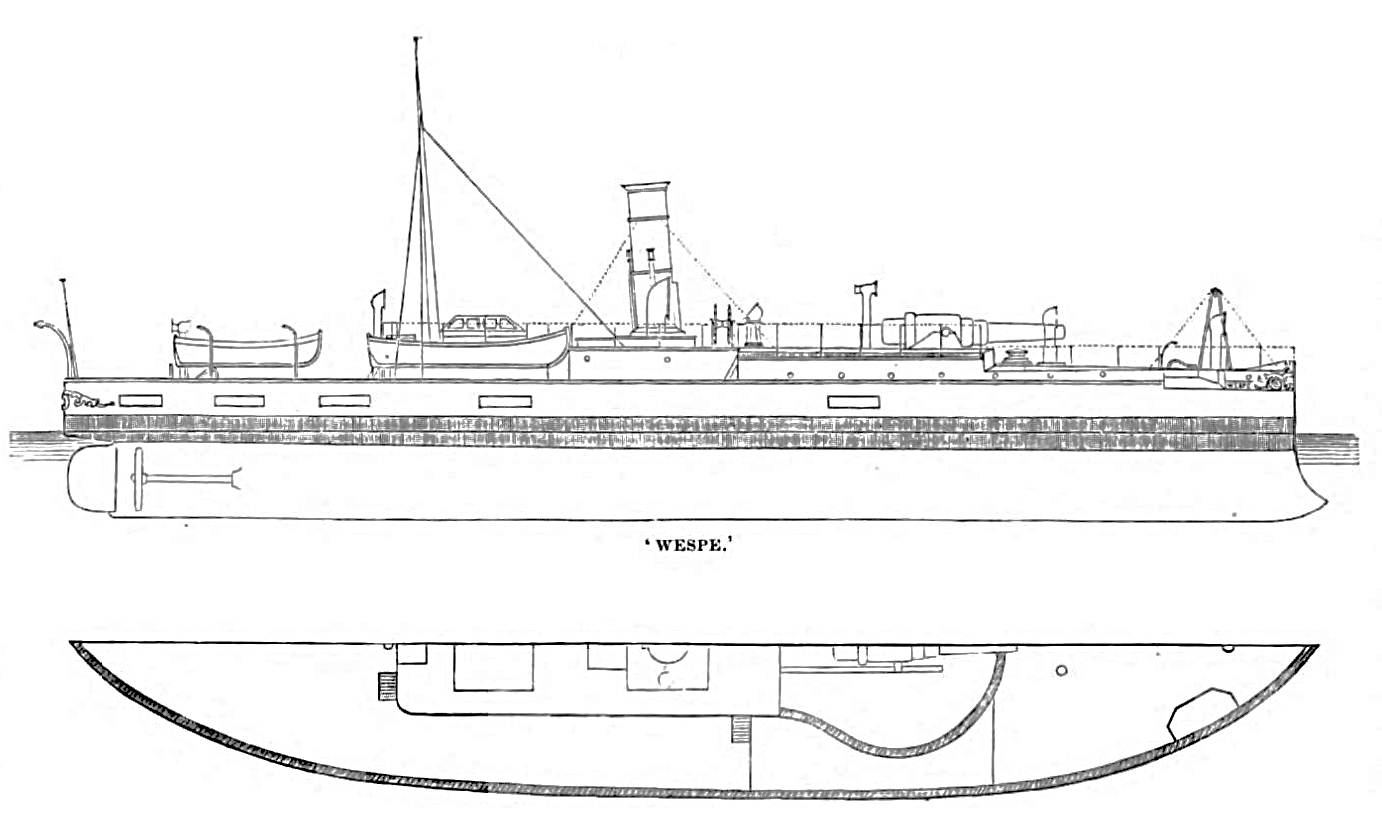
Plan and profile of Wespe in her original configuration

Development of the Wespe class of ironclad gunboats began in the 1850s, after the first ironclads were introduced during the Crimean War. Through the 1860s, the Federal Convention examined various proposals, ranging from plans to build eight to as many as eighteen armored warships. The decision was finalized based on the fleet plan conceived by General Albrecht von Stosch, the new Chief of the Kaiserliche Admiralität (Imperial Admiralty), in the early 1870s. He envisioned a fleet oriented on defense of Germany's Baltic and North Sea coasts, which would be led by the ironclad corvettes of the Sachsen class. These were to be supported by larger numbers of small, armored gunboats, which became the Wespe class.

Wespe was 46.4 meters (152 ft 3 in) long overall, with a beam of 10.6 m (34 ft 9 in). The ships of the Wespe class had a draft of 3.2 to 3.4 m (10 to 11 ft). She displaced 1,098 metric tons (1,081 long tons) as designed and increasing to 1,163 t (1,145 long tons) at full load. The ship's crew consisted of 3 officers and 73 to 85 enlisted men. She was powered by a pair of double-expansion steam engines that drove a pair of 4-bladed screw propellers, with steam provided by four coal-fired cylindrical fire-tube boilers, which gave her a top speed of 10.4 knots (19.3 km/h; 12.0 mph) at 800 metric horsepower (790 ihp). At a cruising speed of 7 knots (13 km/h; 8.1 mph), she could steam for 700 nautical miles (1,300 km; 810 mi).

The ship was armed with one 30.5 cm (12 in) MRK L/22 gun in a barbette mount that had a limited arc of traverse. In practice, the gun was aimed by turning the ship in the direction of fire. The Wespes were intended to beach themselves on the sandbars along the German coastline to serve as semi-mobile coastal artillery batteries. The armored barbette was protected by 203 mm (8 in) of wrought iron, backed with 210 mm (8.3 in) of teak. The ship was fitted with a waterline armor belt that was 102 to 203 mm (4 to 8 in) thick, with the thickest section protecting the propulsion machinery spaces and ammunition magazine. The belt was backed with 210 mm of teak. An armor deck that consisted of two layers of 22 mm (0.87 in) of iron on 28 mm (1.1 in) of teak provided additional protection against enemy fire.

== Service history ==
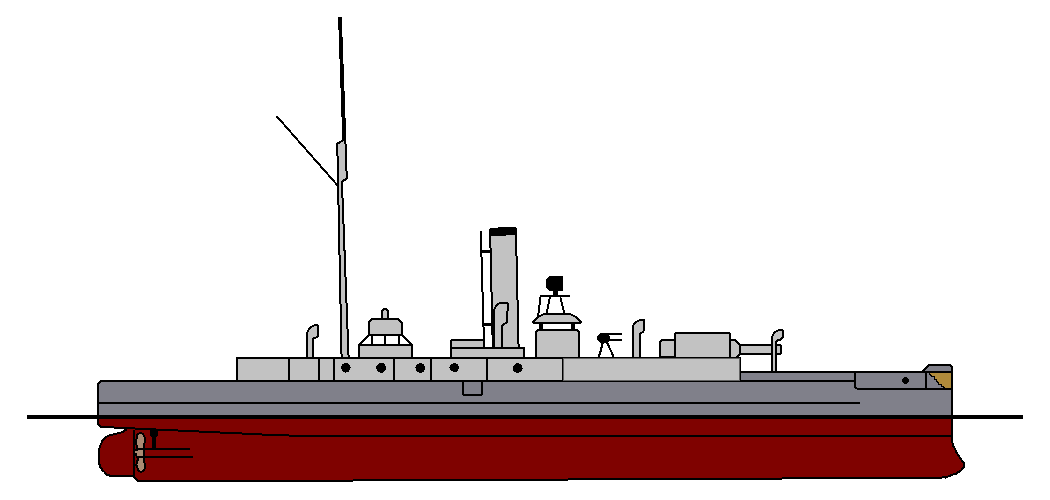
Profile drawing of Wespe as she appeared c. 1900

The keel for Wespe was laid down at the AG Weser shipyard in Bremen in May 1875 under the contract name "A", (Note: German warships were ordered under provisional names. Additions to the fleet were given a single letter; ships intended to replace older or lost vessels were ordered as "Ersatz (name of the ship to be replaced)".) and she was launched on 6 July 1876. The ship was named for the earlier wooden gunboat of the same name. Work on the ship was completed later that year, and she was moved to Wilhelmshaven to have her gun installed, along with other fitting-out work. The ship was commissioned into active service on 26 November. She then began initial sea trials, which lasted until 9 February 1877. Next, she conducted test firings of her gun in the Schillig roadstead from 24 March to 9 April. Wespe was thereafter laid up in reserve.

Wespe next recommissioned on 20 September 1880, under the command of Kapitänleutnant (Captain Lieutenant) Fritz Rötger. She conducted training operations with her sister ship Crocodill, before being decommissioned again on 15 October. The following year, she was recommissioned on 20 September to train cohorts of sailors to man her sisters that had been completed that year. The work lasted until 17 October, when she was decommissioned again for the winter. In 1882, the German government considered activating Wespe and some of her sisters to send them to an international naval demonstration to protest the Anglo-Egyptian War, but they were not activated for that purpose. By 1883, the ship had been refitted with two 35 cm (13.8 in) torpedo tubes in her bow, both of which were below the waterline.

Wespe remained out of service until 20 August 1885, when she was recommissioned for a brief period of training that lasted from 28 August to 14 September. Her sisters Salamander, Viper, and Mücke also participated, and the four ships operated in Jade Bight. Wespe was thereafter assigned to the Reserve Division of the North Sea. From 1892 to 1894, she was modernized with a new, armored conning tower and an additional two 8.7 cm (3.4 in) L/24 built-up guns and a pair of 37 mm (1.5 in) Hotchkiss revolver cannon. Despite the reconstruction, the ship never returned to active service, and she was eventually struck from the naval register on 28 June 1909. She was sold the following year in Düsseldorf, and was thereafter used as a barge. In 1911, Wespe was converted into a cutter suction dredger and sold into commercial service with the Hollandsche Aanneming Maatschappij, where she was renamed H.A.M. III.

At some point thereafter, H.A.M. III was sent to the Dutch East Indies. On 27 March 1926, she was taken under tow by the tugboat Kraus, departing from Surabaya, Java, to sail to Australia. On the morning of 11 May, while about 50 nmi (93 km; 58 mi) from Newcastle, New South Wales, H.A.M. III sprang a leak in heavy weather. The ship's pumps, coupled with hand pumps, could not keep pace with the flooding, and after forty-five minutes, the three-man crew abandoned the sinking vessel as Kraus cut the tow line. The suction from the sinking ship dragged the captain down about 12 m (40 ft), but he was able to swim back to the surface. Kraus rescued all three men and arrived in Newcastle two days later. H.A.M. III lies at a depth of 56 fathoms (336 ft; 102 m) off Sugar Loaf Point.
