= SMS Mücke =

German ironclad gunboat

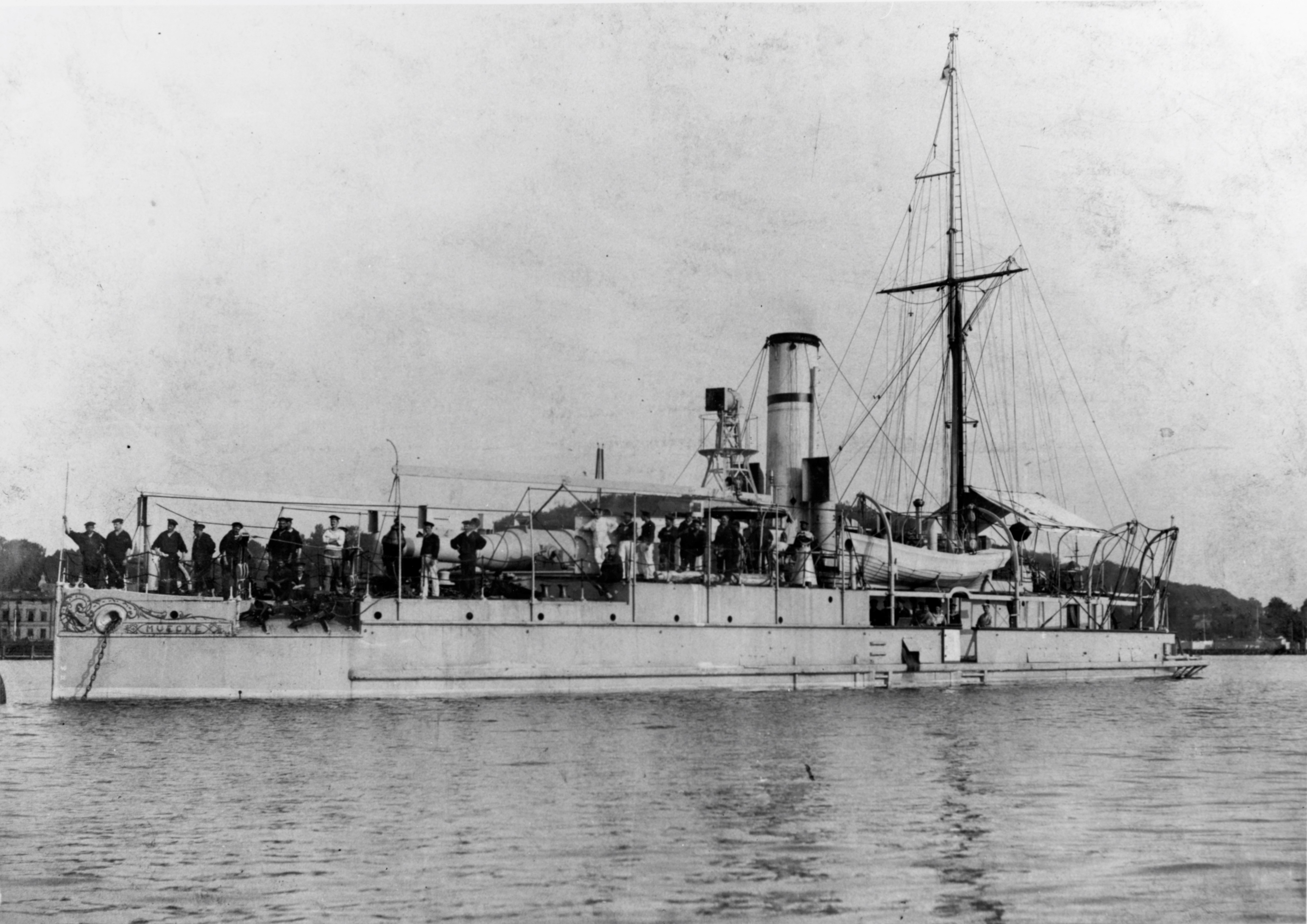
- Mücke sometime in the 1880s to 1897

History
- Name: Mücke
- Namesake: Mosquito
- Operator: Imperial German Navy
- Builder: AG Weser, Bremen
- Laid down: 1876
- Launched: 5 May 1877
- Commissioned: 25 February 1878
- Decommissioned: 24 September 1900
- Stricken: 18 March 1911
- Fate: Broken up, 1921

General characteristics
- Class & type: Wespe-class gunboat
- Displacement: Design: 1,098 t (1,081 long tons); Full load: 1,163 t (1,145 long tons)
- Length: 46.4 m (152 ft 3 in)
- Beam: 10.6 m (34 ft 9 in)
- Draft: 3.2 to 3.4 m (10 ft 6 in to 11 ft 2 in)
- Installed power: 4 × fire-tube boilers; 711 PS (701 ihp)
- Propulsion: 2 × double-expansion steam engines; 2 × screw propellers
- Speed: 11 knots (20 km/h; 13 mph)
- Range: 700 nmi (1,300 km; 810 mi) at 7 knots (13 km/h; 8.1 mph)
- Complement: 3 officers; 73–85 enlisted
- Armament: 1 × 30.5 cm (12 in) MRK L/22 gun
- Armor: Belt: 102 to 203 mm (4 to 8 in); Barbette: 203 mm (8 in); Deck: 44 mm (1.7 in)

SMS Mücke was an ironclad gunboat of the Wespe class built for the German Kaiserliche Marine (Imperial Navy) in the 1870s. The ships, which were armed with a single 30.5 cm (12 in) MRK L/22 gun, were intended to serve as part of a coastal defense fleet. Mücke saw significant service from the mid-1880s to early 1890s during training maneuvers with the rest of the German fleet, frequently serving as a flagship of a gunboat flotilla. After a refit in 1894, the ship spent much of the rest of the decade in reserve, being reactivated for short training periods. In 1911, she was reduced to a training ship, and she was eventually sold to ship breakers in 1921.

== Design ==
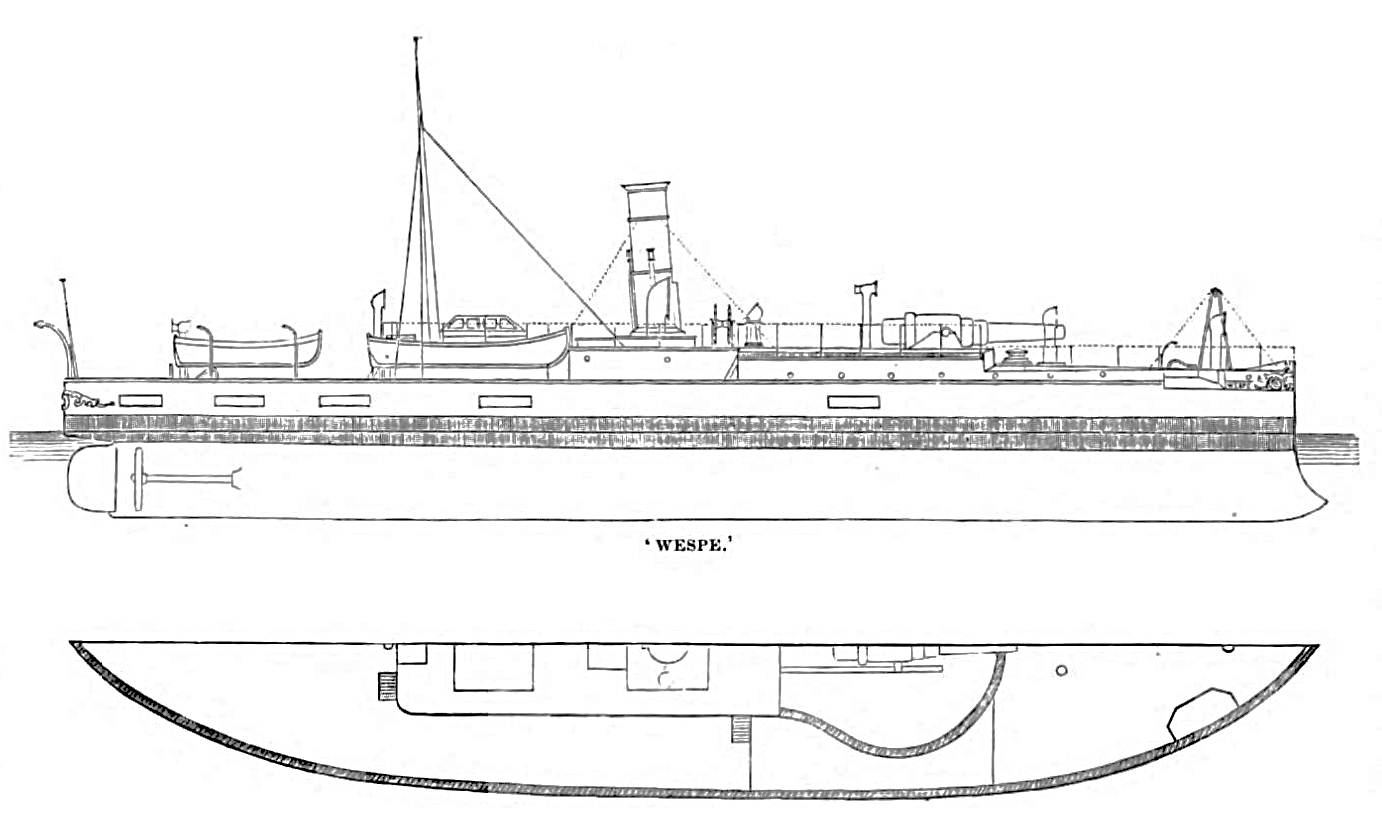
Plan and profile of the Wespe class in their original configuration

Development of the Wespe class of ironclad gunboats began in the 1850s, after the first ironclads were introduced during the Crimean War. Through the 1860s, the Federal Convention examined various proposals, ranging from plans to build eight to as many as eighteen armored warships. The decision was finalized based on the fleet plan conceived by General Albrecht von Stosch, the new Chief of the Kaiserliche Admiralität (Imperial Admiralty), in the early 1870s. He envisioned a fleet oriented on defense of Germany's Baltic and North Sea coasts, which would be led by the ironclad corvettes of the Sachsen class. These were to be supported by larger numbers of small, armored gunboats, which became the Wespe class.

Mücke was 46.4 meters (152 ft 3 in) long overall, with a beam of 10.6 m (34 ft 9 in). The ships of the Wespe class had a draft of 3.2 to 3.4 m (10 to 11 ft). She displaced 1,098 metric tons (1,081 long tons) as designed and increasing to 1,163 t (1,145 long tons) at full load. The ship's crew consisted of 3 officers and 73 to 85 enlisted men. She was powered by a pair of double-expansion steam engines that drove a pair of 4-bladed screw propellers, with steam provided by four coal-fired cylindrical fire-tube boilers, which gave her a top speed of 11 knots (20 km/h; 13 mph) at 711 metric horsepower (701 ihp). At a cruising speed of 7 knots (13 km/h; 8.1 mph), she could steam for 700 nautical miles (1,300 km; 810 mi).

The ship was armed with one 30.5 cm (12 in) MRK L/22 gun in a barbette mount that had a limited arc of traverse. In practice, the gun was aimed by turning the ship in the direction of fire. The Wespes were intended to beach themselves on the sandbars along the German coastline to serve as semi-mobile coastal artillery batteries. The armored barbette was protected by 203 mm (8 in) of wrought iron, backed with 210 mm (8.3 in) of teak. The ship was fitted with a waterline armor belt that was 102 to 203 mm (4 to 8 in) thick, with the thickest section protecting the propulsion machinery spaces and ammunition magazine. The belt was backed with 210 mm of teak. An armor deck that consisted of two layers of 22 mm (0.87 in) of iron on 28 mm (1.1 in) of teak provided additional protection against enemy fire.

== Service history ==
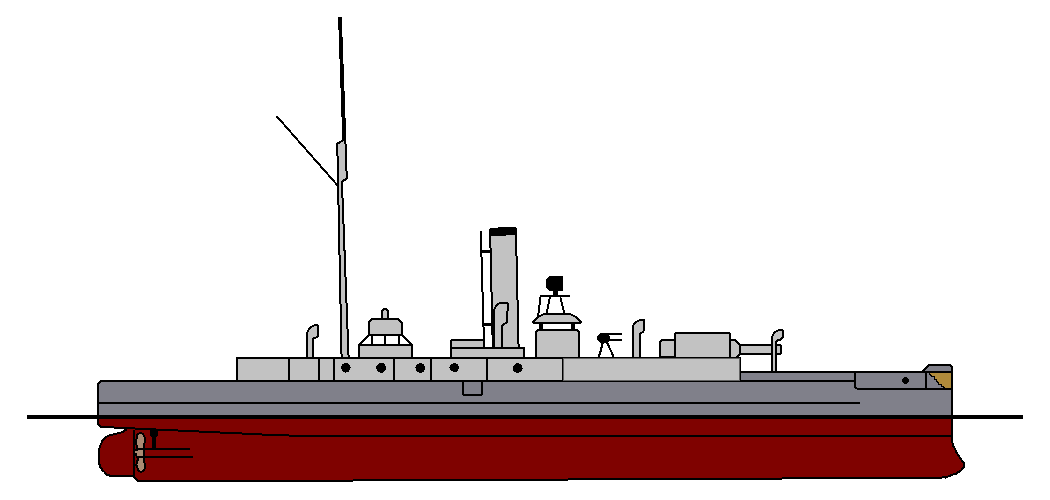
Profile drawing of the Wespe class as they appeared c. 1900

The keel for Mücke was laid down at the AG Weser shipyard in Bremen in 1876 under the contract designation "D", (Note: German warships were ordered under provisional names. Additions to the fleet were given a single letter; ships intended to replace older or lost vessels were ordered as "Ersatz (name of the ship to be replaced)".) and she was launched on 5 May 1877. She was named after the German word for mosquito. Work on the ship proceeded more slowly than her sister ships, and she was briefly commissioned into active service on 25 February 1878 for sea trials. She saw no further activity for the next eight years, during which she was refitted with an additional pair of 8.7 cm (3.4 in) L/24 built-up guns, a pair of 37 mm (1.5 in) Hotchkiss revolver cannon, and two 35 cm (13.8 in) torpedo tubes in her bow, both of which were below the waterline. Despite her lengthy period of inactivity early in her career, Mücke would be the most active member of her class.

Mücke commissioned for her first period of service with the fleet on 1 May 1885. She initially conducted individual training exercises, beginning in mid-June. For the fall fleet maneuvers, she served as the flagship of a division of gunboats that included her sisters Viper, Wespe, and Salamander. The ships took part in combined fleet training maneuvers, which saw the gunboats defend the mouth of Jade Bight against a simulated attack by the main units of the German fleet. Following the end of the maneuvers on 7 September, Mücke was assigned to the Reserve Division of the North Sea, serving as its flagship. At that time, Kapitänleutnant (Captain Lieutenant) Richard Hornung served as the ship's commander.

For the 1886 training year, an Armored Gunboat Flotilla was created on 11 May; Mücke again served as the flagship, alongside Viper, Salamander, and their sister Camaeleon. The ships conducted training exercises until 9 June, when the unit was disbanded. Mücke thereafter served in the Training Fleet for the annual maneuvers, which were carried out in July and August. The ship trained individually from May to early August 1887, after which she joined the Training Fleet as in previous years. Once again, Mücke reprised her role as flagship for the armored gunboat division, at that time flying the flag of Kapitän zur See Otto von Diederichs. The division retained the same four ships as the previous year. The fleet maneuvers, which were the largest such exercises yet held by the German fleet, lasted from 3 to 14 September. They consisted of another simulated attack on Jade Bight, along with blockade operations in the area. Mücke and the other gunboats performed poorly in the rough waters of the North Sea, and at times were unable to fire their main gun due to their poor seakeeping. Mücke thereafter returned to the Reserve Division for the winter months.

In April 1888, now-Korvettenkapitän (KK—Corvette Captain) Hornung was replaced by KK Alfred Herz. The ship's activities that year mirrored that of previous years, with the exception that the annual fleet maneuvers were held in the mouth of the Weser river. Diederichs returned to Mücke, which once again served as his flagship; the division composition remained unchanged from the previous year. The four gunboats were used to test the effectiveness of using them and a group of torpedo boats to support coastal fortifications, which produced a measure of success. In January 1889, KK Oscar von Schuckmann took command of the ship. That year's training program followed a similar pattern, as did 1890's. In October 1890, KK August Gruner relieved Schuckmann. Leutnant zur See (Lieutenant at Sea) Max Wilken briefly captained the ship in August and September 1891.

Mücke was decommissioned on 24 September, the first time she left active service since 1885. She was then taken to the Kaiserliche Werft in Wilhelmshaven for a refit and modernization that included the installation of an armored conning tower. The ship returned to active service on 23 April 1895; she sailed from Wilhelmshaven on 29 April, bound for the Baltic Sea, passing through Frederikshavn and Rixhöft on the way to Danzig. There, she replaced her sister Crocodill as the flagship of the Armored Gunboat Reserve Division that was stationed there. The unit also included Crocodill, Natter, and Scorpion, but during this period, only Mücke and Natter were kept in commission. The two ships trained together that year and in 1896, primarily in the Baltic, but also occasionally in the North Sea. In September 1896, KK Adolf Paschen became the captain of Mücke.

Mücke was assigned to the Reserve Division on 3 August 1897, serving as its flagship. As part of that unit, she participated in the fleet maneuvers from mid-August into September. These included another simulated attack on the Jade, in which Mücke reprised her role in the defending squadron. The following year, Mücke and Natter joined the Maneuver Fleet for another mock attack, this time on Wilhelmshaven directly. Mücke was then decommissioned on 1 October in Danzig. Following the deployment of the four Brandenburg-class battleships to China in response to the Boxer Uprising in 1900, Mücke was reactivated due to the shortage of warships in home waters. She remained in commission only until 24 September, however, and she saw no further active service. After more than a decade in reserve, during which time she was used in hull leakage experiments, she was struck from the naval register on 18 March 1911. She was then used as a training ship for boiler room crews, a role she filled through the end of World War I in 1918. She was sold on 25 June 1921 to ship breakers and was scrapped later that year in Wewelsfleth.
