= SMS Camaeleon =

German ironclad gunboat

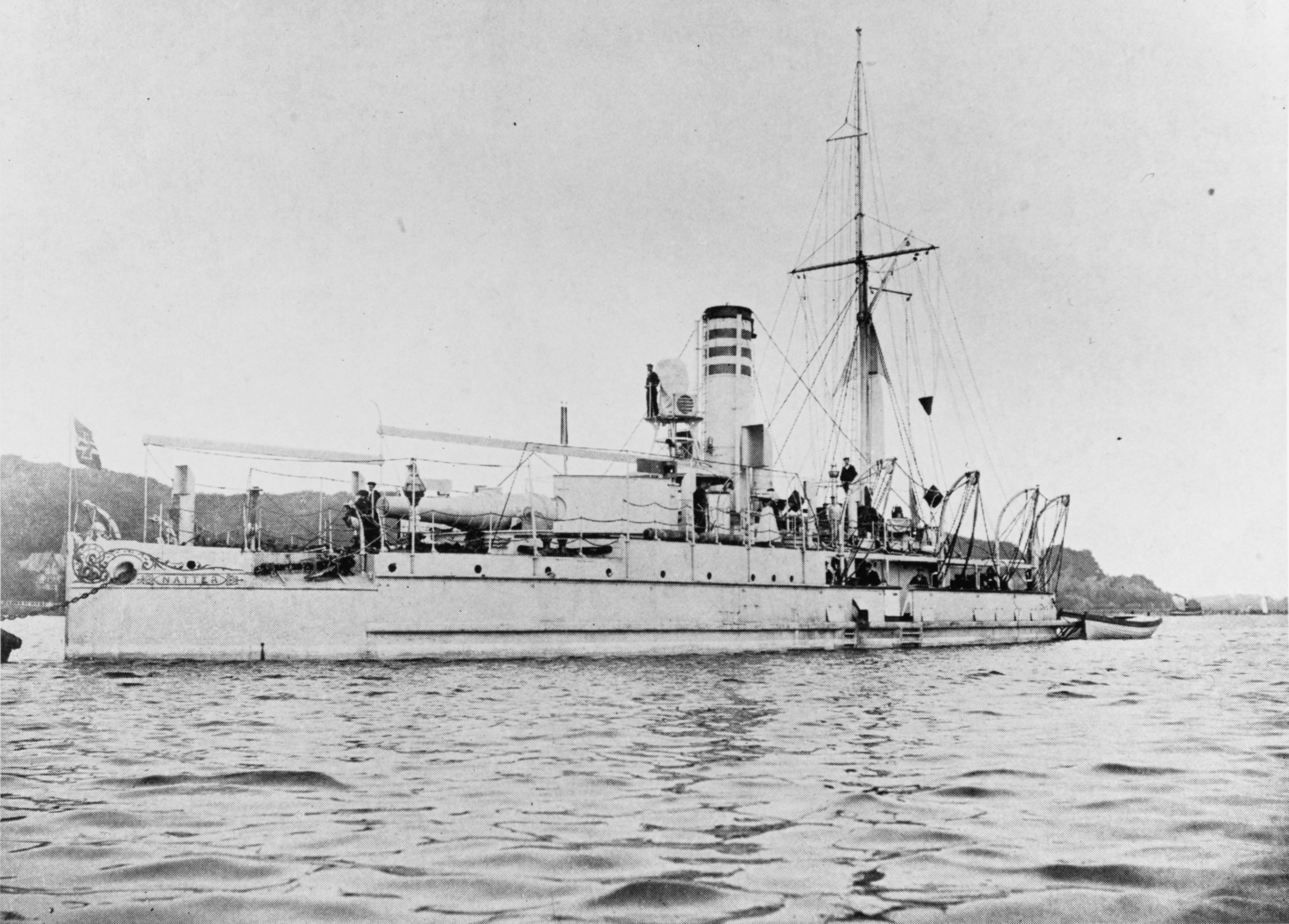
- Camaeleon's sister ship Natter in Kiel

History
- Name: Camaeleon
- Namesake: SMS Camäleon
- Operator: Imperial German Navy
- Builder: AG Weser, Bremen
- Laid down: 1878
- Launched: 21 December 1878
- Commissioned: 10 November 1879
- Decommissioned: 22 September 1891
- Stricken: 28 June 1909
- Fate: Converted to a barge

General characteristics
- Class & type: Wespe-class gunboat
- Displacement: Design: 1,098 t (1,081 long tons); Full load: 1,163 t (1,145 long tons)
- Length: 46.4 m (152 ft 3 in)
- Beam: 10.6 m (34 ft 9 in)
- Draft: 3.2 to 3.4 m (10 ft 6 in to 11 ft 2 in)
- Installed power: 4 × fire-tube boilers; 786 PS (775 ihp)
- Propulsion: 2 × double-expansion steam engines; 2 × screw propellers
- Speed: 11.2 knots (20.7 km/h; 12.9 mph)
- Range: 700 nmi (1,300 km; 810 mi) at 7 knots (13 km/h; 8.1 mph)
- Complement: 3 officers; 73–85 enlisted
- Armament: 1 × 30.5 cm (12 in) MRK L/22 gun
- Armor: Belt: 102 to 203 mm (4 to 8 in); Barbette: 203 mm (8 in); Deck: 44 mm (1.7 in)

SMS Camaeleon was an ironclad gunboat of the Wespe class built for the German Kaiserliche Marine (Imperial Navy) in the 1870s. The ships, which were armed with a single 30.5 cm (12 in) MRK L/22 gun, were intended to serve as part of a coastal defense fleet. Because Camaeleon was a purely defensive vessel, she saw little active use, apart from brief stints in active service for sea trials in 1880, followed by short training periods in through the 1880s and into the early 1890s. She spent the rest of her career in the reserve fleet, first in the Baltic Sea and then in the North Sea. Camaeleon was eventually struck from the naval register in 1909 and sold for use as a storage hulk the following year, though her ultimate fate is unknown.

== Design ==
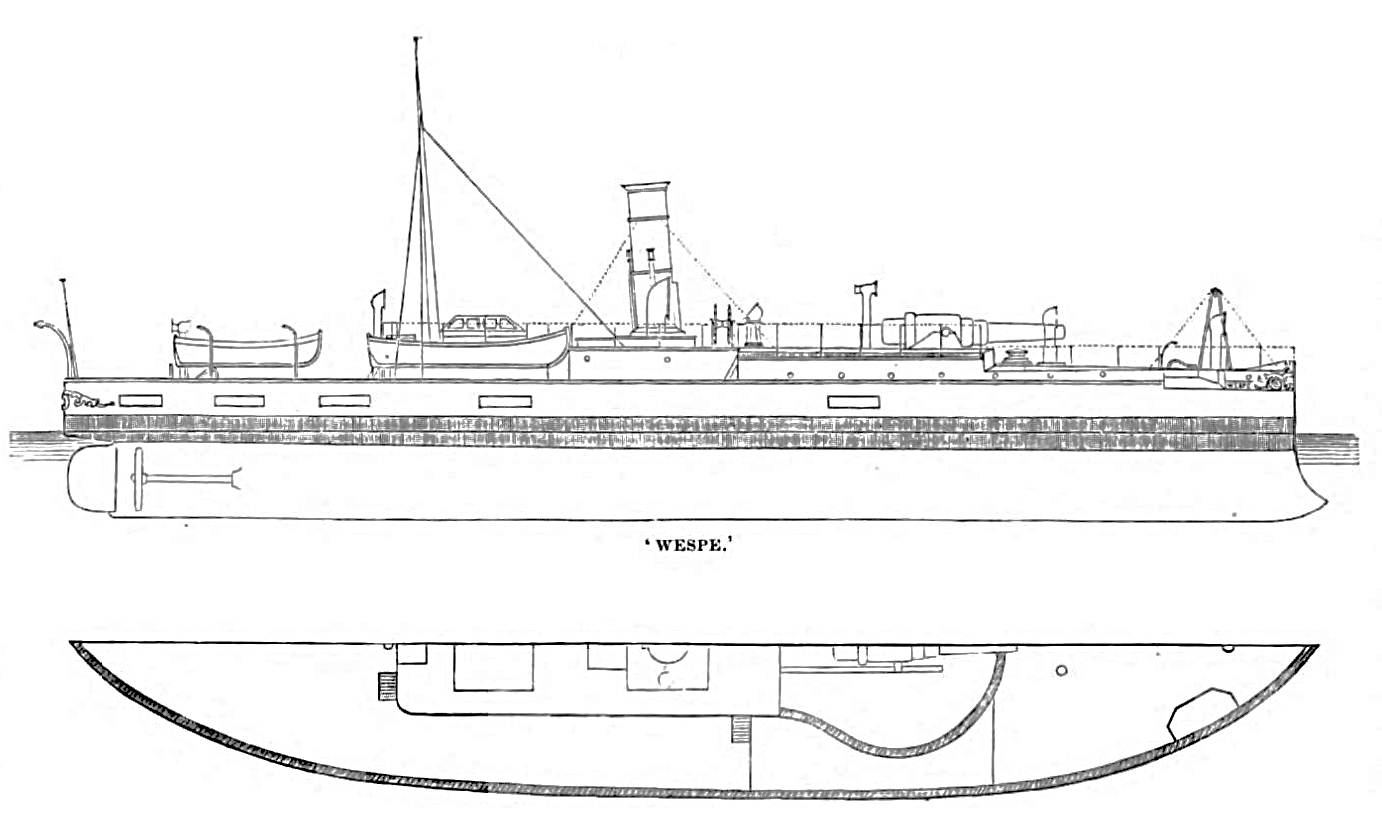
Plan and profile of the Wespe class in their original configuration

Development of the Wespe class of ironclad gunboats began in the 1850s, after the first ironclads were introduced during the Crimean War. Through the 1860s, the Federal Convention examined various proposals, ranging from plans to build eight to as many as eighteen armored warships. The decision was finalized based on the fleet plan conceived by General Albrecht von Stosch, the new Chief of the Kaiserliche Admiralität (Imperial Admiralty), in the early 1870s. He envisioned a fleet oriented on defense of Germany's Baltic and North Sea coasts, which would be led by the ironclad corvettes of the Sachsen class. These were to be supported by larger numbers of small, armored gunboats, which became the Wespe class.

Camaeleon was 46.4 meters (152 ft 3 in) long overall, with a beam of 10.6 m (34 ft 9 in). The ships of the Wespe class had a draft of 3.2 to 3.4 m (10 to 11 ft). She displaced 1,098 metric tons (1,081 long tons) as designed and increasing to 1,163 t (1,145 long tons) at full load. The ship's crew consisted of 3 officers and 73 to 85 enlisted men. She was powered by a pair of double-expansion steam engines that drove a pair of 4-bladed screw propellers, with steam provided by four coal-fired cylindrical fire-tube boilers, which gave her a top speed of 11.2 knots (20.7 km/h; 12.9 mph) at 786 metric horsepower (775 ihp). At a cruising speed of 7 knots (13 km/h; 8.1 mph), she could steam for 700 nautical miles (1,300 km; 810 mi).

The ship was armed with one 30.5 cm (12 in) MRK L/22 gun in a barbette mount that had a limited arc of traverse. In practice, the gun was aimed by turning the ship in the direction of fire. The Wespes were intended to beach themselves on the sandbars along the German coastline to serve as semi-mobile coastal artillery batteries. The armored barbette was protected by 203 mm (8 in) of wrought iron, backed with 210 mm (8.3 in) of teak. The ship was fitted with a waterline armor belt that was 102 to 203 mm (4 to 8 in) thick, with the thickest section protecting the propulsion machinery spaces and ammunition magazine. The belt was backed with 210 mm of teak. An armor deck that consisted of two layers of 22 mm (0.87 in) of iron on 28 mm (1.1 in) of teak provided additional protection against enemy fire.

== Service history ==
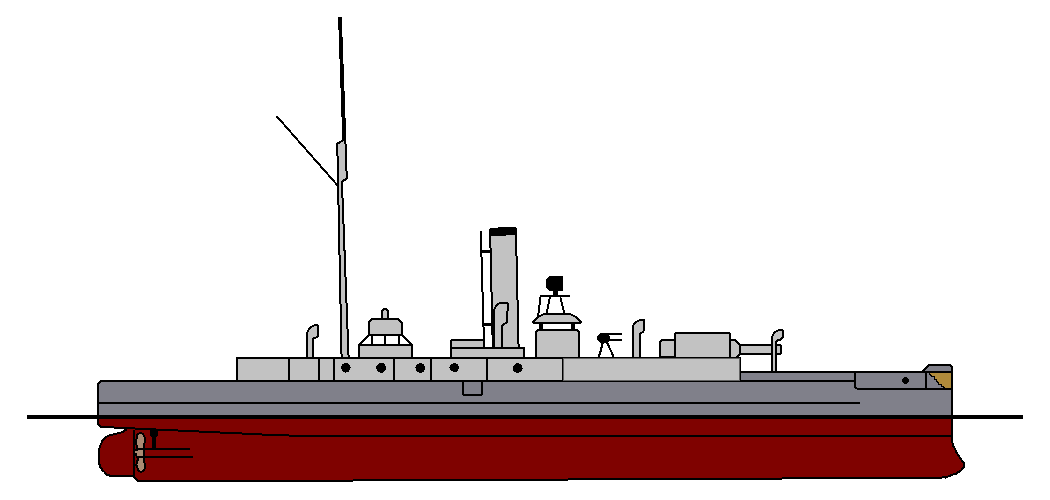
Profile drawing of the Wespe class as they appeared c. 1900

Camaeleon was laid down at the AG Weser shipyard in Bremen in 1878 under the contract designation "G", (Note: German warships were ordered under provisional names. Additions to the fleet were given a single letter; ships intended to replace older or lost vessels were ordered as "Ersatz (name of the ship to be replaced)".) and she was launched on 21 December that year. Alexander Georg Mosle, the director of the shipyard and also a member of the Reichstag (Imperial Diet), gave a speech during the launching ceremony. The ship was named after the earlier steam gunboat Camäleon, built in the early 1860s. Work on the ship was completed the following year, and she was commissioned on 10 November 1879. She remained out of active service, however, and was first activated on 20 August 1880 for sea trials in company with her sister ship Basilisk. After trials were completed, the navy decided to station Camaeleon in the Baltic Sea, and so on 8 September, she left to sail around Denmark. While on the way, she encountered severe storms that forced her to shelter in Kalundborg, Denmark. After arriving in Kiel, she was decommissioned at the Kaiserliche Werft (Imperial Shipyard) there and placed in reserve.

The ship next returned to service on 19 September 1881 for training exercises. These were concluded by 15 October, when Camaeleon was decommissioned again. By 1883, the ship had been refitted with an additional pair of 8.7 cm (3.4 in) L/24 built-up guns, a pair of 37 mm (1.5 in) Hotchkiss revolver cannon, and two 35 cm (13.8 in) torpedo tubes in her bow, both of which were below the waterline. The ship next commissioned on 22 April 1884 for training exercises with the newly created Armored Gunboat Flotilla, which was led by the aviso Grille. After the end of exercises in late August, Camaeleon steamed to Wilhelmshaven for periodic maintenance. She was decommissioned there on 4 September for the work, and she was assigned to the Marinestation der Nordsee (North Sea Naval Station) at that time.

Camaeleon was recommissioned again on 11 May 1886 for another stint in the Armored Gunboat Flotilla, which was led that year by her sister Mücke. The unit also participated in the main fleet maneuvers that year, and Camaeleon was decommissioned again on 9 June. The ship's next period of active service lasted from 16 August to 14 September 1887, and again, Camaeleon took part in the fleet maneuvers. That year, the gunboat division consisted of Camaeleon, Salamander, Viper, and Mücke, the latter serving as the divisional flagship. Camaeleon and the other gunboats performed poorly in the rough waters of the North Sea, and at times were unable to fire their main gun due to their poor seakeeping. These exercises demonstrated that the Wespe-class gunboats could not be used far from shore, and were of little use beyond local defensive operations.

The year 1888 passed similarly, with the only period of active training beginning on 15 August and concluding on 15 September. The gunboat division again consisted of the same four vessels from 1887. The four gunboats were used to test the effectiveness of using them and a group of torpedo boats to support coastal fortifications, which produced a measure of success. On 1 October, she became the auxiliary ship for the II Reserve Division of the North Sea. She filled that role for the next three years, which saw active periods beginning from 13 August to 11 September 1889, The next lasted from 13 August to 20 September 1890, and the last was from 4 August to 22 September 1891. During this last period, the ship was commanded by Kapitänleutnant (Captain Lieutenant) Hans Meyer. Camaeleon saw no further active service, and she remained in the reserve fleet for most of the next two decades. On 28 June 1909, Camaeleon was struck from the naval register. She was sold the following year to a firm in Düsseldorf that used the hull as a storage barge. Her ultimate fate is unknown.
