= SMS Viper (1876) =

German ironclad gunboat

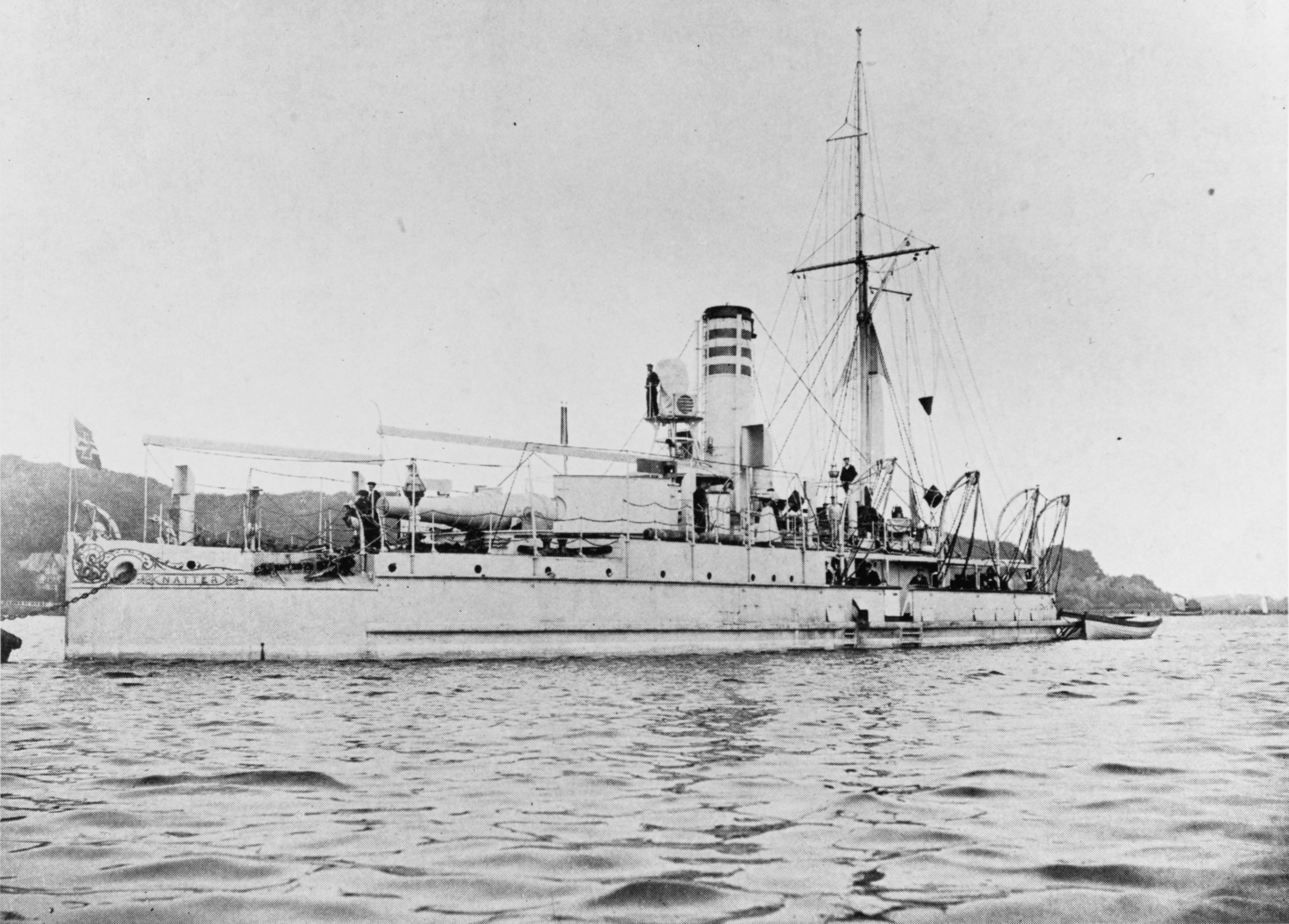
- Viper's sister ship Natter in Kiel

History
- Name: Viper
- Namesake: Viper
- Operator: Imperial German Navy; Reichsmarine; Kriegsmarine
- Builder: AG Weser, Bremen
- Laid down: May 1875
- Launched: 21 September 1876
- Commissioned: 27 March 1877
- Decommissioned: 22 September 1891
- Stricken: 28 June 1909
- Notes: Converted to crane ship, 1910

General characteristics
- Class & type: Wespe-class gunboat
- Displacement: Design: 1,098 t (1,081 long tons); Full load: 1,163 t (1,145 long tons)
- Length: 46.4 m (152 ft 3 in)
- Beam: 10.6 m (34 ft 9 in)
- Draft: 3.2 to 3.4 m (10 ft 6 in to 11 ft 2 in)
- Installed power: 4 × fire-tube boilers; 800 PS (790 ihp)
- Propulsion: 2 × double-expansion steam engines; 2 × screw propellers
- Speed: 10.4 knots (19.3 km/h; 12.0 mph)
- Range: 700 nmi (1,300 km; 810 mi) at 7 knots (13 km/h; 8.1 mph)
- Complement: 3 officers; 73–85 enlisted
- Armament: 1 × 30.5 cm (12 in) MRK L/22 gun
- Armor: Belt: 102 to 203 mm (4 to 8 in); Barbette: 203 mm (8 in); Deck: 44 mm (1.7 in)

SMS Viper was an ironclad gunboat of the Wespe class built for the German Kaiserliche Marine (Imperial Navy) in the 1870s. The ships, which were armed with a single 30.5 cm (12 in) MRK L/22 gun, were intended to serve as part of a coastal defense fleet. Viper saw little active service after her initial sea trials in 1877, being commissioned for short training periods every year between 1885 and 1891. The ship remained in reserve until 1909, when she was converted into a crane ship. During World War I in 1918, she assisted in the recovery of the battleship SMS Rheinland. She was still in service during World War II, and was slated to participate in Operation Sea Lion, the planned invasion of Britain. Viper remained operational until as late as 1970, but her ultimate fate is unknown.

== Design ==
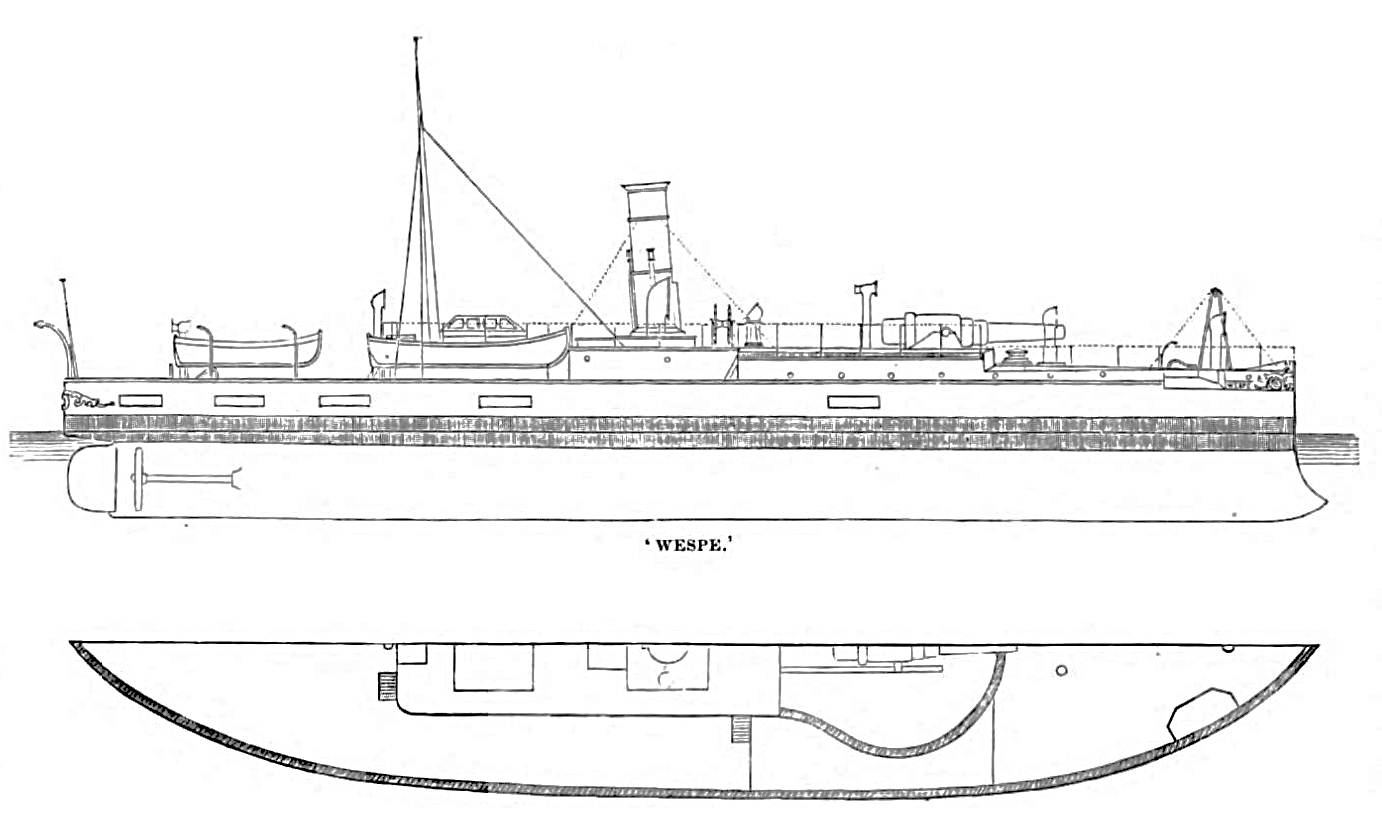
Plan and profile of the Wespe class in their original configuration

Development of the Wespe class of ironclad gunboats began in the 1850s, after the first ironclads were introduced during the Crimean War. Through the 1860s, the Federal Convention examined various proposals, ranging from plans to build eight to as many as eighteen armored warships. The decision was finalized based on the fleet plan conceived by General Albrecht von Stosch, the new Chief of the Kaiserliche Admiralität (Imperial Admiralty), in the early 1870s. He envisioned a fleet oriented on defense of Germany's Baltic and North Sea coasts, which would be led by the ironclad corvettes of the Sachsen class. These were to be supported by larger numbers of small, armored gunboats, which became the Wespe class.

Viper was 46.4 meters (152 ft 3 in) long overall, with a beam of 10.6 m (34 ft 9 in). The ships of the Wespe class had a draft of 3.2 to 3.4 m (10 to 11 ft). She displaced 1,098 metric tons (1,081 long tons) as designed and increasing to 1,163 t (1,145 long tons) at full load. The ship's crew consisted of 3 officers and 73 to 85 enlisted men. She was powered by a pair of double-expansion steam engines that drove a pair of 4-bladed screw propellers, with steam provided by four coal-fired cylindrical fire-tube boilers, which gave her a top speed of 10.4 knots (19.3 km/h; 12.0 mph) at 800 metric horsepower (790 ihp). At a cruising speed of 7 knots (13 km/h; 8.1 mph), she could steam for 700 nautical miles (1,300 km; 810 mi).

The ship was armed with one 30.5 cm (12 in) MRK L/22 gun in a barbette mount that had a limited arc of traverse. In practice, the gun was aimed by turning the ship in the direction of fire. The Wespes were intended to beach themselves on the sandbars along the German coastline to serve as semi-mobile coastal artillery batteries. The armored barbette was protected by 203 mm (8 in) of wrought iron, backed with 210 mm (8.3 in) of teak. The ship was fitted with a waterline armor belt that was 102 to 203 mm (4 to 8 in) thick, with the thickest section protecting the propulsion machinery spaces and ammunition magazine. The belt was backed with 210 mm of teak. An armor deck that consisted of two layers of 22 mm (0.87 in) of iron on 28 mm (1.1 in) of teak provided additional protection against enemy fire.

== Service history ==
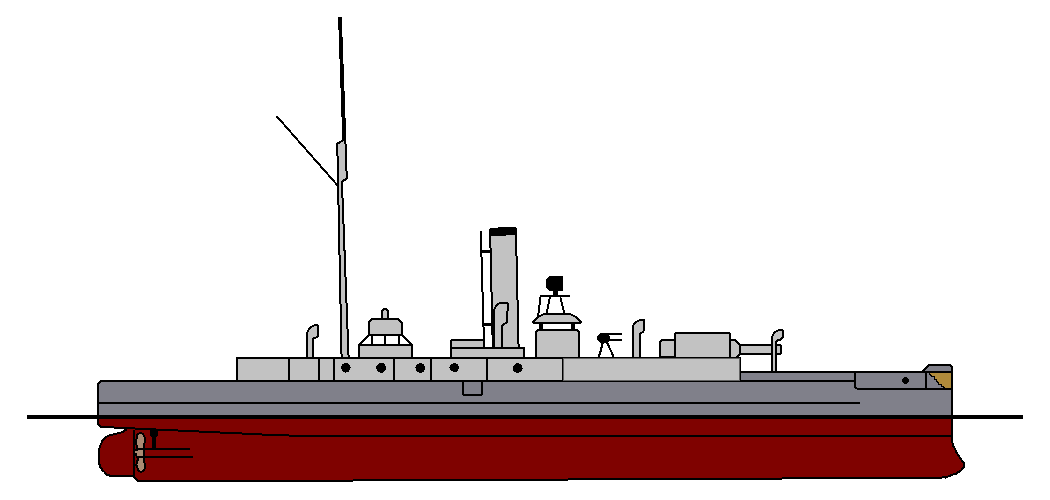
Profile drawing of the Wespe class as they appeared c. 1900

Viper was laid down at the AG Weser shipyard in Bremen in May 1875 under the provisional designation "B", (Note: German warships were ordered under provisional names. Additions to the fleet were given a single letter; ships intended to replace older or lost vessels were ordered as "Ersatz (name of the ship to be replaced)".) and she was launched on 21 September 1876. The second member of her class to be built, she was named after the family of venomous snakes. Work on the ship was completed early the following year, and she was commissioned into active service on 27 March 1877 to carry out her initial sea trials, after which she was placed in reserve for the next eight years. During this period, by 1883, the ship had been refitted with an additional 8.7 cm (3.4 in) L/24 built-up gun, a pair of 37 mm (1.5 in) Hotchkiss revolver cannon, and two 35 cm (13.8 in) torpedo tubes in her bow, both of which were below the waterline.

Viper was recommissioned on 20 August 1885 for training exercises carried out with her sister ships Wespe, Salamander, and Mücke, which were led by the screw corvette Stein. These concluded by 14 September, when Viper was decommissioned for the winter months. While she was out of service, she was allocated to the Reserve Division of the North Sea. She recommissioned on 11 May 1886 for another training period that lasted until 9 June. She exercised with Wespe, Salamander, and their sister Camaeleon at that time. Viper next returned to service on 16 August 1887, and that year, she and the rest of the gunboats in the North Sea joined the main fleet for the annual autumn exercises. That year, the gunboat division consisted of Viper, Salamander, Camaeleon, and Mücke, the latter serving as the divisional flagship. These exercises had concluded by 14 September, when the ship was decommissioned again. Viper and the other gunboats performed poorly in the rough waters of the North Sea, and at times were unable to fire their main gun due to their poor seakeeping. These exercises demonstrated that the Wespe-class gunboats could not be used far from shore, and were of little use beyond local defensive operations.

On 15 August 1888, Viper was recommissioned, under command of Kapitänleutnant (KL—Captain Lieutenant) Oskar von Truppel, for another brief training period that lasted until 15 September. The gunboat division again consisted of the same four vessels from 1887. The four gunboats were used to test the effectiveness of using them and a group of torpedo boats to support coastal fortifications, which produced a measure of success. Later that year, she was moved to the newly created II Reserve Division of the North Sea. The next two years followed a similar pattern; she participated in training exercises from 13 August to 20 September 1890 and then from 4 August to 22 September 1891, the last time she would be commissioned. The last year, she was captained by KL Karl Dick. The ship was struck from the naval register on 28 June 1909 and then converted into a crane ship between 1909 and 1910. She was initially based at the island of Helgoland. The ship had a lifting capacity of 100 t (98 long tons; 110 short tons). She was later moved to Wilhelmshaven, and then other ports.

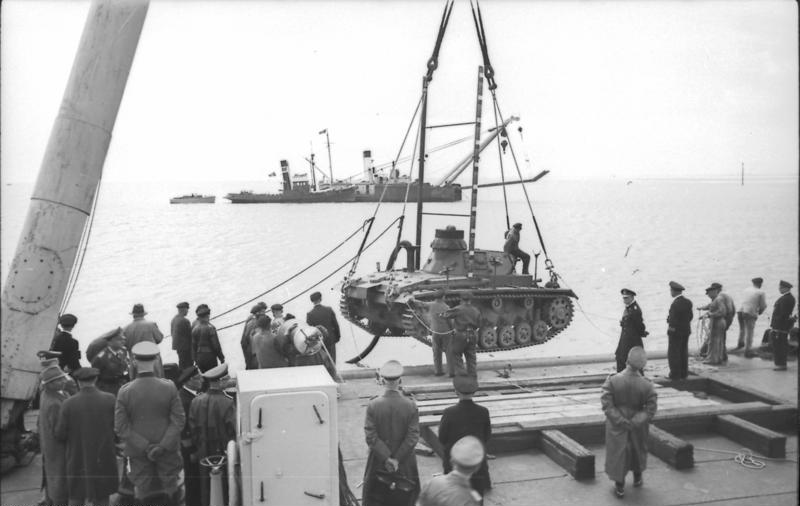
Viper (background, with a smaller boat alongside) during tests with a Tauchpanzer III before Operation Sea Lion in 1940

In May 1918, Viper was sent to the coast of Finland to assist in the salvage of the dreadnought battleship Rheinland that had run aground off the island of Åland during the German occupation of the island during the Finnish Civil War. Viper arrived on 8 May and was used to remove significant sections of armor plate and the battleship's main guns in an attempt to lighten the vessel enough that she could be pulled free. In the course of the effort, Viper removed around 6,400 t (6,300 long tons; 7,100 short tons) of material from Rheinland, and by 9 July, the ship was successfully refloated.

By 1924, Viper had been moved back to Wilhelmshaven. In 1940, during World War II, the ship was allocated to the invasion fleet for the planned invasion of Britain, Operation Sea Lion. For the planned amphibious assault, Viper was fitted with an experimental ramp to send amphibious Tauchpanzer III tanks ashore; the concept involved sending the tank into the water at a depth of around 5 m (16 ft), which would then drive onto the beach. The plan was postponed and eventually cancelled, however, after the Germans failed to secure air superiority in the Battle of Britain. The ship survived the war and was still in use as of 1970.
