= SMS Biene =

German ironclad gunboat

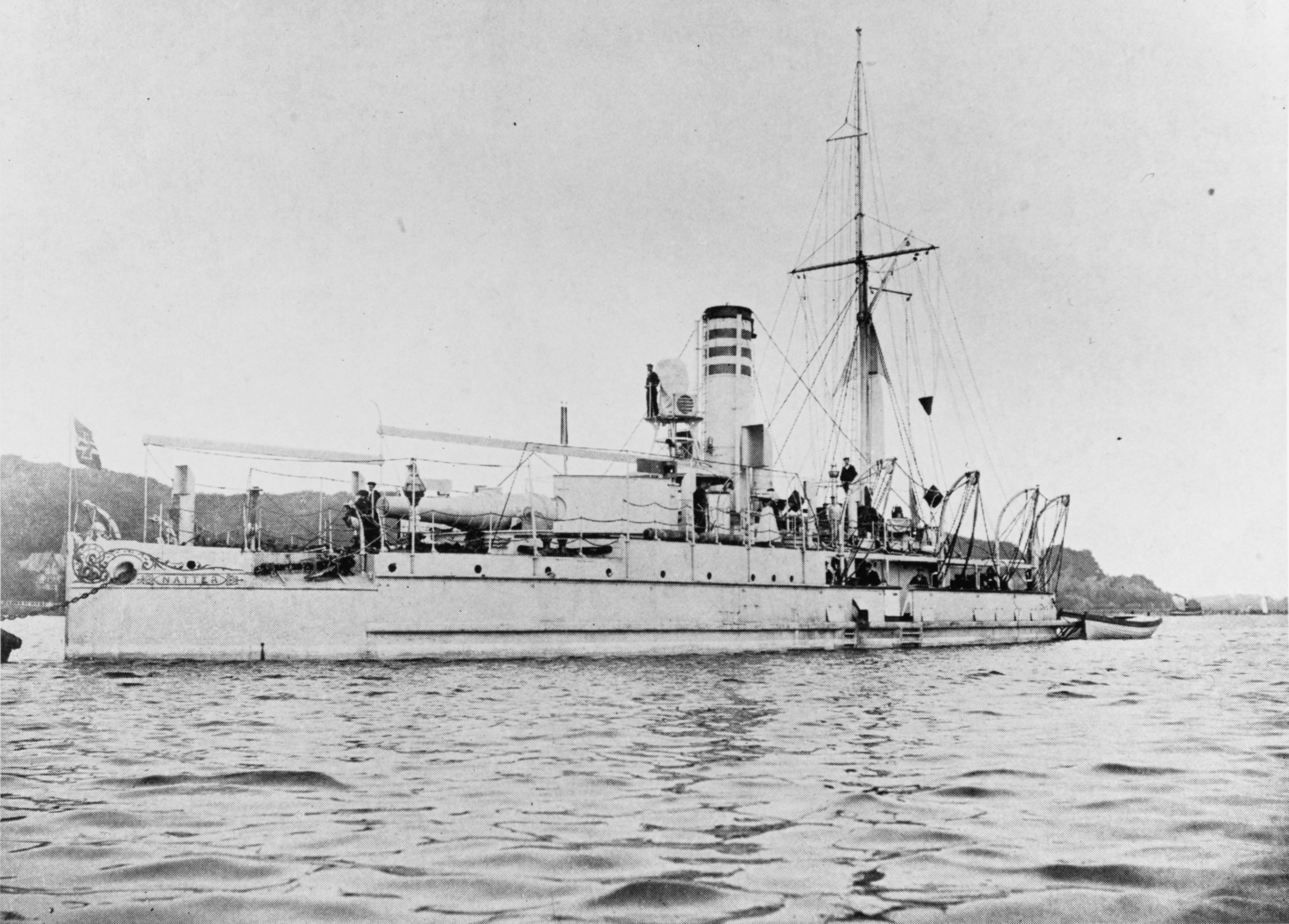
- Biene's sister ship Natter in Kiel

History
- Name: Biene
- Namesake: Bee
- Operator: Imperial German Navy
- Builder: AG Weser, Bremen
- Laid down: 1876
- Launched: 2 December 1876
- Commissioned: 20 August 1877
- Decommissioned: 12 June 1884
- Stricken: 27 September 1910
- Fate: Broken up, 1921

General characteristics
- Class & type: Wespe-class gunboat
- Displacement: Design: 1,098 t (1,081 long tons); Full load: 1,163 t (1,145 long tons)
- Length: 46.4 m (152 ft 3 in)
- Beam: 10.6 m (34 ft 9 in)
- Draft: 3.2 to 3.4 m (10 ft 6 in to 11 ft 2 in)
- Installed power: 4 × fire-tube boilers; 711 PS (701 ihp)
- Propulsion: 2 × double-expansion steam engines; 2 × screw propellers
- Speed: 11 knots (20 km/h; 13 mph)
- Range: 700 nmi (1,300 km; 810 mi) at 7 knots (13 km/h; 8.1 mph)
- Complement: 3 officers; 73–85 enlisted
- Armament: 1 × 30.5 cm (12 in) MRK L/22 gun
- Armor: Belt: 102 to 203 mm (4 to 8 in); Barbette: 203 mm (8 in); Deck: 44 mm (1.7 in)

SMS Biene was an ironclad gunboat of the Wespe class built for the German Kaiserliche Marine (Imperial Navy) in the 1870s. The ships, which were armed with a single 30.5 cm (12 in) MRK L/22 gun, were intended to serve as part of a coastal defense fleet. Biene saw very little active service over her lengthy existence, taking part in training exercises in 1881 and 1884. During the latter period, she was damaged in an accident, and after being repaired, was laid up for the next twenty-five years. Struck from the naval register in 1910, Biene was then used as a floating workshop for another decade before being broken up in 1921.

== Design ==
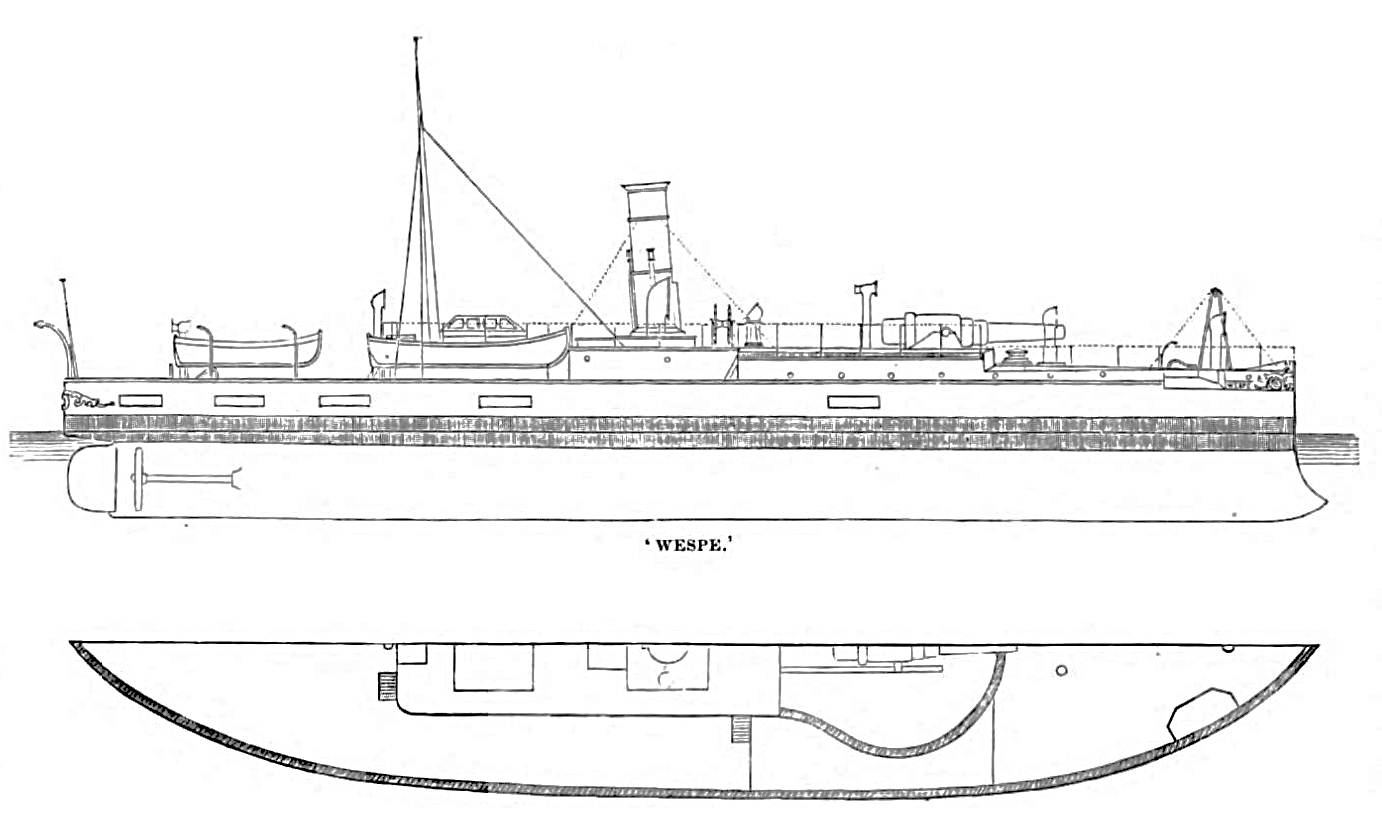
Plan and profile of the Wespe class in their original configuration

Development of the Wespe class of ironclad gunboats began in the 1850s, after the first ironclads were introduced during the Crimean War. Through the 1860s, the Federal Convention examined various proposals, ranging from plans to build eight to as many as eighteen armored warships. The decision was finalized based on the fleet plan conceived by General Albrecht von Stosch, the new Chief of the Kaiserliche Admiralität (Imperial Admiralty), in the early 1870s. He envisioned a fleet oriented on defense of Germany's Baltic and North Sea coasts, which would be led by the ironclad corvettes of the Sachsen class. These were to be supported by larger numbers of small, armored gunboats, which became the Wespe class.

Biene was 46.4 meters (152 ft 3 in) long overall, with a beam of 10.6 m (34 ft 9 in). The ships of the Wespe class had a draft of 3.2 to 3.4 m (10 to 11 ft). She displaced 1,098 metric tons (1,081 long tons) as designed and increasing to 1,163 t (1,145 long tons) at full load. The ship's crew consisted of 3 officers and 73 to 85 enlisted men. She was powered by a pair of double-expansion steam engines that drove a pair of 4-bladed screw propellers, with steam provided by four coal-fired cylindrical fire-tube boilers, which gave her a top speed of 11 knots (20 km/h; 13 mph) at 711 metric horsepower (701 ihp). At a cruising speed of 7 knots (13 km/h; 8.1 mph), she could steam for 700 nautical miles (1,300 km; 810 mi).

The ship was armed with one 30.5 cm (12 in) MRK L/22 gun in a barbette mount that had a limited arc of traverse. In practice, the gun was aimed by turning the ship in the direction of fire. The Wespes were intended to beach themselves on the sandbars along the German coastline to serve as semi-mobile coastal artillery batteries. The armored barbette was protected by 203 mm (8 in) of wrought iron, backed with 210 mm (8.3 in) of teak. The ship was fitted with a waterline armor belt that was 102 to 203 mm (4 to 8 in) thick, with the thickest section protecting the propulsion machinery spaces and ammunition magazine. The belt was backed with 210 mm of teak. An armor deck that consisted of two layers of 22 mm (0.87 in) of iron on 28 mm (1.1 in) of teak provided additional protection against enemy fire.

== Service history ==
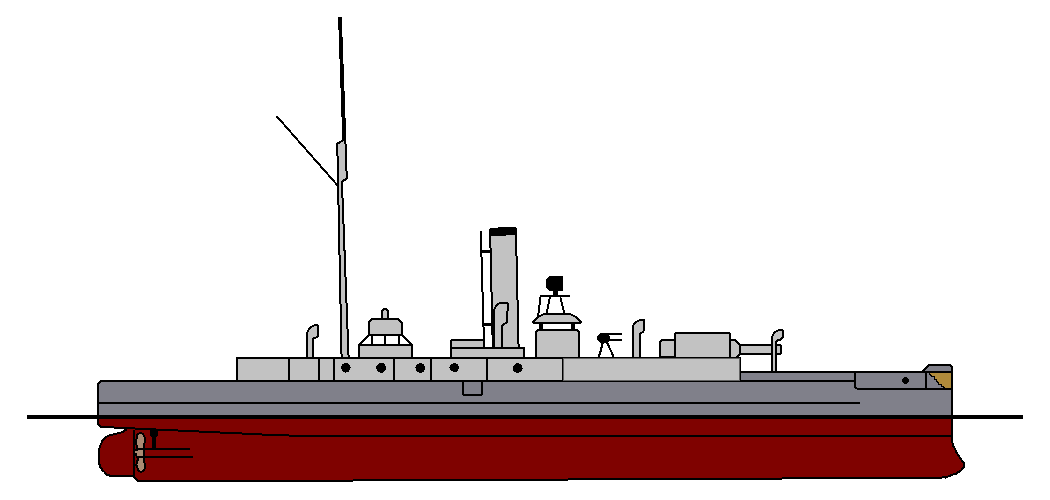
Profile drawing of the Wespe class as they appeared c. 1900

The keel for Biene, named after the common bee, was laid down at the AG Weser shipyard in Bremen in 1876 under the contract name "C", (Note: German warships were ordered under provisional names. Additions to the fleet were given a single letter; ships intended to replace older or lost vessels were ordered as "Ersatz (name of the ship to be replaced)".) and she was launched on 2 December 1876. Work on the ship was continued through mid-1877, and she was commissioned into active service on 20 August. The ship was pronounced ready for service on 17 October, but she was instead placed in reserve, where she would remain for the next four years. The ship was next commissioned on 20 August 1881, initially to conduct training cruises to prepare crews to man ships of the class. Some three weeks later, however, Biene received orders to move to Kiel to join a flotilla with three of her sister ships that were stationed there. The voyage through the Skagerrak, Kattegat, and Danish Straits took three days to complete, and she arrived at her destination on 11 September. She was present for a fleet review held during a visit by Kaiser Wilhelm I on 16 September. The following day, Biene was laid up in the Kaiserliche Werft (Imperial Shipyard) in Kiel.

By 1883, the ship had been refitted with an additional pair of 8.7 cm (3.4 in) L/24 built-up guns, a pair of 37 mm (1.5 in) Hotchkiss revolver cannon, and two 35 cm (13.8 in) torpedo tubes in her bow, both of which were below the waterline. Biene next recommissioned on 22 April 1884 to join the Armored Gunboat Division, which included her sisters Hummel, Camaeleon, and Crocodill, and was led by the aviso Grille, the flagship of Kapitän zur See (Captain at Sea) Karl August Deinhard. The exercises began on 5 May in the waters off Rügen and concluded at the end of the month. Biene was damaged in an accident in the Rügischer Bodden on 8 June, and she had to return to the Kaiserliche Werft in Kiel for repairs. She was decommissioned there on 12 June.

After repairs were completed, Biene was assigned to the Marinestation der Ostsee (Baltic Sea Naval Station), but she saw no further active service. On 27 September 1910, Biene was struck from the naval register. She was then converted into a floating work shop and used in that capacity for the next decade. She was then sold in Bremen in 1921 and broken up later that year Wewelsfleth.
