= SMS Crocodill (1879) =

German ironclad gunboat

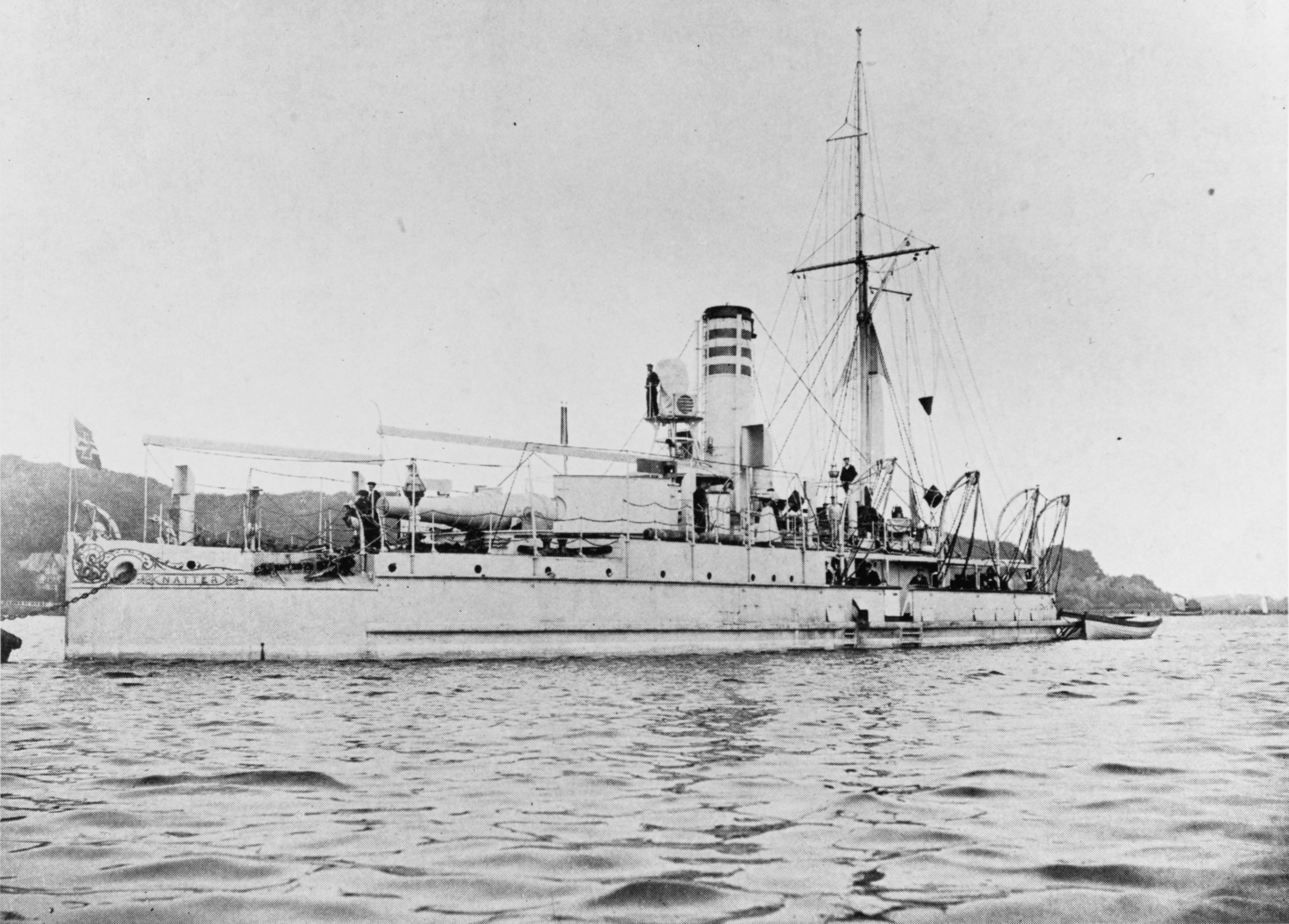
- Crocodill's sister ship Natter in Kiel

History
- Name: Crocodill
- Namesake: SMS Crocodill
- Operator: Imperial German Navy
- Builder: AG Weser, Bremen
- Laid down: 1878
- Launched: 13 September 1879
- Commissioned: 20 September 1880
- Decommissioned: 24 September 1900
- Stricken: 18 March 1911
- Fate: Broken up, 1918

General characteristics
- Class & type: Wespe-class gunboat
- Displacement: Design: 1,098 t (1,081 long tons); Full load: 1,163 t (1,145 long tons)
- Length: 46.4 m (152 ft 3 in)
- Beam: 10.6 m (34 ft 9 in)
- Draft: 3.2 to 3.4 m (10 ft 6 in to 11 ft 2 in)
- Installed power: 4 × fire-tube boilers; 786 PS (775 ihp)
- Propulsion: 2 × double-expansion steam engines; 2 × screw propellers
- Speed: 11.2 knots (20.7 km/h; 12.9 mph)
- Range: 700 nmi (1,300 km; 810 mi) at 7 knots (13 km/h; 8.1 mph)
- Complement: 3 officers; 73–85 enlisted
- Armament: 1 × 30.5 cm (12 in) MRK L/22 gun
- Armor: Belt: 102 to 203 mm (4 to 8 in); Barbette: 203 mm (8 in); Deck: 44 mm (1.7 in)

SMS Crocodill was an ironclad gunboat of the Wespe class built for the German Kaiserliche Marine (Imperial Navy) in the 1870s. The ships, which were armed with a single 30.5 cm (12 in) MRK L/22 gun, were intended to serve as part of a coastal defense fleet. Because Crocodill was a purely defensive vessel, she saw little active use, apart from brief stints in active service for sea trials in 1880, followed by training exercises in 1884 and then in 1894–1895. During the latter period, she served as the flagship of the Wespe-class gunboats assigned to the Baltic Sea. Crocodill reprised the role in 1897 and again in 1900. The ship was struck from the naval register in 1911 and then used as a target ship until 1913, when she was converted into a floating workshop. Crocodill was broken up after 1918.

== Design ==
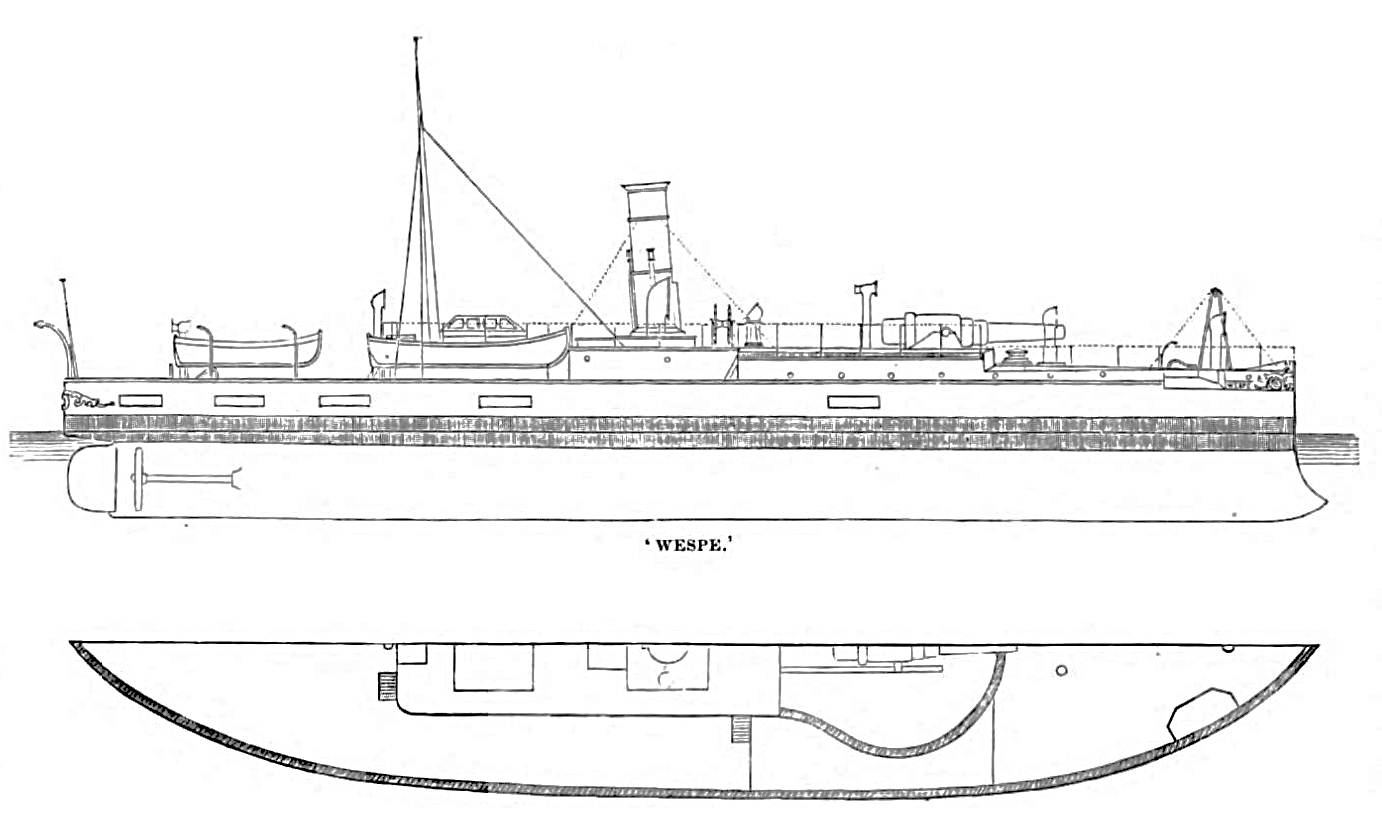
Plan and profile of the Wespe class in their original configuration

Development of the Wespe class of ironclad gunboats began in the 1850s, after the first ironclads were introduced during the Crimean War. Through the 1860s, the Federal Convention examined various proposals, ranging from plans to build eight to as many as eighteen armored warships. The decision was finalized based on the fleet plan conceived by General Albrecht von Stosch, the new Chief of the Kaiserliche Admiralität (Imperial Admiralty), in the early 1870s. He envisioned a fleet oriented on defense of Germany's Baltic and North Sea coasts, which would be led by the ironclad corvettes of the Sachsen class. These were to be supported by larger numbers of small, armored gunboats, which became the Wespe class.

Crocodill was 46.4 meters (152 ft 3 in) long overall, with a beam of 10.6 m (34 ft 9 in). The ships of the Wespe class had a draft of 3.2 to 3.4 m (10 to 11 ft). She displaced 1,098 metric tons (1,081 long tons) as designed and increasing to 1,163 t (1,145 long tons) at full load. The ship's crew consisted of 3 officers and 73 to 85 enlisted men. She was powered by a pair of double-expansion steam engines that drove a pair of 4-bladed screw propellers, with steam provided by four coal-fired cylindrical fire-tube boilers, which gave her a top speed of 11.2 knots (20.7 km/h; 12.9 mph) at 786 metric horsepower (775 ihp). At a cruising speed of 7 knots (13 km/h; 8.1 mph), she could steam for 700 nautical miles (1,300 km; 810 mi).

The ship was armed with one 30.5 cm (12 in) MRK L/22 gun in a barbette mount that had a limited arc of traverse. In practice, the gun was aimed by turning the ship in the direction of fire. The Wespes were intended to beach themselves on the sandbars along the German coastline to serve as semi-mobile coastal artillery batteries. The armored barbette was protected by 203 mm (8 in) of wrought iron, backed with 210 mm (8.3 in) of teak. The ship was fitted with a waterline armor belt that was 102 to 203 mm (4 to 8 in) thick, with the thickest section protecting the propulsion machinery spaces and ammunition magazine. The belt was backed with 210 mm of teak. An armor deck that consisted of two layers of 22 mm (0.87 in) of iron on 28 mm (1.1 in) of teak provided additional protection against enemy fire.

== Service history ==
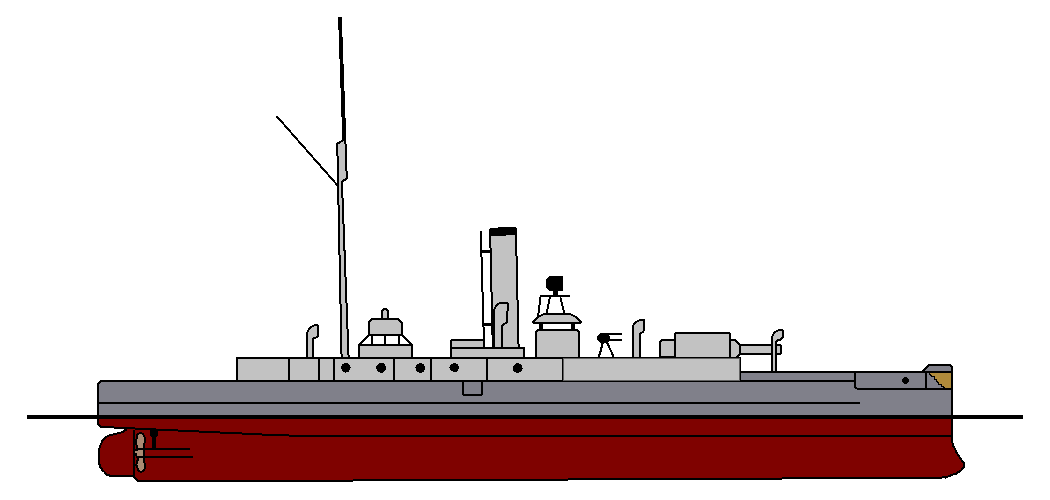
Profile drawing of the Wespe class as they appeared c. 1900

The keel for Crocodill was laid down at the AG Weser shipyard in Bremen in 1878 under the provisional name "H", (Note: German warships were ordered under provisional names. Additions to the fleet were given a single letter; ships intended to replace older or lost vessels were ordered as "Ersatz (name of the ship to be replaced)".) and she was launched on 13 September 1879. Named for the earlier wooden gunboat Crocodill, she was delivered to the navy on 26 May 1880. She remained out of service initially, before being commissioned on 20 September for sea trials under the command of Kapitänleutnant (KL—Captain Lieutenant) Emil Freiherr von Lyncker. Her initial testing was completed by 20 October, when she was decommissioned in Kiel and allocated to the Marinestation der Ostsee (Baltic Sea Naval Station).

Crocodill was commissioned for her first active period of fleet duty on 22 April 1884, under the command of KL Ernst von Frantzius. She joined her sister ships Hummel, Camaeleon, Natter, and Biene in the newly created Armored Gunboat Division. They carried out unit training over the summer, and they joined the rest of the main fleet for the annual maneuvers in August and September. Crocodill was decommissioned again on 30 September. The ship remained out of service for the next decade, and in the early 1890s, she underwent a modernization. The work included installing a pair of 8.7 cm (3.4 in) L/24 built-up guns, a pair of 37 mm (1.5 in) Hotchkiss revolver cannon, and two 35 cm (13.8 in) torpedo tubes in her bow, both of which were below the waterline. Crocodill next returned to service on 13 October 1894, assigned to the Armored Gunboat Reserve Division, which was based in Danzig. She served as the flagship of the division until 5 May 1895, when she was replaced by her sister Mücke. Crocodill was decommissioned at that time for periodic maintenance at the Kaiserliche Werft (Imperial Shipyard) in Danzig.

On 3 August 1897, Crocodill was recommissioned under the command of KL Richard Koch. She remained in service through 1 October, during which time she resumed flagship duties for the gunboat division. She remained in reserve for the next two years, before recommissioning for her last period of active service, which lasted from 27 July to 24 September 1900. KL Siegfried von Jachmann captained the ship that year, and she once again served as the divisional flagship. Crocodill was struck from the naval register on 18 March 1911 and then used as a target ship. In 1913, she was converted into a floating workshop, and was based in Wilhelmshaven. The ship was broken up after 1918.
