= SMS Crocodill =

There were two ships in the Prussian Navy and later German Imperial Navy named SMS Crocodill:

- SMS Crocodill (1860) - a Jäger-class gunboat launched in 1860
- SMS Crocodill (1879) - a Wespe-class armored gunboat launched in 1879

== See also ==
- SMS Krokodil, an Austro-Hungarian torpedo boat launched in 1906
