= SMS Scorpion =

There were two ships in the Prussian Navy and later German Imperial Navy named SMS Scorpion:

- SMS Scorpion (1860) - a Jäger-class gunboat launched in 1860
- SMS Scorpion (1877) - a Wespe-class armored gunboat launched in 1877

== See also ==
- SMS Skorpion, an Austro-Hungarian torpedo boat
