= SMS Basilisk (1878) =

German ironclad gunboat

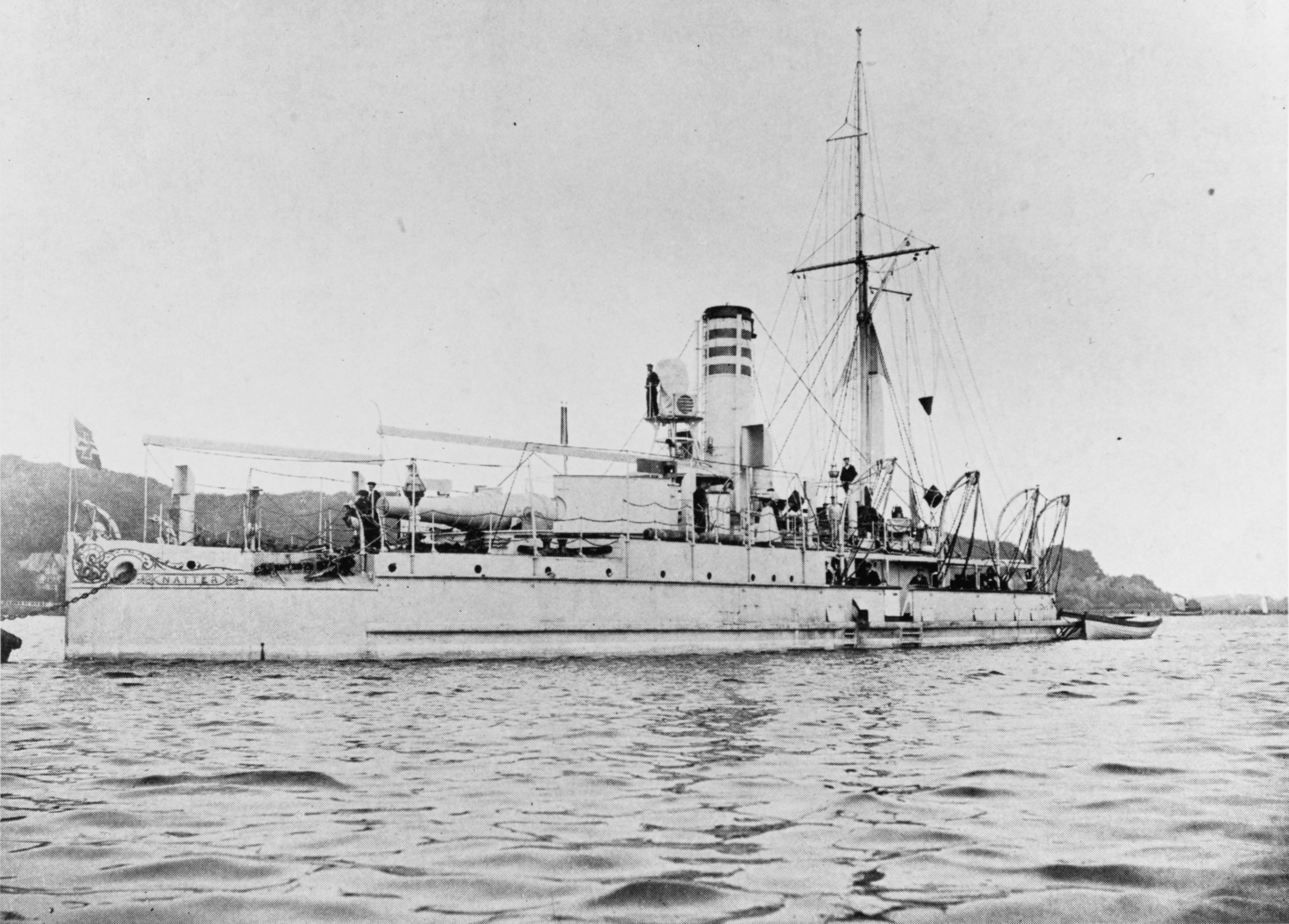
- Basilisk's sister ship Natter in Kiel

History
- Name: Basilisk
- Namesake: SMS Basilisk
- Operator: Imperial German Navy
- Builder: AG Weser, Bremen
- Laid down: September 1877
- Launched: 14 September 1878
- Commissioned: 20 August 1880
- Decommissioned: 18 September 1881
- Stricken: 27 September 1910
- Fate: Broken up, 1920

General characteristics
- Class & type: Wespe-class gunboat
- Displacement: Design: 1,098 t (1,081 long tons); Full load: 1,163 t (1,145 long tons)
- Length: 46.4 m (152 ft 3 in)
- Beam: 10.6 m (34 ft 9 in)
- Draft: 3.2 to 3.4 m (10 ft 6 in to 11 ft 2 in)
- Installed power: 4 × fire-tube boilers; 764 PS (754 ihp)
- Propulsion: 2 × double-expansion steam engines; 2 × screw propellers
- Speed: 11 knots (20 km/h; 13 mph)
- Range: 700 nmi (1,300 km; 810 mi) at 7 knots (13 km/h; 8.1 mph)
- Complement: 3 officers; 73–85 enlisted
- Armament: 1 × 30.5 cm (12 in) MRK L/22 gun
- Armor: Belt: 102 to 203 mm (4 to 8 in); Barbette: 203 mm (8 in); Deck: 44 mm (1.7 in)

SMS Basilisk was an ironclad gunboat of the Wespe class built for the German Kaiserliche Marine (Imperial Navy) in the 1870s. The ships, which were armed with a single 30.5 cm (12 in) MRK L/22 gun, were intended to serve as part of a coastal defense fleet. Because Basilisk was a purely defensive vessel, she saw little active use, apart from brief stints in active service for sea trials upon completion in 1880, and then again in 1881. The ship remained in the fleet's inventory until 1910, when it was discarded. She was eventually sold to ship breakers in 1919 and dismantled the following year.

== Design ==
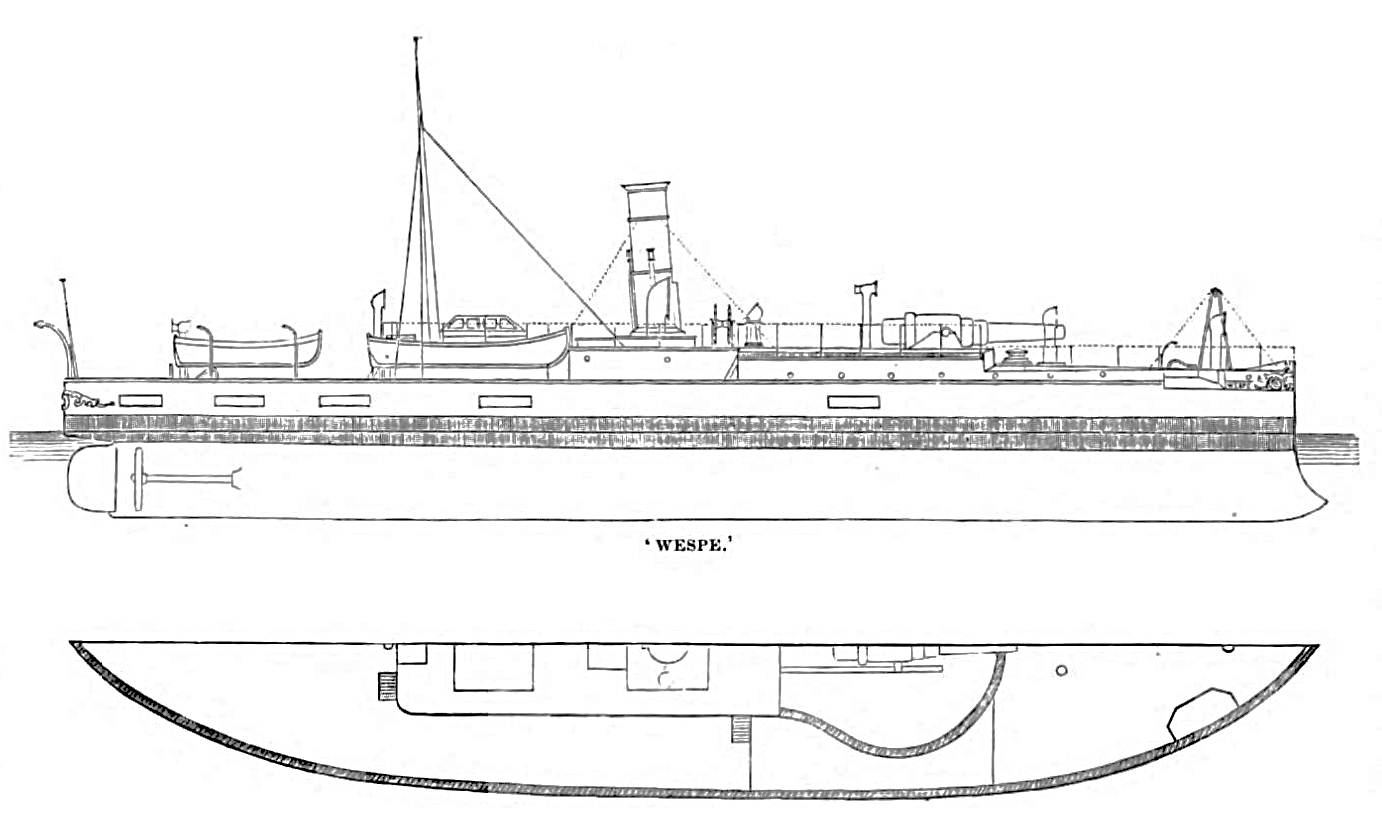
Plan and profile of the Wespe class in their original configuration

Development of the Wespe class of ironclad gunboats began in the 1850s, after the first ironclads were introduced during the Crimean War. Through the 1860s, the Federal Convention examined various proposals, ranging from plans to build eight to as many as eighteen armored warships. The decision was finalized based on the fleet plan conceived by General Albrecht von Stosch, the new Chief of the Kaiserliche Admiralität (Imperial Admiralty), in the early 1870s. He envisioned a fleet oriented on defense of Germany's Baltic and North Sea coasts, which would be led by the ironclad corvettes of the Sachsen class. These were to be supported by larger numbers of small, armored gunboats, which became the Wespe class.

Basilisk was 46.4 meters (152 ft 3 in) long overall, with a beam of 10.6 m (34 ft 9 in). The ships of the Wespe class had a draft of 3.2 to 3.4 m (10 to 11 ft). She displaced 1,098 metric tons (1,081 long tons) as designed and increasing to 1,163 t (1,145 long tons) at full load. The ship's crew consisted of 3 officers and 73 to 85 enlisted men. She was powered by a pair of double-expansion steam engines that drove a pair of 4-bladed screw propellers, with steam provided by four coal-fired cylindrical fire-tube boilers, which gave her a top speed of 11 knots (20 km/h; 13 mph) at 764 metric horsepower (754 ihp). At a cruising speed of 7 knots (13 km/h; 8.1 mph), she could steam for 700 nautical miles (1,300 km; 810 mi).

The ship was armed with one 30.5 cm (12 in) MRK L/22 gun in a barbette mount that had a limited arc of traverse. In practice, the gun was aimed by turning the ship in the direction of fire. The Wespes were intended to beach themselves on the sandbars along the German coastline to serve as semi-mobile coastal artillery batteries. The armored barbette was protected by 203 mm (8 in) of wrought iron, backed with 210 mm (8.3 in) of teak. The ship was fitted with a waterline armor belt that was 102 to 203 mm (4 to 8 in) thick, with the thickest section protecting the propulsion machinery spaces and ammunition magazine. The belt was backed with 210 mm of teak. An armor deck that consisted of two layers of 22 mm (0.87 in) of iron on 28 mm (1.1 in) of teak provided additional protection against enemy fire.

== Service history ==
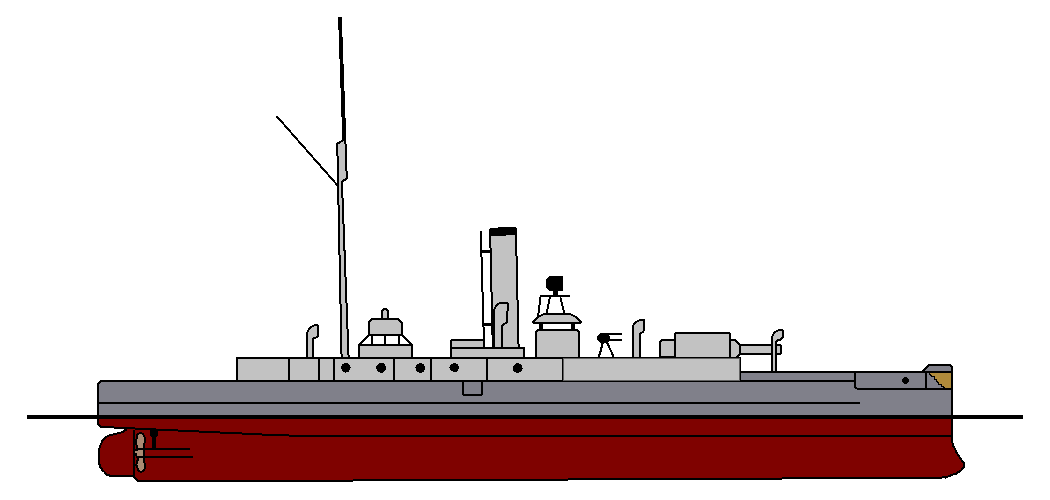
Profile drawing of the Wespe class as they appeared c. 1900

The keel for Basilisk was laid down at the AG Weser shipyard in Bremen in September 1877, under the contract designation "F". (Note: German warships were ordered under provisional names. Additions to the fleet were given a single letter; ships intended to replace older or lost vessels were ordered as "Ersatz (name of the ship to be replaced)".) She was launched on 14 September 1878. She was named after the earlier Basilisk, a steam gunboat from the 1860s. Work on the ship was completed nearly two years later, and she was commissioned into active service on 20 August 1880. She conducted her initial sea trials under the command of Leutnant zur See (Lieutenant at Sea) Emil Freiherr von Lyncker; this round of testing continued until 17 September, when she was temporarily decommissioned. She was reactivated just ten days later, again under Lyncker's command to participate in training exercises. She was decommissioned again for the winter months on 20 November.

Basilisk was present (but not commissioned) for a fleet review held on 16 August 1881 held for Kaiser Wilhelm I. She was recommissioned again on 20 August for another period of training with other elements of the fleet. These maneuvers lasted until 18 September, when she was decommissioned again. By 1883, the ship had been refitted with an additional 8.7 cm (3.4 in) L/24 built-up gun, a pair of 37 mm (1.5 in) Hotchkiss revolver cannon, and two 35 cm (13.8 in) torpedo tubes in her bow, both of which were below the waterline.

The ship saw no further active service, however, and remained in the reserve fleet for more than twenty years. Basilisk was struck from the naval register on 27 September 1910. The navy used the ship for hull leakage tests, and in 1919, sold Basilisk for scrap. She was broken up the following year in Hamburg.
