= SMS Scorpion (1877) =

German ironclad gunboat

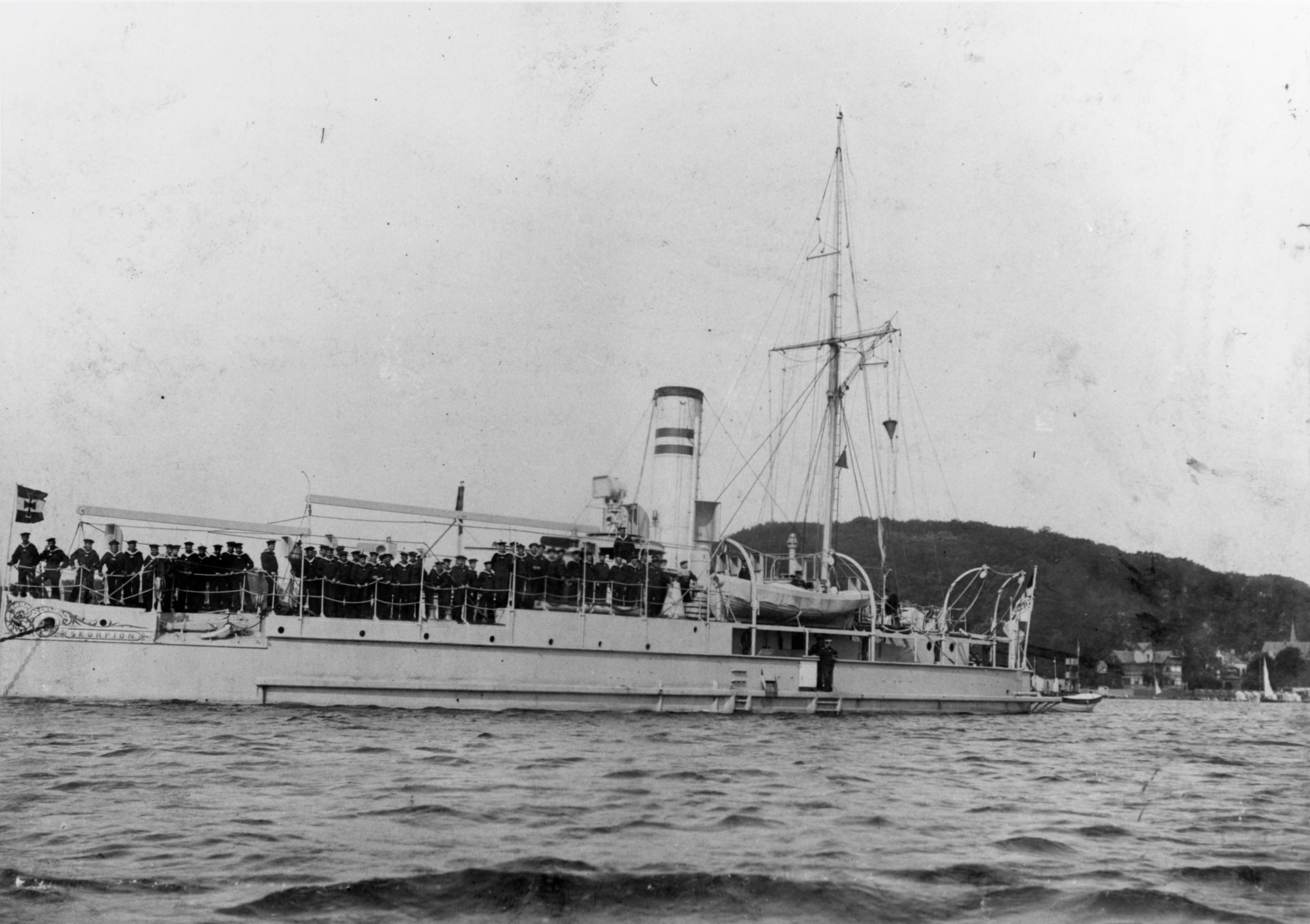
- Scorpion in Kiel in the 1890s

History
- Name: Scorpion
- Namesake: SMS Scorpion
- Operator: Imperial German Navy
- Builder: AG Weser, Bremen
- Laid down: July 1876
- Launched: 19 May 1877
- Commissioned: 12 December 1877
- Decommissioned: 20 September 1900
- Stricken: 18 March 1911

General characteristics
- Class & type: Wespe-class gunboat
- Displacement: Design: 1,098 t (1,081 long tons); Full load: 1,163 t (1,145 long tons)
- Length: 46.4 m (152 ft 3 in)
- Beam: 10.6 m (34 ft 9 in)
- Draft: 3.2 to 3.4 m (10 ft 6 in to 11 ft 2 in)
- Installed power: 4 × fire-tube boilers; 764 PS (754 ihp)
- Propulsion: 2 × double-expansion steam engines; 2 × screw propellers
- Speed: 11 knots (20 km/h; 13 mph)
- Range: 700 nmi (1,300 km; 810 mi) at 7 knots (13 km/h; 8.1 mph)
- Complement: 3 officers; 73–85 enlisted
- Armament: 1 × 30.5 cm (12 in) MRK L/22 gun
- Armor: Belt: 102 to 203 mm (4 to 8 in); Barbette: 203 mm (8 in); Deck: 44 mm (1.7 in)

SMS Scorpion was an ironclad gunboat of the Wespe class built for the German Kaiserliche Marine (Imperial Navy) in the 1870s. The ships, which were armed with a single 30.5 cm (12 in) MRK L/22 gun, were intended to serve as part of a coastal defense fleet. Because Scorpion was a purely defensive vessel, she saw little active use, apart from brief stints in active service for sea trials upon completion in 1878 and then infrequently for training exercises in 1885 and the late 1890s. The ship was eventually struck from the naval register in 1911 and converted into a torpedo launching platform, a role she filled until after the end of World War I in 1918. Scorpion lingered on as a floating workshop until 1924, when she was broken up.

== Design ==
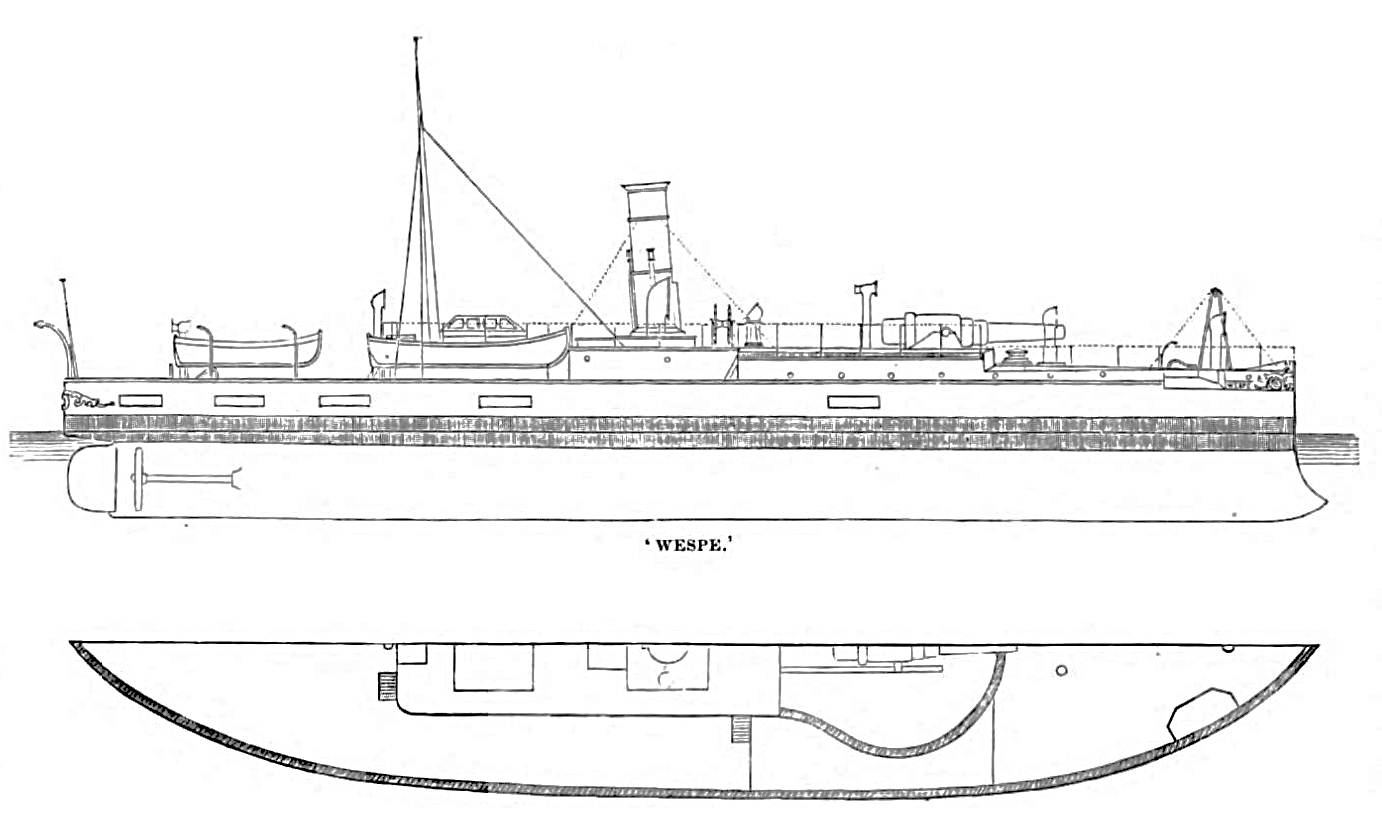
Plan and profile of the Wespe class in their original configuration

Development of the Wespe class of ironclad gunboats began in the 1850s, after the first ironclads were introduced during the Crimean War. Through the 1860s, the Federal Convention examined various proposals, ranging from plans to build eight to as many as eighteen armored warships. The decision was finalized based on the fleet plan conceived by General Albrecht von Stosch, the new Chief of the Kaiserliche Admiralität (Imperial Admiralty), in the early 1870s. He envisioned a fleet oriented on defense of Germany's Baltic and North Sea coasts, which would be led by the ironclad corvettes of the Sachsen class. These were to be supported by larger numbers of small, armored gunboats, which became the Wespe class.

Scorpion was 46.4 meters (152 ft 3 in) long overall, with a beam of 10.6 m (34 ft 9 in). The ships of the Wespe class had a draft of 3.2 to 3.4 m (10 to 11 ft). She displaced 1,098 metric tons (1,081 long tons) as designed and increasing to 1,163 t (1,145 long tons) at full load. The ship's crew consisted of 3 officers and 73 to 85 enlisted men. She was powered by a pair of double-expansion steam engines that drove a pair of 4-bladed screw propellers, with steam provided by four coal-fired cylindrical fire-tube boilers, which gave her a top speed of 11 knots (20 km/h; 13 mph) at 764 metric horsepower (754 ihp). At a cruising speed of 7 knots (13 km/h; 8.1 mph), she could steam for 700 nautical miles (1,300 km; 810 mi).

The ship was armed with one 30.5 cm (12 in) MRK L/22 gun in a barbette mount that had a limited arc of traverse. In practice, the gun was aimed by turning the ship in the direction of fire. The Wespes were intended to beach themselves on the sandbars along the German coastline to serve as semi-mobile coastal artillery batteries. The armored barbette was protected by 203 mm (8 in) of wrought iron, backed with 210 mm (8.3 in) of teak. The ship was fitted with a waterline armor belt that was 102 to 203 mm (4 to 8 in) thick, with the thickest section protecting the propulsion machinery spaces and ammunition magazine. The belt was backed with 210 mm of teak. An armor deck that consisted of two layers of 22 mm (0.87 in) of iron on 28 mm (1.1 in) of teak provided additional protection against enemy fire.

== Service history ==
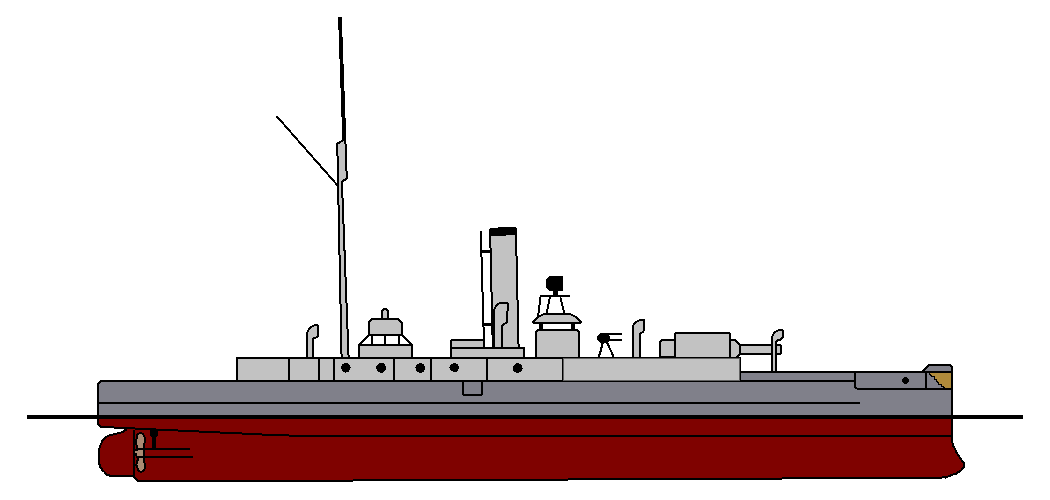
Profile drawing of the Wespe class as they appeared c. 1900

Scorpion, named for the earlier gunboat Scorpion, was built at the AG Weser shipyard in Bremen, initially ordered under the provisional designation "E". (Note: German warships were ordered under provisional names. Additions to the fleet were given a single letter; ships intended to replace older or lost vessels were ordered as "Ersatz (name of the ship to be replaced)".) Her keel was laid down in July 1876, and she was launched on 19 May 1877. Alexander Georg Mosle, the director of the shipyard and also a member of the Reichstag (Imperial Diet), gave a speech during the launching ceremony. Work on the ship was completed late that year, and she was commissioned into active service on 12 December. After sea trials, she was placed in reserve, and saw no further service for the next several years. In this time, by 1883, the ship had been refitted with an additional pair of 8.7 cm (3.4 in) L/24 built-up guns, a pair of 37 mm (1.5 in) Hotchkiss revolver cannon, and two 35 cm (13.8 in) torpedo tubes in her bow, both of which were below the waterline. Scorpion recommissioned for the first time on 5 September 1885, for a short period of training exercises as part of the Marinestation der Nordsee (North Sea Naval Station). These took place in Jade Bight and the outer roadstead, and concluded on 8 October. Scorpion then returned to the reserve fleet.

The ship remained out of service for another decade, before being reactivated on 13 July 1895 for service with the Armored Gunboat Division, based in Danzig in the Baltic Sea. This lasted for less than three weeks, and Scorpion was again placed in reserve on 1 August. She returned to active service on 3 August 1897, under the command of Kapitänleutnant (Captain Lieutenant) Friedrich Musculus. Over the next two months, she participated in the fleet's annual training maneuvers, as part of the Armored Gunboat Reserve Division. Following the conclusion of the exercises, Scorpion was decommissioned on 1 October. The ship was recommissioned on 1 October 1898, and at this time served as the flagship of the Armored Gunboat Reserve Division. She led training cruises off the coast of East Prussia that concluded on 11 November. In 1899, Scorpion spent the summer months, from 6 June to 15 September, as part of the Training Fleet.

Scorpion remained in active service through much of 1900. During this period, on 16 June, she and her sister Natter represented the German fleet at the opening of the Elbe–Lübeck Canal, which was officiated by Kaiser Wilhelm II. In July, the four Brandenburg-class battleships were sent to China in response to the Boxer Uprising, so Scorpion, Natter, and their sisters Mücke and Crocodill took their place in the annual fleet maneuvers. Following the exercises, she made a training cruise to Kiel. She was decommissioned for the last time on 24 September in Danzig, where she was laid up at the Kaiserliche Werft (Imperial Shipyard). The ship was struck from the naval register on 18 March 1911, and was then converted into a stationary torpedo firing platform for use by the torpedo workshop in Flensburg. She was used in that capacity through World War I until 1918. She was eventually sold on 3 August 1919, after which she was used as a floating workshop to assist in ship breaking in Kiel. Scorpion was herself broken up in 1924.
