= Wespe-class gunboat =

Class of eleven German ironclad gunboats

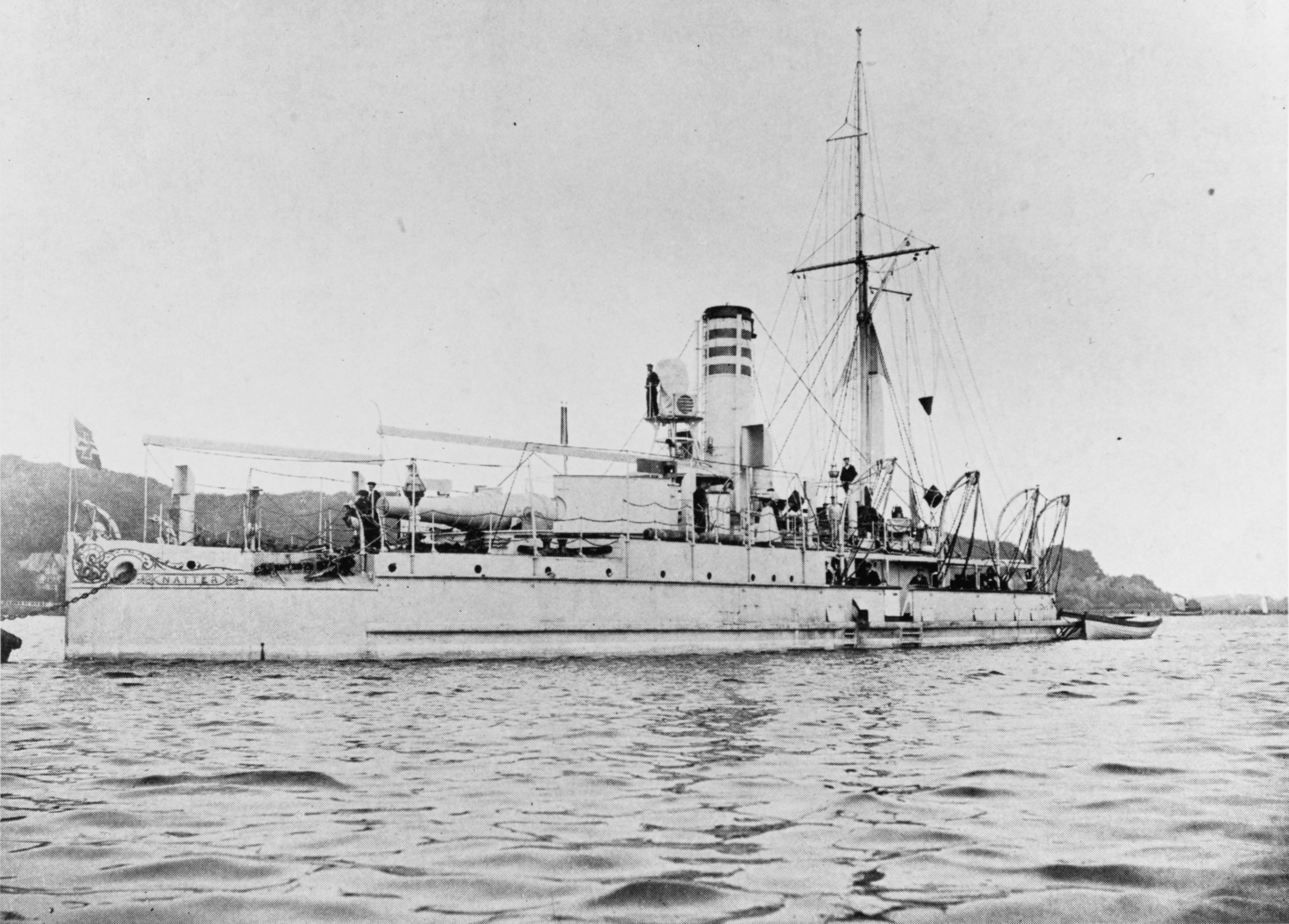
- Natter in Kiel

Class overview
- Name: Wespe class
- Builders: AG Weser, Bremen
- Operators: Imperial German Navy
- Preceded by: Albatross class
- Succeeded by: Otter
- Built: 1875–1881
- In service: 1876–1970
- In commission: 1876–1900
- Completed: 11
- Lost: 3

General characteristics
- Type: Gunboat
- Displacement: Design: 1,098 t (1,081 long tons); Full load: 1,163 t (1,145 long tons)
- Length: 46.4 m (152 ft 3 in)
- Beam: 10.6 m (34 ft 9 in)
- Draft: 3.2 to 3.4 m (10 ft 6 in to 11 ft 2 in)
- Installed power: 4 × fire-tube boilers; 800 PS (790 ihp)
- Propulsion: 2 × double-expansion steam engines; 2 × screw propellers
- Speed: 10.4 knots (19.3 km/h; 12.0 mph)
- Complement: 3 officers; 73–85 enlisted
- Armament: 1 × 30.5 cm (12 in) MRK L/22 gun
- Armor: Belt: 102 to 203 mm (4 to 8 in); Barbette: 203 mm (8 in); Deck: 44 mm (1.7 in)

The Wespe-class gunboats were a class of eleven armored steam gunboats built for the German Kaiserliche Marine (Imperial Navy) in the late 1870s and early 1880s. The class comprised Wespe, Viper, Biene, Mücke, Scorpion, Basilisk, Camaeleon, Crocodill, Salamander, Natter, and Hummel. Intended for use as part of Germany's coastal defense plan, the Wespes were armed with a 30.5 cm (12 in) MRK L/22 gun, which was very large for vessels of their size. They were to support the larger Sachsen-class ironclads in the event of war, and were to have operated in shallow coastal waters where larger and more powerful opponents could not pursue them.

The eleven ships saw relatively little active service over the course of their careers in the German fleet. Typically, they were commissioned for brief training exercises through the 1880s and 1890s, and they operated along Germany's North Sea and Baltic Sea coastlines during this period. Between 1909 and 1911, all eleven ships were struck from the naval register and used in other roles, from barges to floating workshops, and in the case of Viper, conversion into a crane ship. Most members of the class were broken up, but Salamander sank on the way to the scrap yard in 1910; Wespe, which had been converted into a dredger in 1911, sank in a storm in 1926; and Hummel, having been converted into a floating anti-aircraft battery during World War II, was sunk by Allied bombers in the final days of the war in May 1945. Viper was in use as a crane ship as late as 1970, but her ultimate fate is unknown.

== Background ==
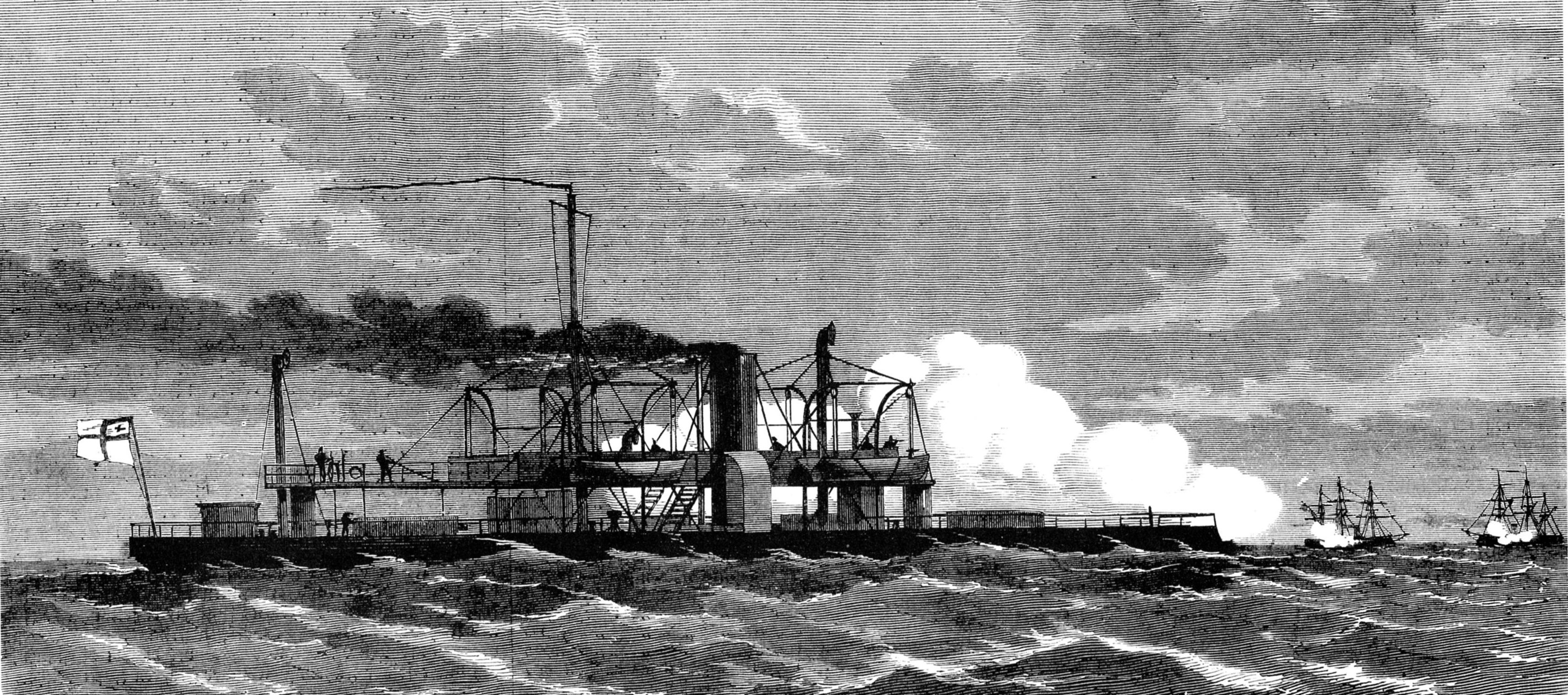
SMS Arminius, the first monitor acquired by the Prussian Navy

In what is now Germany, the first plans for coastal defense centered on the Prussian Navy's use of monitors, e.g. SMS Arminius of about 1,800 metric tons (1,770 long tons; 1,980 short tons) displacement. When the naval mine was developed, the use of such big warships seemed unnecessary. Smaller vessels to defend the mine barriers seemed enough. Nevertheless, in the fleet plan of 1872 created by General Albrecht von Stosch, the new Chief of the Admiralty for the Kaiserliche Marine (Imperial Navy) of the recently unified German Empire, a force of seven monitors and two floating batteries was projected. It was initially believed that the German Baltic Sea coast did not require gunboats. Here, all but two of the harbors had parallel moles. These stretched into the sea on both sides of the fairway. With mine barriers and heavy coastal batteries to protect these, it was thought unnecessary to have gunboats to keep the enemy at bay. By the time the ships of the Wespe class entered service, the naval command realized that gunboats would be needed to defend the Baltic ports, and so several of the ships were stationed in the area.

On the German North Sea coast and the east coast of Schleswig-Holstein the situation was quite different. Here, the Eider, Elbe, Weser, Jade, and Ems exited into shallow waters with many shoals and islands. If the enemy could pass the outer limits of these shallow waters, they could safely anchor and prepare an attack or landing. Vessels defending these areas therefore needed a shallow draft. They also had to defend the local mine barriers. Here, these had to be so far from the coast that they could not to be defended by coastal artillery.

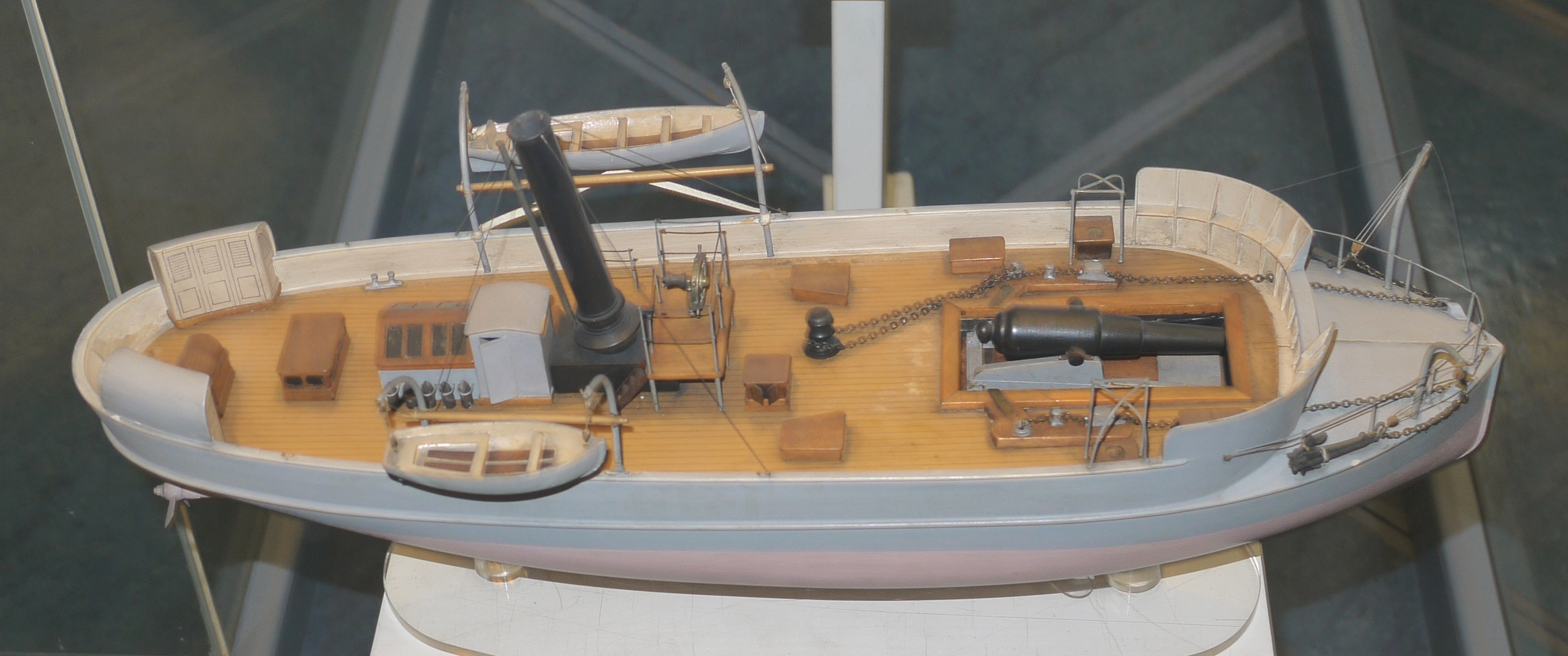
HMS Arrow

After concluding that on the North Sea coast, monitors of about 2,000 t (1,970 long tons; 2,200 short tons) could be replaced by much smaller vessels, the next question was whether these small vessels should be armored or not. Britain, Denmark, the Netherlands, Sweden and Russia opted for unarmored gunboats such as the British Ant-class gunboats and the Dutch Ever-class gunboats. The "unarmored" school of thought proposed small unarmored gunboats with a single heavy gun. It noted that in these circumstances, these boats offered a small target, while their guns could penetrate up to 20 cm (7.9 in) of armor at medium distances. Due to their very shallow draft, these small gunboats could also evade ram attacks. A further advantage was the limited cost of these boats, which of course also meant that one could buy more of these for the cost of larger, armored vessels.

The German Navy looked to the experiences of the Crimean War in 1854–1855 and the American Civil War of 1861–1865, which demonstrated the effectiveness of armored warships. The Germans concluded that an unarmored vessel could only be useful when it was covered by natural heights or a mole. In all other circumstances, it risked swift destruction. The threat by enemy capital ships was apparent, but a less obvious threat was that posed by steam launches (Dampfbeibooten), which carried small guns that were nevertheless capable of damaging unarmored vessels. These light guns were also much more in line with the size of the vessel on which they were mounted, which made the boats more stable and thus capable of more accurate shooting.

== Design ==
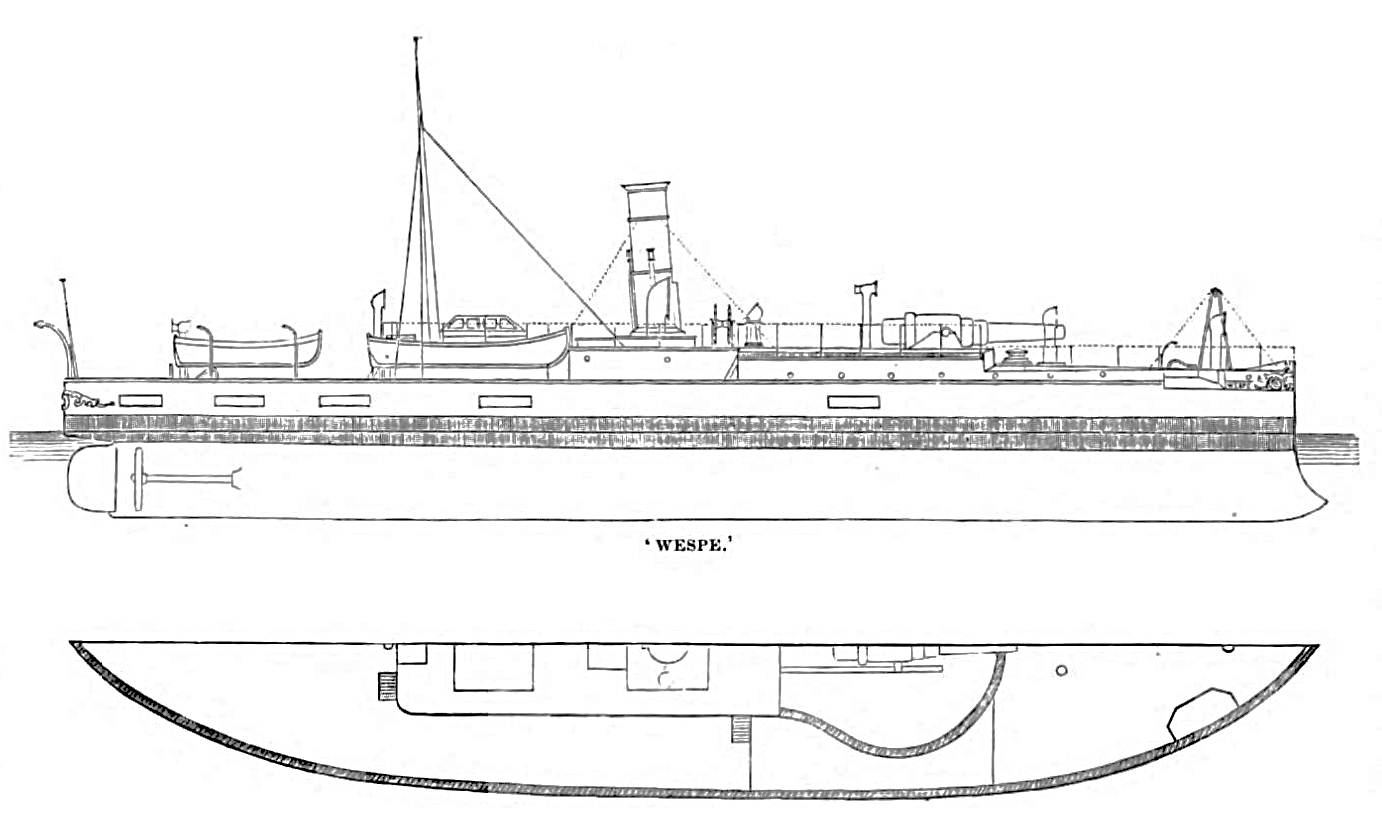
Plan and profile of the Wespe class in their original configuration

Already by 1861, in a memorandum written by General Helmuth von Moltke, the Prussian military had settled on armored gunboats. But the specific type and number of vessels was still to be debated. Over the following decade, a series of proposals was evaluated, which called for at least eight, to as many as eighteen, warships to be built. By 1873, the navy had settled on seven ships, but by 1879, thirteen were to be ordered. These ships were intended to support the operations of the four, much larger Sachsen-class ironclads. Those ships were designated "Ausfallkorvetten" (sortie corvettes), and were intended to sortie from the major ports to attack a blockading squadron.

After the German Navy opted for armored gunboats, it could issue some specifications for new gunboats. The navy required the use of a gun that could penetrate 20 cm (7.9 in) of armor, even at long distances. In turn, the boats should themselves also be protected 20 cm of armor. The gunboats should furthermore be seaworthy and have a shallow draft. The navy required only a limited speed for the vessels. The basic design, which was completed in 1875, was based on the British Ant class. Initially, armor plate had to be imported from Britain, which was used to equip the first five ships of the class. But an initiative by Stosch saw the firm Dillinger Hütte expand to produce domestic armor for the last six ships. This was the first time that German warships were fitted with armor plate that had been manufactured in Germany.

At the time, the Wespe class combined the heaviest gun in the German navy with an armor protection that was comparable to that of many ironclad battleships. It was thought this would allow the boats to engage most enemy capital ships on distances at which most of the enemy's guns could not penetrate the boat's armor. In the coastal area, the shallow-draft boats could then evade again in spite of their low speed. But in practice, the ships proved to be disappointments, as their severe roll badly hampered their stability as a gun platform, meaning that accurate fire was all but impossible in heavier seas. Their armor plate was also quickly surpassed by compound armor, which Dillinger acquired a license to manufacture in 1880. Two further armored gunboats, the Brummer class, were lighter, carried compound plate, and were armed with smaller guns. The naval historian Lawrence Sondhaus characterizes the Wespe design as having "generated less controversy than the Ausfallkorvetten, but [they] were equally ill conceived." David Lyon takes a more positive view, stating that "no doubt they would have been useful vessels in any war off Germany's coast, in their earlier years."

=== General characteristics and machinery ===
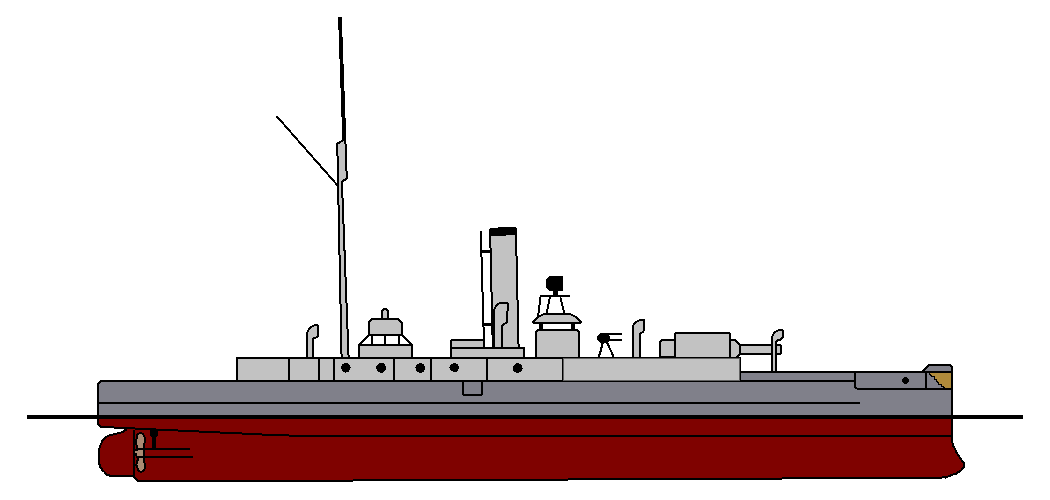
Wespe as she was in about 1900

The Wespe-class gunboats' hulls were made of wrought iron, using transverse iron frame construction. They were 45.4 meters (148 ft 11 in) long at the waterline and 46.4 m (152 ft 3 in) long overall. They had a beam of 10.6 m (34 ft 9 in), a depth of hold of 4.1 m (13 ft 5 in), and a draft of 3.2 to 3.4 m (10 ft 6 in to 11 ft 2 in). They displaced 1,098 t (1,081 long tons; 1,210 short tons) as designed and up to 1,163 t (1,145 long tons; 1,282 short tons) at full load. The ships' hull was divided into ten watertight compartments and a double hull on the bottom side that extended for fifty-five percent of its length.

The ships featured a light iron superstructure that served to make the boats more seaworthy. The section before the gun emplacement served as accommodation for the crew. The aft section served as quarters for the officers and non-commissioned officers. Behind the gun, there was a deckhouse, which gave a dry access to the machinery and the officer's quarters. They had no rigging, only a signals mast. The ships had a crew that consisted of three officers and seventy-three to eighty-five enlisted men. While serving as a flagship, an additional three officers and eight enlisted men for a commander's staff would be added.

Steering was controlled via a single rudder. The ships were very unseaworthy; they rolled violently and the gun could not be operated in sea state 4 or higher. The ships tended to take on large quantities of water, and suffered from weather helm. Maneuverability suffered from unpredictability, and once a turn was begun, it was difficult to change course.

Power was provided by a pair of 2-cylinder double-expansion steam engines that drove a pair of four-bladed screw propellers that were 2.5 m (8 ft 2 in) wide. The engines were placed in a single engine room, though a watertight bulkhead divided them. Four cylindrical fire-tube boilers provided steam to the engines, and they were vented through a single, tall funnel. The propulsion system was rated to produce a top speed of 9 knots (17 km/h; 10 mph) from 800 metric horsepower (790 ihp), though all members of the class exceeded it by more than a knot, with top speeds ranging from 10.4 to 11.2 kn (19.3 to 20.7 km/h; 12.0 to 12.9 mph). The ships carried 40 t (39 long tons; 44 short tons) of coal for the boilers, which provided a cruising radius of 700 nautical miles (1,300 km; 810 mi) at a speed of 7 knots (13 km/h; 8.1 mph). When speed increased to 10 knots, the range fell to 450 nmi (830 km; 520 mi).

=== Armament and armor ===
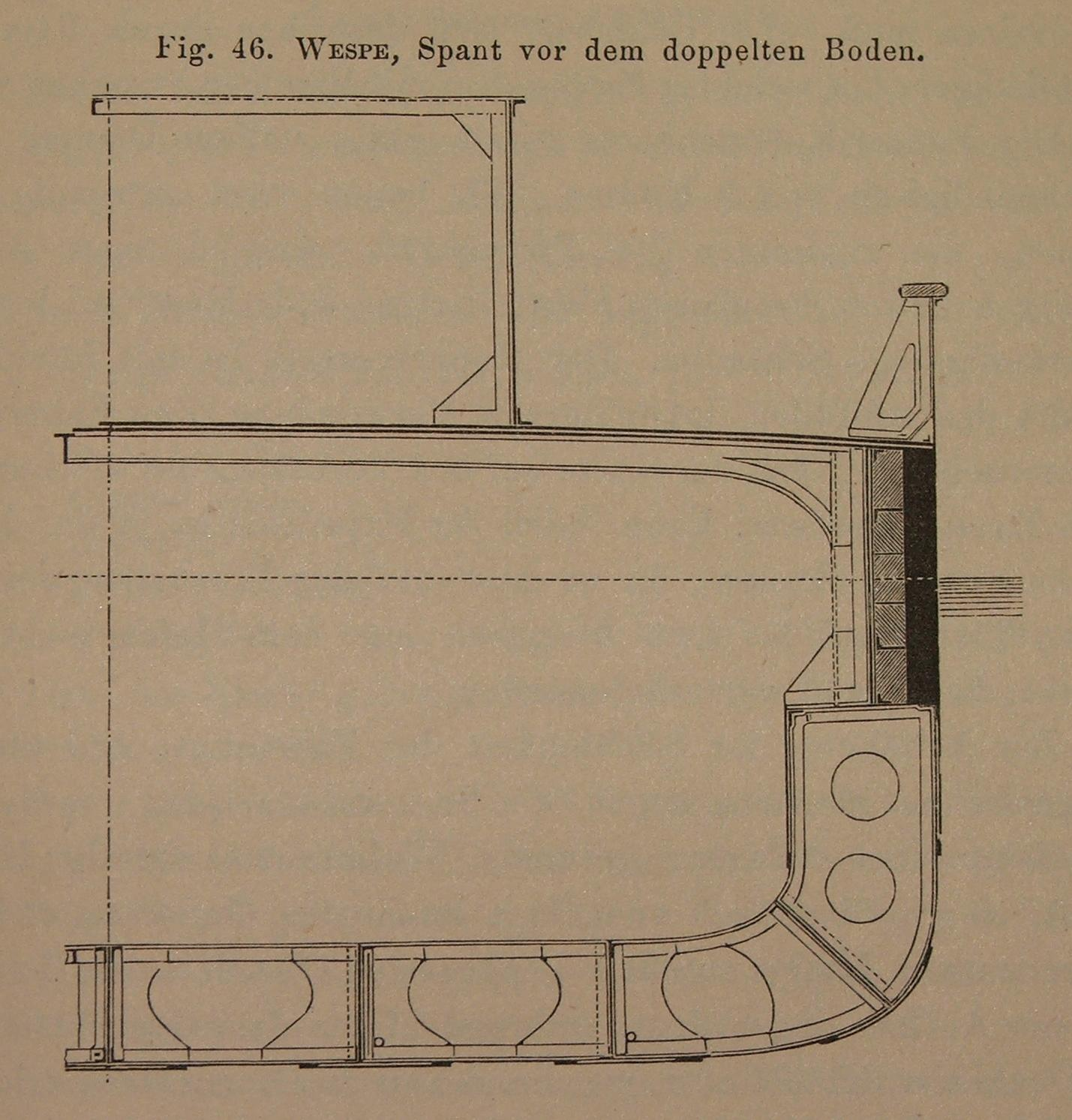
Wespe's armor belt

The Wespes were armed with a 30.5 cm (12 in) MRK L/22 built-up gun on a pivot carriage which put its trunnions 3.7 m (12 ft) above the water. The gun was supplied with a total of thirty-eight shells. It had a range of elevation form -5 degrees to 20 degrees, and a maximum range of 10,000 m (11,000 yd). The gun had a limited arc of train, and aiming was primarily accomplished by turning the ship in the direction of the enemy. Because of their shallow draft and flat bottoms, the Wespe-class ships could be run aground on sandbars along the coast, as semi-fixed coastal artillery batteries. The ships also had a ram bow.

Later in their careers, the Wespes received two 8.7 cm (3.4 in) L/24 built-up guns and two 37 mm (1.5 in) Hotchkiss revolver cannon. They were also fitted with two 35 cm (13.8 in) torpedo tubes in bow-mounted launchers, submerged below the waterline. Each tube carried a single torpedo.

The armor belt was 203 mm (8 in) thick in the central portion. It continued at that same thickness along the whole bow section, but tapered to first to 152 mm (6 in) and then to 102 mm (4 in) at the stern. A layer of teak that was 210 mm (8.3 in) thick backed the belt armor. This was because the Wespes were planned to engage the enemy with their bow forward, instead of with the broadside. The gun was placed behind a semi-circular armored barbette of 203 mm (8 in) thickness, also backed by 210 mm of teak. The deck of the Wespes was protected by two layers of 22 mm (1 in) thick wrought iron atop a layer of 28 mm (1.1 in) teak. Later in their careers, a small, armored conning tower with 20 mm (0.79 in) thick sides was installed atop the superstructure. Other aspects of its protection scheme were compartmentalization and a double hull, which would limit flooding in the event the hull was penetrated.

== Ships ==
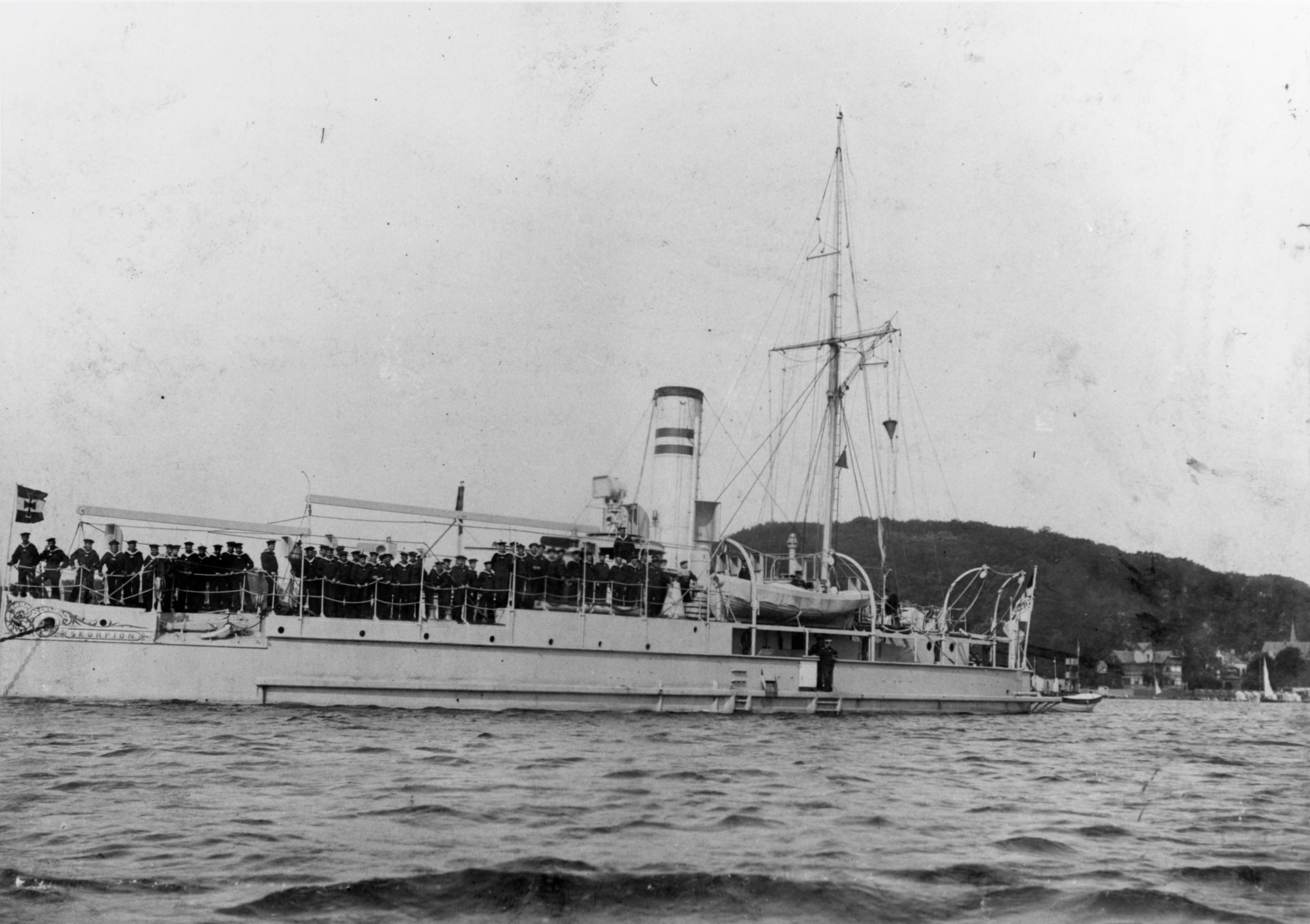
Scorpion in Kiel in the 1890s

Construction data
Name	Builder	Laid down	Launched	Commissioned
Wespe	AG Weser, Bremen	May 1875	6 July 1876	26 November 1876
Viper	AG Weser, Bremen	May 1875	21 September 1876	27 March 1877
Biene	AG Weser, Bremen	1876	2 December 1876	20 August 1877
Mücke	AG Weser, Bremen	1876	5 May 1877	25 February 1878
Scorpion	AG Weser, Bremen	July 1876	17 May 1877	12 December 1877
Basilisk	AG Weser, Bremen	September 1877	1878	20 August 1880
Camaeleon	AG Weser, Bremen	1878	21 December 1878	10 November 1879
Crocodill	AG Weser, Bremen	1878	19 September 1879	20 September 1880
Salamander	AG Weser, Bremen	September 1878	6 January 1880	4 September 1883
Natter	AG Weser, Bremen	July 1879	29 September 1880	20 May 1881
Hummel	AG Weser, Bremen	July 1879	12 February 1881	22 May 1882

== Service history ==
Illustration of Wespe early in her career

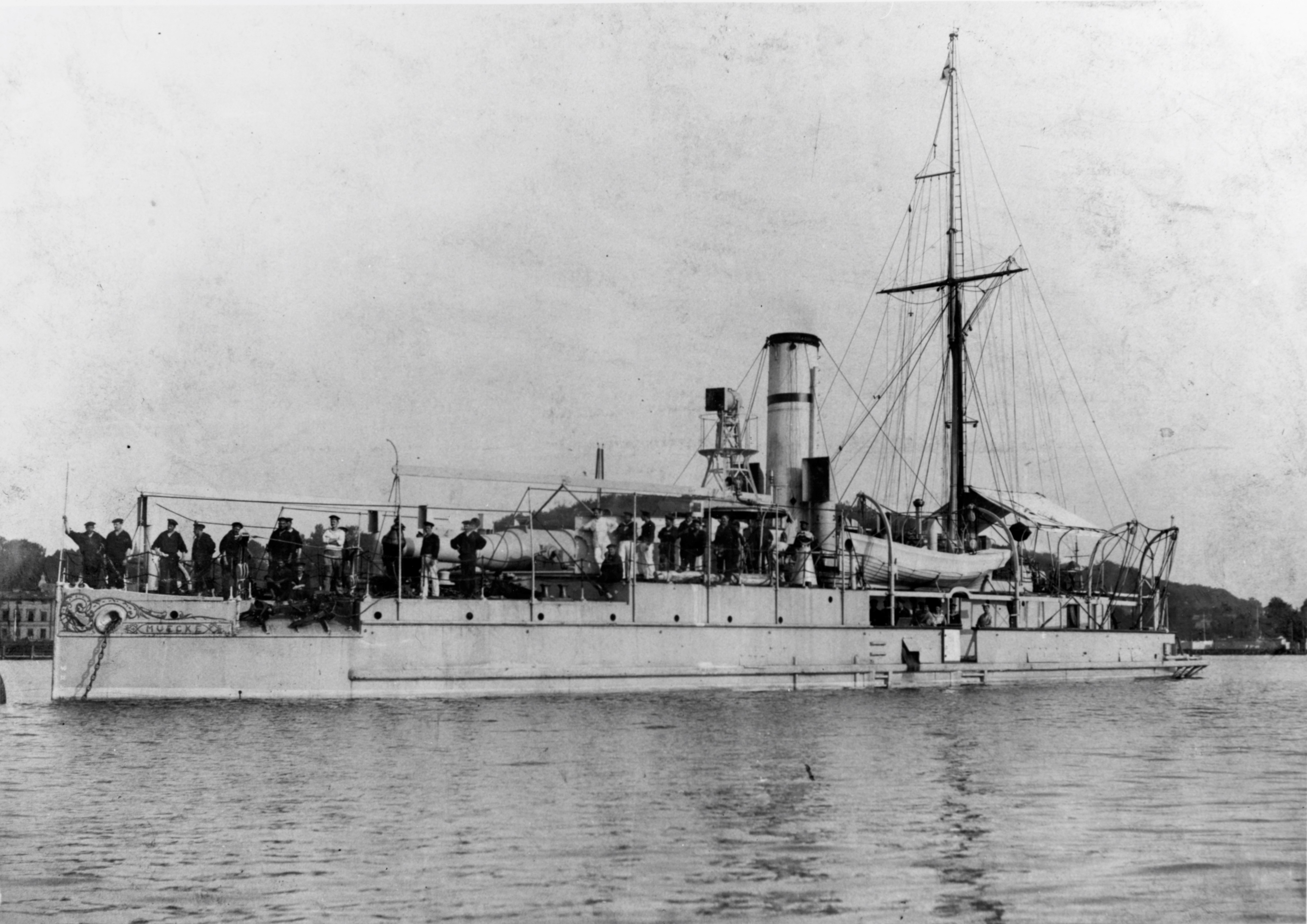
Mücke sometime in the 1880s to 1897

After commissioning in November 1876, Wespe conducted sea trials and test shooting of the 30.5 cm gun, before being placed in reserve in March 1877. The rest of the members of the class also commissioned for sea trials after completing construction, before being placed in reserve for the first few years of their careers. The ships saw intermittent periods of training activity in the 1880s and into the 1890s, though not all ships were active at any one time. Basilisk was the one exception; she was only commissioned very briefly for just two months in 1880 and one month in 1881. In the early 1880s, all members of the class were refitted with the additional guns and torpedo tubes.

In some years, some of the ships were grouped into a flotilla for training maneuvers with other elements of the German fleet. In 1884, for example, Biene, Camaeleon, Crocodill, and Hummel took part in training exercises in the Baltic. The following year, Wespe, Salamander, Viper, and Mücke participated in maneuvers in the North Sea with the screw corvette Stein. Through much of this period, Mücke or Crocodill served as the flagship, both of the temporarily activated flotillas and also the Reserve Division of the Baltic. Mücke, Natter, Crocodill, and Scorpion recommissioned briefly in 1900 due to a shortage of warships in Germany, after several major warships were sent to China in response to the Boxer Uprising; they replaced the four Brandenburg-class battleships in the annual fleet maneuvers that September.

Wespe, Viper, Salamander, and Camaeleon were struck from the naval register on 28 June 1909; Wespe and Camaeleon were used as barges, while Viper was converted into a crane ship. Salamander was instead sold to ship breakers, but she sank off the coast of the Netherlands on the way to the scrapyard in November 1910. Biene, Basilisk, and Hummel were struck on 27 September 1910. Biene was converted into a floating workshop, and Basilisk was used for a time as a test ship for hull leakage experiments. Hummel served in a variety of roles for another thirty years, beginning as a floating workshop. Mücke, Natter, and Crocodill were struck on 18 March 1911. Crocodill was used as a target ship, then as a floating workshop beginning in 1913. Mücke was used in hull leakage tests, and Natter was renamed Stromquelle I (Power Source I) for use as a stoker barge in Wilhelmshaven. Wespe was sold into commercial service and converted into a cutter suction dredger in 1911. In 1918 during World War I, Viper took part in the salvage operation to refloat the dreadnought battleship Rheinland, which had run aground off the coast of Finland.

Crocodill was broken up sometime after 1918. Basilisk was sold to ship breakers in 1919 and dismantled the following year. Biene and Mücke were eventually sold in 1921 and were both broken up that year in Wewelsfleth. Wespe, which had been renamed H.A.M. III, sank in a storm off the coast of Australia in 1926. Stromquelle I was moved to Kiel in 1924 and reverted to the name Natter; she was eventually scrapped there in 1946. Hummel ended her career as a floating anti-aircraft battery during World War II. In that role, she was sunk by Allied bombers on 4 May 1945. Viper remained in service the longest, outlasting even Hummel by more than two decades at least; she remained in active use as a crane vessel at least as late as 1970. After a failed attempt to raise the wreck of Salamander in 1936, her superstructure was removed to reduce the hazard to navigation. A second attempt in 1980 also failed, and the ship eventually became buried in silt. The ultimate fates of Viper and Camaeleon are unknown.
