= SMS Basilisk =

Three ships of the German and Austro-Hungarian navies have been named SMS Basilisk:

- SMS Basilisk (1862), a Prussian gunboat that served during the wars of German unification
- SMS Basilisk (1878), a German armored gunboat
- SMS Basilisk (1902), an Austro-Hungarian minelayer that later served as the Romanian Aurora
