= SMS Hummel =

German ironclad gunboat

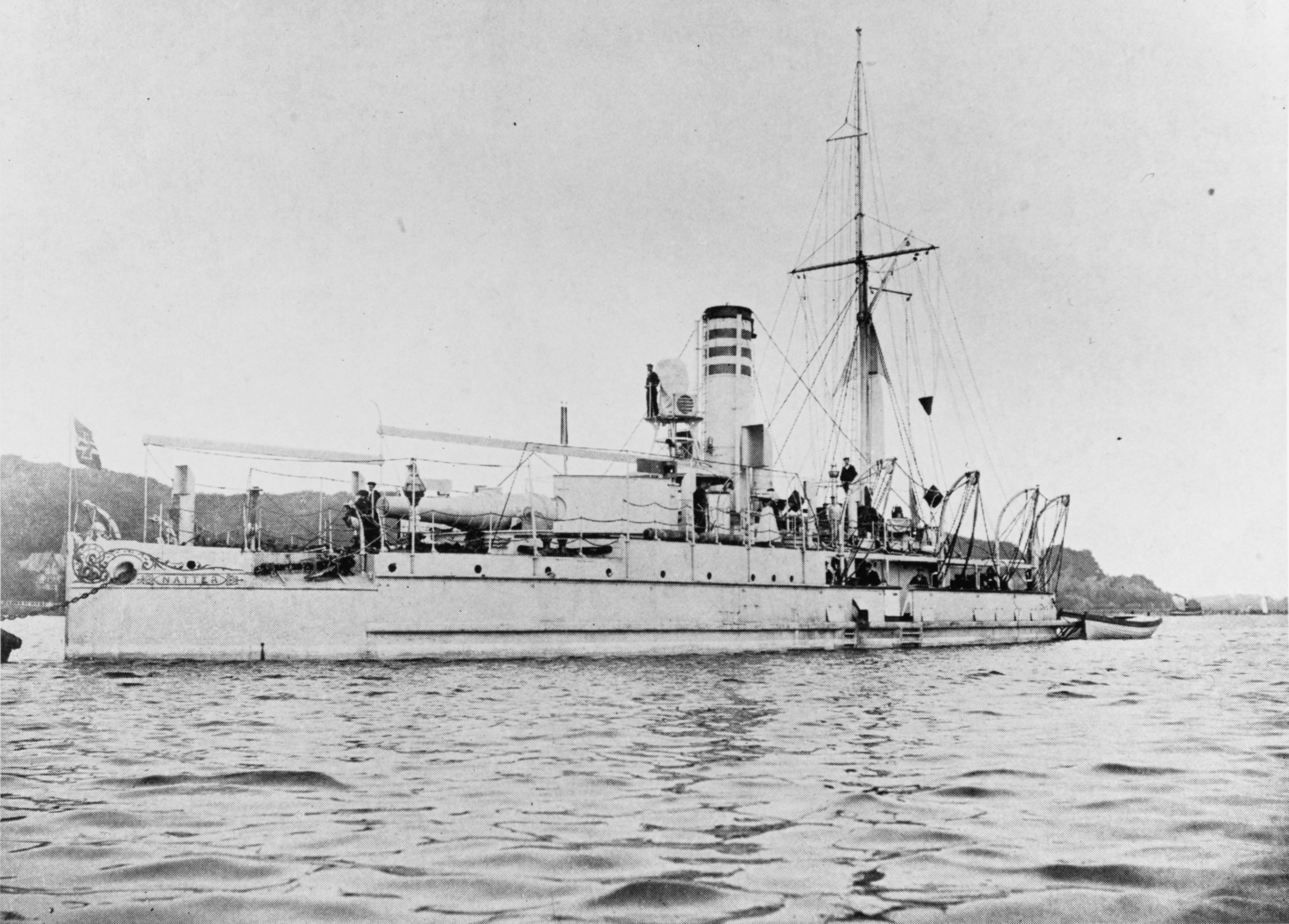
- Hummel's sister ship Natter in Kiel

History
- Name: Hummel
- Namesake: Bumblebee
- Operator: Imperial German Navy
- Builder: AG Weser, Bremen
- Laid down: July 1879
- Launched: 12 February 1881
- Commissioned: 22 May 1882
- Decommissioned: 30 September 1884
- Stricken: 27 September 1910
- Fate: Sunk, 4 May 1945

General characteristics
- Class & type: Wespe-class gunboat
- Displacement: Design: 1,098 t (1,081 long tons); Full load: 1,163 t (1,145 long tons)
- Length: 46.4 m (152 ft 3 in)
- Beam: 10.6 m (34 ft 9 in)
- Draft: 3.2 to 3.4 m (10 ft 6 in to 11 ft 2 in)
- Installed power: 4 × fire-tube boilers; 756 PS (746 ihp)
- Propulsion: 2 × double-expansion steam engines; 2 × screw propellers
- Speed: 11.1 knots (20.6 km/h; 12.8 mph)
- Range: 700 nmi (1,300 km; 810 mi) at 7 knots (13 km/h; 8.1 mph)
- Complement: 3 officers; 73–85 enlisted
- Armament: 1 × 30.5 cm (12 in) MRK L/22 gun
- Armor: Belt: 102 to 203 mm (4 to 8 in); Barbette: 203 mm (8 in); Deck: 44 mm (1.7 in)

SMS Hummel was an ironclad gunboat of the Wespe class built for the German Kaiserliche Marine (Imperial Navy) in the 1870s. The ships, which were armed with a single 30.5 cm (12 in) MRK L/22 gun, were intended to serve as part of a coastal defense fleet. Because Hummel was a purely defensive vessel, she saw little active use, apart from brief stints in active service for sea trials in 1882 and a short training period in 1884. The ship remained in the reserve fleet for the next twenty-five years before being struck from the naval register in 1910. Hummel was used in a variety of subsidiary roles, ending up as a floating anti-aircraft battery during World War II. She was sunk by Allied in May 1945, in the final days of the war.

== Design ==
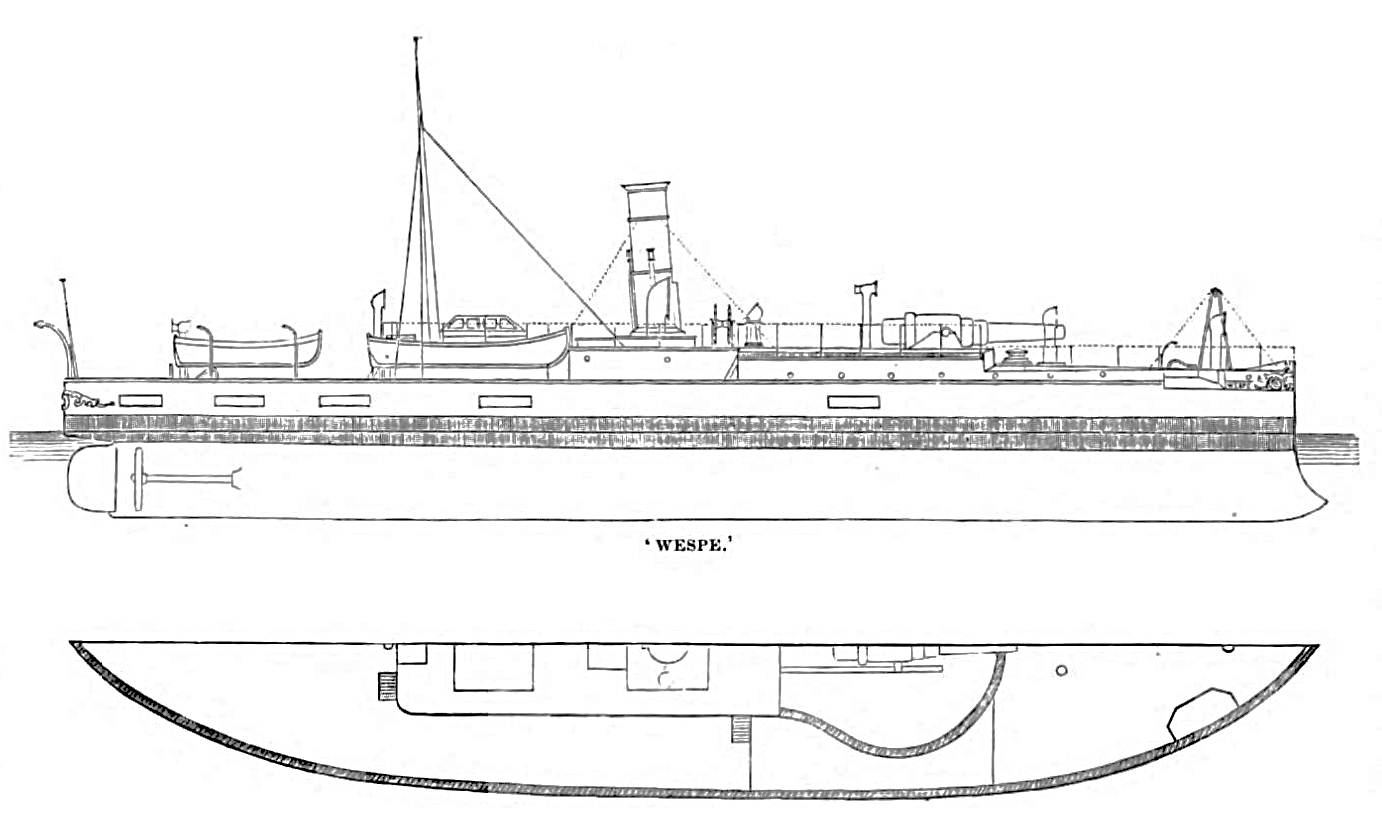
Plan and profile of the Wespe class in their original configuration

Development of the Wespe class of ironclad gunboats began in the 1850s, after the first ironclads were introduced during the Crimean War. Through the 1860s, the Federal Convention examined various proposals, ranging from plans to build eight to as many as eighteen armored warships. The decision was finalized based on the fleet plan conceived by General Albrecht von Stosch, the new Chief of the Kaiserliche Admiralität (Imperial Admiralty), in the early 1870s. He envisioned a fleet oriented on defense of Germany's Baltic and North Sea coasts, which would be led by the ironclad corvettes of the Sachsen class. These were to be supported by larger numbers of small, armored gunboats, which became the Wespe class.

Hummel was 46.4 meters (152 ft 3 in) long overall, with a beam of 10.6 m (34 ft 9 in). The ships of the Wespe class had a draft of 3.2 to 3.4 m (10 to 11 ft). She displaced 1,098 metric tons (1,081 long tons) as designed and increasing to 1,163 t (1,145 long tons) at full load. The ship's crew consisted of 3 officers and 73 to 85 enlisted men. She was powered by a pair of double-expansion steam engines that drove a pair of 4-bladed screw propellers, with steam provided by four coal-fired cylindrical fire-tube boilers, which gave her a top speed of 11.1 knots (20.6 km/h; 12.8 mph) at 756 metric horsepower (746 ihp). At a cruising speed of 7 knots (13 km/h; 8.1 mph), she could steam for 700 nautical miles (1,300 km; 810 mi).

The ship was armed with one 30.5 cm (12 in) MRK L/22 gun in a barbette mount that had a limited arc of traverse. In practice, the gun was aimed by turning the ship in the direction of fire. The Wespes were intended to beach themselves on the sandbars along the German coastline to serve as semi-mobile coastal artillery batteries. The armored barbette was protected by 203 mm (8 in) of wrought iron, backed with 210 mm (8.3 in) of teak. The ship was fitted with a waterline armor belt that was 102 to 203 mm (4 to 8 in) thick, with the thickest section protecting the propulsion machinery spaces and ammunition magazine. The belt was backed with 210 mm of teak. An armor deck that consisted of two layers of 22 mm (0.87 in) of iron on 28 mm (1.1 in) of teak provided additional protection against enemy fire.

== Service history ==
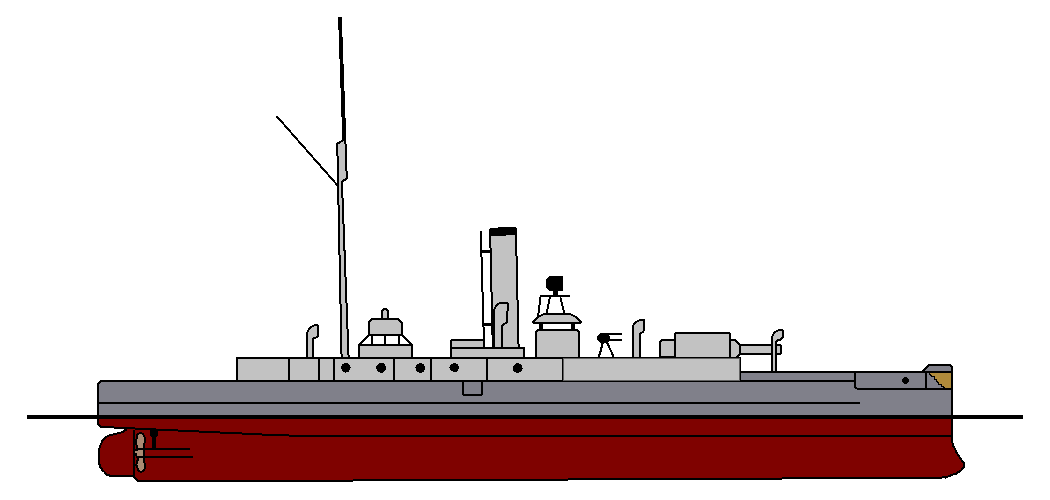
Profile drawing of the Wespe class as they appeared c. 1900

Hummel was built at the AG Weser shipyard in Bremen. Her keel was laid down in July 1879, under the provisional designation "L". (Note: German warships were ordered under provisional names. Additions to the fleet were given a single letter; ships intended to replace older or lost vessels were ordered as "Ersatz (name of the ship to be replaced)".) She was launched on 12 February 1881. The ship was named after the German word for bumblebee. Work on the ship was completed later that year, and she was commissioned into active service on 22 May 1882, the last member of the class to join the fleet. At that time, she was commanded by Kapitänleutnant (KL—Captain Lieutenant) Erich von Dresky. She was moved from Wilhelmshaven to Kiel, where she was decommissioned on 10 June.

By 1883, the ship had been refitted with an additional pair of 8.7 cm (3.4 in) L/24 built-up guns, a pair of 37 mm (1.5 in) Hotchkiss revolver cannon, and two 35 cm (13.8 in) torpedo tubes in her bow, both of which were below the waterline. On 22 April 1884, Hummel recommissioned under the command of KL Max Piraly. She joined the Armored Gunboat Flotilla, which included three of her sister ships and was led by the aviso Grille, the flagship of Kapitän zur See (Captain at Sea) Karl August Deinhard. The ships conducted training exercises in the western Baltic, near the island of Rügen. The ships thereafter participated in the annual fleet exercises with the main units of the German navy in the North Sea. On 30 September, Hummel was decommissioned and placed back in reserve at Kiel.

Hummel saw no further active service, though she remained in the fleet's inventory for another twenty-five years. The ship was struck from the naval register on 27 September 1910 and then converted into a floating workshop. In 1923, she was reduced to a storage hulk based in Swinemünde. During World War II, she was converted into a stationary anti-aircraft battery, still stationed in Swinemünde. She was eventually sunk there on 4 May 1945 by an Allied bombing raid, in the final days of the conflict.
