= SMS Natter (1880) =

German ironclad gunboat

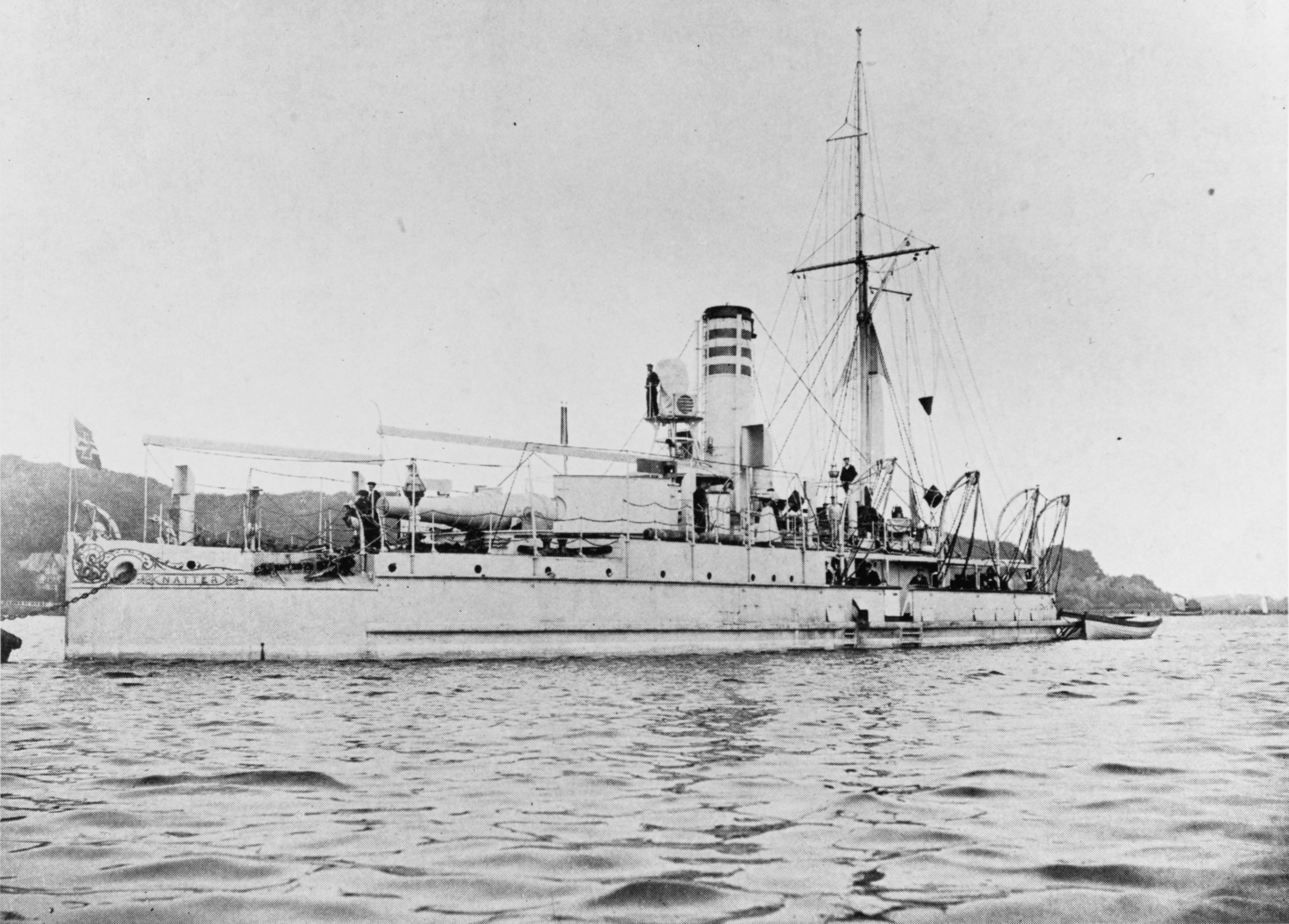
- Natter in Kiel

History
- Name: Natter
- Namesake: SMS Natter
- Operator: Imperial German Navy
- Builder: AG Weser, Bremen
- Laid down: July 1879
- Launched: 29 September 1880
- Commissioned: 20 May 1881
- Decommissioned: 24 September 1900
- Stricken: 18 March 1911
- Fate: Broken up, 1946

General characteristics
- Class & type: Wespe-class gunboat
- Displacement: Design: 1,098 t (1,081 long tons); Full load: 1,163 t (1,145 long tons)
- Length: 46.4 m (152 ft 3 in)
- Beam: 10.6 m (34 ft 9 in)
- Draft: 3.2 to 3.4 m (10 ft 6 in to 11 ft 2 in)
- Installed power: 4 × fire-tube boilers; 756 PS (746 ihp)
- Propulsion: 2 × double-expansion steam engines; 2 × screw propellers
- Speed: 11.1 knots (20.6 km/h; 12.8 mph)
- Range: 700 nmi (1,300 km; 810 mi) at 7 knots (13 km/h; 8.1 mph)
- Complement: 3 officers; 73–85 enlisted
- Armament: 1 × 30.5 cm (12 in) MRK L/22 gun
- Armor: Belt: 102 to 203 mm (4 to 8 in); Barbette: 203 mm (8 in); Deck: 44 mm (1.7 in)

SMS Natter was an ironclad gunboat of the Wespe class built for the German Kaiserliche Marine (Imperial Navy) in the late 1870s and early 1880s. The ships, which were armed with a single 30.5 cm (12 in) MRK L/22 gun, were intended to serve as part of a coastal defense fleet. Because Natter was a purely defensive vessel, she saw little active use, apart from brief stints in active service for sea trials after she was completed in 1881, followed by short training exercises in 1884 and then annually from 1894 to 1900. Natter was struck from the naval register in 1911, renamed Stromquelle I and stationed in Wilhelmshaven. She was renamed Natter in 1924 and used as a training ship through 1945. The ship was eventually broken up in 1946.

== Design ==
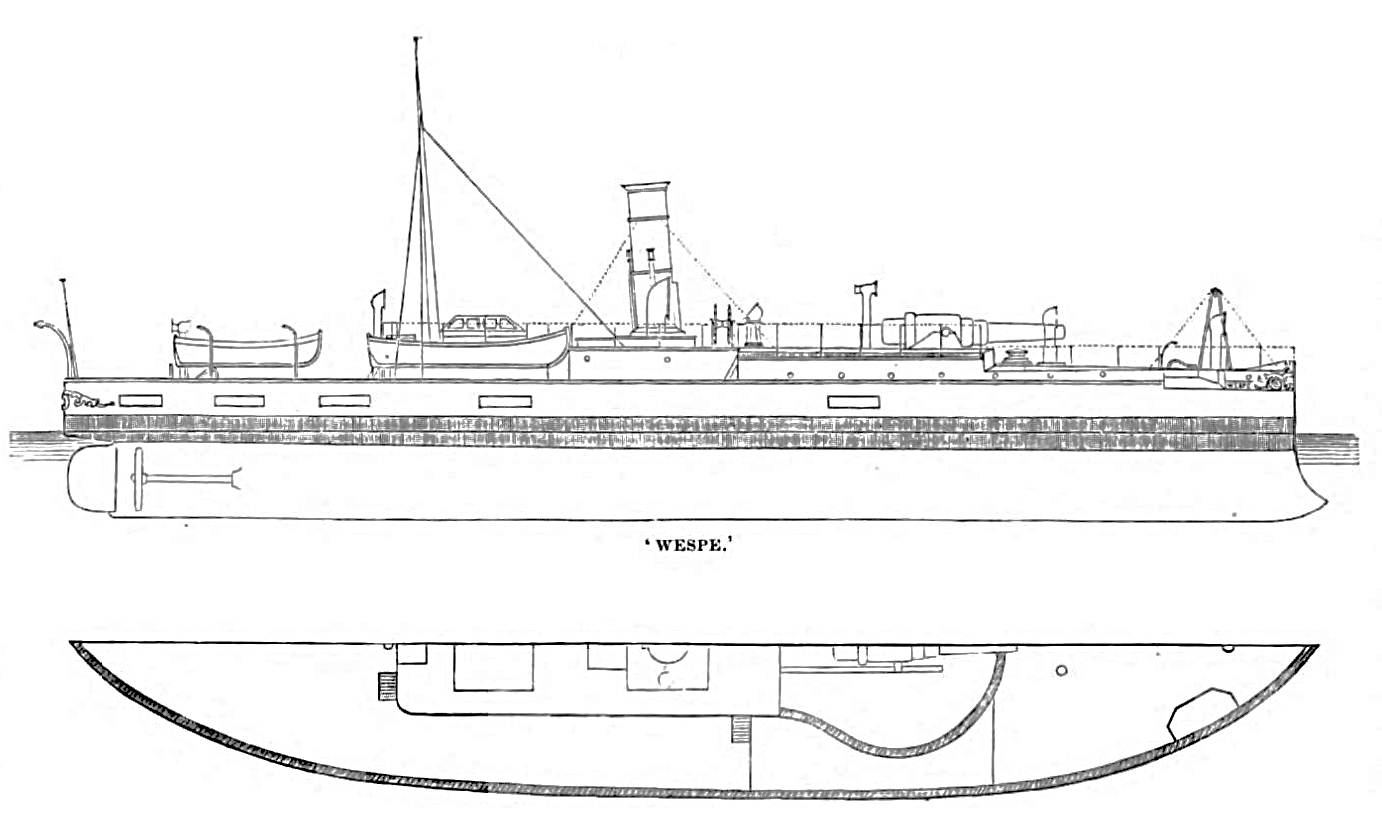
Plan and profile of the Wespe class in their original configuration

Development of the Wespe class of ironclad gunboats began in the 1850s, after the first ironclads were introduced during the Crimean War. Through the 1860s, the Federal Convention examined various proposals, ranging from plans to build eight to as many as eighteen armored warships. The decision was finalized based on the fleet plan conceived by General Albrecht von Stosch, the new Chief of the Kaiserliche Admiralität (Imperial Admiralty), in the early 1870s. He envisioned a fleet oriented on defense of Germany's Baltic and North Sea coasts, which would be led by the ironclad corvettes of the Sachsen class. These were to be supported by larger numbers of small, armored gunboats, which became the Wespe class.

Natter was 46.4 meters (152 ft 3 in) long overall, with a beam of 10.6 m (34 ft 9 in). The ships of the Wespe class had a draft of 3.2 to 3.4 m (10 to 11 ft). She displaced 1,098 metric tons (1,081 long tons) as designed and increasing to 1,163 t (1,145 long tons) at full load. The ship's crew consisted of 3 officers and 73 to 85 enlisted men. She was powered by a pair of double-expansion steam engines that drove a pair of 4-bladed screw propellers, with steam provided by four coal-fired cylindrical fire-tube boilers, which gave her a top speed of 11.1 knots (20.6 km/h; 12.8 mph) at 756 metric horsepower (746 ihp). At a cruising speed of 7 knots (13 km/h; 8.1 mph), she could steam for 700 nautical miles (1,300 km; 810 mi).

The ship was armed with one 30.5 cm (12 in) MRK L/22 gun in a barbette mount that had a limited arc of traverse. In practice, the gun was aimed by turning the ship in the direction of fire. The Wespes were intended to beach themselves on the sandbars along the German coastline to serve as semi-mobile coastal artillery batteries. The armored barbette was protected by 203 mm (8 in) of wrought iron, backed with 210 mm (8.3 in) of teak. The ship was fitted with a waterline armor belt that was 102 to 203 mm (4 to 8 in) thick, with the thickest section protecting the propulsion machinery spaces and ammunition magazine. The belt was backed with 210 mm of teak. An armor deck that consisted of two layers of 22 mm (0.87 in) of iron on 28 mm (1.1 in) of teak provided additional protection against enemy fire.

== Service history ==
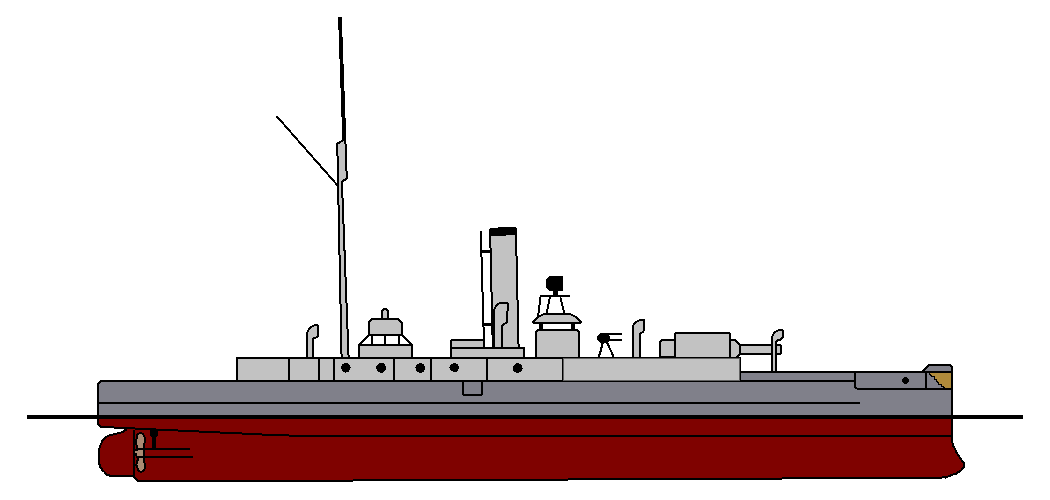
Profile drawing of the Wespe class as they appeared c. 1900

The keel for Natter was laid down at the AG Weser shipyard in Bremen in July 1879, under the provisional designation "K". (Note: German warships were ordered under provisional names. Additions to the fleet were given a single letter; ships intended to replace older or lost vessels were ordered as "Ersatz (name of the ship to be replaced)".) The ship was launched on 29 September 1880. The ship was named after the earlier, wooden gunboat Natter. Work on the ship was completed the following year, and she was commissioned into active service on 20 May for sea trials. She was then placed in reserve, assigned to the Marinestation der Nordsee (North Sea Naval Station) based in Wilhelmshaven.

Natter was commissioned for her first proper period of active service on 15 June 1884 to replace her sister ship Biene, which had suffered machinery breakdown and would not be available for the upcoming training exercises. The crew from Biene were sent to Wilhelmshaven to activate Natter, and she got underway on 19 June, bound for the Baltic Sea. She arrived in Danzig Bay on 26 June, where she joined several of her other sisters in the Armored Gunboat Flotilla, which was serving with the Maneuver Fleet. The ships conducted various training exercises over the following three months, and on 30 September, Natter was decommissioned at Kiel. On 25 November, she was officially transferred to the Marinestation der Ostsee (Baltic Sea).

The ship remained out of service for the next decade, and in the early 1890s, she was modernized. The work included the installation of a pair of 8.7 cm (3.4 in) L/24 built-up guns, a pair of 37 mm (1.5 in) Hotchkiss revolver cannon, and two 35 cm (13.8 in) torpedo tubes in her bow, both of which were below the waterline. Natter next recommissioned on 2 October 1894, and she was assigned to the Armored Gunboat Reserve Division, based in Danzig. The unit only remained in existence for another ten days before being disbanded, and Natter was allocated to the Danzig Reserve Division. On 1 May 1895, she became the flagship of the deputy commander of the division; the same day, she came under the command of Kapitänleutnant (KL—Captain Lieutenant) Maximilian von Spee. Natter and the divisional flagship, her sister Mücke, participated in training exercises with the rest of the fleet. On 19 September, Natter was decommissioned for the winter, but returned to service on 28 May 1896, now under the command of KL Friedrich Musculus. As in the previous year, Natter and Mücke took part in routine training maneuvers with the rest of the fleet. She was once again decommissioned for the winter months on 23 September.

Natter was recommissioned on 1 April 1897, for another period of training with the fleet. This year, the entire Reserve Division was activated, unlike the last two years. Following the end of the autumn exercises, Natter was placed back out of commission on 1 October. KL Gustav Kirchhoff took command of the ship when she was recommissioned on 1 April 1898. That year, Natter, Mücke, and their sister Scorpion exercised off the coast of East Prussia over the summer, and in July, KL Otto Philipp replaced Kirchhoff as the ship's captain. The three gunboats later joined the rest of the fleet for the annual maneuvers. Natter was decommissioned on 27 September. The 1899 training year, which lasted from 1 April to 28 September for Natter, followed the same pattern as 1898, including exercises with Mücke and Scorpion. During this period, in May, KL Maximilian Rogge became the ship's captain, though he remained in the post just through July.

On 3 April 1900, Natter recommissioned for the last time, once again under the command of Rogge. On 16 June, she and Scorpion represented the German fleet at the opening of the Elbe–Lübeck Canal, which was officiated by Kaiser Wilhelm II. Natter joined the Armored Gunboat Division for the annual fleet maneuvers in August and September, after which she was decommissioned for the last time on 24 September. On 18 March 1911, Natter was struck from the naval register. She was renamed Stromquelle I (Power Source I) and based in Wilhelmshaven, where she served as a floating powerplant. In 1924, she was moved to Kiel, where she reverted to her original name in 1928. She was eventually wrecked at Kiel–Mönkeberg in 1946.
