= Wewelsfleth =

- Municipality
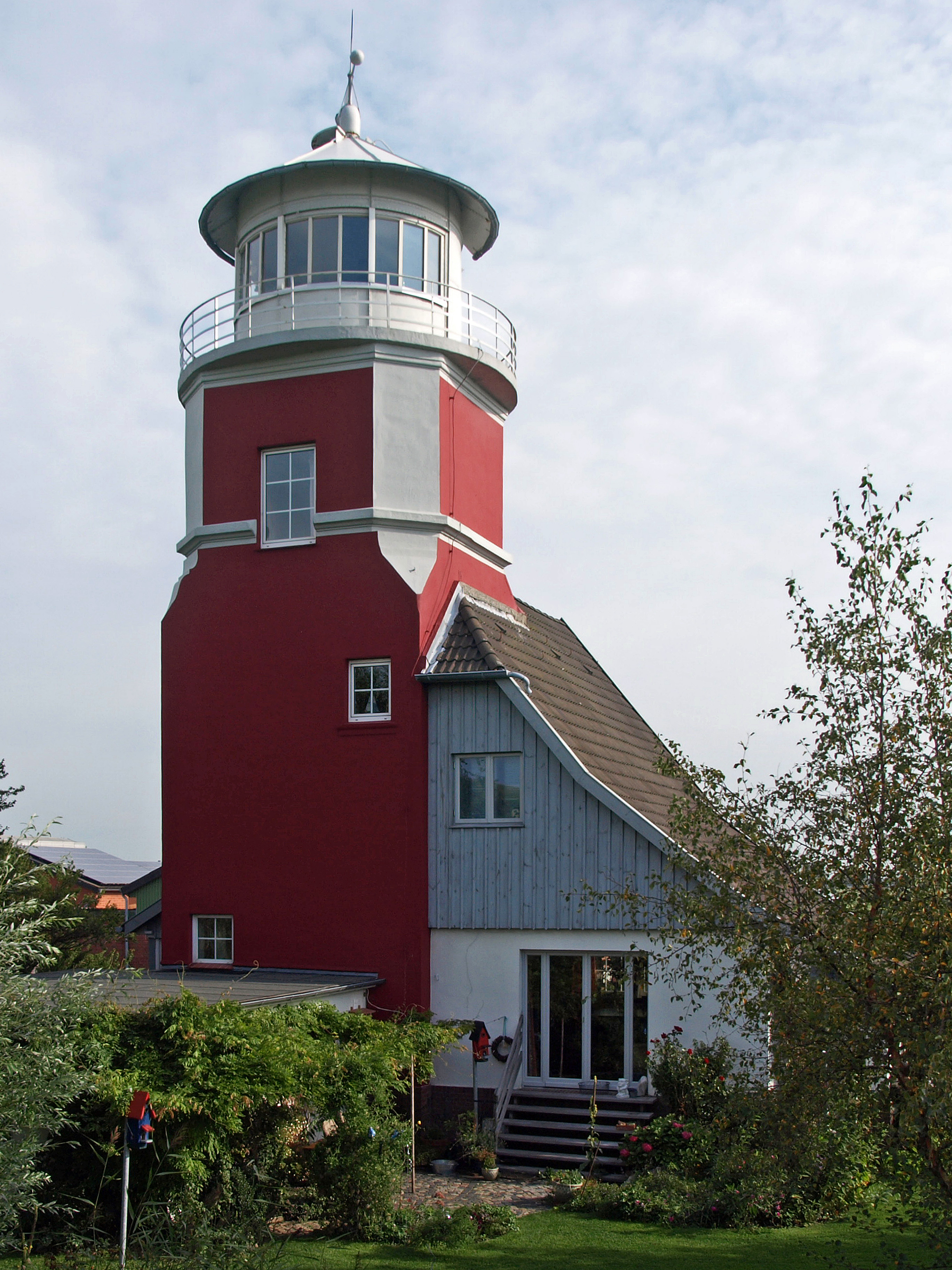

- Coat of arms

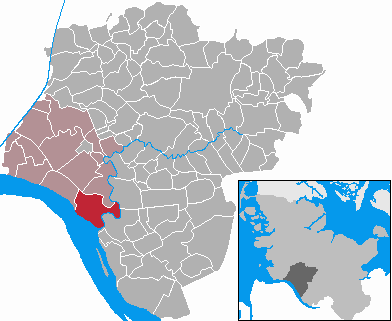
- Location of Wewelsfleth within Steinburg district
- Interactive map of Wewelsfleth
- Location within Germany Location within Schleswig-Holstein
- Coordinates: 53°50′38″N 9°24′5″E
- Country: Germany
- State: Schleswig-Holstein
- District: Steinburg
- Municipal assoc.: Wilstermarsch
- Subdivisions: 8

Government
  - Mayor: Delf Bolten

Area
  - Total: 24.54 km^{2} (9.47 sq mi)
- Elevation: 1 m (3.3 ft)

Population (2025-12-31)
  - Total: 1,337
  - Density: 54.48/km^{2} (141.1/sq mi)
- Time zone: UTC+01:00 (CET)
  - Summer (DST): UTC+02:00 (CEST)
- Postal codes: 25599
- Dialling codes: 04829
- Vehicle registration: IZ
- Website: www.wilstermarsch.de

Wewelsfleth is a municipality in the district of Steinburg, in Schleswig-Holstein, Germany.
