= German Imperial Admiralty =

Imperial naval authority of Imperial German Navy (1872-89)

Flag Chef der Admiralität

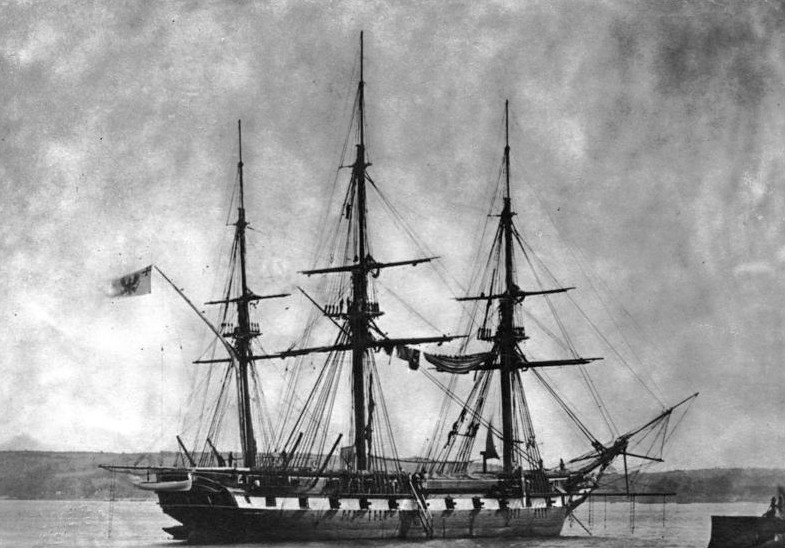
Prussian warship, circa 1867

The German Imperial Admiralty (German: Kaiserliche Admiralität) was an imperial naval authority in the German Empire. By order of Kaiser Wilhelm I the Northern German Federal Navy Department of the North German Confederation (1866–71), which had been formed from the Prussian Navy Department (Marineministerium), became on 1 January 1872 the German Imperial Admiralty (Kaiserliche Admiralität). The head of the Admiralty (Chef der Admiralität) administered the Imperial Navy under the authority of the imperial chancellor and the supreme command of the Emperor (Kaiserliche Kommandogewalt). It lasted until 1889, undergoing several reorganizations, but proved an impractical arrangement given the constant growth and the expansion of the Imperial Navy. Finally it was abolished in April 1889 and its duties divided among three new entities: German Imperial Naval High Command (Kaiserliches Oberkommando der Marine), the Imperial Naval Office (Reichsmarineamt), and the Imperial Naval Cabinet (Kaiserliches Marinekabinett). The Imperial Naval High Command was, on 14 March 1899, replaced by the German Imperial Admiralty Staff, which simply transferred over most of the personnel of the Admiral Staff detachment of the former Naval High Command.

== Heads of the Admiralty (Chef der Admiralität) ==
No.	Portrait	Head of the Admiralty	Took office	Left office	Time in office
1	Albrecht von Stosch	Admiral; Albrecht von Stosch (1818–1896)	1 January 1872	20 March 1883	11 years, 78 days
2	Leo von Caprivi	Vize Admiral; Leo von Caprivi (1831–1899)	20 March 1883	5 July 1888	5 years, 107 days
3	Alexander von Monts	Vize Admiral; Alexander von Monts (1832–1889)	5 July 1888	19 January 1889	198 days
