= Albrecht von Stosch =

German general (1818–1896)

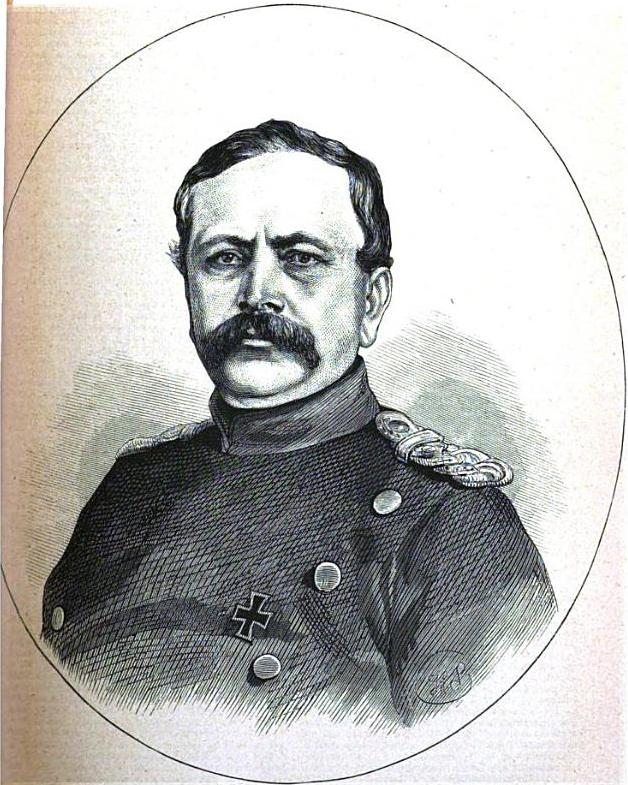
- Portrait of Stosch (1873)
- Born: 20 April 1818; Koblenz, Kingdom of Prussia
- Died: 29 February 1896 (aged 77); Oestrich, German Empire
- Military career
- Allegiance: Prussia; German Confederation; North German Confederation; German Empire
- Branch: Prussian Army; Imperial German Navy
- Service years: 1829–1889
- Rank: General of Infantry; Admiral
- Commands: German Imperial Admiralty
- Conflicts: Austro-Prussian War; Franco-Prussian War

Albrecht von Stosch (20 April 1818 – 29 February 1896) was a German general and admiral who served as first chief of the newly created Imperial German Navy from 1872 to 1883.

== Life ==
Born in Koblenz, he was a cousin of Hans Stosch-Sarrasani, the founder of the Circus Sarrasani. He was the third son of Prussian general Hermann Ferdinand Stosch, who was a traditional military man who had a nationalistic feelings. Just like his father, Stosch was conscious of the tradition of duty and service, and Prussian military heritage was a strong political opinion of his.

After being educated in state schools and a gymnasium, in 1829 Stosch was admitted to the Cadet corps. In 1835 Stosch, aged seventeen, was appointed as second-lieutenant in the Prussian Army. He eventually became a General Staff officer.

Stosch participated in the Austro-Prussian War as Oberquartiermeister of the Second Army.

After the Franco-Prussian War, Stosch was also appointed as an admiral and first chief of the Admiralty and thus of the fledgling Imperial German Navy. He was acknowledged by Wilhelm I for his loyal service to the country. Stosch considered himself as a reformer. He held the rank of General of the Infantry.

Stosch died in Rheingau. There is an island in Chile named after him, Isla Stosch.

== Honours ==
- Kingdom of Prussia:
  - Knight of the Royal Order of the Crown, 2nd Class, 23 September 1865
  - Pour le Mérite (military), 20 September 1866
  - Commander's Cross of the Royal House Order of Hohenzollern, with Swords, 16 June 1871
  - Grand Cross of the Order of the Red Eagle, with Oak Leaves, 18 January 1878
  - Knight of the Order of the Black Eagle, 17 September 1881; with Collar, 1882
- Grand Duchy of Hesse: Commander of the Ludwig Order, 1st Class, 15 March 1868
- Kingdom of Saxony:
  - Grand Cross of the Albert Order, 1867
  - Grand Cross of the Order of Merit, with War Decoration, 1871
- Württemberg: Grand Cross of the Military Merit Order, 2 January 1871
- Sweden-Norway: Grand Cross of the Royal Norwegian Order of Saint Olav, 1 June 1875
