= SMS Hansa =

Three German ships have been named SMS Hansa.

- German warship Hansa, a paddle-wheeled steamer built in the United States in 1847–1848, operated by the German Federal fleet
- SMS Hansa (1872), an ironclad warship
- SMS Hansa (1898), a protected cruiser

== See also ==
- SS Hansa, several civilian ships of the same name
- German auxiliary cruiser Hansa (aka HSK 5(II), Schiff 5), a World War II German Kriegsmarine training ship, a merchant ship completed as a commerce raider
- Hansa (disambiguation)
