= Bayern (disambiguation) =

Bayern is the German name for Bavaria, one of the 16 states of Germany.

Bayern may also refer to:

- Kingdom of Bavaria (Königreich Bayern), a state existing from 1806 to 1918
  - Electorate of Bavaria (Kurfürstentum Bayern), an independent hereditary electorate existing from 1623 to 1806
- FC Bayern Munich, the professional football team operated by a Munich-based sports club of the same name
  - Other teams operated by the FC Bayern Munich sports club:
    - FC Bayern Munich II, the reserve team for the professional football team
    - Bayern Munich Junior Team, the youth academy for the professional football team
    - FC Bayern Munich (women), women's football
    - FC Bayern Munich (basketball), men's basketball
- Bayern (horse), a race horse, winner of the 2014 Breeders' Cup Classic
- "Bayern" (song), by Die Toten Hosen
- Bayern, a fictional kingdom and the setting for the Books of Bayern fantasy series by author Shannon Hale
- Friedrich Bayern (1817–1886), Caucasus archaeologist

Several naval ships of Germany:

- Bayern-class battleship
- SMS Bayern, an ironclad launched 1878
- SMS Bayern, a battleship launched 1915
- Bayern (D183), a destroyer
- Bayern (F217), a frigate
