= Hansa =

Hansa may refer to:

== Places ==
- Hansa (shopping centre), in Turku, Finland
- Hansa-Park, a German attraction park
- 480 Hansa, a main-belt asteroid, a minor planet orbiting the Sun

== Transportation ==
=== Ships ===
- Hansa, a schooner, the research ship of the Second German North Polar Expedition
- Hansa Carrier, a container ship, the recovery of whose lost cargo of uniquely numbered Nike shoes provided research into North Pacific Ocean currents
- German auxiliary cruiser Hansa, a German auxiliary cruiser used in World War II
- SMS Hansa, a German Imperial navy ship name
  - SMS Hansa (1872), a German armored corvette
  - SMS Hansa (1898), a German protected cruiser
- SS Hansa, several steamships of the name
  - SS Albert Ballin, a German transatlantic passenger liner renamed Hansa in 1935 because Ballin had been Jewish
  - SS Hansa (1899), a Swedish passenger liner, sunk by a Soviet submarine in 1944

=== Others ===
- Hansa (airship), or Zeppelin LZ13, a German airship
- Hansa (car), a German car brand of the Borgward group
- HFB 320 Hansa Jet, a German business jet
- Hansa Bai, 15th century Queen of Mewar

== Organizations ==
- Hanseatic League, a 13th–17th century alliance of European trading cities
- Hansa Brewery, a Norwegian brewery merged to form Hansa Borg Bryggerier
- Hansa Records, a record label based in Germany
- Hansa Tonstudio, a recording studio in Berlin, Germany
- Hansa Rostock, a German football (soccer) club
- Lufthansa, a German airline company
- Lüneburger SK Hansa, a German football (soccer) club
- DDG Hansa, a former German shipping company
- Hansa (market), a former darknet market
- Hansa Chippers, a woodchipper manufacturer based in New Zealand

== Other uses ==
- Hansa, a synonym for Metrocles (skipper), a genus of butterflies
- Hansa (film), a 2012 Hindi film directed by Manav Kaul
- Hansa Bird, or Hamsa, a swan or goose used as a symbol and decorative element in India
- Hansa Session, a 2018 album by Scottish synth-pop band Chvrches.
- Hansa Yellow, a yellow pigment used in paints
- Hansa, an Earth-based trade organization that governs much of human civilization in Kevin J. Anderson's The Saga of Seven Suns science fiction series
- Hansa Parekh, a character in the Khichdi franchise

== See also ==
- Khansa (disambiguation)
- Hamsa (disambiguation)
