= Hamza (disambiguation) =

Hamza (Arabic: همزة, hamzah) is a letter in the Arabic alphabet, representing the glottal stop.

Hamza (Arabic: همزة) and Ḥamza (Arabic: حمزة) may also refer to:

== People ==
- Hamza (name), includes a list of people with the given name or surname Hamza

== Places ==
- Hamza (district), a city district of Tashkent, capital of Uzbekistan
- Hamza, Iran, a village in Kerman Province, Iran
- Hamza, Iraq, (Al-Hamzah) a village in Qadisiyah Province, Iraq
- Hamza River, a large aquifer that roughly follows the course of the Amazon River in Brazil
- Hamza Stone, black colored antic rock at the Giresun Adası
- Hamza station, former name of Novza station on the Chilonzor Line of the Tashkent Metro
- Tala Hamza, town in northern Algeria

== Other uses ==
- Hamza (cicada), a genus of insects in the family Cicadidae
- Hamzanama, or Story of Hamza, a 16th-century book relating the story of Hamza ibn Abdul-Muttalib, the uncle of prophet Muhammad
- Hamza Ali Mazari, protagonist of the 2025 Indian film Dhurandhar, portrayed by Ranveer Singh
- Thymelicus hamza, a butterfly of the family Hesperiidae

== See also ==
- Hamsa (disambiguation)
