= Khansa (disambiguation) =

al-Khansa was a 7th-century female Arabic poet.

Khansa(a) may also refer to:

- al-Khansaa (magazine), a women's online magazines published by al-Qaeda
- al-Khansaa Brigade, an all-women police force of the jihadist Islamic State of Iraq and the Levant
- Khansa (crater), a crater on Mercury
- Khansá, a medieval Arabic name for Hangzhou

== See also ==
- Khamsa (disambiguation)
- Hansa (disambiguation)
- Kansa (disambiguation)
