= Bremse (ship) =

Several naval ships of Germany were named Bremse after the horse-fly (German: Bremse):

- SMS Bremse (1884), an armoured gunboat
- SMS Bremse (1916), a Brummer-class cruiser
- German training ship Bremse
- German minesweeper Bremse, a Minensuchboot 1935-class minesweeper
- Bremse-class service ships of the East German Volksmarine
