= Kansa =

Kansa may refer to:

- Kaw people or Kansa, a Native American tribe in Oklahoma and parts of Kansas
  - Kansa language, a Siouan-Catawban language of the Dhegihan group once spoken by the Kaw people
- Kansa or Kamsa, a character in Hindu mythology, the ruler of Mathura and uncle of Krishna
- Tapani Kansa (1949–2025), a Finnish singer
- Kansa, Bangladesh, a village in Jhalakati District
- Kansa method, a method for the solution of partial differential equations

== See also ==
- Khansa (disambiguation)
- Kamsa (disambiguation)
