= Brummer (ship) =

Several naval ships of Germany were named Brummer after the blow-fly:

- SMS Brummer (1884): an armoured gunboat
- SMS Brummer (1915): a 4,400-ton Brummer-class mine-laying cruiser
- German training ship Brummer: an auxiliary gunnery training ship, launched 29 May 1935, commissioned 8 February 1936, sunk 15 April 1940
- German minelayer Brummer: a minelayer, former Norwegian HNoMS Olav Tryggvason, captured 9 April 1940
