= Hamsa (disambiguation) =

Hamsa is a Near Eastern symbol often used as a protective amulet.

Hamsa or may also refer to:

- Hamsa (bird) or Hansa, bird mentioned in ancient Indian literature
- Hamsa (literature) or Khamsa, set of Persian poems by Nizami Ganjavi
- Hamsa (musical group) (חמסה), an Israeli musical quintet
- Ali Hamsa (1955-2022), Malaysian politician
- M. Hamsa (born 1955), Indian politician
- A subsidiary Purana in Hinduism
- A mantra, see Soham (Sanskrit) § Hamsa

== See also ==
- Hamza (disambiguation) (Arabic-language diacritical marking)
- Hansa (disambiguation)
- Hamza (disambiguation)
- Khamsa (disambiguation)
