= Brummer-class gunboat =

German ironclad gunboat

- Brummer

Class overview
- Preceded by: SMS Hay
- Succeeded by: SMS Eber
- Built: 1883–1884
- In commission: 1884–1907
- Completed: 2

General characteristics
- Type: Gunboat
- Displacement: Design: 867 t (853 long tons); Full load: 929 t (914 long tons)
- Length: 64.8 m (212 ft 7 in)
- Beam: 8.5 m (27 ft 11 in)
- Draft: 2.68 to 4.77 m (8 ft 10 in to 15 ft 8 in)
- Installed power: 2 × fire-tube boilers; 1,658 PS (1,635 ihp)
- Propulsion: 2 × double-expansion steam engines; 1 × screw propeller
- Speed: 14.1 knots (26.1 km/h; 16.2 mph)
- Range: 1,370 nautical miles (2,540 km; 1,580 mi) at 10 knots (19 km/h; 12 mph)
- Complement: 3–5 officers; 62–73 enlisted men
- Armament: 1 × 21 cm (8.3 in) gun; 1 × 8.7 cm (3.4 in) gun; 2 × 37 mm (1.5 in) Hotchkiss revolver cannon; 1 × 35 cm (13.8 in) torpedo tube
- Armor: Barbette: 200 mm (7.9 in); Deck: 25–40 mm (0.98–1.57 in)

The Brummer class was a pair of armored gunboats built for the German Kaiserliche Marine (Imperial Navy) in the 1880s. The class comprised Brummer and Bremse. The ship was ordered to serve in Germany's coastal defense system alongside the Sachsen-class ironclads and Wespe-class gunboats. They were significantly less well armed and protected compared to the Wespes, but they were lighter and faster vessels. They also introduced compound armor to the German fleet.

Both ships spent most of their careers in the reserve fleet, though Brummer saw more active service than Bremse. The former initially served as the flagship for a division of torpedo boats in the mid-1880s, and beginning in 1892, she was assigned to the gunnery training school. Bremse was only activated in 1891, 1893, and 1902 for fisheries protection patrols, a task Brummer also performed at times between the mid-1890s and mid-1900s. Bremse was reduced to a hulk in 1903 and sold into civilian service in 1910, but Brummer remained in the fleet's inventory, also as a hulk, until after World War I. She was broken up in 1922.

== Design ==
In the mid-1879s, the German Kaiserliche Marine (Imperial Navy) began a program to strengthen its coastal defense forces, beginning with the four Sachsen-class ironclads. Late in the decade, the navy ordered eleven Wespe-class gunboats, which were intended to support the operations of the Sachsens. The Wespes carried a single 30.5 cm (12 in) gun in a fixed mount, with very heavy armor protection. They were intended to beach themselves on the sandbars along the German coastline to serve as semi-mobile coastal artillery batteries. The construction program called for additional ships of both types to be built in the early 1880s, but all of these ships proved to be controversial when they entered service for a variety of reasons. The Wespes were too heavy and slow to be effective warships, and they rolled so badly their gun could be aimed only with great difficulty. And the timing of their construction proved to be unfortunate; they used heavy wrought iron armor just as compound armor was being developed.

Design work began on a successor design to the Wespe class in the early 1880s that would correct their many deficiencies and was completed in 1883. The new ships incorporated compound armor plate, which reduced weight considerably, as did the decision to omit the heavy belt armor the earlier ships had employed. The large gun was reduced significantly in caliber to 21 cm (8.3 in). Two ships of this design were ordered: Brummer and Bremse. They were the first ship of the German Navy to use compound plate.

=== General characteristics ===
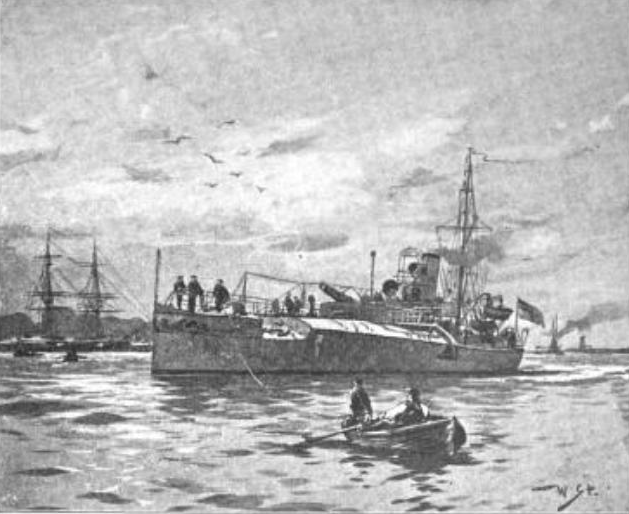
Brummer in port

The ships of the Brummer class were 62.6 meters (205 ft 5 in) long at the waterline and 64.8 m (212 ft 7 in) long overall, with a beam of 8.5 m (27 ft 11 in). They and a draft of 2.68 and 4.77 m (8 ft 10 in and 15 ft 8 in) forward and aft, respectively. They displaced 867 metric tons (853 long tons) as designed and 929 t (914 long tons) at full load. Their hulls were constructed with transverse steel frames, had a straight stem, and were divided into eight watertight compartments. The ships had a minimal superstructure that consisted of a small charthouse located amidships. They were fitted with a single pole mast for signaling purposes.

The ships' crew varied over the course of their careers, consisting of 3–5 officers and 62–73 enlisted men. The ships carried a number of smaller boats, including one picket boat, one launch, one cutter, one yawl, and one dinghy. Steering was controlled via a single rudder. Both ships were good sea boats, and maintained speed effectively in a head sea, but they tended to roll erratically and severely in a beam sea. They tended to ship considerable water forward, and had a large turning radius.

=== Machinery ===
They were powered by a pair of 2-cylinder double-expansion steam engines that were placed in-line and drove a single 4-bladed screw propeller that was 3.6 m (11 ft 10 in) in diameter. Steam was provided by two coal-fired cylindrical fire-tube boilers, which were vented through a single funnel. Each vessel had a pair of electric generators with a combined output of 9.75 kW (13.07 hp) at 65 Volts. Brummer's propulsion system gave her a top speed of 14.1 knots (26.1 km/h; 16.2 mph) at 1,658 metric horsepower (1,635 ihp), while Bremse was faster by more than a knot, making 15.2 knots (28.2 km/h; 17.5 mph) from 2,081 PS (2,053 ihp). The ships carried 68 t (67 long tons) of coal for the boilers. At a cruising speed of 10 knots (19 km/h; 12 mph), they could steam for 1,370 nautical miles (2,540 km; 1,580 mi), though when steaming at 15 knots, Bremse's range fell considerably, to 470 nmi (870 km; 540 mi).

=== Armament and armor ===
The ships were armed with a main battery that consisted of a single 21 cm (8.3 in) K L/30 built-up gun in an open barbette mount forward. The gun had a range of elevation from -8 to +13 degrees, and it had a maximum range of 7,900 m (8,600 yd). Ammunition supply amounted to fifty shells. This was supported by a single 8.7 cm (3.4 in) K L/24 built-up gun with 75 rounds of ammunition and two 37 mm (1.5 in) Hotchkiss revolver cannon. They were also armed with a 35 cm (13.8 in) torpedo tube submerged in her bow, which was supplied with three torpedoes.

Brummer and Bremse were protected by a compound armor deck that was 25 to 40 mm (0.98 to 1.57 in) thick in two layers. The barbette for the main battery was 160 mm (6.3 in) thick compound steel, backed with 200 mm (7.9 in) of teak planking. It was intended to protect the gun crew from end-on fire.

=== Modifications ===
In 1892, Brummer began use as a training ship for light automatic weapons, and she had a pair of new quick-firing guns of the 8.8 cm SK L/30 type installed. Later in her career, all of her old built-up guns and the torpedo tube were removed. The ship underwent another refit in the late 1890s, which included replacing her boilers, increasing the height of her funnel by 1 m (3 ft 3 in), and constructing a platform aft of the funnel.

== Ships ==
Construction data
Ship	Builder	Laid down	Launched	Commissioned
Brummer	AG Weser, Bremen	1883	5 January 1884	10 October 1884
Bremse	AG Weser, Bremen	1883	29 May 1884	22 December 1884

== Service history ==
Brummer as a torpedo-boat division leader

Brummer served in a variety of roles throughout her career. In her first years in service, she served as a flagship for a division of torpedo boats, and she took part in fleet training exercises in that role. Bremse saw comparatively little activity through her career, spending most of her time in the reserve fleet. She was first commissioned in 1891 to serve as a fisheries protection vessel in the North Sea. After a lengthy period in reserve, Brummer joined the gunnery training school in 1892, both as a tender and a training ship for light automatic weapons. She served in these roles intermittently over the next fifteen years. During this period, she also served as a fisheries protection vessel.

Bremse returned to service twice more, in 1893 and 1902, seeing duty on fishery protection patrols. In those years, she also visited Britain, and in 1893, she was present for a naval review in Kiel, Germany. She was struck from the naval register in 1903 and converted into a storage hulk. Later, she was modified to serve as a floating fuel oil storage tank. She was sold into civilian service in 1910; her ultimate fate is unknown. Meanwhile, Brummer was decommissioned for the last time in March 1907 and was struck from the naval register in May. She was thereafter converted into a hulk for various purposes. Brummer remained in the fleet's inventory through World War I, and during the conflict, she was used as a mooring hulk to support the torpedo nets protecting Kiel. She was eventually sold to ship breakers in 1921 and dismantled the following year.
