= SMS Bremse (1884) =

German ironclad gunboat

- Bremse's sister ship Brummer

History
- Name: Bremse
- Operator: Imperial German Navy
- Builder: AG Weser, Bremen
- Laid down: 1883
- Launched: 29 May 1884
- Commissioned: 22 December 1884
- Decommissioned: 29 August 1902
- Stricken: 10 March 1903
- Fate: Sold, 1910

General characteristics
- Class & type: Brummer-class gunboat
- Displacement: Design: 867 t (853 long tons); Full load: 929 t (914 long tons)
- Length: 64.8 m (212 ft 7 in)
- Beam: 8.5 m (27 ft 11 in)
- Draft: 2.68 to 4.77 m (8 ft 10 in to 15 ft 8 in)
- Installed power: 2 × fire-tube boilers; 1,658 PS (1,635 ihp)
- Propulsion: 2 × double-expansion steam engines; 1 × screw propeller
- Speed: 14.1 knots (26.1 km/h; 16.2 mph)
- Range: 1,370 nautical miles (2,540 km; 1,580 mi) at 10 knots (19 km/h; 12 mph)
- Complement: 3–5 officers; 62–73 enlisted men
- Armament: 1 × 21 cm (8.3 in) gun; 1 × 8.7 cm (3.4 in) gun; 2 × 37 mm (1.5 in) Hotchkiss revolver cannon; 1 × 35 cm (13.8 in) torpedo tube
- Armor: Barbette: 200 mm (7.9 in); Deck: 25–40 mm (0.98–1.57 in)

SMS Bremse was the second and final member of the Brummer class of armored gunboats built for the German Kaiserliche Marine in the 1880s. The ship was ordered to serve in Germany's coastal defense system alongside the Sachsen-class ironclads and Wespe-class gunboats. They were significantly less well armed and protected compared to the Wespes, but they were lighter and faster vessels. Bremse's primary armament was a single 21 cm (8.3 in) gun carried in her bow, and she had a top speed of about 15 knots (28 km/h; 17 mph).

Bremse saw relatively little activity through her career, spending most of her time in the reserve fleet. In 1891, 1893, and 1902, she was commissioned to serve as a fisheries protection vessel in the North Sea. In those years, she also visited Britain, and in 1893, she was present for a naval review in Kiel, Germany. She was struck from the naval register in 1903 and converted into a storage hulk. Later, she was modified to serve as a floating fuel oil storage tank. She was sold into civilian service in 1910; her ultimate fate is unknown.

== Design ==
The two Brummer-class gunboats were ordered in the early 1880s as a follow-on to the eleven Wespe-class gunboats that had been built in the late 1870s, which were intended to serve as part of an integrated coastal defense system, supporting the four Sachsen-class ironclads. The Wespes had proved to be controversial vessels, owing to their slow speed and tendency to roll badly, which was caused by their excessive weight, particularly the very large gun they carried. As a result, the Brummer class carried a smaller gun and dispensed with the heavy belt armor used in the Wespes. They also introduced new compound armor, rather than the old, heavy wrought iron used in the earlier vessels.

Bremse was 64.8 meters (212 ft 7 in) long overall, with a beam of 8.5 m (27 ft 11 in) and a draft of 2.68 to 4.77 m (8 ft 10 in to 15 ft 8 in). She displaced 867 metric tons (853 long tons) as designed and 929 t (914 long tons) at full load. The ship's crew varied over the course of her career, consisting of 3–5 officers and 62–73 enlisted men. She was powered by a pair of double-expansion steam engines that drove a single 4-bladed screw propeller, with steam provided by two coal-fired cylindrical fire-tube boilers, which gave her a top speed of 15.2 knots (28.2 km/h; 17.5 mph) at 2,081 metric horsepower (2,053 ihp). At a cruising speed of 10 knots (19 km/h; 12 mph), she could steam for 1,370 nautical miles (2,540 km; 1,580 mi).

The ship was armed with a main battery that consisted of a single 21 cm (8.3 in) K L/30 built-up gun in an open barbette mount forward. This was supported by a single 8.7 cm (3.4 in) K L/24 built-up gun and two 37 mm (1.5 in) Hotchkiss revolver cannons. She was also armed with a 35 cm (13.8 in) torpedo tube submerged in her bow. Bremse was protected by a compound armor deck that was 25 to 40 mm (0.98 to 1.57 in) thick. The barbette for the main battery was 160 mm (6.3 in) thick compound steel, backed with 200 mm (7.9 in) of teak planking.

== Service history ==
Bremse was built at the AG Weser shipyard in Bremen; she was laid down in 1883 under the contract designation "N". (Note: German warships were ordered under provisional names. Additions to the fleet were given a single letter; ships intended to replace older or lost vessels were ordered as "Ersatz (name of the ship to be replaced)".) She was launched on 29 May 1884. After fitting out work was completed later that year, she was moved to the Kaiserliche Werft (Imperial Shipyard) in Wilhelmshaven to have her armament installed. She was commissioned on 22 December to begin sea trials, which lasted until 23 January 1885. Bremse was thereafter decommissioned and placed in reserve for the next five years. The ship was recommissioned on 17 March 1891, under the command of Korvettenkapitän (KK—Corvette Captain) Gottlieb Becker. The ship was used to patrol fishing grounds in the German Bight. On 27 August, she sailed around Denmark to join the main fleet in Kiel for the annual fleet training exercises. Bremse returned to Wilhelmshaven on 18 September and resumed fishery protection duties until 11 November. During this period, she cruised as far as the Dogger Bank in the North Sea, and from 12 to 17 October, she visited Hull, Britain. She stopped in Harwich, Britain, from 24 to 30 October. She was decommissioned in Wilhelmshaven for the winter months on 19 November.

The ship was recommissioned again on 15 March 1893 and resumed fishery protection patrols in the North Sea; this time, she was commanded by KK Hans Meyer. This was interrupted on 15 March, when she once again made the voyage around Denmark to participate in a naval review in Kiel held in honor of the visit of Tsar Alexander III of Russia. By 18 June, she had returned to the North Sea for fishery protection duties. Bremse joined the fleet for the annual maneuvers that began on 16 August in the western Baltic Sea. She then returned to Wilhelmshaven, where she was decommissioned again on 30 September. Bremse spent nearly the next decade in the reserve fleet.

Bremse returned to service for the third and final time on 2 April 1902, once again to serve as a fishery protection ship. That year, she operated alongside the aviso Zieten in the North Sea. During this period, she visited several German and British ports. From 7 to 13 May, she made a visit to Kiel. The next three months passed uneventfully, and on 29 August, she was decommissioned for the last time in Wilhelmshaven. She was struck from the naval register on 10 March 1903 and was converted into a storage hulk, and later into a fuel oil barge. She was sold to a company in Düsseldorf in 1910 for use as a barge. Her ultimate fate is unknown.
