= SMS Brummer (1884) =

German ironclad gunboat

History
- Name: Brummer
- Operator: Imperial German Navy
- Builder: AG Weser, Bremen
- Laid down: 1883
- Launched: 5 January 1884
- Commissioned: 10 October 1884
- Decommissioned: 27 March 1907
- Stricken: 27 May 1907
- Fate: Broken up, 1922

General characteristics
- Class & type: Brummer-class gunboat
- Displacement: Design: 867 t (853 long tons); Full load: 929 t (914 long tons)
- Length: 64.8 m (212 ft 7 in)
- Beam: 8.5 m (27 ft 11 in)
- Draft: 2.68 to 4.77 m (8 ft 10 in to 15 ft 8 in)
- Installed power: 2 × fire-tube boilers; 1,658 PS (1,635 ihp)
- Propulsion: 2 × double-expansion steam engines; 1 × screw propeller
- Speed: 14.1 knots (26.1 km/h; 16.2 mph)
- Range: 1,370 nautical miles (2,540 km; 1,580 mi) at 10 knots (19 km/h; 12 mph)
- Complement: 3–5 officers; 62–73 enlisted men
- Armament: 1 × 21 cm (8.3 in) gun; 1 × 8.7 cm (3.4 in) gun; 2 × 37 mm (1.5 in) Hotchkiss revolver cannon; 1 × 35 cm (13.8 in) torpedo tube
- Armor: Barbette: 200 mm (7.9 in); Deck: 25–40 mm (0.98–1.57 in)

SMS Brummer was the lead ship of the Brummer class of armored gunboats built for the German Kaiserliche Marine in the 1880s. The ship was ordered to serve in Germany's coastal defense system alongside the Sachsen-class ironclads and Wespe-class gunboats. They were significantly less well armed and protected compared to the Wespes, but they were lighter and faster vessels. Brummer's primary armament was a single 21 cm (8.3 in) gun carried in her bow, and she had a top speed of about 14 knots (26 km/h; 16 mph).

Brummer served in a variety of roles during her career. In her first years in service, she served as a flagship for a division of torpedo boats, and she took part in fleet training exercises in that role. After a lengthy period in reserve, she joined the gunnery training school in 1892, both as a tender and a training ship for light automatic weapons. During this period, she also served as a fisheries protection vessel. Decommissioned for the last time in March 1907, she was struck from the naval register in May and thereafter converted into a hulk for various purposes. Brummer was eventually sold for scrap in 1921 and broken up the next year.

== Design ==
The two Brummer-class gunboats were ordered in the early 1880s as a follow-on to the eleven Wespe-class gunboats that had been built in the late 1870s, which were intended to serve as part of an integrated coastal defense system, supporting the four Sachsen-class ironclads. The Wespes had proved to be controversial vessels, owing to their slow speed and tendency to roll badly, which were caused by excessive weight, particularly the very large gun they carried. As a result, the Brummer class carried a smaller gun and dispensed with the heavy belt armor used in the Wespes. They also introduced new compound armor, rather than the old, heavy wrought iron used in the earlier vessels.

Brummer was 64.8 meters (212 ft 7 in) long overall, with a beam of 8.5 m (27 ft 11 in) and a draft of 2.68 to 4.77 m (8 ft 10 in to 15 ft 8 in). She displaced 867 metric tons (853 long tons) as designed and 929 t (914 long tons) at full load. The ship's crew varied over the course of her career, consisting of 3–5 officers and 62–73 enlisted men. She was powered by a pair of double-expansion steam engines that drove a single 4-bladed screw propeller, with steam provided by two coal-fired cylindrical fire-tube boilers, which gave her a top speed of 14.1 knots (26.1 km/h; 16.2 mph) at 1,658 metric horsepower (1,635 ihp). At a cruising speed of 10 knots (19 km/h; 12 mph), she could steam for 1,370 nautical miles (2,540 km; 1,580 mi).

The ship was armed with a main battery that consisted of a single 21 cm (8.3 in) K L/30 built-up gun in an open barbette mount forward. This was supported by a single 8.7 cm (3.4 in) K L/24 built-up gun and two 37 mm (1.5 in) Hotchkiss revolver cannon. She was also armed with a 35 cm (13.8 in) torpedo tube submerged in her bow. Brummer was protected by a compound armor deck that was 25 to 40 mm (0.98 to 1.57 in) thick. The barbette for the main battery was 160 mm (6.3 in) thick compound steel, backed with 200 mm (7.9 in) of teak planking.

== Service history ==
Brummer as a torpedo-boat division leader

The keel for Brummer was laid down at the AG Weser shipyard in Bremen in 1883 under the provisional designation "M". (Note: German warships were ordered under provisional names. Additions to the fleet were given a single letter; ships intended to replace older or lost vessels were ordered as "Ersatz (name of the ship to be replaced)".) She was launched on 5 January 1884. After fitting out work was completed later that year, and she was moved to the Kaiserliche Werft (Imperial Shipyard) in Wilhelmshaven to have her armament installed. She was commissioned on 10 October to begin sea trials, which lasted until 21 February 1885 and included a voyage around Denmark to Kiel.

On 1 May, Brummer became the flagship of the 2nd Torpedo-boat Division. She conducted individual training exercises and then assembled with her division with the rest of the Torpedo-boat Flotilla, which was led by Alfred von Tirpitz aboard the aviso Blitz, for combined exercises beginning on 28 July. During the maneuvers in August and September, Brummer and her torpedo boats served with the Torpedo-boat Flotilla, which numbered fifteen torpedo-boats. They operated along with an armored warship division composed of Bayern, Friedrich Carl, and Hansa, and an unarmored division that comprised three old sail corvettes and the aviso Pfeil for training exercises in the Baltic; this was the first of the so-called "autumn maneuvers" (though they would typically end in late summer or very early autumn). Brummer was decommissioned for the winter months on 5 October in Wilhelmshaven.

Brummer was recommissioned on 4 May 1886 under the command of Kapitänleutnant (KL—Captain Lieutenant) Carl Wodrig. The year passed similarly to 1885, with individual training, maneuvers with the entire flotilla, followed by the annual fleet maneuvers in August and September. That year, Brummer and the rest of the Torpedo-boat Flotilla served as III Division during the exercises. The ship was again laid up for the winter on 9 October. By that time, the new, larger D1-class torpedo boats began to enter service; these were intended to serve as division flagships for the standard torpedo boats, so Brummer was no longer needed to serve in that capacity. She remained out of service for the next six years.

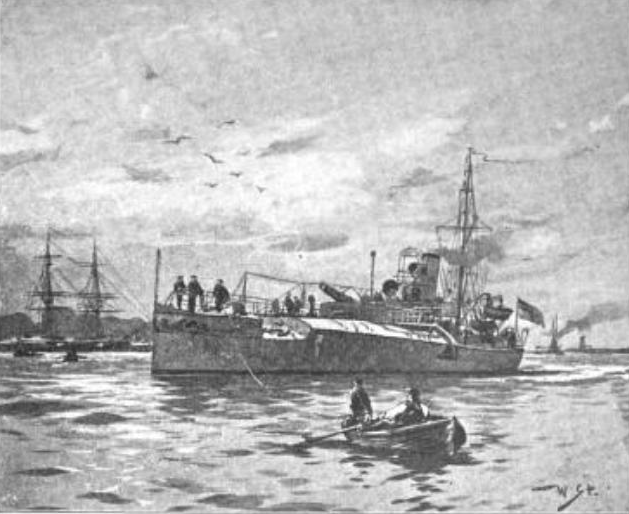
Brummer in port

She was next recommissioned on 2 March 1892 to serve as a tender to the artillery training ship Mars as part of the German navy's gunnery school. She was also used to train gunners for light automatic weapons, and for that purpose, she had a pair of new quick-firing guns of the 8.8 cm SK L/30 type installed. These guns were also used in fire-control experiments, where the guns would alternate firing at a target while the ship was underway, so that range changes could be determined. This was the first step toward systematized fire control in the German fleet. She was decommissioned again on 4 August. The ship repeated this service when she was recommissioned on 14 February 1893. In March, KL Carl Franz took command of the ship. Beginning on 10 April, Brummer began operations to patrol fishing grounds in Germany's territorial waters. She joined the fleet for the annual maneuvers in September, and on 30 September she was decommissioned again. When Brummer returned to service on 20 March 1894, she resumed fishery protection patrols in the North Sea. This lasted until mid-August when she was attached to the training fleet for the annual maneuvers; she filled the role of a fleet scout during the exercises before being decommissioned on 29 September.

The ship saw another lengthy period in the reserve fleet, and during this period, she had her boilers replaced with newer models, her funnel was raised in height by 1 m (3 ft 3 in), and a platform was installed aft. She was next recommissioned on 3 April 1900, once again to serve as a gunnery training ship for light automatic weapons. Training was carried out in the German Bight and in the western Baltic Sea, and it concluded on 22 December, though Brummer remained in commission through the winter for the first time. She resumed training duties in mid-February 1901, and at that time she came under the command of KL Heinrich Trendtel, who served as captain until September. Training activities concluded on 15 November that year. On 14 January 1901, she returned to training operations, and that year, she served as a tender to the gunnery test ship Freya. On 13 November, the two ships collided off Schlei, though neither vessel was significantly damaged in the accident. Brummer's training activities ended on 28 November, and she was thereafter stationed in Wilhelmshaven with a reduced crew.

Brummer replenished her crew and returned to training activities on 3 February 1903; the year passed uneventfully for the ship, and she reverted to a reduced crew on 15 November. The year 1904 passed similarly, with training taking place from mid-February to 3 October. She remained out of service with a reduced crew until 10 January 1905, when she was decommissioned; her role with the gunnery training school had been filled with a modern cruiser. Brummer was recommissioned for the last time on 14 November 1906 to replace Pfeil as a tender to the main battle fleet, while the latter vessel was in dry dock for periodic maintenance. This service ended on 22 March 1907, when Pfeil returned to the fleet. Brummer was decommissioned five days later, and she was struck from the naval register on 27 May. She was used as a storage hulk at Kiel until the outbreak of World War I in 1914, when she was converted into a mooring hulk to anchor torpedo nets used to defend the approaches to the harbor. She served in this capacity through the war, and was eventually sold to ship breakers on 2 July 1921. She was broken up the following year in Wilhelmshaven.
