= Khamsa =

Khamsa (Arabic, lit. 'five' or 'quintet') may refer to:

- Hamsa, a popular amulet in the Middle East and North Africa, also romanized as khamsa
- Al Khamsa, a bloodline for Arabian horses that traces back to five mares
- Al Khamsa (organization), a nonprofit organization in the United States that supports the breeding of Al Khamsa bloodline horses
- Khamseh, a tribal people of Iran
- Khamsa (film), a 2008 film
- Khamsa, a quintet of five long Persian poems, such as the Khamsa of Nizami Ganjavi or that of Hatefi

== See also ==
- Khamsa of Nizami (British Library, Or. 12208), the manuscript of the five poems of Nezami Ganjavi
- Melikdoms of Karabakh, also known as Khamsa Melikdoms, the five Armenian Melikdoms of Karabakh, from the Middle Ages to the Early Modern Age.
- Hamsa (disambiguation)
- Khansa (disambiguation)
