= Kamsa (disambiguation) =

Kamsa, in Hinduism, is the half-brother of Devaki, the mother of Krishna, and ruler of the Vrishni kingdom in Mathura.

Kamsa may also refer to:

- Camsá language or Kamsa language
- Kamsa and Bar Kamsa or Kamtza and Bar Kamtza, famous midrash (legend) regarding the destruction of the Second Temple in Jerusalem in the 1st century
- Kamsa, Tibet, a village in Tibet, China

== See also ==
- Kansa (disambiguation)
