= Valiya Hamza =

Indian geophysicist

Valiya Mannathal Hamza
- Born: 15 June 1941 (age 85); Calicut, Madras Province, British India, Present day Kerala
- Education: National Geophysical Research Institute, University of Kerala, University of Western Ontario
- Known for: Discovery of the Hamza River
- Scientific career
- Fields: Geophysics
- Workplaces: Observatório Nacional

Valiya Mannathal Hamza (born 15 June 1941) is an Indian scientist credited with co-discovering, together with Elizabeth Tavares Pimentel, the large aquifer referred to as "Rio Hamza" or Hamza River, which flows deep below and parallel to the Amazon. Hamza is listed as a permanent professor in the Geophysics specialization at the Brazilian National Observatory.

== Education ==
Hamza did his undergraduate and postgraduate studies at the University of Kerala in the 1960s, finishing with a graduate degree in physics in 1962 and a postgraduate degree in applied physics in 1964. He started as a senior scientific assistant at the National Geophysical Research Institute in Hyderabad, India in 1966. He moved to the University of Western Ontario, Canada, for his PhD in 1968, and completed the degree in 1973, subsequently going to Brazil in 1974.

== Career ==
Hamza served as an associate professor of the University of São Paulo from 1974 to 1981, and a research supervisor at the Institute of Technology Research from 1982 to 1993. He also held positions as a secretary of the International Heat Flow Commission and member of the executive committee of the International Association of Seismology and Physics of the Earth's Interior.

Hamza and colleague Elizabeth Tavares Pimentel discovered a subterranean river running along the same route as the Amazon River in 2011, which was later named after Hamza.
