= Hamza River =

Aquifer in Brazil and Peru

The Hamza River (Portuguese: Rio Hamza) is an unofficial name for what appears to be a slowly flowing aquifer in Brazil and Peru, approximately 6,000 kilometres (3,700 mi) long at a depth of nearly 4 kilometres (2.5 mi). Its discovery was announced in 2011 at a meeting of the Geophysical Society in Rio de Janeiro. The unofficial name is in honour of Indian scientist Valiya Mannathal Hamza, of Brazil's National Observatory, who has undertaken research on the region for four decades. The Hamza "river" and the Amazon River form a geologically unusual instance of a twin-river system flowing at different levels of the Earth's crust.

== Description ==
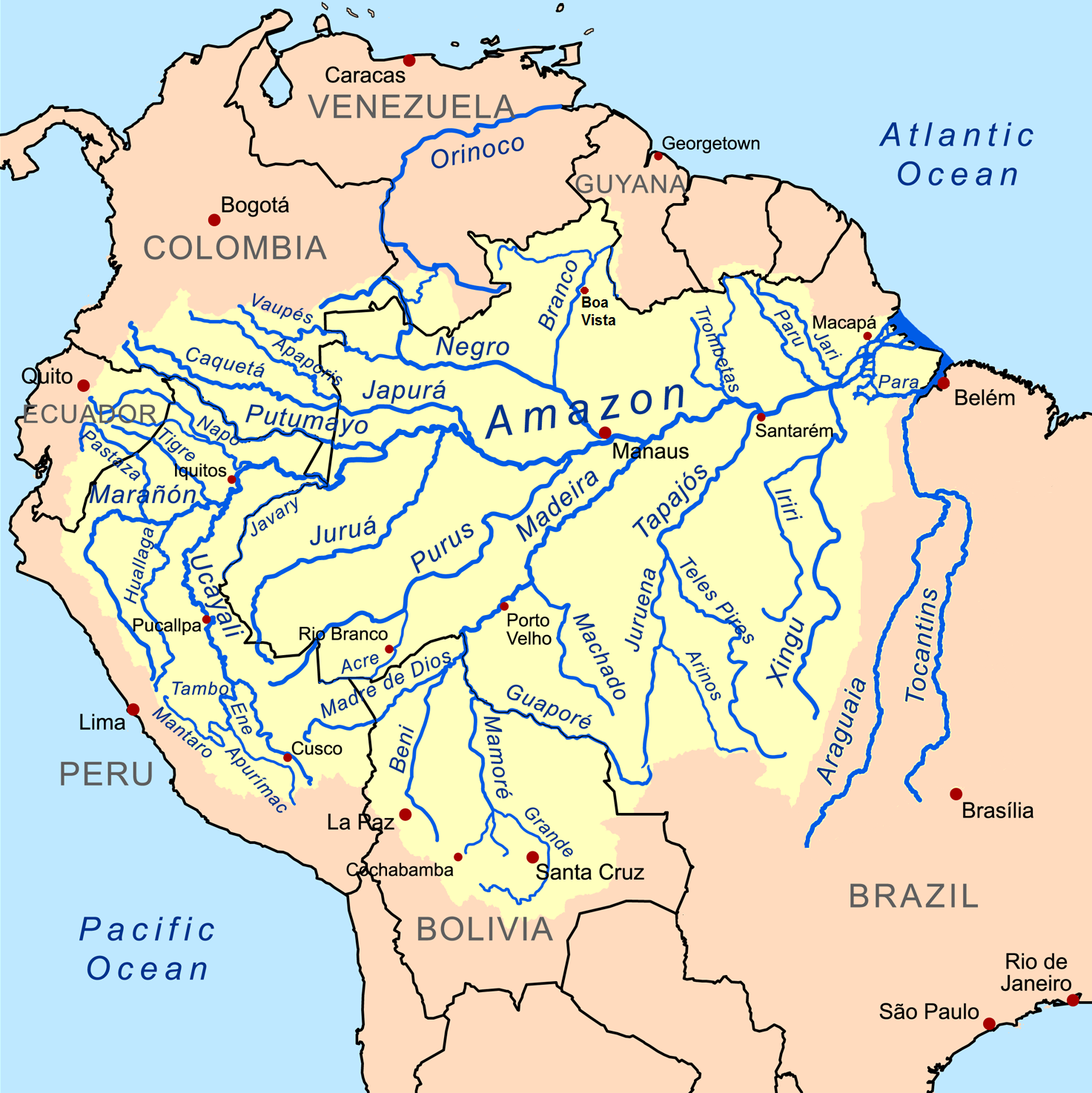
Map of the Amazon river basin

The Hamza and the Amazon are the two main drainage systems for the Amazon Basin. The reported flow rate of the Hamza, at approximately 3,000 cubic metres (110,000 cu ft) per second, is 3% of the Amazon's. It runs west to east, some 4,000 metres (13,000 ft) below the Earth's surface, and follows roughly the path of the Amazon River. The Hamza is born in the Andes and empties in the Atlantic Ocean, deep under the surface. Its own water has a high salt content.

It flows from the Andean foothills to the Atlantic coast in a nearly west-to-east direction like the Amazon River. A combination of seismic data and anomalous temperature variation with depth measured in 241 inactive oil wells helped locate the aquifer. Except for the flow direction, the Amazon and the Hamza have very different characteristics. The most obvious ones are their width and flow speed. While the Amazon is 1 kilometre (0.62 mi) to 50 kilometres (31 mi) wide, the Hamza is 200 kilometres (120 mi) to 400 kilometres (250 mi) in width. The flow speed of the Amazon is 2 metres per second (6.6 ft/s) while the Hamza is less than 1 millimetre per second (0.039 in/s).

== Geology ==
Several geological factors have played a vital role in the formation and existence of these subterranean water bodies. The porous and permeable sedimentary rocks behave as conduits for the water to sink to greater depths. East–west trending faults and the karst topography present along the northern border of the Amazon basin may have some role in supplying water to the "river". If the impermeable rocks stop the vertical flow, the west-to-east gradient of the topography directs it to flow towards the Atlantic Ocean.

Unlike the Hamza, the 153 km-long (95 mi) underground river in Mexico's Yucatán Peninsula and the 8.2 km-long (5.1 mi) Cabayugan River in the Puerto Princesa Subterranean River National Park in the Philippines have come into being thanks to the karst topography. Water in these places has dissolved the carbonate rock to form extensive underground river systems.

== Research status and debate ==
The Hamza was discovered by a team of scientists led by Valiya Hamza using thermal data collected from 241 inactive oil wells in the area, drilled in the 1970s and 1980s, by the Petrobras oil company. Calculations from the data showed that a larger flow should exist. Direct observation of water movement at a very low rate can be difficult. The speed of flow is slower than that of an average glacier, and Hamza himself says that the team uses the term "river" in a general sense, not in the conventional sense. In the title to the original paper, the word "river" appears in quotation marks.

The evidence was presented at the 12th International Congress of the Brazilian Geophysical Society in Rio de Janeiro and as of August 2011 has not yet been published, although the research team noted that the techniques used to predict the flowing aquifer's presence are not unusual for earth science. Scientists have explained that the research results are preliminary, and that the definite scientific validation of the existence of the flowing aquifer is to be expected in a few years.

== See also ==
- Valiya Hamza
- Hydrogeology
- Amazon River
- Apurimac River
