= Khansa (crater) =

Crater on Mercury

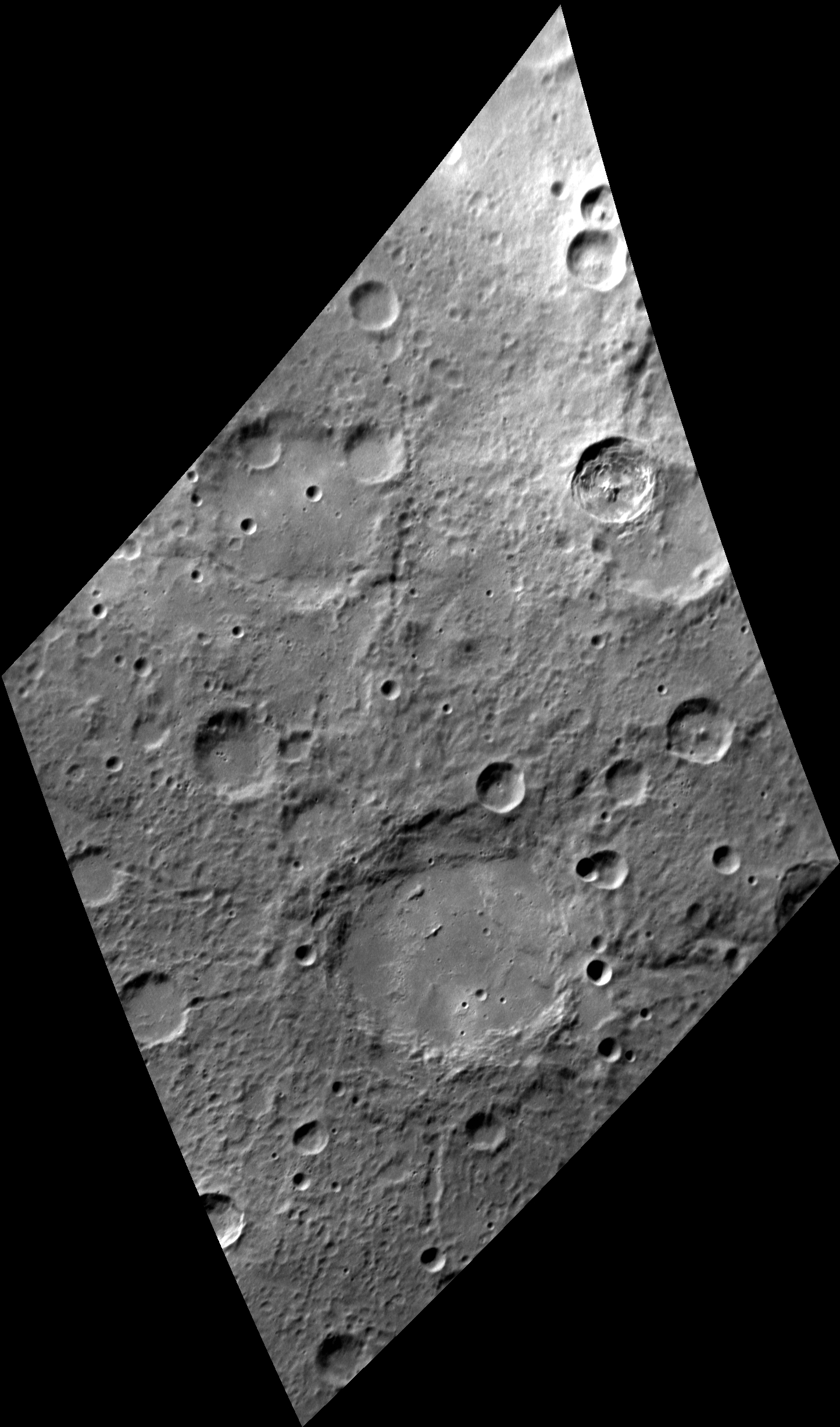
- MESSENGER NAC image, map projected
- Feature type: Impact crater
- Location: Discovery quadrangle, Mercury
- Coordinates: 58.95°S 51.94°W
- Diameter: 113 km (70 mi)
- Eponym: al-Khansa

Khansa is a crater on Mercury. Its name was adopted by the International Astronomical Union (IAU) in 1976. Khansa is named after the Arab poet al-Khansa, who lived in the 6th century CE.

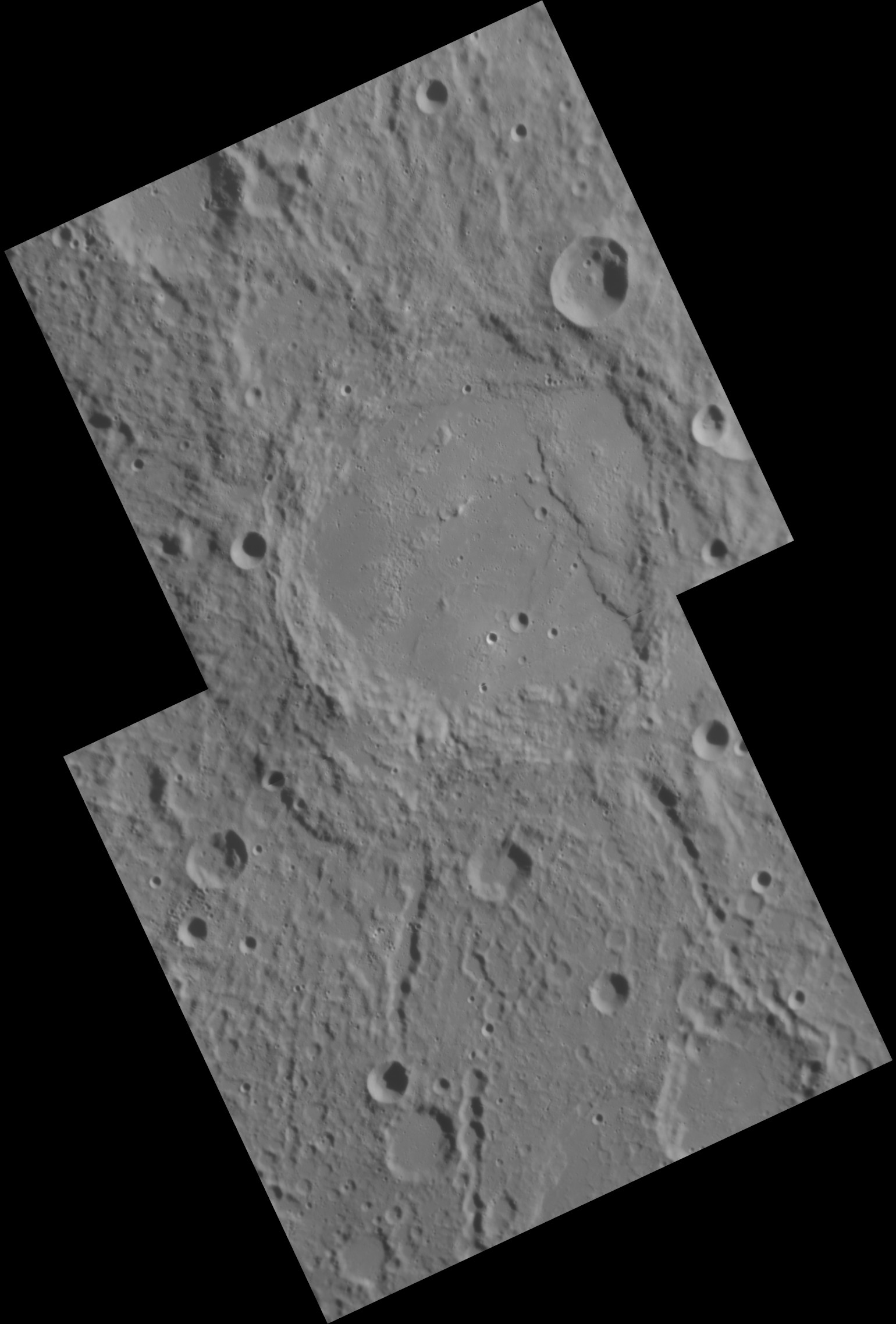
MESSENGER NAC mosaic
