= Friedrich Bayern =

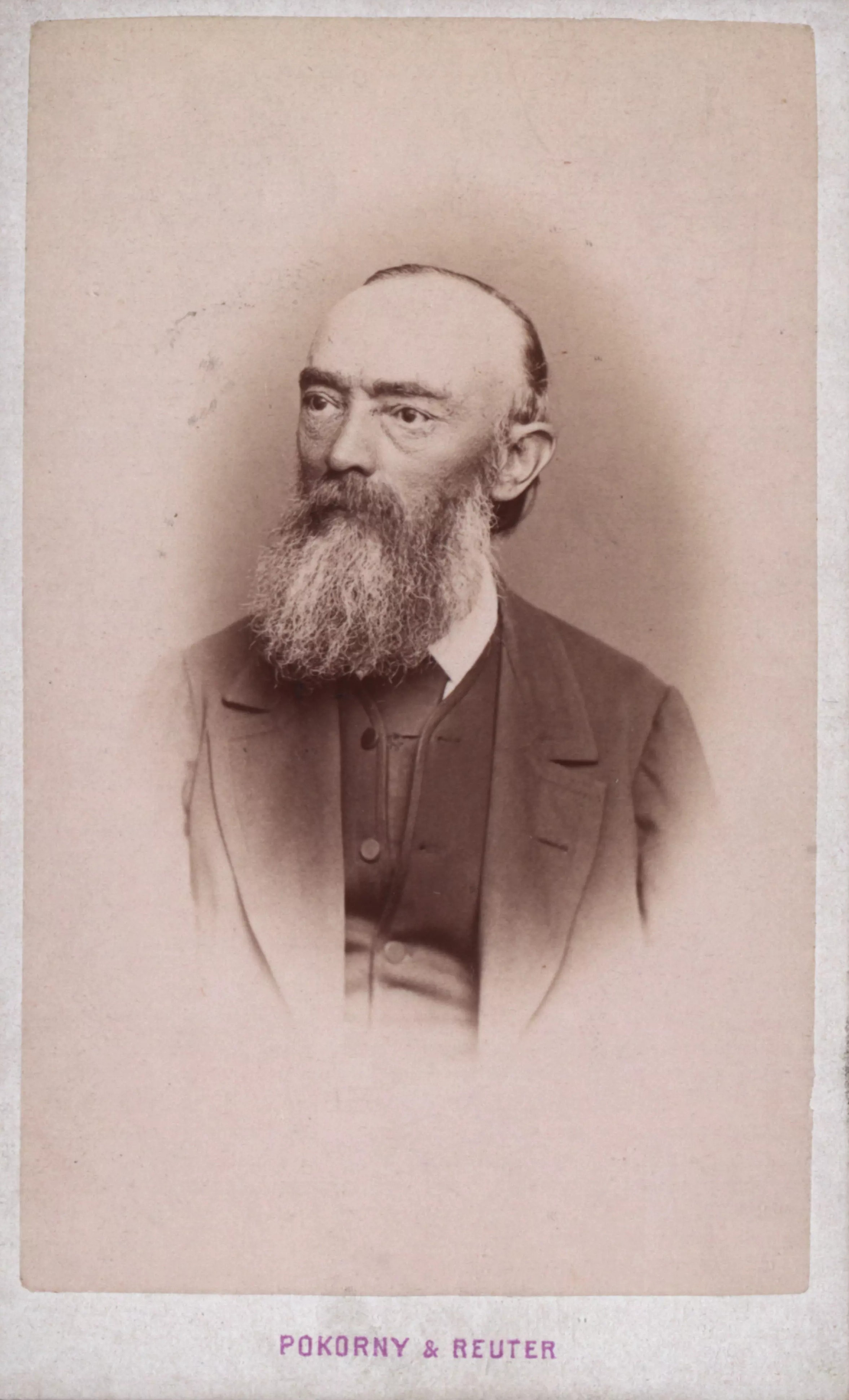

Friedrich Samoilovich Bayern (Russian: Фридрих Самойлович Байерн; October 8, 1817 – February 20, 1886) Russian naturalist and archaeologist. He collected extensively in the Caucasus region. He became a custodian for the Caucasus Museum in Tiflis.

== Life and work ==
Bayern was born in Kronstadt, Transylvania, in the Austrian Empire (now Brașov, in Romania); the son of Riemer Samuel Bayer. He was educated locally where he was introduced to natural history collecting by his teachers Hiemesch and Wolf. He then trained in business, and worked from 1838 in Kronstadt, Sibiu, and from 1839 in Bucharest in Wallachia where he worked as a private tutor from 1842. He then travelled to Odessa where he began to study the natural history and antiquities of the Black Sea region under Alexander von Nordmann and then began to collect beetles for Count Mnischek. He then also worked under Baron Maximilien de Chaudoir who recommended him to Prince Mikhail Semyonovich Vorontsov. Vorontsov took Bayern to the Caucasus in 1849 and here Bayern began to examine nature and antiquities. Hermann Abich and Bayern worked together and Abich recommended him to the position of curator at the museum of the geographical society in Tiflis. From here he went on collecting trips to Armenia in the Ararat region. He collected extensively for what would later go into the Caucasian Museum in Tbilisi. He accompanied Rudolf Virchow who visited Tiflis. He was among the first to excavate tombs and prehistoric dolmens in the regions of Mzchet (Samthavro) and Marienfeld (Sartaschli) and his studies were presented at the fifth Archaeological Congress which was held in Tbilisi. He excavated the Mtskheta burial grounds with more than 600 tombs in the 1870s.
