= SS Hansa =

SS Hansa may refer to the following ships:

- SS Hansa (1861), a Bremen steamship sold in 1879
- SS Hansa (1879), a German steamship wrecked in 1880 on her maiden voyage
- SS Hansa (1881), a German tender scrapped in 1922
- SS Hansa (1889), a German steamship sold in 1908
- SS Hansa (1899), a Swedish passenger ship sunk in 1944
- SS Hansa (1900), a German transatlantic ocean liner of 1900, scrapped in 1925, renamed Hansa in 1921
- SS Hansa (1904), a British steamship in service until 1937
- SS Hansa (1923), a German and then Soviet ocean liner launched 1922 and scrapped 1981, named Hansa (1935–1945)

== See also ==
- Hansa (disambiguation)
