= Kansa, Bangladesh =

Kansa, Bangladesh Katakhali Katakhali
- Nickname: Katakhali
- Location in Bangladesh
- Coordinates: 22°40′N 90°8′E
- Country: Bangladesh
- Division: Barisal Division
- Jhalakati District: Jhalakati Sadar Upozilla
- Time zone: UTC+6 (Bangladesh Time)
  - Summer (DST): +7

Kansa, Bangladesh is a village in Jhalakati District in the Barisal Division of southwestern Bangladesh.
