= SMS Bayern (1878) =

Armored corvette of the German Imperial Navy

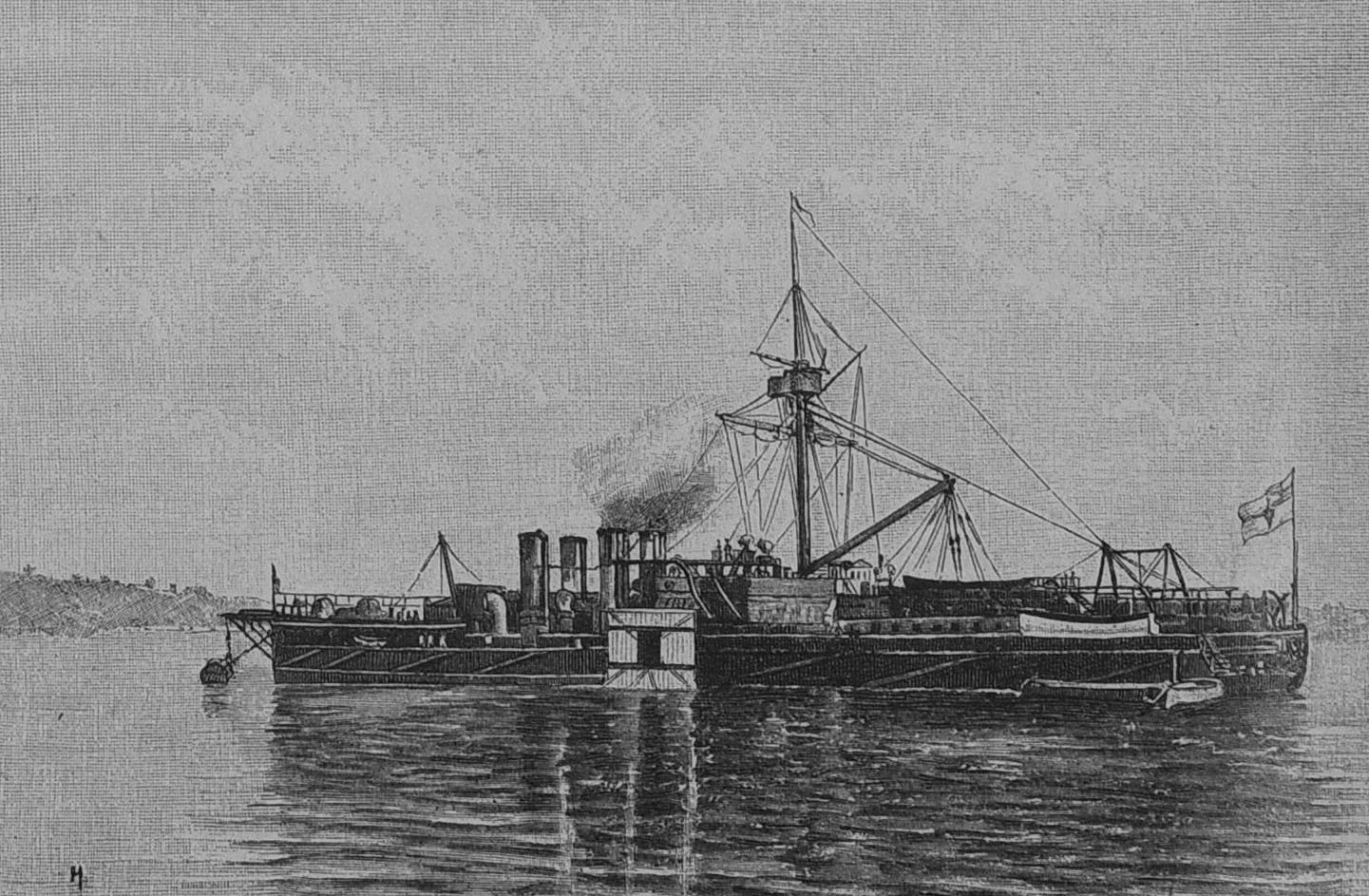
- SMS Bayern

History

German Empire
- Name: SMS Bayern
- Builder: Kaiserliche Werft, Kiel
- Laid down: June 1874
- Launched: 13 May 1878
- Commissioned: 4 August 1881
- Decommissioned: 12 February 1900
- Stricken: 19 February 1910
- Fate: Sold for scrap, 1919

General characteristics
- Class & type: Sachsen-class ironclad
- Displacement: 7,742 t (7,620 long tons)
- Length: 98.2 m (322 ft 2 in)
- Beam: 18.4 m (60 ft 4 in)
- Draft: 6.32 m (20 ft 9 in)
- Installed power: 8 × Dürr boilers; 5,600 ihp (4,200 kW)
- Propulsion: 2 × single-expansion steam engines; 2 × screw propellers
- Speed: 13 knots (24 km/h; 15 mph)
- Range: 1,940 nmi (3,590 km; 2,230 mi) at 10 kn (19 km/h; 12 mph)
- Complement: 32 officers; 285 enlisted men
- Armament: 6 × 26 cm (10.2 in) L/22 guns; 6 × 8.7 cm (3.4 in) guns; 8 × 3.7 cm (1.5 in) guns
- Armor: Belt: 203–254 mm (8–10 in); Deck: 50–75 mm (2–3 in)

SMS Bayern (Note: "SMS" stands for "Seiner Majestät Schiff", or "His Majesty's Ship".) was one of four Sachsen-class armored frigates of the German Kaiserliche Marine (Imperial Navy). Her sister ships were Sachsen, Baden, and Württemberg. Named for Bavaria, Bayern was built by the Kaiserliche Werft (Imperial Dockyard) in Kiel from 1874 to 1881. The ship was commissioned into the Imperial Navy in August 1881. She was armed with a main battery of six 26 cm (10.2 in) guns in two open barbettes.

After her commissioning, Bayern served with the fleet on numerous training exercises and cruises. She participated in several cruises escorting Kaiser Wilhelm II on state visits to Great Britain and to various cities in the Baltic Sea in the late 1880s and early 1890s. During 1895–1898, the ship was modernized at the Schichau-Werke dockyard in Danzig; she served for another decade with the fleet before being withdrawn from active service in 1910. She was used as a target ship after 1911, until she was sold in 1919 and broken up for scrap.

== Design ==
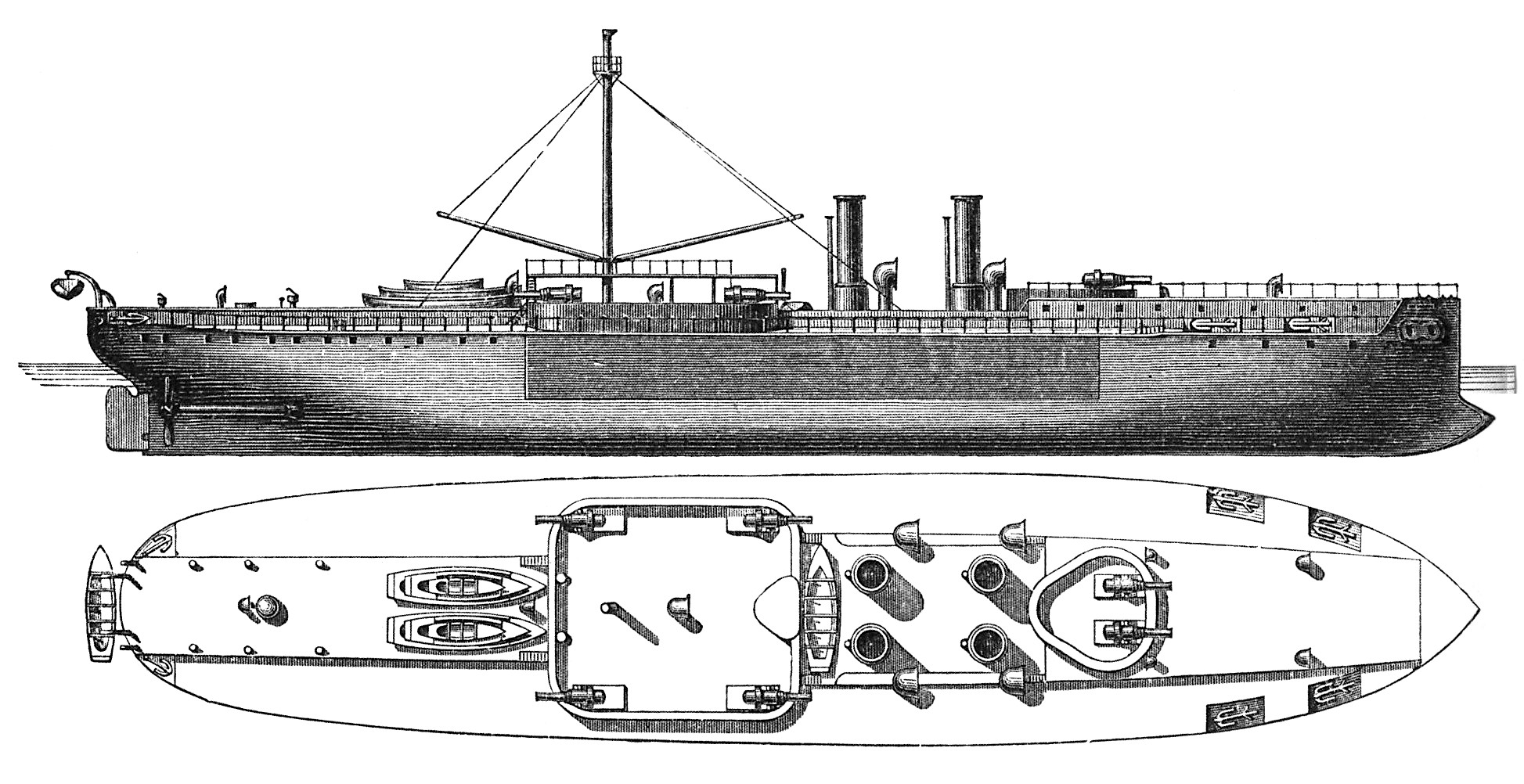
Plan and profile drawing of the Sachsen-class ships

The Sachsen class was the first group of capital ships built under the tenure of General Albrecht von Stosch, the first Chief of the Imperial Admiralty. Stosch favored a coastal defense strategy for the German fleet, and the Sachsens were intended to operate from fortified ports, from which they could sortie to attack blockading fleets. They proved to be controversial in service, as critics pointed out their poor seakeeping, tendency to roll in heavy seas, and low speed compared to earlier armored frigates.

The ship was 98.2 m (322 ft 2 in) long overall and had a beam of 18.4 m (60 ft 4 in) and a draft of 6.32 m (20 ft 9 in) forward. She displaced 7,742 t (7,620 long tons; 8,534 short tons) at full load. Bayern was powered by two 3-cylinder single-expansion steam engines, which were supplied with steam by eight coal-fired Dürr boilers. The boilers were vented into four funnels in an unusual square arrangement. Along with her three sisters, Bayern was the first large, armored warship built for the German navy that relied entirely on engines for propulsion. The ship's top speed was 13 knots (24 km/h; 15 mph), at 5,600 metric horsepower (5,500 ihp). Her standard complement consisted of 32 officers and 285 enlisted men, though while serving as a squadron flagship this was augmented by another 7 officers and 34 men.

She was armed with a main battery of six 26 cm (10.2 in) guns, two of which were single-mounted in an open barbette forward of the conning tower and the remaining four mounted amidships, also on single mounts in an open barbette. As built, the ship was also equipped with six 8.7 cm (3.4 in) L/24 guns and eight 3.7 cm (1.5 in) Hotchkiss revolver cannons for defense against torpedo boats.

Bayern's armor was made of wrought iron, and was concentrated in an armored citadel amidships. The armor ranged from 203 to 254 mm (8 to 10 in) on the armored citadel, and between 50–75 mm (2–3 in) on the deck. The barbette armor was 254 mm of wrought iron backed by 250 mm of teak.

== Service history ==
=== Construction – 1885 ===
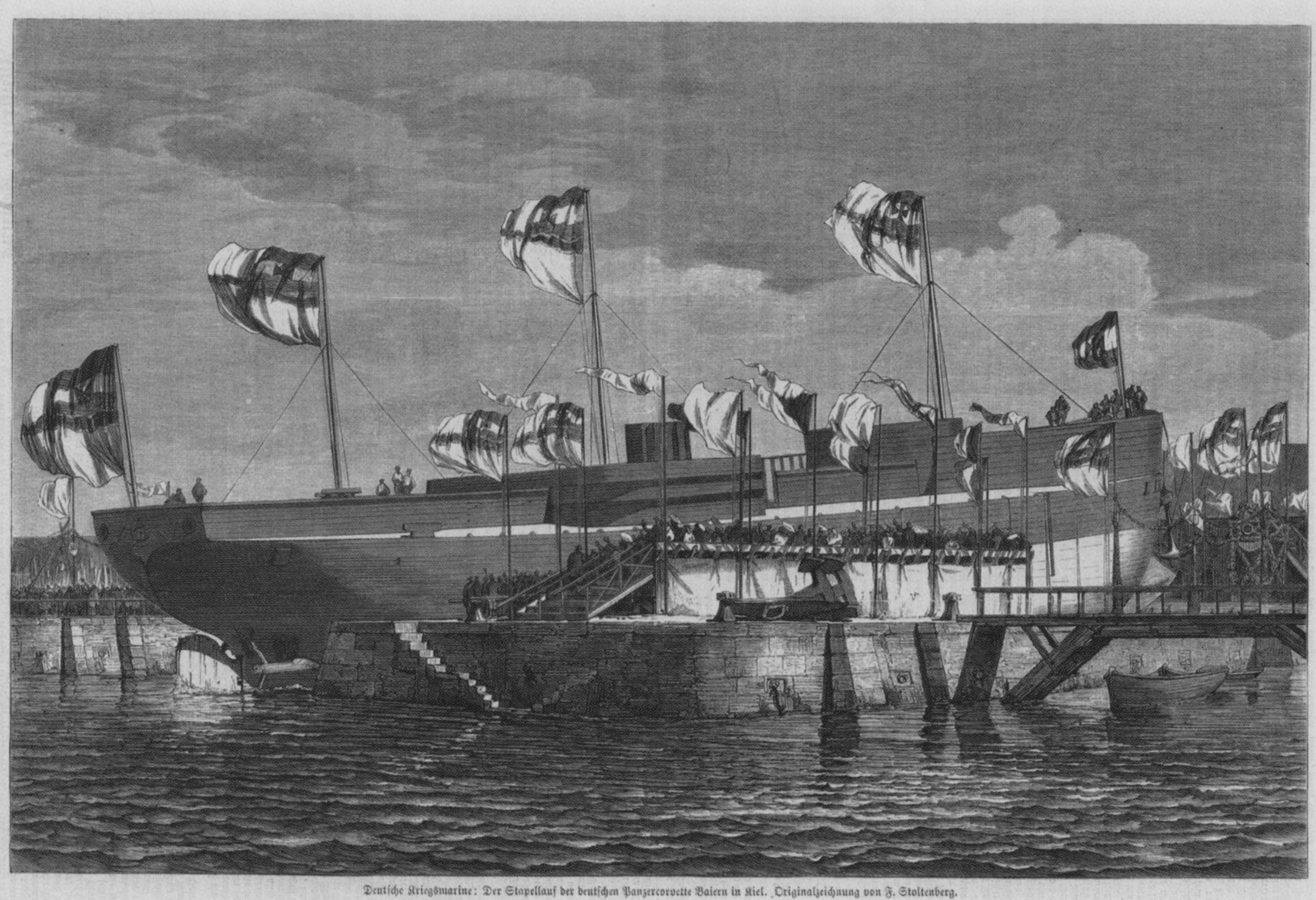
Bayern at her launching

Bayern was ordered by the Imperial Navy under the contract name "A," which denoted that the vessel was a new addition to the fleet. (Note: German warships were ordered under provisional names. Additions to the fleet were given a single letter; ships intended to replace older or lost vessels were ordered as "Ersatz (name of the ship to be replaced)".) She was built at the Kaiserliche Werft (Imperial Shipyard) in Wilhelmshaven; her keel was laid down in June 1874 under yard number 3. The ship was launched on 13 May 1878, and at the launching ceremony, Franz August Schenk von Stauffenberg, the vice president of the Reichstag (Imperial Diet) attended the ceremony aboard the aviso Grille, from which he gave the launching speech. The ship was to have been christened Bavaria, but shortly before the name was altered to Bayern, the German version of the name. After completing fitting out, she was commissioned into the German fleet on 4 August 1881 to begin sea trials. Her initial testing was interrupted by the annual fleet maneuvers, which were held from late August until 17 September. These lasted until 4 January 1882, at which point the navy decommissioned Bayern and placed her in reserve.

Bayern remained out of service for the first two years of her career; this in part had to do with the poor performance of her sister Sachsen in the fleet maneuvers of 1880. Among the problems associated with the Sachsen-class ships was a tendency to roll dangerously due to their flat bottoms, which greatly reduced the accuracy of their guns. The ships were also poorly armored, compared to their contemporaries. In addition, they were slow and suffered from poor maneuverability. Nevertheless, Bayern was recommissioned on 22 April 1884 to take part in the annual training routine with her three sisters, which served as the Panzerkorvette Division (Armored Corvette Division) of the fleet. At this time, the ship came under the command of Kapitän zur See (KzS) Bartholomäus von Werner. The four ships served as I Division in the 1884 fleet maneuvers, under the command of Konteradmiral Alexander von Monts. Following the conclusion of the maneuvers, Bayern was laid up for the winter on 18 October 1884. (Note: At that time, the German Navy decommissioned its ironclads over the winter months, generally from late in the year into April of the following year; it was not until 1891 that the fleet kept an ironclad squadron in commission during the winter months.)

The ship was recommissioned on 1 May 1885 for that year's training program, which included a cruise in the north Atlantic in the summer months that was intended to test the handling of the Sachsen-class ships in severe weather. During this period in commission, the ship was commanded by KzS Karl August Deinhard. Bayern remained with the fleet for the 1885 maneuvers, though she was joined only by the older ironclads Friedrich Carl and Hansa. The maneuvers were begun with a visit to Ålesund, Norway, after which the fleet went to the Baltic Sea for training exercises. During the exercises, Bayern ran aground in the Great Belt and was laid up for repairs at the Kaiserliche Werft in Kiel. After the work was completed, Bayern and Grille embarked on a training cruise in the Baltic along the German coast, as far as Memel. In October 1885, August von Thomsen, who had been appointed chief gunner, set up the first long range gunnery experiments on Bayern, which took place off the Curonian Spit. The ship's casemate guns could not fire to the ranges Thomsen had hoped, as the gun ports prevented them from elevating sufficiently. Thomsen went on to gain fame as "the father of German naval artillery." Beginning on 15 November, Bayern took up the role of flagship of the Reserve Division.

=== 1886–1892 ===
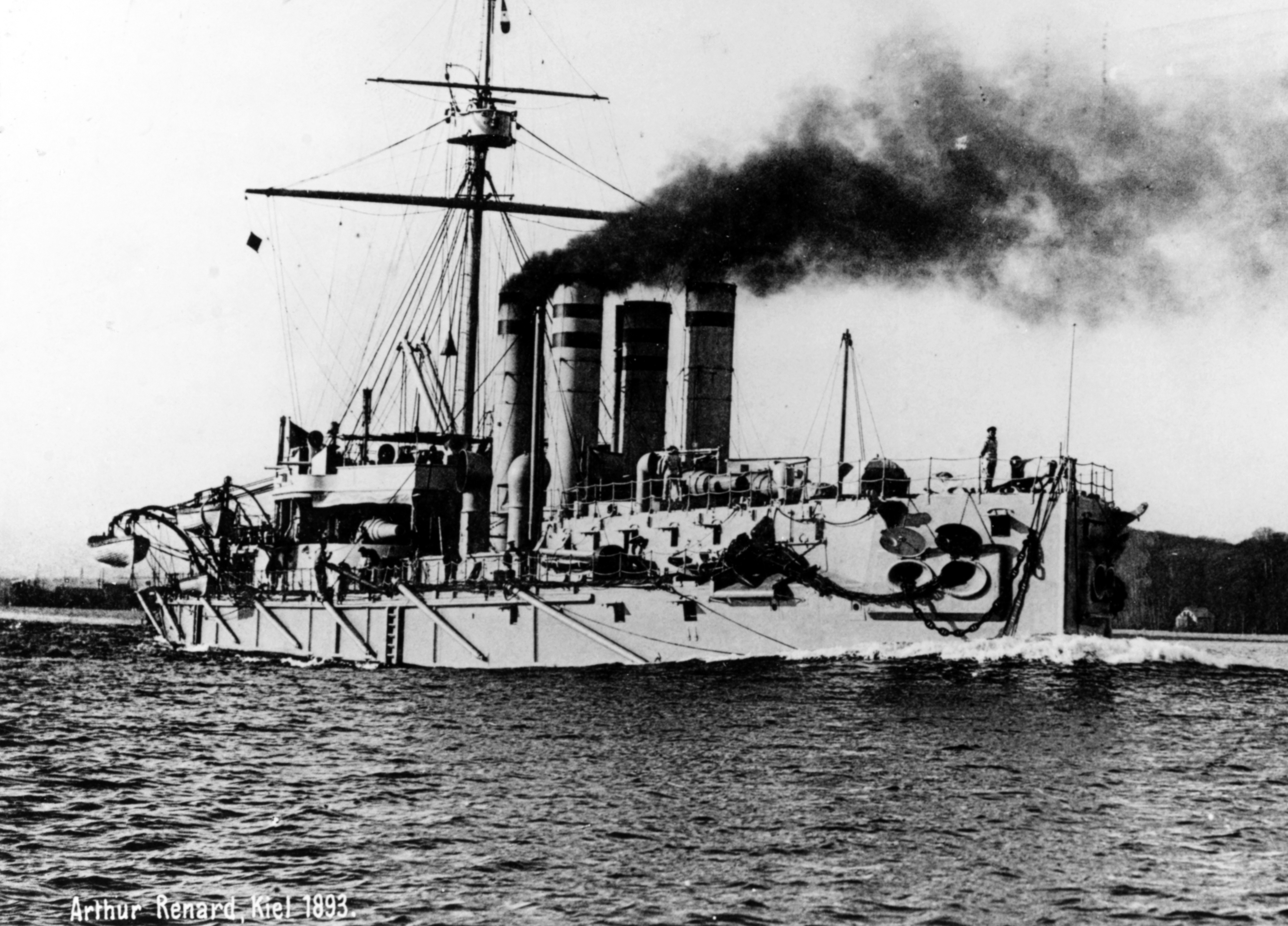
SMS Bayern circa 1893

Bayern's three sisters and the new ironclad Oldenburg comprised the training squadron for 1886. Bayern continued in her role as flagship through 15 May, when she was drydocked in Kiel for an extensive repair of her propulsion machinery. She also had electric lighting installed at this time, making her the first German warship so equipped. She was towed to the construction site of the Kaiser Wilhelm Canal on 3 June 1887 to be present for the beginning of work on the waterway that was to link Kiel with the North Sea. Bayern finally returned to active service on 21 November, again as the flagship of the Reserve Division. At that time, Bayern came under the command of KzS Franz von Kyckbusch. The ship served with the Panzergeschwader (Armored Squadron) from 23 May 1888, including during the annual fleet maneuvers, commanded by KzS Gustav von Senden-Bibran. Afterward, Bayern participated in a tour of the Baltic by the newly crowned Kaiser Wilhelm II. The fleet stopped in St. Petersburg, Russia, Stockholm, Sweden, and Copenhagen, Denmark, on the seventeen-day cruise. After returning, Bayern became the flagship of the newly constituted II Reserve Division on 14 September. At that time, KzS Max Plüddemann replaced Senden-Bibran as the ship's captain.

Bayern spent the next year out of service, and during this period, Korvettenkapitän August Gruner and then KzS Otto von Diederichs were briefly assigned to command the ship in February and March, respectively. She was recommissioned on 2 May 1890 to join what was now reorganized as the Manöverflotte (Maneuver Fleet). KzS Hugo von Schuckmann took command of the ship at that time. She would spend the next six years in the unit, alternating between it during the spring/summer training cycle and the Reserve Division from autumn to spring. She participated in the ceremonial transfer of the island of Helgoland from British to German control in the summer of 1890. The ship was also present for a visit by Wilhelm II to Denmark and Norway. She was present during the fleet maneuvers in September, where the entire eight-ship armored squadron simulated a Russian fleet blockading Kiel.

She remained with I Division in 1891; in January, KzS Richard Geissler took command of the ship. The next month, she contributed her landing party for a parade held in Kiel in honor of Field Marshall Helmuth von Moltke. In April, Schuckmann returned to command the vessel. The year's maneuvers simulated a two-front war against Russia and either France of Denmark. Following the conclusion of the exercises, KzS Hunold von Ahlefeld relieved Schuckmann. The ship remained in service with the Maneuver Squadron over the winter of 1891–1892, the first time the unit was kept in active service during the winter months. During this period, she served as the guard ship for Kiel. On 16 June 1892, the ship ran aground in the Kieler Förde, and she had to be drydocked at the Kaiserliche Werft in Kiel to repair her leaking hull. Bayern participated in the year's fleet maneuvers, which included three separate simulations. These consisted of French blockades of the German North Sea coast and a Russian attack on Kiel. In October, the ship was repainted with a new blue-gray paint scheme to test the new color. Later that year, she was involved in a collision with the unprotected cruiser Seeadler, though she was not seriously damaged in the accident.

=== 1893–1919 ===
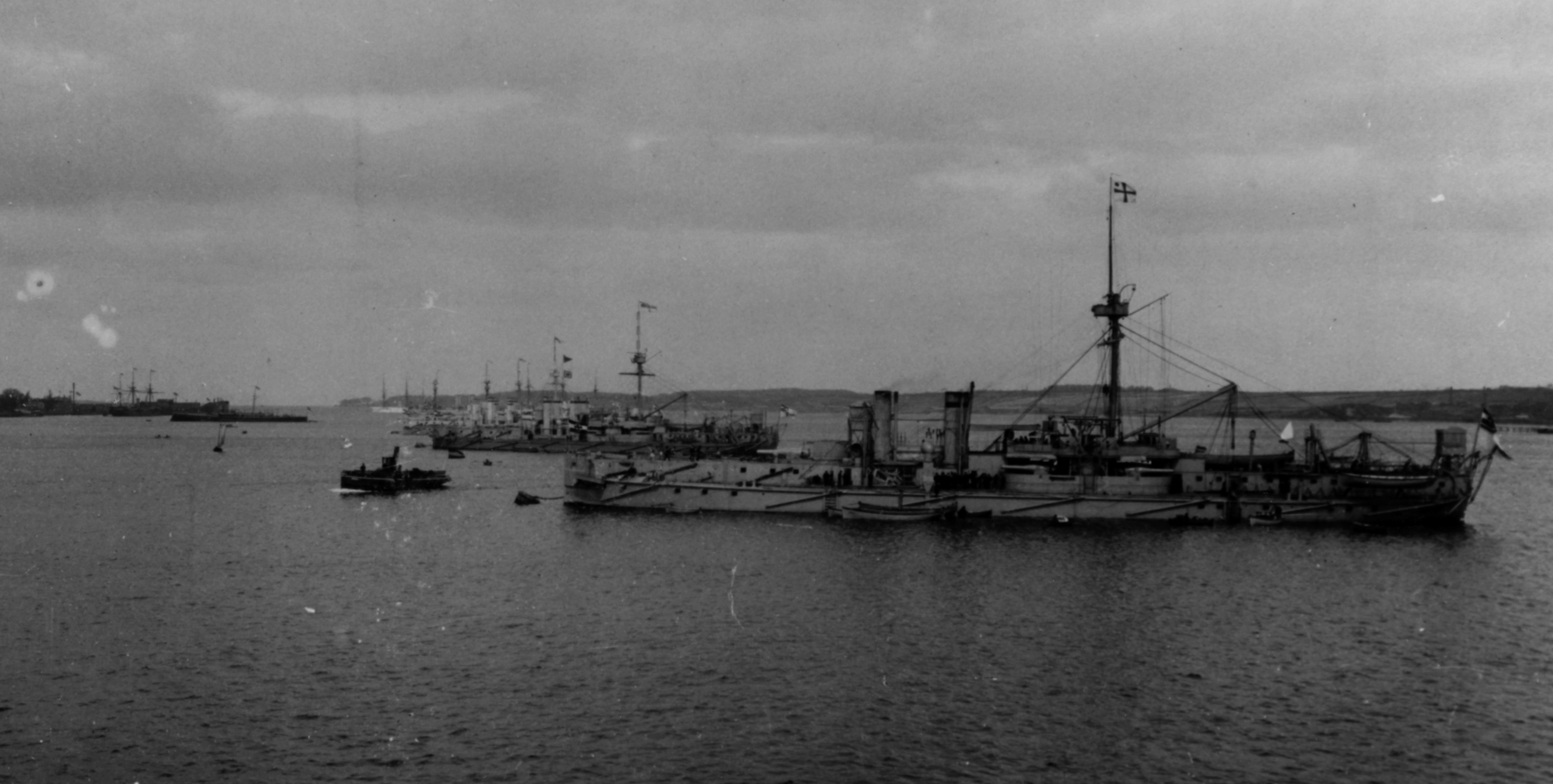
The German fleet at anchor in 1896; the four Sachsen-class ironclads are at right

Vice Admiral Wilhelm Schröder commanded the fleet maneuvers of 1893, which simulated a protracted campaign against a superior French fleet. After the end of the exercises, KzS Hermann Kirchhoff replaced Ahlefeld as the ship's captain. Bayern and her three sisters served as the Russian Baltic Fleet during the 1894 maneuvers. The four Sachsen-class ships were transferred to II Division before the winter cruise of 1894–1895, following the completion of the four Brandenburg-class battleships. The German fleet now possessed two homogeneous divisions of four ships each. After the conclusion of the exercises, the fleet was reorganized on 21 September and Bayern was assigned to II Division of the main fleet; she was joined there by her three sisters, while the Brandenburgs composed I Division. She acted as the temporary flagship of Vizeadmiral (vice admiral) Hans von Koester from September to November. The two divisions steamed to Orkney and the Shetland Islands in the spring of 1895. Bayern joined a very large fleet review on 21 July 1895 for the opening of the Kaiser Wilhelm Canal, which connected Kiel to the North Sea. During the international review, officers from a French warship invited officers from Bayern to a dinner aboard their vessel, despite a period of diplomatic tension between the two countries. The Autumn 1895 maneuvers simulated a high-seas battle between I and II Divisions in the North Sea, followed by combined maneuvers with the rest of the fleet in the Baltic.

KzS Carl Derzewski briefly took command of the ship following the conclusion of the maneuvers. Bayern was decommissioned on 6 October for a major reconstruction. She was taken into drydock at the Schichau-Werke in Danzig for the work, which lasted into mid-1897. The ship's old wrought iron and teak armor was replaced with new Krupp nickel-steel armor. The four funnels were trunked into a single large funnel and new engines were also installed, which increased the ship's speed to 15.4 kn (28.5 km/h; 17.7 mph). The ship's 8.7 cm guns were replaced with quick-firing 8.8 cm (3.5 in) SK L/30 guns and four 3.7 cm (1.5 in) autocannons. Bayern's three sisters were similarly modified between 1896 and 1899. In mid-1897, Bayern carried out sea trials, though she was not placed in full commission until 28 May 1898. At that time, she came under the command of KzS Georg Scheder, and she was assigned to II Division, though she remained there only until 17 September. She temporarily served as the flagship of I Squadron from 3 to 16 November and then from 17 December to 28 February 1899, which was at that time commanded by now-Vizeadmiral Thomsen. The 1899 fleet exercises included a cruise to Lisbon, Portugal. On 12 September, she came to the aid of the aviso Wacht, which had broken down after a boiler explosion; she towed the disabled aviso back to Kiel for repairs. On 20 October, Bayern became the flagship of II Division, and from 14 December to 27 January 1900, she once again served as the I Squadron flagship, now under Vizeadmiral Paul Hoffmann. On 12 February, the ship was decommissioned in Wilhelmshaven.

Bayern was moved to Kiel in late 1903, where she served as part of the Baltic Sea Naval Station from 2 January 1904. She was reduced to I Reserve in 1906, and then reduced again to II Reserve in 1909. The ship was stricken from the naval register on 19 February 1910, and thereafter she was converted into a target ship for the fleet and served in this capacity off Stollergrund in the Kieler Förde. In 1913, during the first Kiel flight week, Bayern was used as a target for aircraft; one of the planes scored two hits on the ship during their fourth and fifth passes, once on the upper deck and the second on her conning tower. The ship remained in service as a floating target through World War I. On 5 May 1919, after the end of the war, Bayern was sold for scrapping and was broken up in Kiel.
