= SMS Hansa (1872) =

Armored corvette of the German Imperial Navy

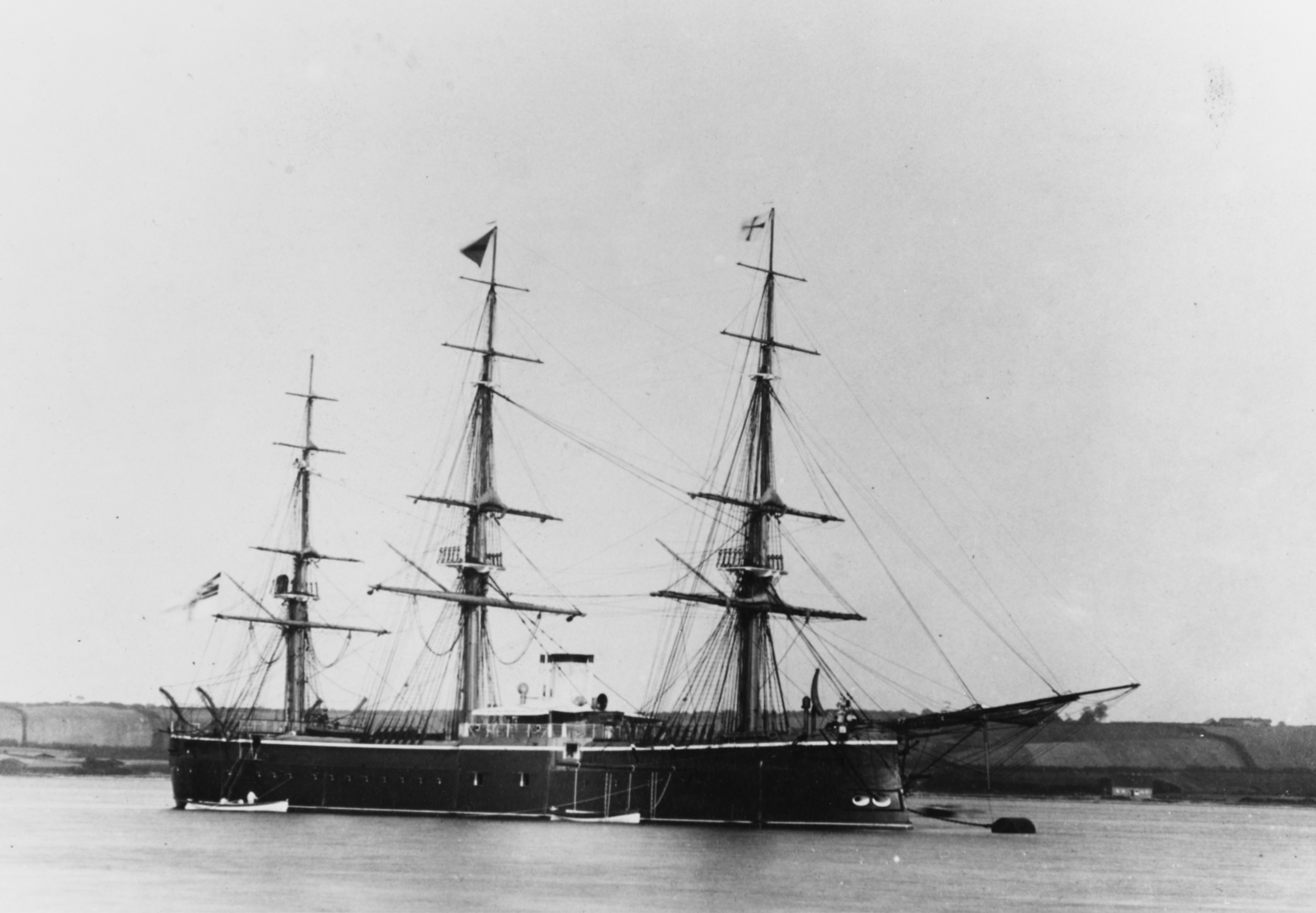
- Hansa in Kiel in the 1880s

Class overview
- Operators: Imperial German Navy
- Preceded by: König Wilhelm
- Succeeded by: Preussen class
- Completed: 1
- Scrapped: 1

History

German Empire
- Name: SMS Hansa
- Builder: Kaiserliche Werft, Danzig
- Laid down: 1868
- Launched: 26 October 1872
- Commissioned: 19 May 1875
- Stricken: 6 August 1888
- Fate: Broken up, 1906

General characteristics
- Type: Armored corvette
- Displacement: Design: 3,950 t (3,890 long tons); Full load: 4,404 t (4,334 long tons)
- Length: 73.50 m (241.1 ft)
- Beam: 14.10 m (46.3 ft)
- Draft: 5.74 m (18.8 ft)
- Installed power: 4 × boilers; 450 nhp
- Propulsion: 1 × single-expansion steam engine; 1 × screw propeller
- Sail plan: Ship rig, 1,760 m^{2} (18,900 sq ft)
- Speed: 12 knots (22 km/h; 14 mph)
- Range: 1,330 nmi (2,460 km; 1,530 mi) at 10 knots (19 km/h; 12 mph)
- Boats & landing craft carried: 10
- Crew: 28 officers; 371 enlisted men
- Armament: 8 x 21 cm (8.3 in) L/19 guns
- Armor: Belt: 114 to 152 mm (4.5 to 6.0 in); Battery: 114 mm (4.5 in)

SMS Hansa (Note: "SMS" stands for "Seiner Majestät Schiff", or "His Majesty's Ship".) was a German ironclad warship built in 1868–1875. She was the first ironclad built in Germany; all previous German ironclads had been built in foreign shipyards. She was named after the Hanseatic League, known in Germany simply as Hanse, Latinized Hansa. The ship was launched in October 1872 and commissioned into the German Imperial Navy (Kaiserliche Marine) in May 1875. Designed as for coastal bombardment, Hansa was classed as an armored corvette and armed with eight 21 cm (8.3 in) guns in a central battery.

Hansa saw little use in her first years of service, and only took part in fleet exercises in the 1875 training year. She made a major overseas cruise to Central and South America from 1878 to 1880, during which time she protected German nationals in the region during the War of the Pacific between Peru, Bolivia, and Chile. In 1884, it was found that her iron hull was badly corroded, which rendered the ship unfit for further active service. She was therefore removed from active duty and used for a variety of secondary roles. From 1884 to 1888, she served as a guard ship in Kiel, where she also trained engine and boiler room personnel. The ship also took part in further fleet exercises in 1885 and 1886. In poor condition by 1888, she was stricken from the naval register and used as a barracks ship in Kiel. She was moved to Mönkeberg in 1905, where she continued to train boiler room personnel until 1906, when she was sold to ship-breakers and dismantled for scrap.

== Design ==
Development of a small armored corvette began in 1861, shortly after the first ironclad warships entered service in the British and French fleets. The Prussians initially envisioned using the armored vessel to reduce coastal fortifications, as the French ironclad floating batteries had done at the Battle of Kinburn in 1855. Work on the concept proceeded slowly, and the Prussians initially purchased as series of ironclads from British and French shipyards. The design evolved over this period, eventually settling on a casemate ship similar to the British Edward Reed-designed HMS Pallas.

=== General characteristics and machinery ===
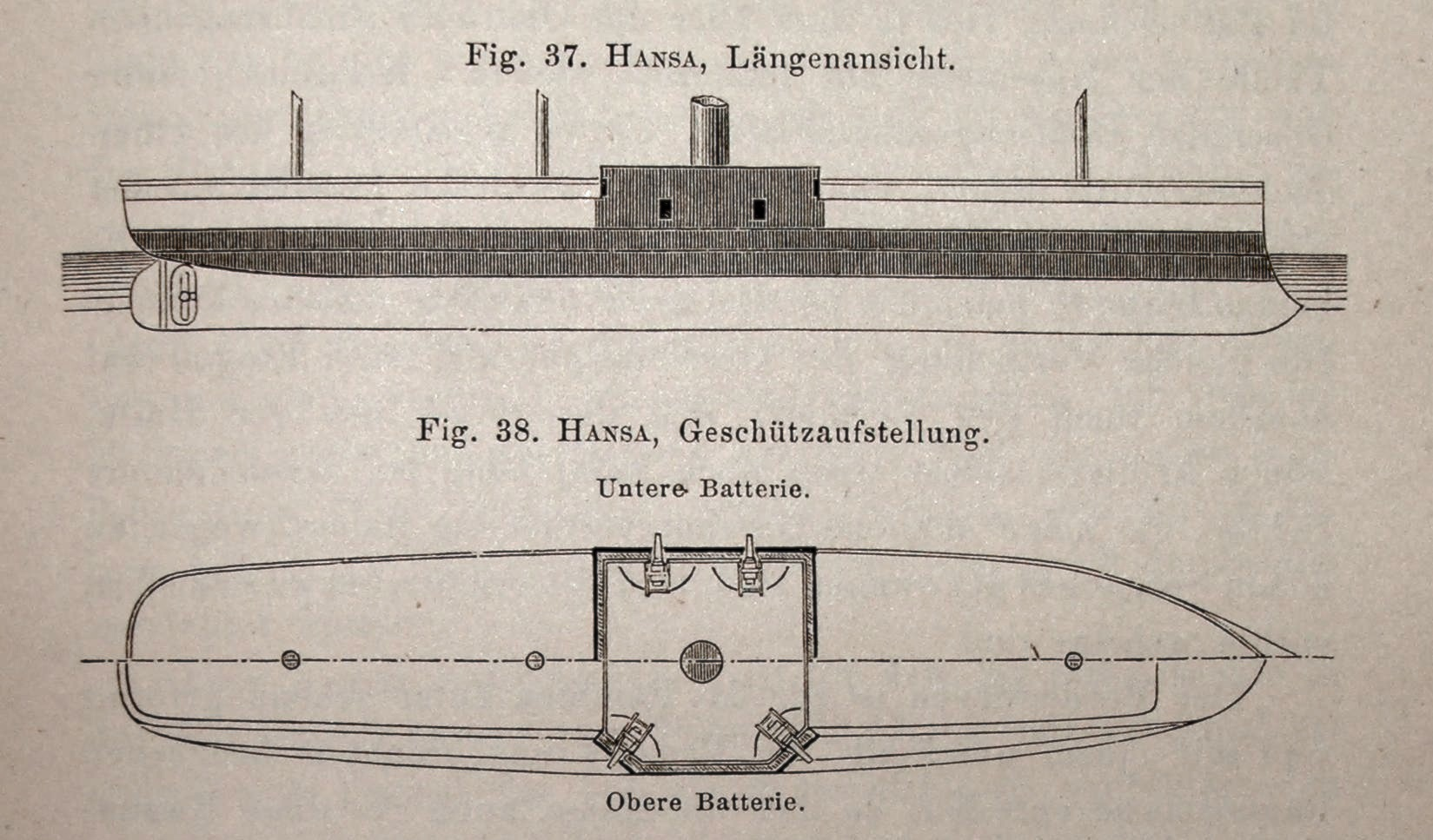
Plan and profile drawing of SMS Hansa

Hansa was 71.73 meters (235.3 ft) long at the waterline and 73.50 m (241.1 ft) long overall. She had a beam of 14.10 m (46.3 ft) and a draft of 5.74 m (18.8 ft) forward and 6.80 m (22.3 ft) aft. The ship was designed to displace 3,950 metric tons (3,890 long tons; 4,350 short tons) at a normal loading, and up to 4,404 t (4,334 long tons; 4,855 short tons) at full load. The ship's hull was formed with transverse iron frames and mixed iron and timber construction. The underwater portion of the hull was plated with copper to reduce fouling. It contained six watertight compartments.

The German navy found the ship to be very stiff in her sea-keeping qualities. Steering was controlled by a single rudder. Hansa was very maneuverable and was easily controlled while under sail; under steam the ship remained highly maneuverable but control suffered. The ship's crew numbered 28 officers and 371 enlisted men. She carried a number of smaller boats aboard, including two launches, one pinnace, two cutters, one yawl, and one dinghy. The ship also carried an unknown number of picket boats and barges. Anti-torpedo nets were briefly fitted to the ship from 1885 to 1888.

Hansa was powered by a single horizontal three-cylinder single-expansion steam engine built by AG Vulcan in Stettin. The engine drove a single three-bladed screw that was 6 m (20 ft) in diameter. Steam, at a pressure of at 2 standard atmospheres (200 kPa), was supplied by four trunk boilers in a single boiler room. The boilers were ducted into a single large funnel that could be retracted when the ship was operated under sail. The powerplant was rated at 450 nominal horsepower with a top speed of 12 knots (22 km/h; 14 mph). On trials, her propulsion system managed 3,275 indicated horsepower (2,442 kW) and 12.7 knots (23.5 km/h; 14.6 mph). The ship carried 310 t (310 long tons; 340 short tons) of coal for the boilers, which enabled a maximum range of 1,330 nautical miles (2,460 km; 1,530 mi) at a cruising speed of 10 knots (19 km/h; 12 mph). Hansa was fitted with a full sailing rig to supplement the steam engine, and it had a sail area of 1,760 m^{2} (18,900 sq ft).

=== Armament and armor ===
Hansa was armed with a main battery of eight 21 cm RK L/19 hooped guns of 20.95-centimeter (8.25 in) caliber, each of which was provided with 110 rounds of ammunition. The guns were placed in a two-story arrangement amidships; four were mounted in a broadside casemate, two on either side of the ship. The other four guns were mounted in casemates on the corners of the lower casemate, which gave the ship a degree of end-on fire capability. The lower guns could depress to −5° and elevate to 13°; at maximum elevation, the guns could reach targets out to 3,200 m (3,500 yd). The upper guns had a wider range of elevation; they could depress to −8° and elevate to 14°. At maximum elevation, the guns had a range of 5,700 m (6,200 yd).

Hansa's armor consisted of teak-backed wrought iron, which was manufactured in Great Britain. Her armored belt was 152 mm (6 in) thick amidships, where it protected the ship's vitals. On the bow and stern, the belt was reduced to 114 mm (4.5 in) in thickness. The entire belt was backed with 306 mm (12 in) of timber. The casemates were armored with 114 mm thick sloping iron plates. The lower battery casemate had 114 mm thick transverse armored bulkheads on either end of the side armor.

== Service history ==
=== Construction and initial service ===
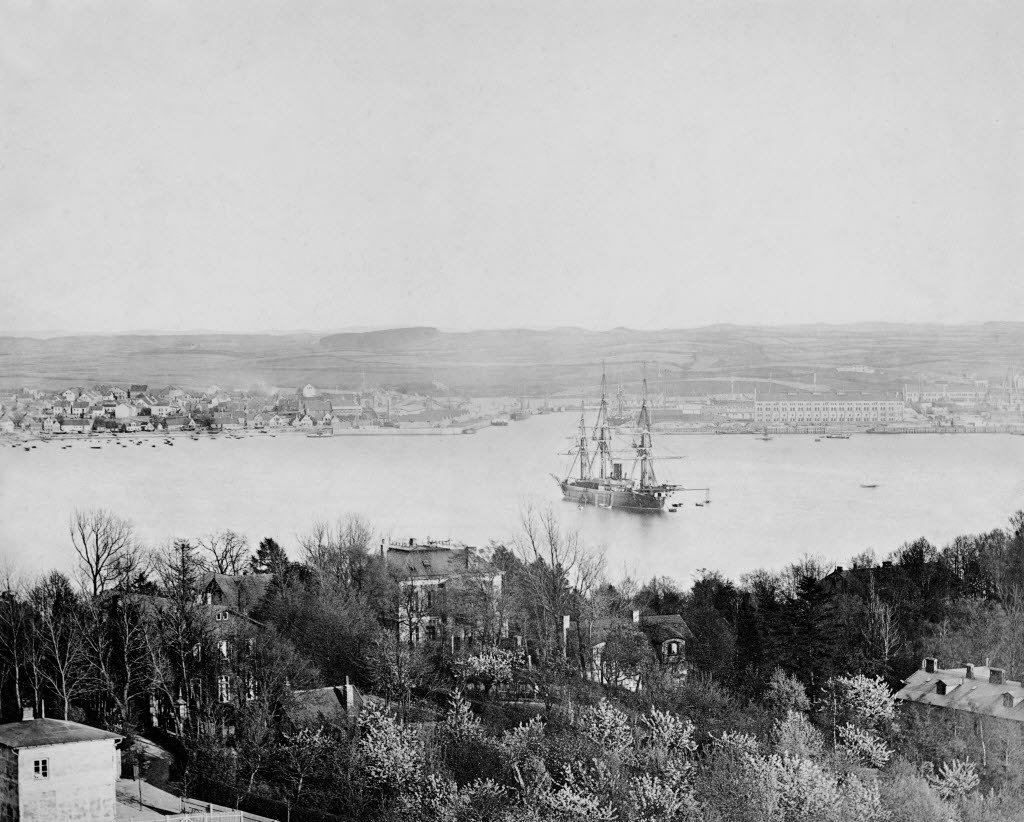
Hansa in Kiel

Hansa was laid down at the Königliche Werft (Royal Dockyard) in Danzig on 16 November 1868. She was the first ironclad warship to be built in a German shipyard; her predecessors had all been built in French and British shipyards. Work on the vessel was slowed, in part due to the lengthy process required to properly dry the wood used to construct her hull, but also because of the Franco-Prussian War of 1870–1871. The ship was launched on 26 October 1872, and General Hermann von Tresckow, the commander of IX Corps, gave the speech at the launching ceremony. This was the first such speech given at a launch ceremony of a Prussian or German warship. She was then towed to the AG Vulcan shipyard in Stettin for fitting out work on 19 August 1873. This was completed in December 1874, and the ship was then towed to Swinemünde.

From there, she was to sail to Kiel under the command of Kapitän zur See (KzS—Captain at Sea) Adolph Berger, the director of the naval artillery depot in Kiel, though without having been commissioned. On 16 December, while attempting to leave Swinemünde, the ship ran aground and had to return to port. She was not damaged, but she was escorted by the transport ship SS Eider for the voyage out to sea on 31 December. After arriving in Kiel on 3 January 1875, she was taken into a floating dry dock for final fitting-out on 24 February. Hansa was finally commissioned into the German fleet on 19 May, two and a half years after her launch. By comparison, all of the earlier foreign-built ironclads were completed in less than a year after their launching; the delays between launching and completion with Hansa were largely the result of the inexperience of the shipyards with building ironclad warships.

Through the 1870s, the German armored fleet typically saw active service during the summer months. Over the winter, most of the vessels were placed in reserve with one or two kept in a state of reduced commission as guard ships. Hansa joined the summer Training Squadron for 1875 on 3 June; the unit also included the ironclads Kronprinz, König Wilhelm, and Kaiser. The ships remained in German waters and included a cruise to Rügen in early July with Crown Prince Frederick aboard one of the vessels. The ships then took part in training exercises in Danzig Bay and were visited by Stosch. At the end of the training cycle, the fleet held a naval review for Kaiser Wilhelm I on 22–23 September. The next day, the Training Squadron was disbanded and Hansa was decommissioned on 4 November.

=== Overseas deployment ===
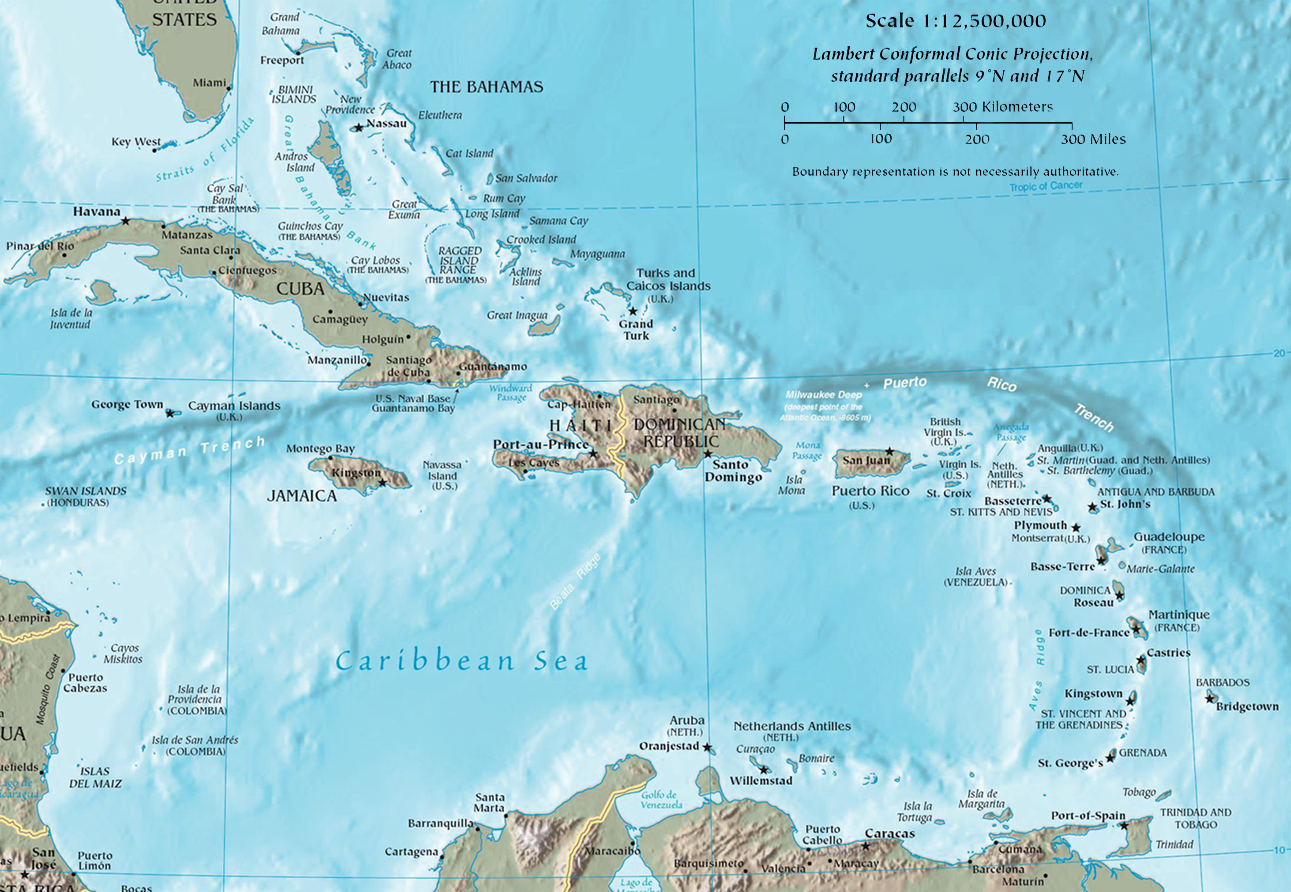
Map of the Caribbean showing many of the ports Hansa visited during her deployment

She remained out of commission until 22 July 1878, when she returned to service for a deployment to the West Indies later that year. Upon recommissioning that day, she was placed under the command of Korvettenkapitän (KK—Corvette Captain) Karl Eduard Heusner. She was initially placed in the first category of reserve on 21 August, before preparations for the voyage began on 1 October. She departed Kiel on 31 October and arrived in the area in Charlotte Amalie in the Danish West Indies on 3 January 1879. After arriving there, she received orders to sail to Venezuela, where domestic unrest threatened Europeans living in the country. There, she met the German steam corvette Nymphe in La Guaira. The two ships acted to protect German nationals in Puerto Cabello, and also came to the aid of United States citizens in La Guaira. While in the latter port, Hansa's engines broke down after weighing anchor; she only avoided colliding with other ships in the harbor by the crew's skillful seamanship and quickly transitioning to sail power. Nymphe left the area on 28 January but Hansa remained off Venezuela until 20 February, by which time it had become apparent that the unrest was nearing its end.

After leaving Venezuelan waters, Hansa sailed for Curaçao in the Lesser Antilles, where she remained until the end of March. She thereafter toured ports in the Greater Antilles, visited Greytown, Nicaragua, Colón in what was then still Colombia, and Saint Thomas in the Danish West Indies. From Saint Thomas, she departed to make the voyage south to visit South America's east coast. Along the way, she stopped in Bahia from 22 to 30 June, and while there, she received orders to sail to the west coast of the continent. By that time, the War of the Pacific between Peru, Chile, and Bolivia had broken out, which threatened the security of Germans and other foreign nationals in the country. She passed through Montevideo, Uruguay, from 1 to 13 July and arrived in Valparaíso, Chile, on 19 August. From there, she continued on to Callao, Peru. By that time, the Peruvian government had seized the German steamer SS Luxor of the Kosmos Reederei company for carrying contraband, and processed the seizure through a prize court. Following Hansa's arrival, she received the steamer's crew, who had been sheltering aboard a British gunboat. But the Germans were unable to secure the vessel's release, so on 8 September Hansa left the port. (Note: Peru eventually released the vessel in January 1880, citing the loyalty of the German expatriate community in the country.) Heusner was under strict orders to remain neutral while in the region, and he lacked the necessary force to take direct action in any event. (Note: During the Cantonal Revolution in Spain in 1873, Reinhold von Werner significantly exceeded his authority by directly engaging the rebel faction with a German and British force he commanded. His actions prompted an uproar in Germany and upon his return, Otto von Bismarck relieved him of command and forbade any further attempts at gunboat diplomacy.) Meanwhile, the German naval command commissioned the steam corvette Freya and the gunboat Hyäne to reinforce Hansa.

Following the Chilean victory in the Battle of Angamos on 8 October, the Chilean Navy planned to bombard Callao, which had been declared an open city. Heusner protested the planned attack, which led the Chilean government to cancel it. Hansa cruised off the Peruvian and Chilean coast through June 1880, and throughout this period, she repeatedly sent landing parties ashore in Callao, Lima, and Arica to protect Germans in those cities. Hyäne arrived in Valparaíso on 1 February 1880 and Freya joined the German ships there on 3 March. The war soon turned decisively in Chile's favor, which permitted the Germans to recall Hyäne on 3 April, followed quickly by Freya on 14 April. The steam corvette Bismarck arrived in the area on 26 May, the same day that Chile defeated Bolivia in the Battle of Tacna, knocking the latter out of the war. Bismarck operated with Hansa until July, when the latter vessel began the voyage home. In mid-August, the steam corvette Ariadne met Hansa in Coronel, Chile, where they officially transferred responsibility for the region on 11 August. Hansa thereafter departed for Germany, eventually arriving back in Kiel on 22 October. There, she was decommissioned on 8 November.

=== Later career ===
After being decommissioned, the ship underwent an overhaul and then remained out of service until February 1884. During this period, the navy considered activating the ship to send her to the eastern Mediterranean during the Anglo-Egyptian War, but the plan came to nothing. She was recommissioned again on 22 February 1884 to serve as the guard ship in Kiel, and as a training ship for boiler and engine room crews. The ship carried out several short training crews during this period, and on 28–29 June, she embarked Prince Wilhelm and Prince Heinrich, the kaiser's grandsons for a cruise with the Ironclad Training Squadron. After steaming back to Kiel on 10 August, she resumed short training cruises. On 14 October, she went to assist the stranded corvette Gneisenau, which had run aground off Lolland. That month, KzS Conrad Dietert became the ship's commander. Hansa took part in the fleet's training activities in the Baltic and North Seas for 1885 and 1886. In 1885, she served with the ironclad Friedrich Carl and the new ironclad Bayern, but in 1886, she was transferred to II Division, along with four screw corvettes. The ship joined the Ironclad Squadron on 7 June 1887 for ceremonies marking the beginning of construction of the Kaiser Wilhelm Canal, after which she conducted shooting practice and training cruises.

By early 1888, it was found that her hull was badly corroded; this stemmed from the lengthy construction period, during which the iron had already begun to corrode. She was formally stricken from the naval register on 6 August 1888, by which time her hull had deteriorated further and she was no longer capable of going to sea. She was then converted for use as a floating barracks for the II Torpedo Division in Kiel, which included installing central heating and electrical lights. She filled this role until 1905. Hansa was then moved to Mönkeberg, hulked, and used to train boiler stokers. The ship did not last long in this service, and was sold in March 1906 for 96,000 marks. Hansa was broken up later that year in Swinemünde.
