= SMS Gazelle (1859) =

1859 Arcona-class corvette of the Prussian Navy

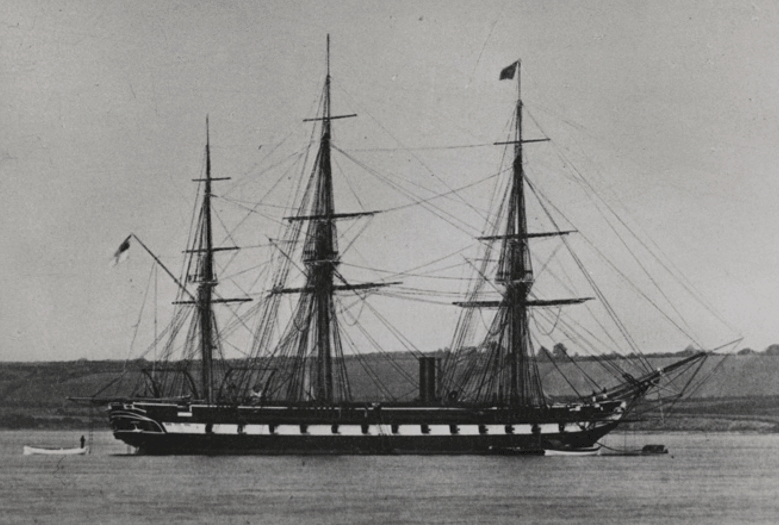

History

Prussia
- Name: SMS Gazelle
- Namesake: Gazelle
- Builder: Königliche Werft, Danzig
- Laid down: 1855
- Launched: 19 December 1859
- Completed: 22 May 1861
- Commissioned: 15 May 1862
- Decommissioned: 6 July 1881
- Stricken: 8 January 1884
- Fate: Sold for scrap, 1906

General characteristics
- Class & type: Arcona-class frigate
- Displacement: 2,391 t (2,353 long tons)
- Length: 71.95 m (236 ft 1 in)
- Beam: 13 m (42 ft 8 in)
- Draft: 5.55 m (18 ft 3 in)
- Installed power: 4 × fire-tube boilers; 1,320 PS (1,300 ihp)
- Propulsion: 1 × marine steam engine; 1 × screw propeller
- Sail plan: Full-rigged ship
- Speed: 12 knots (22 km/h; 14 mph)
- Range: 1,150 nmi (2,130 km; 1,320 mi) at 11 knots (20 km/h; 13 mph)
- Complement: 35 officers; 345 enlisted men
- Armament: 6 × 68-pounder guns; 20 × 36 pounder guns

SMS Gazelle was an Arcona-class screw-driven frigate of the Prussian Navy built in the 1850s. The class comprised five ships, and were the first major steam-powered warships ordered for the Prussian Navy. The ships were ordered as part of a major construction program to strengthen the nascent Prussian fleet, under the direction of Prince Adalbert, and were intended to provide defense against the Royal Danish Navy. Gazelle was armed with a battery of twenty-six guns, and was capable of steaming at a speed of 12 knots (22 km/h; 14 mph). Gazelle was laid down in 1855, launched in 1859, and commissioned in 1862.

The ship's first major operation began in late 1862, when she was chosen to carry the ratified treaties with Japan and China that had been concluded by the Eulenburg expedition. While in the latter country in early 1864, the Second Schleswig War against Denmark had broken out, and Gazelle attacked Danish merchant shipping in Asia, capturing four prizes before the war ended. She eventually arrived home in 1865. Gazelle was mobilized during the Austro-Prussian War of 1866, but saw no action during the short conflict that resulted in the creation of the Prussian-dominated North German Confederation. She cruised in the Mediterranean Sea on a training voyage for naval cadets in 1866–1867, now a warship of the North German Federal Navy.

Gazelle was not recommissioned during the Franco-Prussian War, owing to the vast superiority of the French fleet. Now in the service of the Kaiserliche Marine (Imperial Navy) of unified Germany, Gazelle made a cruise to the Caribbean Sea from 1871 to 1873, sailing alone, at times with her sister ship Vineta, and ending the voyage with a larger squadron. From 1874 to 1876, Gazelle embarked on a major overseas voyage for scientific purposes, including part of Germany's observation of the 1874 transit of Venus. The scientific team aboard the ship also conducted ethnographic, zoological, and oceanographic research during the cruise. Gazelle was sent to the Mediterranean in 1877 in response to heightened tensions that eventually resulted in the outbreak of the Russo-Turkish War in 1878. The ship saw limited service in the late 1870s and early 1880s, primarily as a training ship, before being struck from the naval register in 1884. She was used as a barracks ship until 1906, when she was sold to ship breakers.

== Design ==
In the immediate aftermath of the First Schleswig War against Denmark, Prince Adalbert began drawing up plans for the future of the Prussian Navy; he also secured the Jade Treaty that saw the port of Wilhelmshaven transferred to Prussia from the Duchy of Oldenburg, and which provided the Prussian fleet with an outlet on the North Sea. Adalbert called for a force of three screw frigates and six screw corvettes to protect Prussian maritime trade in the event of another war with Denmark. Design work was carried out between 1854 and 1855, and the first two ships were authorized in November 1855; a further pair was ordered in June 1860, and the final member of the class was ordered in February 1866.

Gazelle was 71.95 meters (236 ft 1 in) long overall and had a beam of 13 m (42 ft 8 in) and a draft of 5.55 m (18 ft 3 in) forward. She displaced 1,928 metric tons (1,898 long tons) as designed and 2,391 t (2,353 long tons) at full load. The ship had short forecastle and sterncastle decks. Her superstructure consisted primarily of a small deckhouse aft. She had a crew of 35 officers and 345 enlisted men.

Her propulsion system consisted of a single horizontal single-expansion steam engine driving a single screw propeller, with steam supplied by four coal-burning fire-tube boilers. Exhaust was vented through a single funnel located amidships. Gazelle was rated to steam at a top speed of 8 knots (15 km/h; 9.2 mph), but she significantly exceeded this speed, reaching 12 knots (22 km/h; 14 mph) from 1,320 metric horsepower (1,300 ihp). The ship had a cruising radius of about 1,150 nautical miles (2,130 km; 1,320 mi) at a speed of 11 knots (20 km/h; 13 mph). To supplement the steam engine on long voyages abroad, she carried a full-ship rig with a total surface area of 2,200 m^{2} (24,000 sq ft). The screw could be retracted while cruising under sail.

Gazelle was armed with a battery of six 68-pounder guns and twenty 36-pounder guns. By 1870, she had been rearmed with a uniform battery of seventeen 15 cm (5.9 in) RK L/22 guns; later in her career, the number of these guns was reduced to eight.

== Service history ==
=== Construction and initial operations ===
After being ordered on 2 November 1855, the ship was laid down on 3 December at the Royal Dockyard in Danzig. Work on the ship, which was named for the species of antelope, proceeded slowly owing to the very limited naval budgets of the period, along with delays in the delivery of her propulsion system. The lengthy construction time had the positive effect of allowing the ship's timbers to properly season before the hull was completed. She was launched without ceremony on 19 December 1859, and despite the pressing need for a warship to be sent to the Mediterranean Sea in response to the unrest in Italy during the unification of Italy, work continued slowly. The ship's first officer arrived on 5 June 1860 to oversee completion of the ship, including her rigging. Further delays were caused by the unreliable engines manufactured by AG Vulcan, which had only been founded in 1857. The originally planned training cruise scheduled for 1861 had to be cancelled, and the sail frigate Amazone was sent instead. (Note: Amazone was to sink in a storm during this voyage.)

Gazelle was eventually completed on 22 May 1861, and commissioned into the Navy almost a year later on 15 May 1862. Her first commander was Korvettenkapitän (KK—Corvette Captain) Eduard Heldt, who captained the ship during her initial sea trials and maiden voyage. Her full complement of sailors arrived by 3 July, along with the naval cadets of the 1860 and 1861 crew years. In early August, Gazelle departed on her first overseas trip, a training cruise to Brest, France, which she reached on 31 August. After a two-week stay, the ship departed Brest on 15 September, bound for Neufahrwasser, Prussia. Gazelle was intended to be deployed to the Black Sea in 1863—a right extended to several European powers after the Crimean War on 1853–1856—diplomatic events in East Asia saw these plans changed. The Eulenburg expedition, carried out aboard the frigate Arcona, had resulted in the signing of treaties with Siam, Qing China, and Japan. Japan demanded that a proper warship return to complete the ratification purpose, and Gazelle was chosen for the mission.

=== 1862–1865 overseas cruise ===
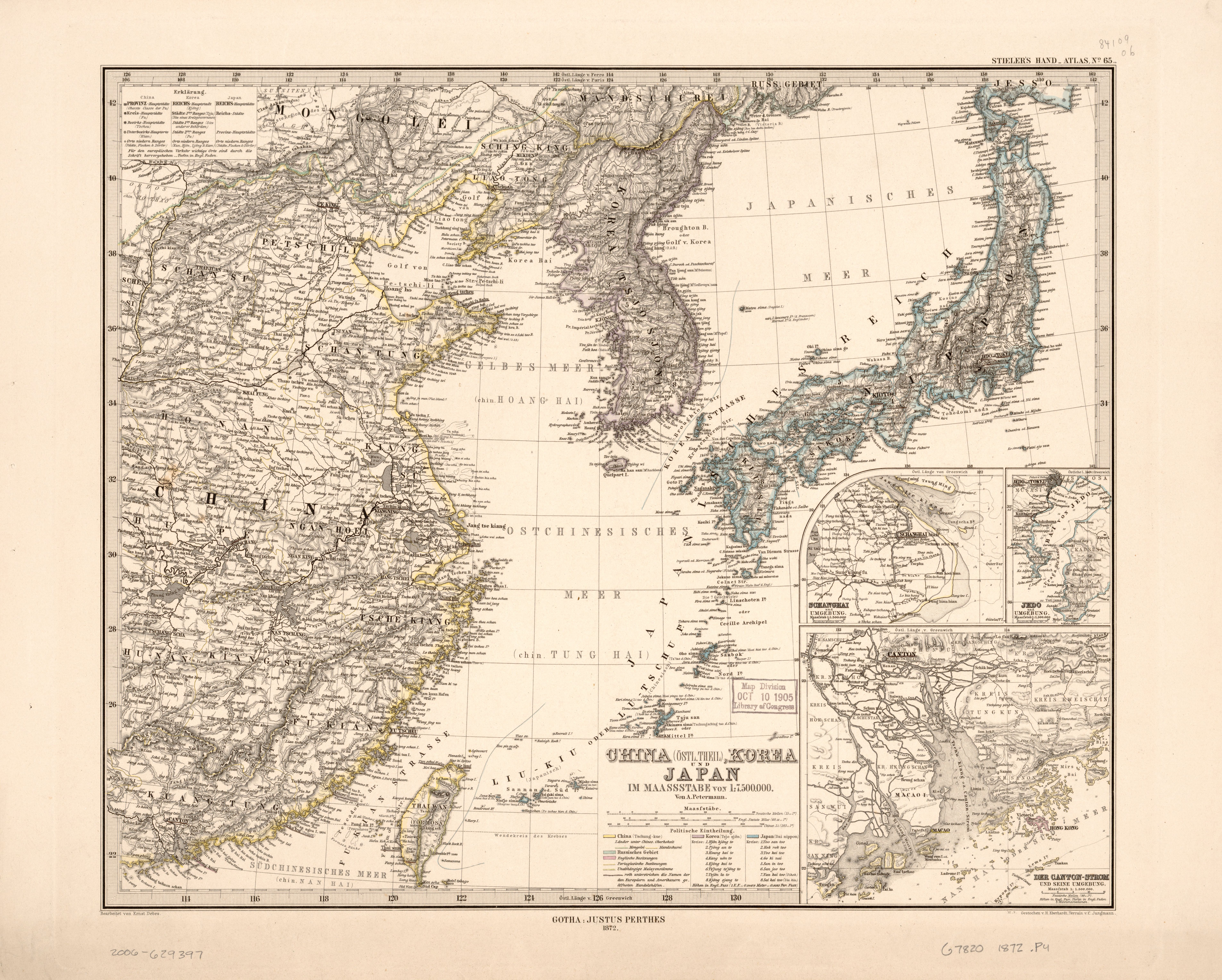
1872 map of China, Japan, and Korea

Gazelle received orders to embark on the voyage to the Far East on 23 October 1862, and she departed from Neufahrwasser on 9 November. By 21 November, she had reached Gibraltar, where the crew visited a recently erected monument to the Prussian sailors who had died in the Battle of Tres Forcas in 1856. While still in Gibraltar in December, Heldt was replaced by KK Arthur von Bothwell, who was to captain the ship for the rest of the cruise. (Note: The change of command had not been planned; Bothwell had been the adjutant to Admiral Prince Adalbert, but the two had had a falling out, and Bothwell was dismissed to relieve Heldt, who in turn became Adalbert's adjutant.) Gazelle got underway again in late January 1863, sailing initially west to Brazil, arriving in Rio de Janeiro in February. There, Emperor Pedro I of Brazil visited the ship. Gazelle thereafter sailed back across the Atlantic, passing the Cape of Good Hope, stopping in Anjer on the island of Sumatra in the Dutch East Indies, before arriving in Singapore on 31 May. The ship remained here until early July, when she sailed for Hong Kong, China, which she reached on 10 July. There, the Prussian consul general, Guido von Rehfues, came aboard the ship with a staff of five men. Rehfeus was to carry out the formal ratification of the treaties. Gazelle departed on 15 July, passing through Amoy on the way to Shanghai, where she remained from 21 to 30 July. The ship then sailed for Yokohama, Japan, arriving on 8 August.

Upon arriving in Yokohama, Gazelle found a diplomatic crisis. The isolationist Tokugawa shogunate had abrogated all foreign treaties and had begun expelling foreigners from the country. A civil conflict had also broken out between some of the daimyos, and the Satsuma Domain had opened hostilities with the British Royal Navy. The British squadron left Yokohama the day that Gazelle arrived; the city had a significant European settlement, and several French warships took responsibility for defending it, sending some 300 men ashore with field guns. The French commander requested that Bothwell support them, so Gazelle contributed a landing party of 107 men and two 12-pounder guns to reinforce the garrison. Soon thereafter, the British bombarded Kagoshima, inflicting significant damage and hardening Japanese anger at the Europeans. Bothwell sent another fifty men ashore to further strengthen the force in Yokohama. In the meantime, Rehfues attempted to negotiate a settlement, which was reached in November. The Japanese revoked their ban on foreign residents, and on 2 January 1864, Gazelle arrived in Tokyo, where the treaty that had been signed during the Eulenberg mission was formally ratified on 21 January. Later that day, after the Prussian ambassador Max von Brandt arrived, Gazelle sailed from Tokyo, stopping in Yokohama and Nagasaki on the way to Shanghai, where she stayed from 8 March to 6 April.

While in Shanghai, Bothwell learned of the start of the Second Schleswig War between Prussia and Denmark; he received orders to begin cruiser warfare against Danish merchant shipping. The ship disembarked the Prussian diplomatic delegation at Tianjin, who then traveled to Beijing; Gazelle thereafter began searching for Danish ships to attack. Her first cruise in Chinese waters was unsuccessful, but on her second voyage to Japan, she captured schooner Falk on 25 April; the brig Caroline of Schleswig-Holstein of 26 April; and on 5 May, the Danish brig Caterine. The Prussians later released Caroline. Orders to return home arrived in Beijing on 5 May, which Gazelle received when she stopped in Yantai, China, on 19 May. She then moved to Xiamen, China, before capturing the Danish schooner Chin-Chin; Bothwell was unaware that an armistice had ended the fighting in the Second Schleswig War. The ship thereafter stopped in Hong Kong in early June and then sailed on to Singapore, where she stayed from 16 July to early August. Gazelle passed through Anjer again on the way home and had reached Simon's Town, South Africa, by 14 September. Here, she received orders to sail through the West Indies to represent Prussia in the aftermath of the war. By 15 December, she had returned to European waters, anchoring in Cherbourg, France, that day. There, she underwent repairs after her lengthy voyage abroad, and she was ready to sail for home on 1 May 1865. She reached Neufahrwasser eight days later and was decommissioned there on 3 June.

=== Operations in 1866 ===
Gazelle next recommissioned on 3 April 1866, as was with the Austrian Empire appeared to be imminent; the fleet received its mobilization orders on 12 May shortly before the outbreak of the Austro-Prussian War. The Prussian fleet assembled a squadron at Kiel commanded by Konteradmiral (Rear Admiral) Eduard von Jachmann, which Gazelle joined. The ship did not see action during the war, however. During a training cruise conducted in the western Baltic Sea later that year, a man went overboard, and a young naval cadet Alfred von Tirpitz nearly drowned in his attempt to rescue the sailor.

The ship received orders on 30 September to begin making preparations for a cruise in the Mediterranean. She moved to the recently acquired naval base at Geestemünde, where further preparations were made. A class of naval cadets also arrived to fill the crew for the voyage; these were the 1864 and 1865 crew years. KK Ludwig von Henk arrived to take command of the ship in October. The ship got underway on 18 October, stopping in Plymouth and Portsmouth, Britain, on her way through the English Channel. Repairs to her engine were carried out in Portsmouth in mid-November. From there, she continued on to Cádiz, Spain, and then entered the Mediterranean. During a stop in Valletta, Malta, on 11 December she met the gunboat SMS Blitz. Gazelle visited Naples and Civitavecchia, Italy in January and February 1867, followed by a return to Malta. By 8 March, she had arrived in Smyrna in the Ottoman Empire, where she loaded relief supplies to be carried to the island of Lesbos, which had recently been struck by a major earthquake. While in Constantinople, the Ottoman capital, she collided with the British merchant steamer Mercury.

Gazelle received orders to return home in mid-April, and she had reached Geestemünde by 12 June. There, she underwent repairs for the damage incurred in the collision, which lasted until 18 August, after which she returned to Kiel six days later. From there, she was moved to Danzig on 3 September, where she was decommissioned on 23 September for a more thorough overhaul. Her troublesome engine was repaired, and her armament was partially modernized with eight of the new 15 cm (5.9 in) guns. A subsequent inquiry into the accident in Constantinople determined that the ship's executive officer, Johannes Weickhmann, was responsible for the collision and that Henk had been asleep at the time.

=== 1871–1873 cruise to the West Indies ===
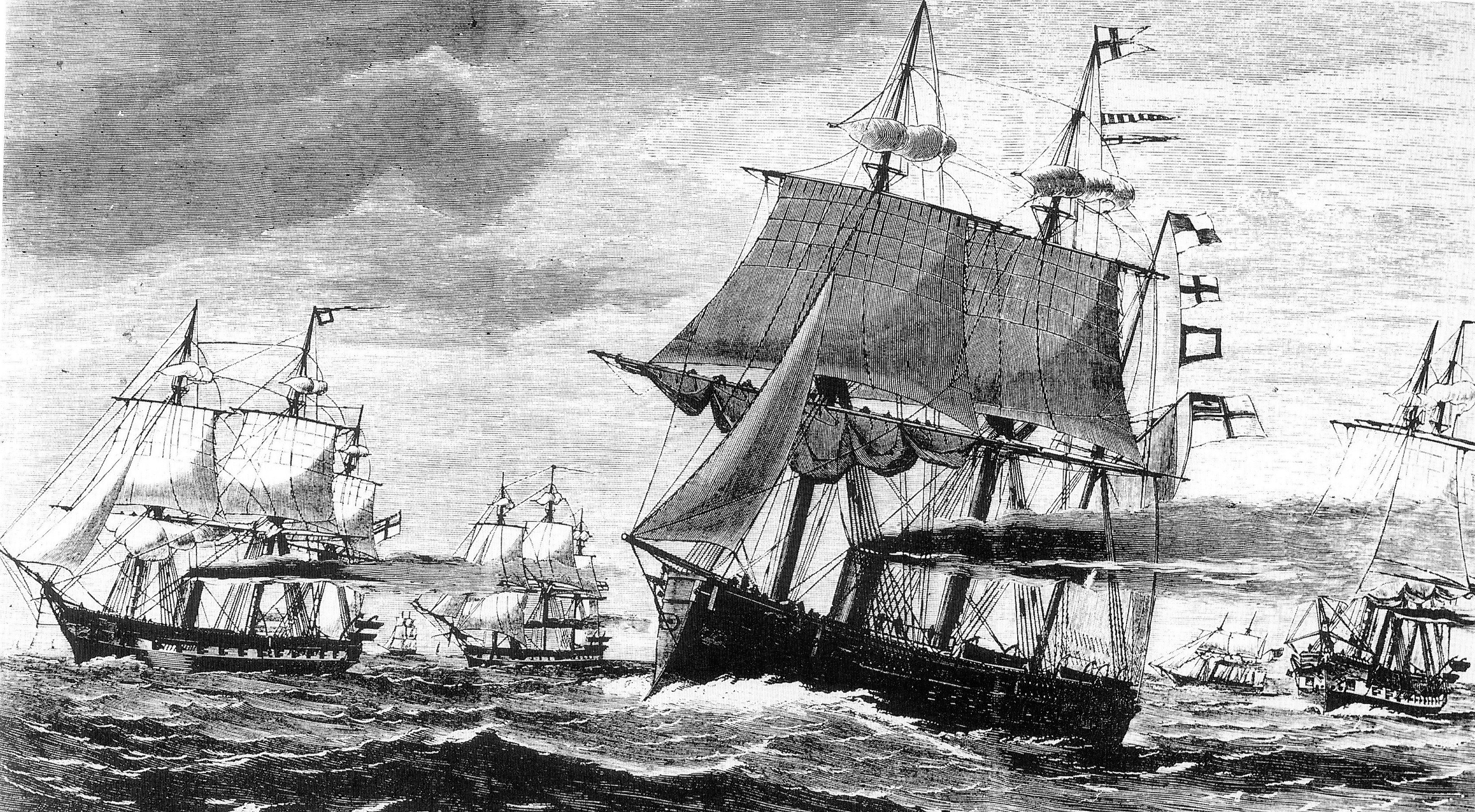
The Flying Squadron in 1872; Gazelle is second from the left

Gazelle remained out of service for the next few years. At the outbreak of the Franco-Prussian War in 1870, the Prussian Navy decided not to mobilize the Arcona-class frigates. Gazelle was stationed at Kiel for the duration of the conflict. The small Prussian navy was significantly outnumbered by the powerful French fleet, and most of the Prussian strength was concentrated in a small squadron of ironclads based at Wilhelmshaven on the North Sea. The French attempted to blockade the north German coasts, but withdrew having achieved little before the war was decided at the Battle of Sedan. With the war over by early 1871, and the various German states now unified as the German Empire, the need to protect German trading activities abroad saw the recommissioning of Gazelle on 1 July. She was ordered to patrol the West Indies, and she sailed from Germany on 23 August and arrived in Barbados on 24 October. From there, she sailed to La Guaira, Venezuela, to demand the repayment of Venezuelan debt to German companies that had been owed for several years. Gazelle was also needed to protect Germans living in the country, which was undergoing a period of civil unrest, and the local residents were growing increasingly hostile to Germans. The German chancellor, Otto von Bismarck, informed the United States government of the ship's activities to assuage concerns that Germany sought to claim a colony in the country.

The ship left Venezuela on 9 December and sailed to Santo Domingo after receiving news that the government of the Dominican Republic was considering signing an agreement that would give Germany a coaling station in the country. But the German government observed that such an agreement would be viewed by the United States as a violation of its Monroe Doctrine, and so abandoned the project. Gazelle then sailed on to Port-au-Prince, Haiti, arriving there on 19 December. There, the Germans hoped to secure payment of a debt that had been pending since 1868, but they were only able to obtain another promise of payment. She next sailed to Havana, Cuba, in early January 1872. While there in 18 March, some of her cadets were exchanged with men from the training ship SMS Niobe. Gazelle stopped in Pensacola, United States, on 1 April to embark the new German resident minister for Mexico. She then carried him to Veracruz, where a detachment of one officer and twenty men escorted him to Mexico City.

Gazelle arrived back in Havana on 19 May, where she joined her sister Vineta. The latter's commander, Kapitän zur See (KzS—Captain at Sea) Carl Ferdinand Batsch, was senior to that of Gazelle, so he took command of the two ships. They sailed back to Haiti to make another attempt to pressure the government to settle its debt to Germany. The Germans took a more forceful approach to secure payment, sending a landing party led by Leutnant (Lieutenant) Friedrich von Hollmann into the city while other sailors captured a pair of Haitian steamers. The Haitians promptly agreed to pay the debt and the ships suffered no casualties. They then cruised along the East Coast of the United States to visit a number of cities. During this cruise, Gazelle was badly damaged in a severe storm and had to stop at the Boston Navy Yard on 4 September for repairs. She thereafter rejoined Vineta, and the two ships returned to the Caribbean Sea. On 3 December, in Bridgetown, Barbados, they joined a squadron that also included the ironclad Friedrich Carl, frigate Elisabeth, and the gunboat Albatross. The unit was commanded by Kommodore Reinhold von Werner. After three months of cruises in the region, the squadron was ordered home in March 1873. On reaching Plymouth, the ships dispersed on their voyages to different German ports; Gazelle sailed on alone to Kiel, arriving on 3 May. She was then moved to Danzig, where she was decommissioned on 26 May for another extensive overhaul.

=== 1874–1876 scientific expedition ===
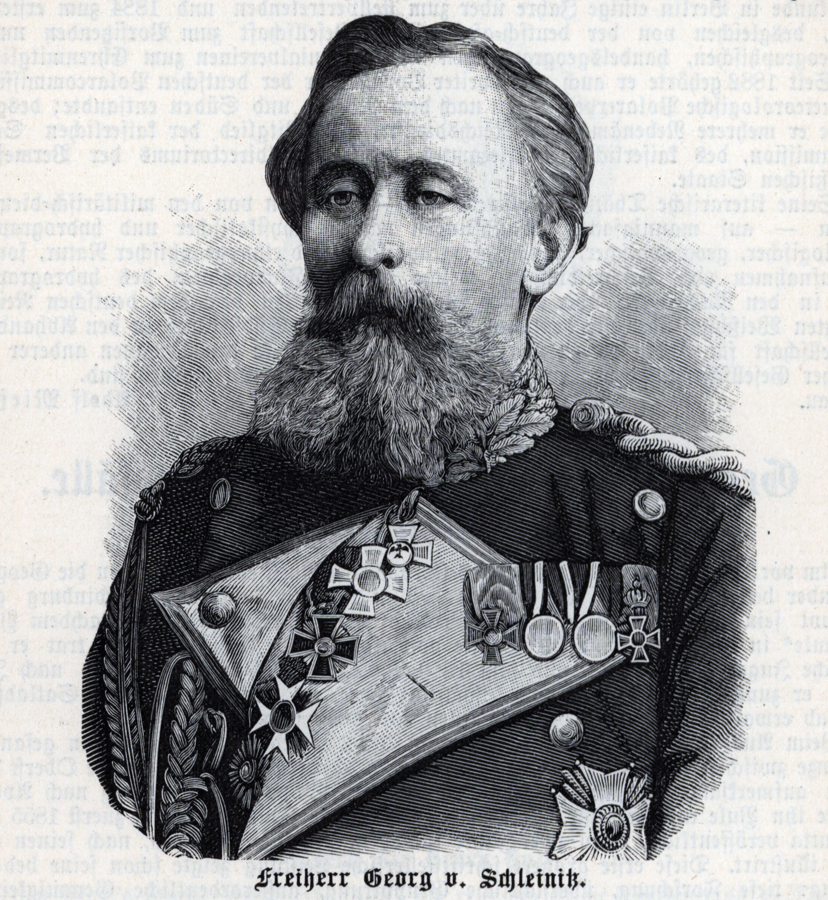
Georg von Schleinitz, who commanded Gazelle during the expedition

Gazelle was next recommissioned on 2 June 1874, under the command of KzS Georg von Schleinitz. Beginning in 1869, the Royal Saxon Society for the Sciences had requested the navy send ships to observe the next transit of Venus, which was predicted to take place in December 1874. Bismarck took an interest in the request, and he ordered four stations be set up to observe the event: Isfahan, Iran; Auckland, New Zealand; Yantai, China; and Kerguelen in the southern Indian Ocean. Gazelle was to carry the team and equipment to the last site, owing to her good sailing characteristics. The polar explorer Georg von Neumayer suggested that the mission be expanded to include a variety of other scientific endeavors, including studies on oceanography, geography, ethnography, and zoology. The navy agreed, and Gazelle was modified at Danzig for the expedition; half of her guns were removed, which meant that some fifty fewer crew was needed to man the ship. The vacated crew spaces were then converted to store various equipment needed for the studies, along with accommodations for the scientists. Researchers aboard included the zoologists Theophil Studer, Friedrich Carl Naumann, and Carl Hüesker, along with the astronomers Karl Börgen and Ladislaus Weinek, who would study the transit of Venus on 9 December 1874 at Kerguelen.

The ship moved to Kiel to complete preparations for the voyage, before departing on 21 June. The voyage would be the first major scientific cruise of the Imperial German Navy. Gazelle stopped in a number of ports along the way to her first destination, Monrovia, Liberia, which she reached on 4 August. She spent the next three days here, conducting scientific work before continuing on. She next stopped in Banana at the mouth of the Congo River in central Africa. During the ship's stay there from 2 to 8 September, the crew met the German Loango expedition led by Paul Güssfeldt. From 29 September to 4 October, Gazelle stopped in Simon's Town and Capetown in the British Cape Colony; there, the ship's instruments were calibrated to the observatory there. The ship then departed south, passing the Crozet Islands on her way to Kerguelen, which she reached on 26 October.

Gazelle anchored in Betsy Cove in Accessible Bay, a location that had been surveyed by Arcona the year before. The scientists erected a research station there, and while they conducted their work, Gazelle conducted surveys of the island, including a previously unmapped peninsula that was named for Albrecht von Roon, a former Prussian naval minister. In late December, Gazelle temporarily left the island to rendezvous with the sailing ship Gabain, which was en route to India, to transfer the results of the German observation of the transit of Venus as quickly as possible. The two ships met at sea on 3 January 1875, and the findings reached Berlin by 15 February.

Gazelle departed Kerguelen with the researchers on 5 February and sailed north through the Indian Ocean; while on the way, she surveyed the islands of Île Amsterdam and Île Saint-Paul. The ship stopped in Port Louis on the island of Mauritius on 26 February, where the researchers were disembarked to return to Germany on a merchant vessel. Gazelle got underway again on 15 March, bound for Australia, and on the way, her crew conducted a series of depth soundings along the way to chart the ocean floor. She stopped briefly in Onslow, Western Australia, before soon proceeding on to Kupang in Timor, then part of the Dutch East Indies. Gazelle stayed in Kupang from 14 to 26 May, after which she moved to Ambon Island, where the ship remained from 2 to 6 July.

Gazelle moored to a buoy, date unknown

The ship then cruised along the coast of New Guinea through the end of September, also touring the Bismarck Archipelago. The crew mapped the region and collected ethnographical materials that were to be studied Ethnological Museum of Berlin. These operations in New Guinea and the Bismarck Archipelago would later prove to be very useful for Schleinitz when he later served as the Landeshauptmann (state governor) of the colony of German New Guinea in the 1880s. During the ship's operations in the region, the crew suffered severely from malnutrition, disease, and frequent changes of climate. The men also had to resort to cutting trees to burn in the ship's boilers, as there were no available coaling stations in the area; this was difficult work that increased the strain on the sailors. The conditions aboard the ship became so bad that she stopped in Brisbane, Australia, on 29 September to rest the crew. Upon arriving, it became necessary to quarantine the vessel until 14 October due to the number of sick crewmen aboard.

On 20 October, Gazelle sailed from Brisbane, bound for Auckland, where she stayed from 29 October to 11 November. From there, she sailed north, passing through Fiji and the Tonga Islands, before arriving in Apia in Samoa on 24 December. There, the Germans hoped to negotiate an economic agreement, but the island was still in midst of internal turmoil that had been encountered there during the earlier visit of the corvette SMS Nymphe. Gazelle left Samoa shortly thereafter to return home; she sailed east to South America and entered the Strait of Magellan on 1 February 1876. While transiting the strait, she stopped in Punta Arenas, Chile, where she met her sister Vineta, which was also on a circumnavigation of the globe. During a stop in Montevideo, Uruguay, on 16 February, Gazelle met the British corvette HMS Challenger, which was then nearing the end of its own scientific expedition. The ships' crews exchanged experiences on their extended voyages around the world.

Gazelle reached Faial Island in the Azores on 10 April, and then stopped in Plymouth nine days later. She reached Kiel on 28 April, where she was decommissioned on 12 May. In the course of 23 months, the ship had sailed some 30,000 nautical miles (56,000 km; 35,000 mi) over around 450 days at sea; two-thirds of the distance was covered under sail power alone. Sixteen men from her crew died during the voyage. Schleinitz was given an honorary Doctor of Philosophy in recognition of the expedition, which was judged to have been as significant as the contemporaneous Challenger expedition. Gazelle Harbor in Empress Augusta Bay on the island of Bougainville was named after the ship, along with the Gazelle Peninsula on New Britain, which terminates at Cape Gazelle.

=== Later career ===
In late 1876, Gazelle was recommissioned to serve as a training ship for engine room and boiler room crews, replacing Arcona in this role, as the latter vessel was in need of repairs. This service lasted from 6 November to 16 December, as it had become necessary to send the ship to the Mediterranean in response to the increase in tensions between the Ottoman Empire and Russia, which would eventually erupt into the Russo-Turkish War of 1877–1878. She was briefly decommissioned on the 16th, before being recommissioned on 20 December under the command of KK Friedrich von Hacke. Gazelle got underway on 7 January 1877, and after arriving in the Mediterranean, she replaced the ironclad Friedrich Carl as the flagship of German naval forces in the region on 2 March. At the time, the other vessels in the Mediterranean included the gunboats Meteor and Comet and the aviso Pommerania. Gazelle initially visited ports in Asia Minor, the core territory of the Ottoman Empire. In early June, Meteor returned home, having been replaced by the corvette Victoria. On 14 July, now Konteradmiral Batsch arrived with the ironclad training squadron, and he took Hacke's role as commander of German naval forces in the Mediterranean. Gazelle stopped in Valletta for an overhaul that lasted from 27 August to 8 October. She thereafter resumed cruising in the eastern Mediterranean, which lasted until early April 1878. She got underway to return home on 5 April, arriving in Wilhelmshaven on 11 May. She was decommissioned there nine days later.

Gazelle was recommissioned again on 17 March 1879, once again to train crews for engine and boiler rooms; this lasted until 30 June, when she was again decommissioned. For most of this period, the ship was commanded by KzS Johann-Heinrich Pirner, though he left the ship in May. This service was repeated from 15 March to 30 June 1880, though she was also used for fisheries protection patrols during this period. Gazelle was recommissioned for the last time on 15 March 1881, though she remained part of the II Reserve; this year, she remained in commission until 6 July. She saw no further active service, and on 8 January 1884, she was struck from the naval register. From 1887 to 1906, she was used as a barracks ship for II Torpedo Division in Wilhelmshaven. She was sold for scrap in 1906 for 36,000 gold marks and broken up in the Netherlands.
