= Victor Valois =

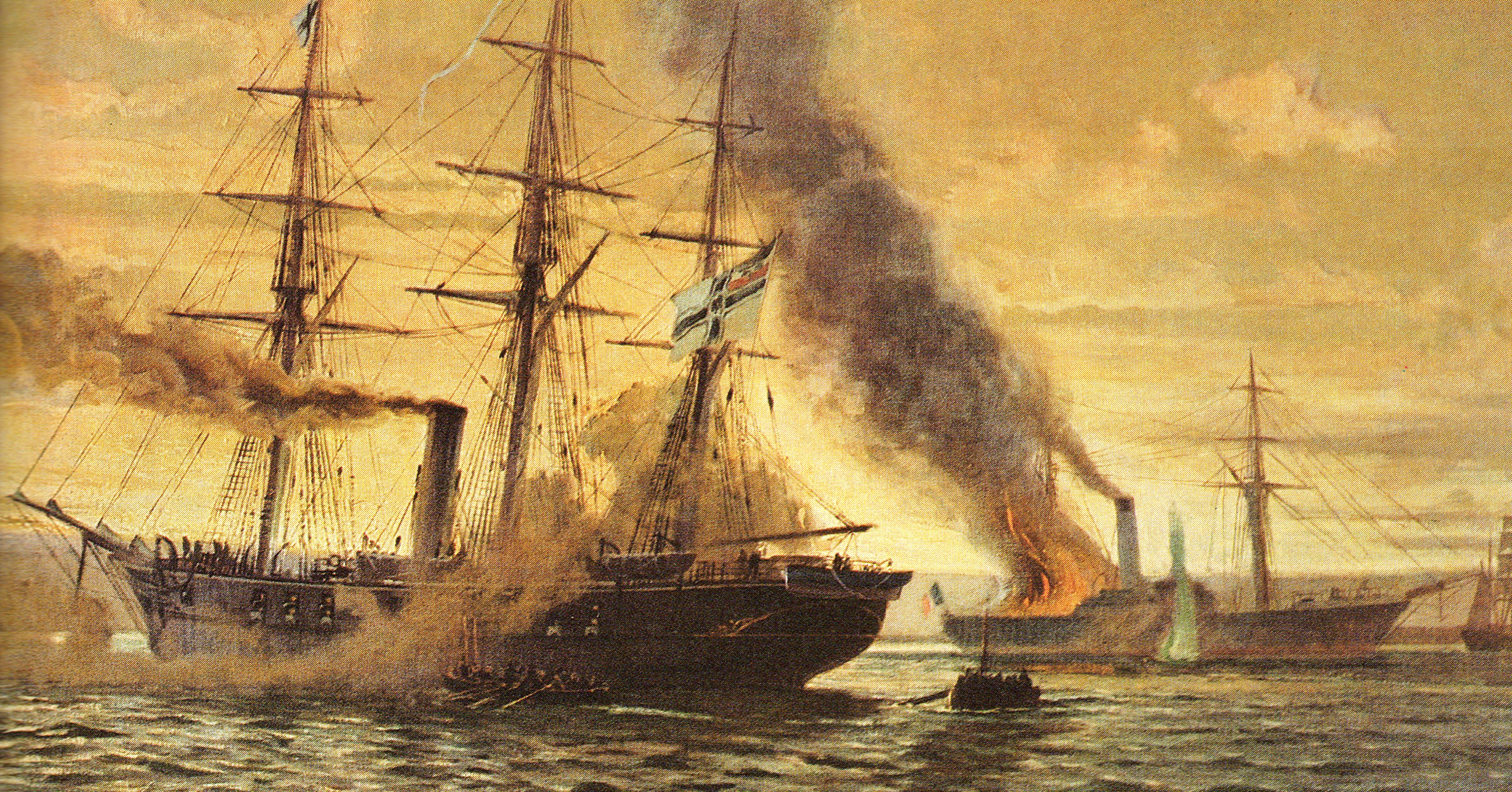
- Valois served on the SMS Augusta (left) during the Franco-Prussian War
- Born: 14 August 1841; Preußisch Holland, Kingdom of Prussia (modern-day Poland)
- Died: 4 January 1924 (aged 82) Königsberg Prussia
- Allegiance: Prussia
- Rank: Vice Admiral
- Other work: Seekraft Seegeltung Seeherrschaft, 1899.; Kreuzfahrt der S.M.S. Augusta an der Franzoeschien Kuste. 1901.; Deutschland als Seemacht, Leipzig: Wiegand, 1908.; Nieder mit England! 1914 or 1915.

Victor Valois (1841–1924), also called Anton Friedrich Victor Valois, was a vice-admiral (Vizeadmiral) in the German Imperial Navy. He graduated from the post-graduate Naval War College, the Imperial Naval Academy (Marineakademie) in 1874 in a class with three other future admirals: Otto von Diederichs, Felix von Bendemann, Gustav von Senden-Bibran.

Commissioned into the Prussian navy in 1857, Valois fought at the Battle of Jasmund in 1864. Between 1865 and 1868 he circumnavigated the world and later served in the Franco-Prussian War as captain of SMS Augusta. He sank or captured several French ships before being blockaded in Vigo until the end of the war. In 1890 he became commander of the German East Asia Squadron. Towards the end of his naval career and in retirement he was active in the debate regarding the role of the German navy. Valois supported creating a fleet of light commerce raiders, as opposed to the orthodoxy of building up a battleship force for a decisive fleet action. He wrote several influential books and pamphlets.

== Family ==
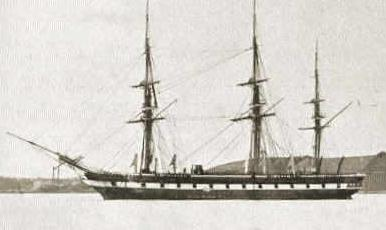
SMS Arcona

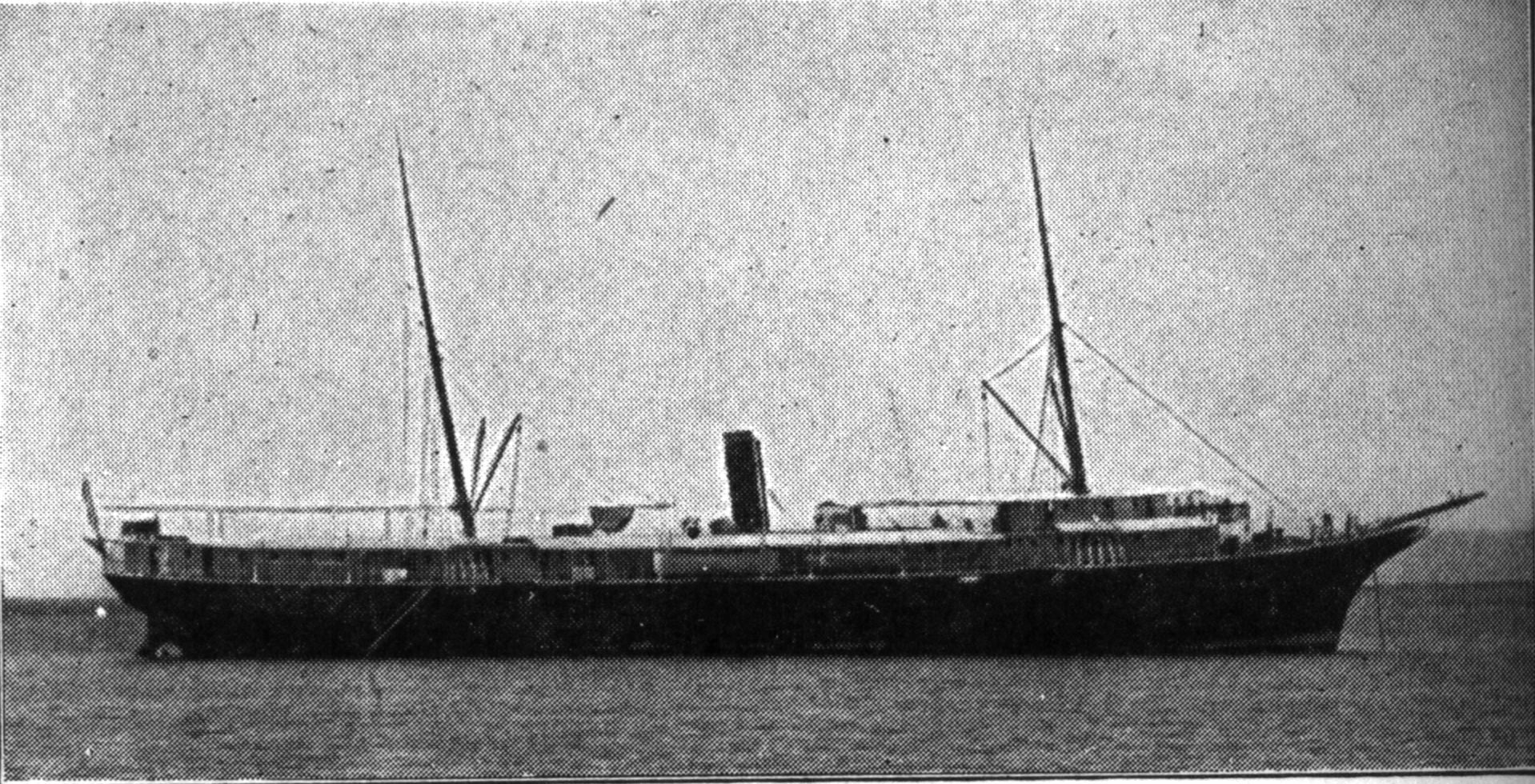
The gun-runner Itata in San Diego Bay in 1891

According to family legend, Valois' great-grandfather was lured from France to Switzerland during the Seven Years' War, where he was conscripted into Habsburg service. During the Prussian victory at Liegnitz he was among the 4,700 Austrian prisoners, and was persuaded to join the Prussian military. After the war he settled in the town of Prussian Holland, a village settled by Dutch refugees during the fourteenth century. (The town is now called Pasłęk and is part of modern-day Poland.) The son of the erstwhile prisoner became a merchant, and his son, while studying to be a justice, married the daughter of one of the deputies of the Prussian Parliament, Antonie Pohl-Senslau. Victor Valois, born in 1841 to this couple, married Minna von Behrendt. He was generally reckoned by other naval officers to be a pleasant man who spoke perfect English.

== Career ==
Valois entered the Prussian naval academy and was commissioned on 18 June 1857 and passed his naval exams that year. Afterward he joined the corvette Amazone on a training cruise around the Baltic Sea. In 1861 he joined the frigate Thetis for a three-year cruise to East Asia.

At the outbreak of the Prussian war with Denmark he was officer of the watch on the steam-powered Gunboat Loreley, under command of Captain Hans Kuhn. On 17 March 1864 he participated in the naval battle at Jasmund. At the end of the war in 1866 the Prussian navy was transferred to the North German Confederation.

From 1865 to 1868, Valois circumnavigated the world on the steam frigate Vineta, and subsequently on the steam corvette Nymphe. With the rest of the crew of Nymph, he transferred to the steam corvette Augusta, a lieutenant commander, where he was both second officer and navigation officer. After a brief supply trip to Kiel, he served as the navigator aboard Augusta around the British Isles. The ship attacked several vessels of the French government at Bordeaux, taking two as prizes, and sinking a steamship loaded with supplies for the French Army. Subsequently, Augusta took refuge in the Spanish harbour at Vigo, where it was blockaded by three French warships until 1871, when the ship returned to Kiel.

From April 1876 to September 1878, Valois commanded the gunboat Nautilus on a lengthy deployment to East Asian waters.

Valois commanded the corvette SMS Victoria (France, 1863) in February 1881 on a cruise to Liberia to protest a native attack on the shipwrecked crew of a German merchant ship. He exacted a monetary fine from the Liberian government and shelled the village of the natives involved in the attack.

In early 1890 he left the position of Director (Oberwerftdirektor) of the Imperial Shipyard in Kiel to become commander of the German East Asia Squadron. In December 1890 he was in Australia with SMS Sophie, Leipzig, Arcona and Alexandrine. The purpose of the East Asia Squadron was to protect and promote imperialist interest in Asia and the Pacific. On 21 December 1890 he was as Samoa with his squadron in connection with German plans to annex the Marshall Islands when an approaching hurricane caused him to flee in his flagship Leipzig.

This was a period of tensions and rivalries in the Pacific between the great powers, including Germany and the United States. This tension was increased slightly when Valois brought his squadron into San Francisco on 4 June 1891 without the expected courtesy of raising an American flag. Perhaps it was for this reason that Admiral Andrew E. K. Benham, commander of Mare Island Station did not visit Valois. This was during the 1891 Chilean Civil War and he was soon ordered south where, along with US and British navies, he was involved in the search for the gun-running Chilean ship Itata (Itata Incident).

== Retirement ==
The late 1890s were a period of conflict within the Imperial German navy. By this time, Alfred von Tirpitz, who favored the construction of heavy ships in direct competition with Britain, had come to power as the State Secretary of the Naval Office. In 1898, Tirpitz secured passage of the 1898 naval law, which emphasized a fleet strength that relied on battle ships and heavy cruisers.

In 1899 Valois had written a book favoring cruisers if war came with Britain. Such ships, light and fast, could attack Great Britain's merchant ships in case of war. Ships of the great tonnage, called capital ships, were expensive and time-consuming to build, and, according to Valois, would not serve the German marine well. This strategic philosophy, with its emphasis on cruisers, did not match William's (or Tirpitz's) concept of an appropriate German navy that could compete in weight, size, and impressive appearance with the vast British fleet.

== Additional work ==
His book Seekraft Seegeltung Seeherrschaft published in 1899 caused a stir of interest in international naval circles as in it he admitted that the German naval build up was directed at Britain and proposed that mutual interest of the United States and Germany should lead to an alliance against Britain.

He was considered a progressive in the naval related questions of the time, such as foreign colonies, even after his retirement. As a member of the Kolonialrat (colonial advisory board) he was the only supporter of a 1901 proposal to free all slaves in Germany's African colonies by 1920. Valois proposed that all children born to slaves should be born free, but this was overruled as "premature" and the board objected strongly to the proposal.

He was long a foe of the United Kingdom and supported a strong cruiser fleet as the most feasible way to fight her in any future war. In the April 1910 issue of Überall, the magazine of the Navy League (Flottenverein), he published a violently anti-British article, "Our Navy in the Service of the Colonial Movement". In it he wrote "there is at present no greater menace to the world's peace than the presumption of England."

Although he was long retired when the United Kingdom entered the First World War against Germany, he published a pamphlet "Nieder mit England!" (Down with England!) which strongly attacked the new enemy and called for her destruction.

== Promotions ==
- Cadet Aspirant: 21 June 1959
- Cadet 1 October 1859
- See Cadet: 10 December 1859
- Unter Leutnant zur See: 19 July 1864
- Leutnant zur See: 29 August 1866
- Kapitänleutant zur See: 25 Jan 1870
- Korvettenkapitän:
- Kapitän zur See: 17 December 1881

== Awards ==
- Prussian Red Eagle Order, 4th class, with swords
- Order of Merit: Iron Cross
- Order of the Crown, 3rd class, with swords

== Works authored ==
- Victor Valois, Seekraft Seegeltung Seeherrschaft, 1899.
- Victor Valois, Deutschland als Seemacht, Leipzig: Wiegand, 1908.
- Victor Valois, Nieder mit England! 1914 or 1915.
