= Augusta-class corvette =

Screw corvette class of the Prussian and German Imperial Navy

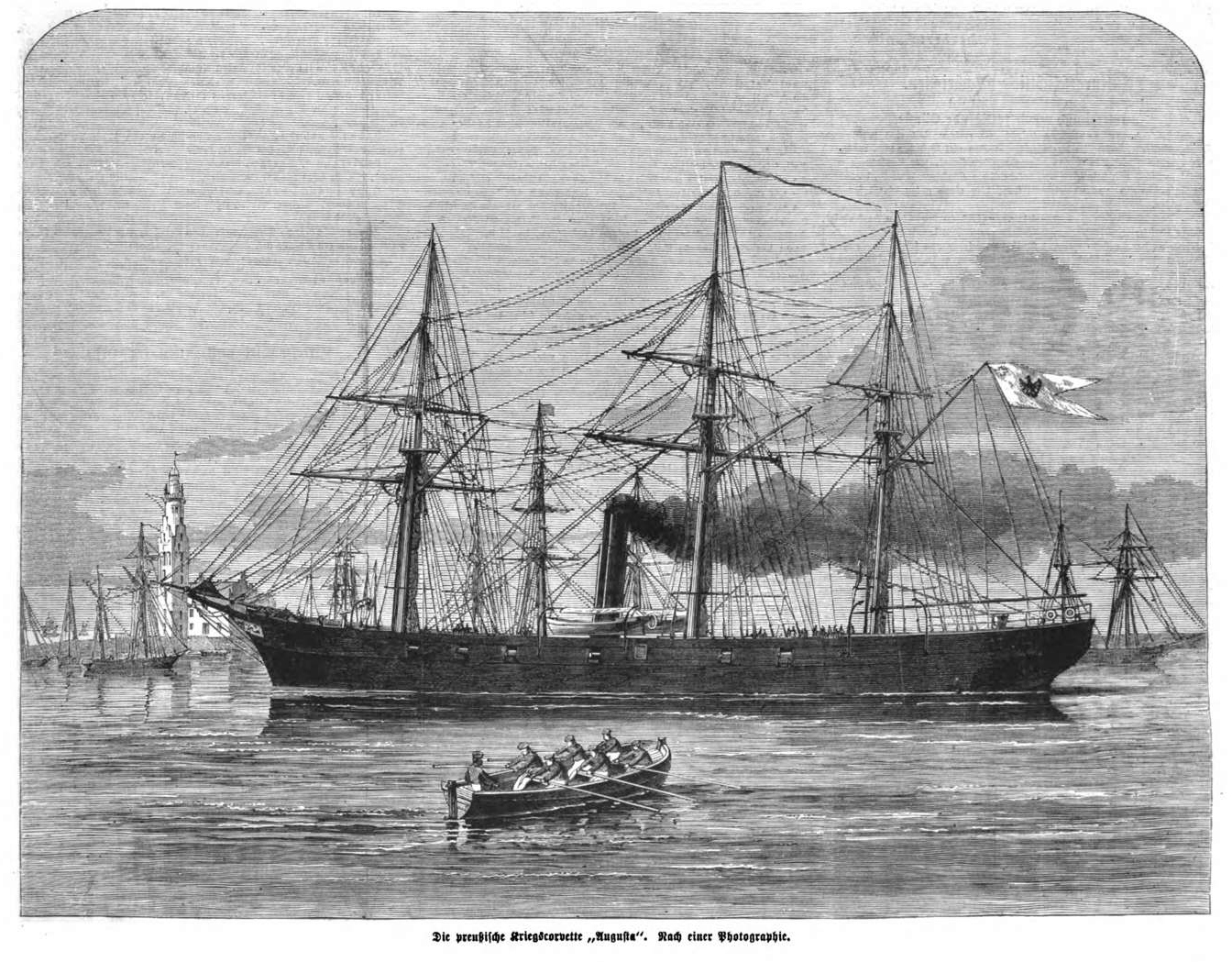
- Illustration of Augusta in 1864

Class overview
- Builders: Arman Brothers, Bordeaux
- Preceded by: Nymphe-class corvette
- Succeeded by: Ariadne-class corvette
- Built: 1863–1864
- In commission: 1864–1891
- Completed: 2
- Lost: 1
- Scrapped: 1

General characteristics
- Type: Screw corvette
- Displacement: Full load: 2,272 metric tons (2,236 long tons)
- Length: 81.5 meters (267 ft 5 in) (loa)
- Beam: 11.1 m (36 ft 5 in)
- Draft: 5.03 m (16 ft 6 in)
- Installed power: 4 × fire-tube boilers; 1,300 metric horsepower (1,300 ihp)
- Propulsion: 1 × marine steam engine; 2 × screw propellers
- Sail plan: Full ship rig
- Speed: 12 knots (22 km/h; 14 mph)
- Range: 2,500 nautical miles (4,600 km; 2,900 mi) at 12 knots (22 km/h; 14 mph)
- Crew: 15 officers; 215 sailors
- Armament: 8 × 24-pounder guns; 6 × 12-pounder guns

The Augusta class of screw corvettes were a pair of vessels acquired by the Prussian Navy in the 1860s. The class comprised two ships, Augusta and Victoria. The ships were originally secretly ordered by the Confederate States Navy in 1863 from Arman Brothers shipyard in Bordeaux, France, purportedly for the Japanese fleet. The ships, intended to be named Mississippi and Louisiana, were given the cover names Yeddo and Osaka in an attempt to hide their destination, but their delivery was blocked by the French Emperor Napoleon III in 1864. Both ships were sold to the Prussian Navy in May 1864, as the Prussians had been in search of vessels to strengthen their fleet before and during the Second Schleswig War against Denmark, though they entered service too late to see action in the conflict. The ships were intended to be used as blockade runners, but once they entered service they were too slow to be used in that capacity.

Augusta and Victoria spent most of their careers abroad. They saw no action during the Austro-Prussian War in 1866, and thereafter began a series of deployments overseas. Augusta caused a minor diplomatic incident with Costa Rica and the United States in 1868 over an attempt to secure a naval base in the Caribbean Sea, and Victoria joined her there later in the year. During the Franco-Prussian War in 1871, Augusta was used as a commerce raider and had some success off the French Atlantic coast, but Victoria did not see action during the war. Both ships went on deployments abroad in the mid and late 1870s, with destinations including the Caribbean, the Mediterranean Sea, and the Pacific Ocean.

By the early 1880s, the ships were withdrawn from front line service. Victoria was decommissioned in 1882 and slated to become a training ship, but the German navy decided that she could not adequately perform the task, so she was instead used as a fishery protection ship very intermittently through the rest of the 1880s. In 1885, Augusta was sent to carry a set of replacement crews for ships that were deployed to the South Pacific, but she sank in a cyclone in the Gulf of Aden with the loss of all aboard. Victoria continued in service until 1890; she was stricken from the naval register in 1891 and sold to ship breakers in 1892.

== Design ==
The order for what became the Augusta class came from the Confederate States Navy during the American Civil War. The French shipbuilder, Arman Brothers of Bordeaux, accepted the secret order, nominally for Japan; the design for the ships was prepared in 1863, the same year construction began on the vessels. Under the contract names of Yeddo and Osaka, the ships were intended to be named Mississippi and Louisiana in Confederate service. The ships were intended to be used as blockade runners to smuggle supplies through the Union blockade, though they proved to be slow for such a purpose in service.

Before the ships could be delivered to the Confederate Navy, the French Emperor Napoleon III intervened, however, and blocked the final delivery to the Confederate Navy, and the Prussian Navy acquired the ships instead. The Prussian government expected the Second Schleswig War against Denmark, then ongoing, to last much longer than it did, and so it started to look for warships being built in Britain and France either speculatively or for a buyer that might not be able to pay for them. When it became known that Napoleon had blocked the sale of Yeddo and Osaka, Prussia purchased the ships and the ex-Confederate ironclad warship Cheops in May 1864 to strengthen its fleet. Augusta was delivered without issue, but by the time Victoria was approaching completion, Denmark had lobbied the French government to prevent delivery of the ship, supported by Great Britain. The French government initially refused to deliver the ship, but the Prussian chancellor Otto von Bismarck was able to convince the French to allow the unarmed vessel to be transferred to the Netherlands under a French flag, from where it could be picked up by a Prussian crew and taken to Bremerhaven.

=== Characteristics ===
Augusta and Victoria were 75.2 meters (246 ft 9 in) long at the waterline and were 81.5 m (267 ft 5 in) long overall. They had a beam of 11.1 m (36 ft 5 in) and a draft of 5.03 m (16 ft 6 in) forward and 5.62 m (18 ft 5 in) aft. They displaced 1,827 metric tons (1,798 long tons) as designed and up to 2,272 t (2,236 long tons) at full load. The ships' hulls were carvel built with timber construction. The hulls were coppered to protect them from biofouling on extended cruises abroad, where regular maintenance would not be possible.

The ship's crew consisted of 15 officers and 215 enlisted men. Both vessels carried six boats, one larger and six smaller, of unrecorded type. The ships were poorly built, and they did not handle well under sail. They suffered from severe weather helm, they pitched badly, and they shipped water over the bow. They also maneuvered poorly under sail, though this improved considerably under steam power. Steering was controlled with a single rudder.

=== Machinery ===
Illustration of Augusta steaming, c. 1885

The Augusta-class ships were powered by a single horizontal, 2-cylinder marine steam engine that drove a pair of 2-bladed screw propellers that were 4.28 m (14 ft 1 in) in diameter. Steam was provided by four coal-fired fire-tube boilers that were manufactured by Mazeline of Le Havre. The boilers were ducted into a single retractable funnel amidships. As built, Augusta and Victoria were equipped with a full ship rig, but in 1871, Augusta had her main mast removed and Victoria's rig was reduced to that of a barque in 1879.

Their propulsion system was rated to give the ships a top speed of 12 knots (22 km/h; 14 mph) at 400 nominal horsepower, but on trials, both ships reached a speed of 13.5 knots (25.0 km/h; 15.5 mph) at 1,300 metric horsepower (1,300 ihp). The engines proved to be a disappointment in service, since the ships were not particularly fast, especially for vessels that had been built as blockade runners. They had a storage capacity for 340 t (330 long tons) of coal, which gave them a cruising radius of 2,500 nautical miles (4,600 km; 2,900 mi) at a speed of 12 knots (22 km/h; 14 mph).

=== Armament ===
The ships of the Augusta class were armed with a battery of eight 24-pounder guns and six 12-pounder guns, all muzzleloading guns. After 1872, these guns were replaced with four 15 cm (5.9 in) 22-caliber (cal.), six 12 cm (4.7 in) 23-cal. guns, and a single 8 cm (3.1 in) 23-cal. gun; these were more modern breechloading built-up guns. The 15 cm guns were supplied with a total of 440 shells and they had a range of 5,000 m (5,500 yd), and the 12 cm guns had 660 rounds of ammunition and a maximum range of 5,900 m (6,500 yd). Later in their careers, they had six 37 mm (1.5 in) Hotchkiss revolver cannon installed.

== Ships ==
Construction data
Ship	Original name	Builder	Laid down	Launched	Purchased
Augusta	Yeddo	Arman Brothers, Bordeaux	1863	1864	13 May 1864
Victoria	Osaka	Arman Brothers, Bordeaux	1863	1864	13 May 1864

== Service history ==
=== Augusta ===
Augusta, at some point before 1871

Augusta arrived too late to see action in the Second Schleswig War, and she operated in Prussian waters after the war. She was activated during the Austro-Prussian War of 1866, but since the Austrian Navy was occupied with the Italian fleet in the Adriatic Sea, she saw no activity during that war either. In December 1867, she embarked on the first of three major overseas cruises under what was now the North German Federal Navy, with the secret objective of securing a naval base in Central America. The ship's commander attempted to secure a lease on the port of Puerto Limón, Costa Rica in 1868, but the Costa Rican government refused and informed the United States, which viewed it as an encroachment on its sphere of influence and led to a minor diplomatic incident. Otto von Bismarck, the German chancellor, abandoned the idea in favor of maintaining good relations with the United States. During the Franco-Prussian War of 1870–1871, Augusta was used as a commerce raider against neutral vessels carrying arms and other contraband to France; she captured three vessels, two of which were taken as war prizes, with the third being sunk. She then went to coal in Vigo, Spain, and was blockaded there by a superior French naval force until the end of the war.

The ship went on two more cruises abroad, the first in 1874–1876 and the second in 1876–1878. The first cruise again went to Central American waters, but also involved a patrol off the coast of Spain to protect German interests amidst unrest in the country during the Third Carlist War. Later in the deployment, she went to Uruguay and Colombia during periods of unrest in those countries. The second cruise saw Augusta travel to the Pacific Ocean, where her captain negotiated trade agreements with the chiefs in Samoa. She also spent time in China, enforcing treaties signed with the Chinese government. In 1885, Augusta embarked on one last voyage to bring replacement crews to several German ships in Australia, but she sank in a cyclone in the Gulf of Aden while en route; no trace of the vessel or her crew of 222 was ever found. Her sinking was one of the worst peacetime disasters of the German Navy at the time.

=== Victoria ===
Victoria in port in 1880

Like her sister, Victoria arrived too late to see action in the Second Schleswig War. She spent almost her entire active career abroad, with short stints in commission in German waters. After briefly serving in home waters in the mid-1860s, the ship went on three extended overseas deployments, all to the West Indies station. The first began in 1868 and while in the Caribbean Sea, the ship protected German economic interests in Cuba and Haiti. She returned to Germany in 1869 and remained out of service through the mid-1870s. During this period, she was commissioned but not actively used in the Franco-Prussian War of 1870–1871. In 1875, she was reactivated for another deployment to the West Indies, during which she observed conflicts in Central America in the event that violence spread to Germans in the region. While touring ports in the Caribbean, she was transferred to the Mediterranean Sea in 1877 during the Russo-Turkish War, which the German government feared might result in riots against Europeans living within the Ottoman Empire. No incidents resulted that threatened German interests while she was in the area, and the ship returned to Germany in 1879.

Victoria was sent on her third deployment in 1880, again assigned to the West Indies station. She spent most of her time abroad elsewhere, however, as international incidents required her presence. In 1880, she was sent to the Mediterranean, where she forced the local Ottoman government to respond to an attack on the German explorer Friedrich Gerhard Rohlfs. Later that year, she joined an international fleet in the Adriatic Sea aimed at forcing the Ottoman Empire to comply with the terms of the 1878 Congress of Berlin. And in late 1880, she steamed to Liberia in western Africa to retaliate for an attack on a German merchant vessel that had become stranded in the country earlier in the year. Her time in the West Indies station was confined to a tour of South American ports in mid-1881, after which she returned to Liberia to force the government to comply with German demands for restitution. She returned to Germany in 1882 and was slated to become a training ship the following year, but the navy decided her crew spaces were too small, and so used another vessel instead. Victoria served intermittently as a fishery protection vessel between 1884 and 1890, before being stricken from the naval register in April 1891 and sold the following year.
