= SMS Rover =

British brig

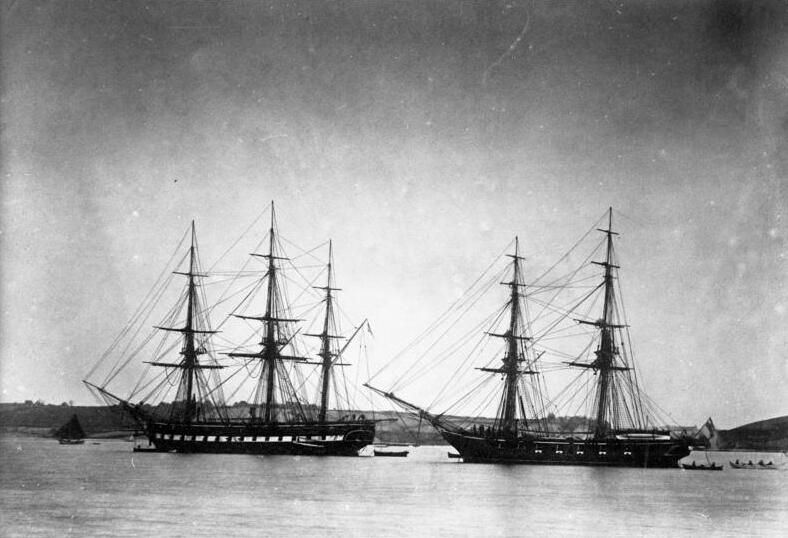

History

United Kingdom
- Name: Rover
- Builder: HM Dockyard, Pembroke
- Launched: 21 June 1853

History

(Kingdom of Prussia) Prussia German Empire
- Name: Rover
- Acquired: 9 July 1862
- In service: 15 May 1863
- Out of service: 30 September 1890
- Stricken: 18 November 1890
- Fate: Sold for scrap 1911

General characteristics
- Class & type: Helena-class sloop of war
- Displacement: 500.9 long tons (508.9 t) (normal)
- Length: 132 ft (40.2 m) (o/a)
- Beam: 337 ft 10 1/2 in (103.0 m)
- Depth of hold: 132 ft 9 in (40.5 m)
- Sail plan: brig
- Complement: 150
- Armament: Lower gundeck: guns; Upper gundeck: guns; Quarterdeck: guns; Forecastle: guns

SMS Rover was a brig built in Great Britain in 1853 by the Royal Dockyard at Pembroke in South Wales for the Royal Navy. In 1862, the Prussian Navy purchased the Rover and, retaining the old name, placed her in service in 1863 as a training ship for ship's boys. She served in this capacity in the Navy of the North German Confederation from 1867 and in the Imperial German Navy from 1872. She was decommissioned in 1890 and sold for demolition in 1911.

== Design ==
Launched in 1853 at the Pembroke Shipyard, Rover was the last of the seven 16-gun-sloop of the Helena-class. The ships of this class were rigged as brigs and were therefore also called first class brigs. The transverse-span Kraweelbuilding Rover had a Displacement of 500.9 tons, was 132 ft (40.5 m) long and had a beam of 337 ft 10½ in (10.3 m.) The Rover and her sister ship Musquito were ordered in April 1847. Construction of the Rover began in September 1850. After launching on 21 June 1853, the ship was transferred to Plymouth in July 1853. There, Musquito and Rover were put in reserve and were not armed or fully equipped.

== Service ==
=== Sale to Prussia ===
After the total losses of the schooner SMS Frauenlob and the sailing corvette SMS Amazone in 1860–61, the Prussian Diet authorized the purchase of suitable training ships abroad to quickly ensure the training needs of seamen. In 1862, they bought from the British Admiralty the sailing frigate SMS Niobe and the Helena-class sloops Musquito and Rover. While the Royal Navy, was in process of converting into a fully steam-powered navy, their wooden sailing ships could purchased cheaply. The contract of sale, dated 9 July 1862, listed £11,763 as the price for Rover.

The transfer of the purchased ships took place in October 1862 with personnel levies from the corvettes SMS Arcona and SMS Thetis returning from East Asia. With the transfer crews in place, Rover was taken over for the Prussian Navy at Plymouth-Devonport on 19 October. On 28 October, the ship began its transfer voyage to Danzig, where she arrived in late November 1862 and was decommissioned in December 1862 to be prepared for her duties as training ship in the Kaiserliche Werft.

=== Training ship ===
On 15 May 1863, Rover was commissioned as the second of three new training ships. Like the other two ships, she retained her British name. Armament was reduced to ten 24-pounders (down to only eight guns in 1867). From August 1863, Rover was part of the training squadron formed for the first time. After unit exercises, in fall the ships started a foreign voyage to the Atlantic, but were already stopped at 16 November due to tensions with Denmark. Rover served as a depot ship at Swinemünde during the German-Danish War. By the fall of 1864, the school squadron set sail from Kiel for the Atlantic with all three ships. Because of the recently ended war with Denmark, the corvettes Vineta and Victoria accompanied the departing squadron to Plymouth. There Niobe separated and continued her voyage to the West Indies, while the two escort corvettes returned to the Baltic Sea. Rover sailed into the Mediterranean via Gibraltar and Palermo to Nauplia. Poor weather conditions delayed her return at Malta, so she didn't arrive Kiel until 17 May 1865.

In the following years, Rover untertook, several short trainings in the Baltic Sea in summer and in winter a voyage to the south lasting several months. In winter 1865–66, she traveled along with Niobe to the Cape Verde Islands. From 9 October 1866 to May 1867 she sailed to the western Mediterranean. While Niobe went back to the West Indies in autumn 1867, Rover went to Lisbon, from where she undertook several shorter voyages over the winter before arriving back in Kiel on 3 May 1868.

The following two years, Rover spent the winter off Portugal and the Atlantic ports of southern Spain. On 28 April 1870, the ship arrived back in Kiel. They then sailed to Danzig and were subsequently decommissioned in July due to the Franco-Prussian War. Rover served as a residential ship for reservists, then for prisoners of war. During the war she was transferred to Kiel as a residential ship. On 15 April 1872, Rover was put back into service and was then used for the first time as a training ship for sea cadets in the eastern Baltic and the North Sea. The sister ship Musquito, which had been back in service since the previous year, and the similar newbuilding SMS Undine from kaiserliche Schiffwerft in Gdansk, which had entered service for the first time the previous year, continued to serve as training ships for cabin boys. In the summer of 1872, the navy thus had three brigs in service for the first time. On 11 October 1872, Rover was taken out of service again, since the small training ships shouldn't operate on long voyages and were only to be used during the first training period at home. In fact, Rover, which was again serving as a ship's boy training vessel, was already used in 1873 for an Atlantic voyage in autumn, calling at the West Indies and ports in the USA and Canada. The ship remained in service until autumn 1874.

In 1875, Rover was only in service for the summer half-year, and in the spring of 1876 she was merely recommissioned to be transferred to Danzig for a major overhaul. In 1877 and 1878, as well as in 1880 and 1881, Rover was in service as a ship's boy brig in the Baltic from the beginning of April to the end of October. In 1882, she saw service from the end of February to 1 May 1882 in order to brief the crew of the future experimental torpedo ship Blücher. In 1883 and 1884, she was again deployed as a ship's boy brig in the Baltic Sea during the summer half-year. Decommissioned on 15 October 1884, Rover was reactivated on 5 November 1884 to undertake a training voyage from 13 November with the crew rescued from the loss of the Undine near Skagen to the Cape Verde Islands, from which Rover returned to Kiel on 8 May 1885. She then again carried out the small voyages into the Baltic during the first section of the ship's boy training, to be decommissioned as usual on 15 October 1885. By 1889 and 1890, SMS Rover was still deployed in the Baltic during the summer months for shipboy training. On 30 September 1890, the flag of the Rover which had visited Stockholm in her last year of service, was taken down for the last time and subsequently the ship was struck from the fleet list in November.

== Fate ==
Rover, struck in November 1890, was converted into a pram and used as such in the mine depot in Friedrichsort from 1905. In 1911, the remains of the Rover were finally sold for demolition.

The figurehead of the Rover can be visited at the Bundeswehr Military History Museum in Dresden.

== Bibliography ==
- Erich Gröner, Dieter Jung, Martin Maass: Die deutschen Kriegsschiffe 1815–1945. Band 1: Panzerschiffe, Linienschiffe, Schlachtschiffe, Flugzeugträger, Kreuzer, Kanonenboote. Bernard & Graefe, München u. a. 1982, ISBN 3-7637-4800-8
- Hans H. Hildebrand/Albert Röhr/Hans-Otto Steinmetz: Die deutschen Kriegsschiffe: Biographien – ein Spiegel der Marinegeschichte von 1815 bis zur Gegenwart, Koehlers Verlagsgesellschaft, Herford,
