= SMS Augusta =

Screw corvette of the Prussian and German Imperial Navy

- Illustration of Augusta, c. 1885

History

Prussia
- Name: Augusta
- Namesake: Augusta of Saxe-Weimar-Eisenach
- Builder: Arman Brothers, Bordeaux
- Laid down: 1863
- Launched: 1864
- Acquired: 13 May 1864
- Fate: Sank in a storm, 2 June 1885

General characteristics
- Class & type: Augusta-class corvette
- Displacement: Full load: 2,272 metric tons (2,236 long tons)
- Length: 81.5 meters (267 ft 5 in) (loa)
- Beam: 11.1 m (36 ft 5 in)
- Draft: 5.03 m (16 ft 6 in)
- Installed power: 4 × fire-tube boilers; 1,300 metric horsepower (1,300 ihp)
- Propulsion: 1 × marine steam engine; 2 × screw propellers
- Sail plan: Full ship rig
- Speed: 13.5 knots (25.0 km/h; 15.5 mph)
- Range: 2,500 nautical miles (4,600 km; 2,900 mi) at 12 knots (22 km/h; 14 mph)
- Crew: 15 officers; 215 sailors
- Armament: 8 × 24-pounder guns; 6 × 12-pounder guns

SMS Augusta was a wooden steam corvette built in the 1860s, the lead ship of the Augusta class. She had one sister ship, Victoria; the ships were armed with a battery of fourteen guns. Augusta was laid down in 1863 at the Arman Brothers shipyard in Bordeaux, France, and was launched in early 1864. Originally ordered by the Confederate States Navy, her delivery was blocked by the French Emperor Napoleon III, and she was instead sold to the Prussian Navy in May 1864. The Prussians had been in search of vessels to strengthen their fleet before and during the Second Schleswig War against Denmark, but Augusta arrived too late to see action in the conflict.

Augusta was activated during the Austro-Prussian War of 1866, but since the Austrian Navy was occupied with the Italian fleet in the Adriatic Sea, she saw no action. In December 1867, she embarked on the first of three major overseas cruises under what was now the North German Federal Navy, with the secret objective of securing a naval base in Central America. Objections from the United States over an attempt to lease the port of Puerto Limón, Costa Rica caused a minor diplomatic incident and led the Germans to abandon the idea. During the Franco-Prussian War of 1870–1871, Augusta was used as a commerce raider against neutral vessels carrying arms and other contraband to France; she captured three vessels, two of which were taken as war prizes before being blockaded by a superior French naval force in Vigo, Spain.

The ship went on two more cruises abroad, the first in 1874–1876 and the second in 1876–1878. The first cruise again went to Central American waters, but also saw a stint off the coast of Spain to protect German interests amidst unrest in the country during the Third Carlist War. The second cruise saw Augusta travel to the Pacific Ocean, where her captain negotiated trade agreements with the chiefs in Samoa. She also spent time in China, enforcing treaties signed with the Chinese government. In 1885, Augusta embarked on one last voyage to bring replacement crews to several German ships in Australia, but she sank in a cyclone in the Gulf of Aden while en route; no trace of the vessel or her crew of 222 was ever found.

== Design ==
The two Augusta-class corvettes were originally ordered by the Confederate States Navy during the American Civil War from the French Arman Brothers shipyard, but after the French Emperor, Napoleon III intervened to block the sale, the Prussian Navy purchased the ships in 1864. The Kingdom of Prussia, in the midst of the Second Schleswig War against Denmark, initially anticipated a long war, and sought to acquire vessels that could be completed quickly to strengthen its fleet, though the war ended before the Augusta class entered service.

Augusta was 81.5 meters (267 ft 5 in) long overall, with a beam of 11.1 m (36 ft 5 in) and a draft of 5.03 m (16 ft 6 in) forward. She displaced 2,272 metric tons (2,236 long tons) at full load. The ship's crew consisted of 15 officers and 215 enlisted men. She was powered by a single marine steam engine that drove a pair of 2-bladed screw propellers, with steam provided by four coal-fired fire-tube boilers, which gave her a top speed of 13.5 knots (25.0 km/h; 15.5 mph) at 1,300 metric horsepower (1,300 ihp). She had a cruising radius of 2,500 nautical miles (4,600 km; 2,900 mi) at a speed of 12 knots (22 km/h; 14 mph). As built, Augusta was equipped with a full ship rig, but this was later reduced to a barque rig.

Augusta was armed with a battery of eight 24-pounder guns and six 12-pounder guns. After 1872, these guns were replaced with four 15 cm (5.9 in) 22-caliber (cal.), six 12 cm (4.7 in) 23-cal. guns, and a single 8 cm (3.1 in) 23-cal. gun. Later in her career, she had six 37 mm (1.5 in) Hotchkiss revolver cannon installed.

== Service history ==
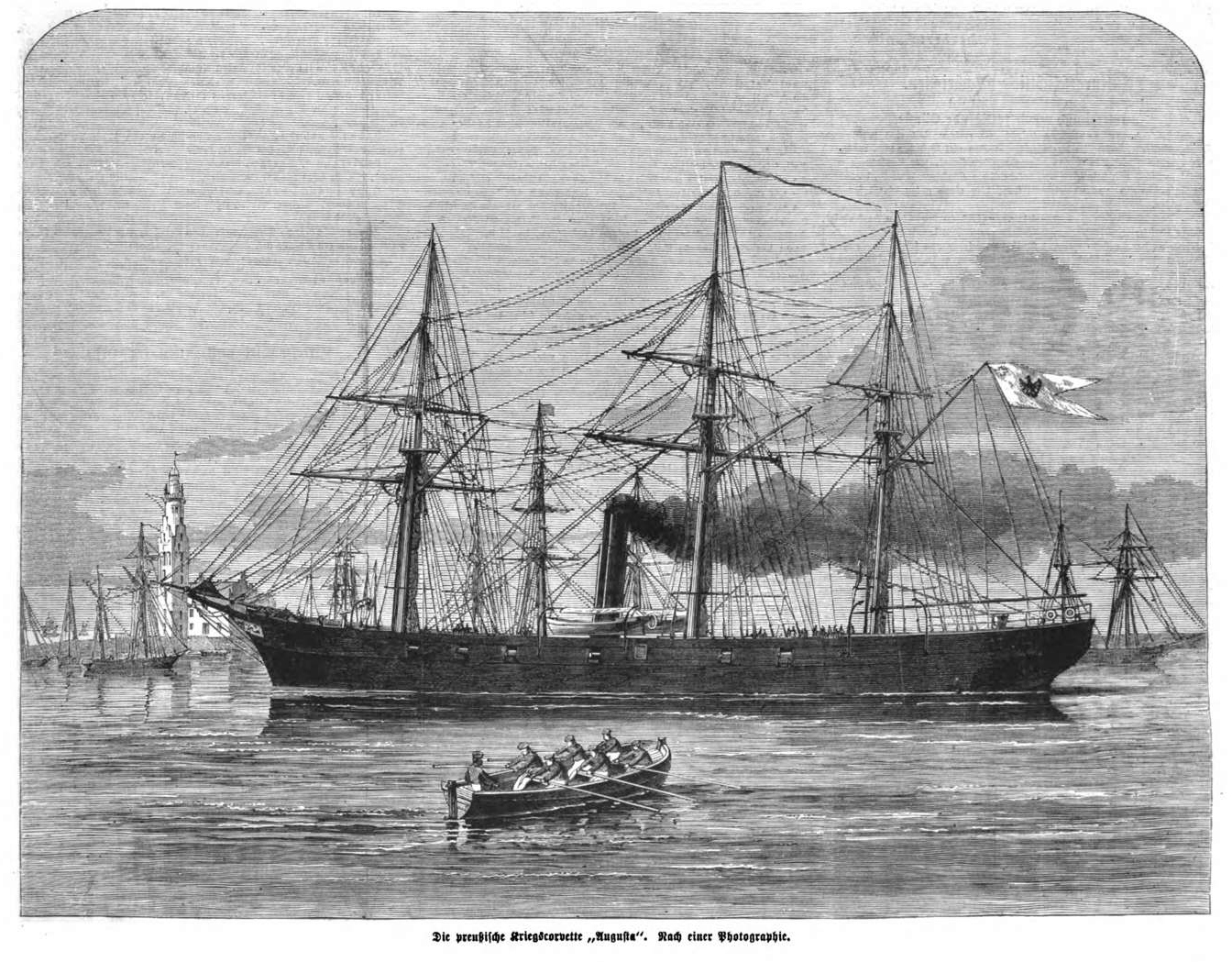
Illustration of Augusta in 1864

The keel for Augusta had been laid down at the Arman Brothers shipyard in France in mid-1863 as part of a secret order from the Confederate States Navy; the ship was originally named Yeddo, supposedly for Japan. Korvettenkapitän (KK—Corvette Captain) Ludwig von Henk inspected the ship, which was purchased on 13 May 1864. The contract was finalized on 25 May, which stipulated that the ship would be delivered complete, though without armament to Bremerhaven. Six days after the contract was signed, the ship's name was changed to Augusta in honor of King Wilhelm's wife, Augusta of Saxe-Weimar-Eisenach. After conducting brief sea trials, Augusta arrived in Bremerhaven on 20 June, where she received her battery of guns and conducted additional trials, including shooting trials, in the Jade Bight. On 20 July, Augusta joined the squadron sent by the Austrian Navy to fight the Danish fleet, though the ceasefire that ended the Second Schleswig War went into effect the following day. As a result, Augusta went to the recently acquired port of Kiel on 20 November, which had become the Prussian fleet's primary base, Konteradmiral (Rear Admiral) Eduard von Jachmann having moved the bulk of the fleet there after the end of the conflict.

Augusta spent the winter of 1864–1865 in service with a reduced crew. In early 1865, the ship received her full crew and began a series of short training cruises in the Baltic Sea, and from 20 to 24 April, was present in Sonderburg for the one-year anniversary celebrations of the Battle of Dybbøl, which the Prussians had decisively won during the Second Schleswig War. On 29 June, she returned to Sonderburg to participate in the commemoration of the crossing from Sonderburg to the island of Als. Toward the end of the year, she again had her crew reduced in Kiel over the winter of 1865–1866. She was reactivated on 1 July 1866 during the Austro-Prussian War, and was assigned to the squadron commanded by Jachmann in the North Sea. She saw no action during the war, however, as the Austrian Navy was forced to confront the Italian fleet in the Adriatic Sea and the German states that had allied with Austria possessed no significant naval forces. As a result, Augusta conducted training cruises in the Baltic and was decommissioned on 21 October in Danzig.

=== First overseas cruise ===
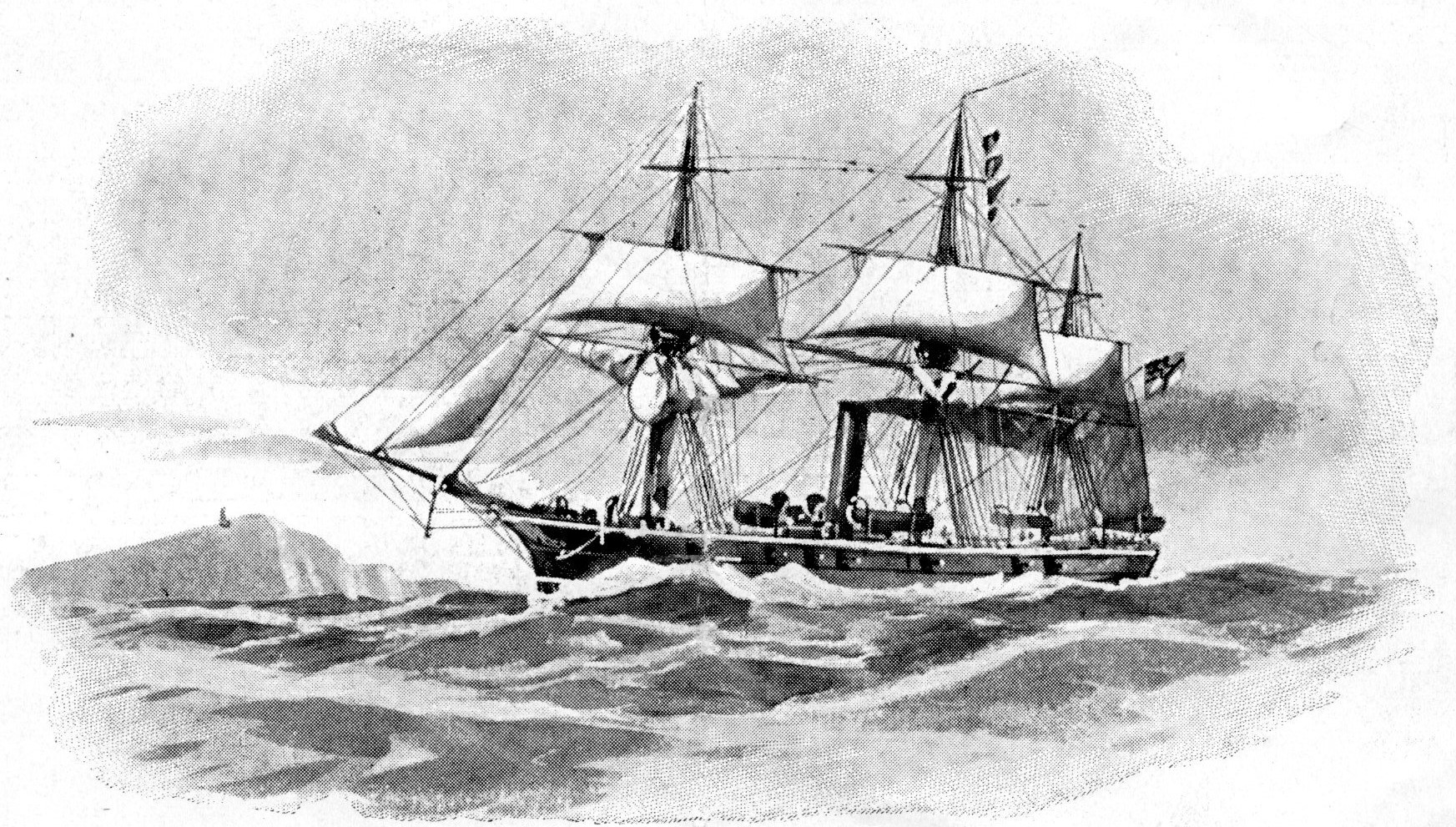
Illustration of Augusta underway

Augusta was reactivated on 23 August 1867 for an extended cruise to Central American waters. In the aftermath of the Austro-Prussian War, Prussia created the North German Confederation, and the Prussian Navy became the North German Federal Navy. To protect the expanded scale of North German maritime commerce and overseas interests, the new Federal Navy began to examine plans to acquire foreign stations where warships could be based. Initial plans called for bases in East Asia and Central America or the Caribbean, but Chancellor Otto von Bismarck was averse to provoking a conflict with the United States over its Monroe Doctrine, and so instructed the ship's captain, KK Franz Kinderling to avoid the appearance of having colonial designs on the region. Before Augusta could depart, however, repairs were necessary to reinforce the hull and patch leaks; the work was done in Bremerhaven. On 11 December, she left the port, but she had to stop in Portsmouth, Great Britain, after having been damaged in a storm in the North Sea. Repairs there lasted until February 1868, when she could resume her voyage to Central America. She stopped in Funchal, Madiera before crossing the Atlantic Ocean to Barbados and continuing on to visit the Venezuelan ports of Maracaibo and Caracas, Barranquilla, Colombia, and Colón, Panama.

The ship reached Puerto Limón, Costa Rica on 10 April, where Kinderling visited José María Castro Madriz, the President of Costa Rica; Kinderling inquired about securing a lease on Puerto Limón for use as a naval base, but Castro refused the request. The United States learned of the request and strongly criticized it, and to preserve good relations, Bismarck declared that Kinderling had exceeded his authority. Kinderling and a group of officers then departed Puerto Limón and traveled overland to the Gulf of Nicoya on the Pacific coast of the country, before returning to Augusta on 15 May, which had since moved to Colón to avoid storms. The ship visited Puerto Barrios, Guatemala, and Kinderling intended to continue the voyage north to several Mexican ports, but he was prevented from doing so. The reason for the change of plans is unknown, but the historians Hans Hildebrand, Albert Röhr, and Hans-Otto Steinmetz speculated that an outbreak of yellow fever or political pressure relating to the Puerto Limón incident may have been the cause. Already on 30 April, Augusta had received orders to return home. On the way, she stopped in New Orleans in the mouth of the Mississippi River from 2 to 5 June, before arriving in Kiel on 27 July. There, she was decommissioned on 7 September for a thorough overhaul and modernization of her armament.

=== Franco-Prussian War ===
Augusta remained out of service until the outbreak of the Franco-Prussian War in July 1870. She was initially kept in reserve, since the more powerful corvette Nymphe was more suitable for the task of harbor defense. After the defeat of the regular French armies and the formation of the French Third Republic, British and United States arms manufacturers began to ship weapons to arm the new French armies being formed, and so the German command decided to embark on a strategy of commerce raiding to interdict the arms shipments. Augusta was recommissioned for this purpose on 26 October, and owing to the lack of manpower, the crew from Nymphe had to be transferred to activate the ship. A shortage of coal delayed her sortie until 12 December. She remained in Swedish territorial waters to avoid Danish vessels that might warn France of her departure. Flying the flag of a merchant vessel, she crossed the North Sea to the Orkney Islands and proceeded to Bantry Bay, Ireland, on 21 December. While in Castletownbere the following day, she raised the North German naval ensign and began replenishing coal from a German steamer, which was completed on 25 December.

Augusta, date unknown

On the night of 25 December, Augusta left Bantry Bay in search of merchant vessels carrying weapons from the United States to France. The ship's commander, assuming that such shipments would be unloaded in Brest, began to patrol off the island of Ushant to the west of the port. The next day, Augusta stopped and inspected two neutral ships; not finding any contraband, she allowed them to proceed. Severe storms prevented the searching of any vessels for the next several days. On 2 January 1871, the ship's commander decided to move to the area off the Gironde estuary in the hopes of finding vessels carrying war materials. Two days later, she stopped the French brig St. Marc, which was carrying food intended for the French army, bound for Bordeaux. A naval cadet and five crewmen went aboard the ship, which was seized as a war prize, and taken north around Scotland back to a German port. Shortly thereafter, Augusta stopped the French barque Pierre Adolphe, which was also carrying food for the army. Another cadet and five sailors took Pierre Adolphe as a prize; with both vessels, the French crews continued to operate the vessels under the German officers' direction. Augusta then captured the French government steamship SS Mars, which was discovered to be carrying a cargo of weapons, also on 4 January. Unable to provide a prize crew for the third vessel, Augusta took off the ship's crew and then sank her.

By this time, Augusta's coal stocks were running low, and the risk of encountering French warships grew as a result of her successes in the area. She accordingly sailed to Cape Finisterre, where she inspected three neutral vessels. On 7 January, she proceeded to Vigo, Spain, to replenish her coal supply. The ship's commander inexplicably did not order coaling to begin until 12 January, which allowed French warships to arrive and blockade the harbor, the first of which was the ironclad Héroïne. Three more vessels arrived in the following days, trapping Augusta in the neutral harbor. The Armistice of Versailles was signed on 28 January, ending the fighting, and the French warships subsequently left the Spanish coast. On 7 February, Augusta also departed Vigo, and by way of a coaling stop in Mandal, Norway, arrived in Wilhelmshaven on 21 February. In the meantime, the prize Pierre Adolphe had evaded a French warship and reached the coast of Norway, but she ran aground there on 13 February. The crew was rescued by Norwegian fishermen and then picked up by St. Marc, which was then towed to Kiel by Augusta. Once the Treaty of Frankfurt was signed, officially ending the war, the French crews were repatriated aboard St. Marc.

=== Later career ===
Augusta was slated to leave for another deployment to Central America on 18 December 1871, but the voyage was cancelled and on 26 January 1872, the ship was decommissioned for another overhaul. During this period, she had her armament replaced with more modern guns. After the work finished in 1873, the naval command planned to send her to the Mediterranean Sea in November that year, but that deployment was also cancelled. She remained out of service until 1 March 1874, when she finally recommissioned for another overseas cruise, again to Central and South America. She left Wilhelmshaven on 19 March, under the command of KK Max von der Goltz. After arriving in the cruising area, Augusta began a tour of South American ports, including a stop in Montevideo, Uruguay on 5 January 1875. Unrest in Spain during the Third Carlist War prompted the naval command to send Augusta there to protect German interests. She arrived there on 29 January, and over the next three months, the situation calmed to the extent that the gunboats Nautilus and Albatross were sufficient for the task. As a result, Augusta left and, after visiting Lisbon, Portugal from 5 to 25 May, returned to Central American waters. In July, Augusta visited Haiti, though her stay was interrupted by unrest in Uruguay that necessitated her presence. In August and September, she went to Colombia for the same reason. On 25 November, her sister ship Victoria arrived to replace her on the Central American station. Augusta began the voyage back to Germany and arrived in Wilhelmshaven on 6 January 1876. There, she was decommissioned for another overhaul, which included the replacement of her boilers.

She returned to service on 20 September, and on 3 October departed for another cruise, this time to the South Pacific. She sailed around Africa, through the Indian Ocean, and then into the Pacific, arriving in the port of Apia, Samoa on 25 March 1877. The ship's commander and the German consul Weber negotiated trade agreements with the Samoan chiefs to ensure German equality with British and United States merchants. Augusta then went to Nukuʻalofa, the capital of Tonga, where an agreement that had been established previously by Eduard von Knorr was formally ratified. The ship remained there from 4 to 11 April. Augusta returned to Apia, where in December she received orders to move to the East Asia station. On 21 February 1878, she left Apia and joined the two gunboats on station on the Chinese coast, Nautilus and Cyclop. The three ships were tasked with enforcing trade agreements with the Chinese government. Augusta's stay on the station was short lived, and after her replacement, the corvette Leipzig arrived, she left Chinese waters on 5 July to return to Germany. Her route home was via the Suez Canal and the Mediterranean, rather than around Africa, and she arrived in Wilhelmshaven on 14 October. Two weeks later, she was decommissioned again. From August 1879 to December 1881, the ship was overhauled and her rigging was reduced.

An old ship by the mid-1880s, and cramped compared to newer vessels, Augusta was recommissioned on 14 April 1885 to transport replacement crews to ships on foreign stations. On 28 April, she embarked crews for the corvette Gneisenau and the gunboats Albatross and Hyäne and left Germany, bound for Australia. She passed through the Suez Canal and reached the island of Perim on 31 May, where she coaled for the next day. She departed on the night of 1/2 June, but was not heard from again. She was due in Albany, Australia on 17 June, but four weeks after she left Perim, Augusta had still not arrived which prompted an investigation into the disappearance of the ship and her 222-man crew. Merchant ships that ran the route Augusta was to have taken reported no sighting of the ship, and German warships from the East Africa station were sent to search for wreckage. No trace of the ship or her crew was found, and on 13 October, she was officially declared lost. The investigation determined that a cyclone had sunk the ship, which was not strongly enough built to weather a powerful storm, in the Gulf of Aden; the cyclone also sank the French aviso Renard, along with a British and an Ottoman steamer. The loss of Augusta was the third worst sinking in German naval history at that point, after the schooner Frauenlob in 1860 and the corvette Amazone in 1861.
