= SMS Victoria =

Screw corvette of the Prussian and German Imperial Navy

- Victoria in 1880

History

Prussia
- Name: Victoria
- Namesake: Victoria
- Builder: Arman Brothers, Bordeaux
- Laid down: 1863
- Launched: 1864
- Acquired: 13 May 1864
- Decommissioned: 14 September 1890
- Stricken: 14 April 1891
- Fate: Broken up, 1892

General characteristics
- Class & type: Augusta-class corvette
- Displacement: Full load: 2,272 metric tons (2,236 long tons)
- Length: 81.5 meters (267 ft 5 in) (loa)
- Beam: 11.1 m (36 ft 5 in)
- Draft: 5.03 m (16 ft 6 in)
- Installed power: 4 × fire-tube boilers; 1,300 metric horsepower (1,300 ihp)
- Propulsion: 1 × marine steam engine; 2 × screw propellers
- Sail plan: Full ship rig
- Speed: 13.5 knots (25.0 km/h; 15.5 mph)
- Range: 2,500 nautical miles (4,600 km; 2,900 mi) at 12 knots (22 km/h; 14 mph)
- Crew: 15 officers; 215 sailors
- Armament: 8 × 24-pounder guns; 6 × 12-pounder guns

SMS Victoria was the second and final member of the Augusta class of steam corvettes built for the Prussian Navy in the 1860s. She had one sister ship, Augusta; the ships were armed with a battery of fourteen guns. Victoria was laid down in 1863 at the Arman Brothers shipyard in Bordeaux, France, and was launched in early 1864. Originally ordered by the Confederate States Navy, her delivery was blocked by the French Emperor Napoleon III, and she was instead sold to the Prussian Navy in May 1864. The Prussians had been in search of vessels to strengthen their fleet before and during the Second Schleswig War against Denmark, but Victoria arrived too late to see action in the conflict.

Victoria spent almost her entire active career abroad. After briefly serving in home waters in the mid-1860s, the ship went on three extended overseas deployments, all to the West Indies station. The first lasted from 1868 to 1869, and saw the ship protect German economic interests in Cuba and Haiti. Victoria remained largely out of service in the early 1870s, seeing no action during the Franco-Prussian War of 1870–1871. In 1875, she was reactivated for another deployment to the West Indies; this voyage was interrupted by a transfer to the Mediterranean Sea in 1877 during the Russo-Turkish War, which the German government considered might result in riots against Europeans in the Ottoman Empire. The ship returned to Germany in 1879 and began her third voyage abroad the following year.

Assigned to the West Indies station for a third time, Victoria spent most of her time abroad elsewhere, taking part in an international naval demonstration in the Adriatic Sea in late 1880 and retaliating for an attack on a German merchant vessel in Liberia in 1881. Her time in the West Indies station was confined to a tour of South American ports in mid-1881. She returned to Germany in 1882 and was slated to become a training ship the following year, but the navy decided her crew spaces were too small, and so used another vessel instead. Victoria served intermittently as a fishery protection vessel between 1884 and 1890, before being stricken from the naval register in April 1891 and sold the following year.

== Design ==
The two Augusta-class corvettes were originally ordered by the Confederate States Navy during the American Civil War from the French Arman Brothers shipyard, but after the French Emperor, Napoleon III intervened to block the sale, the Prussian Navy purchased the ships in 1864. The Kingdom of Prussia, in the midst of the Second Schleswig War against Denmark, initially anticipated a long war, and sought to acquire vessels that could be completed quickly to strengthen its fleet, though the war ended before the Augusta class entered service.

Victoria was 81.5 meters (267 ft 5 in) long overall, with a beam of 11.1 m (36 ft 5 in) and a draft of 5.03 m (16 ft 6 in) forward. She displaced 2,272 metric tons (2,236 long tons) at full load. The ship's crew consisted of 15 officers and 215 enlisted men. She was powered by a single marine steam engine that drove a pair of 2-bladed screw propellers, with steam provided by four coal-fired fire-tube boilers, which gave her a top speed of 13.5 knots (25.0 km/h; 15.5 mph) at 1,300 metric horsepower (1,300 ihp). She had a cruising radius of 2,500 nautical miles (4,600 km; 2,900 mi) at a speed of 12 knots (22 km/h; 14 mph). As built, Victoria was equipped with a full ship rig, but this was later reduced to a barque rig.

Victoria was armed with a battery of eight 24-pounder guns and six 12-pounder guns, all of which were smoothbore guns; they were replaced with rifled guns of the same caliber in 1867. In 1871, her armament was replaced with four 15 cm (5.9 in) 22-caliber (cal.), six 12 cm (4.7 in) 23-cal. guns, and a single 8 cm (3.1 in) 23-cal. gun. Later in her career, she had six 37 mm (1.5 in) Hotchkiss revolver cannon installed.

== Service history ==
=== Construction and early career ===
The keel for Augusta had been laid down at the Arman Brothers shipyard in France in mid-1863 as part of a secret order from the Confederate States Navy; the ship was originally named Osaka, supposedly for Japan. After the Prussian government purchased the vessel, which was complete except for her armament, it sought to have the vessel, which had been renamed Victoria after the Prussian Crown Princess Victoria on 31 May, transferred to Bremerhaven, where she could be fitted with guns and placed into service. The French government had permitted the transfer of her sister ship Augusta, but by the time Victoria was ready to sail, Denmark had lobbied France to refuse to deliver a warship to an active belligerent in the Second Schleswig War. Denmark was supported in the effort by Great Britain, but the Prussian chancellor Otto von Bismarck was able to convince the French to allow the unarmed vessel to be transferred to the Netherlands under a French flag, from where it could be picked up by a Prussian crew and taken to Bremerhaven.

Victoria arrived there on 3 September, where her guns were installed and she was formally commissioned into the Prussian fleet on 14 September. She then began sea trials and shooting drills in the Jade Bight. Kiel became the Prussian fleet's primary base, Konteradmiral (Rear Admiral) Eduard von Jachmann having moved the bulk of the fleet there after the end of the conflict. On 1 October, she passed Skagen and steamed into the Baltic Sea, the war with Denmark all but over by that point, and three days later she anchored in the newly-acquired naval base at Kiel. Victoria joined the steam frigate Vineta on 2 November for a visit to Plymouth, Great Britain. On the way, they were joined by the training ships Niobe, Rover, and Musquito. The latter three vessels were sail-powered only, so the ships could not cross the North Sea until 5 November due to calm winds. Victoria was delayed by bad weather and reached Plymouth on 28 November; on the way back home she stopped in Brest, France and reached Kiel on 22 December. There, she embarked the crew for the new ironclad turret ship Arminius, which had recently been completed in Britain. Victoria escorted Arminius on the trip back to Kiel, where they arrived on 15 May 1865.

On 20 May, she left Kiel bound for Danzig, but she ran aground on the island of Fehmarn and after being pulled free had to return to Kiel. From 26 May to 1 June, she escorted the vessel carrying the remains of the Russian Crown Prince Nicholas, who had died on a tour of southern Europe. Victoria had her crew reduced in Kiel in July and was decommissioned there on 16 September. As the threat of war with Austria rose later in the year, Victoria was recommissioned on 1 January 1866 and assigned to the Baltic Sea Squadron. While towing the steam frigate Arcona, the hawser Victoria was using to pull the ship broke and got caught in her propeller, which had to be cleared in the shipyard. Victoria and Augusta later conducted shooting drills off Sonderburg, and on 31 October, the ship was decommissioned, having seen no action during the Austro-Prussian War. In 1867, Victoria went into the shipyard in Kiel to have her original smoothbore guns replaced with rifled guns of the same caliber.

=== First overseas deployment ===
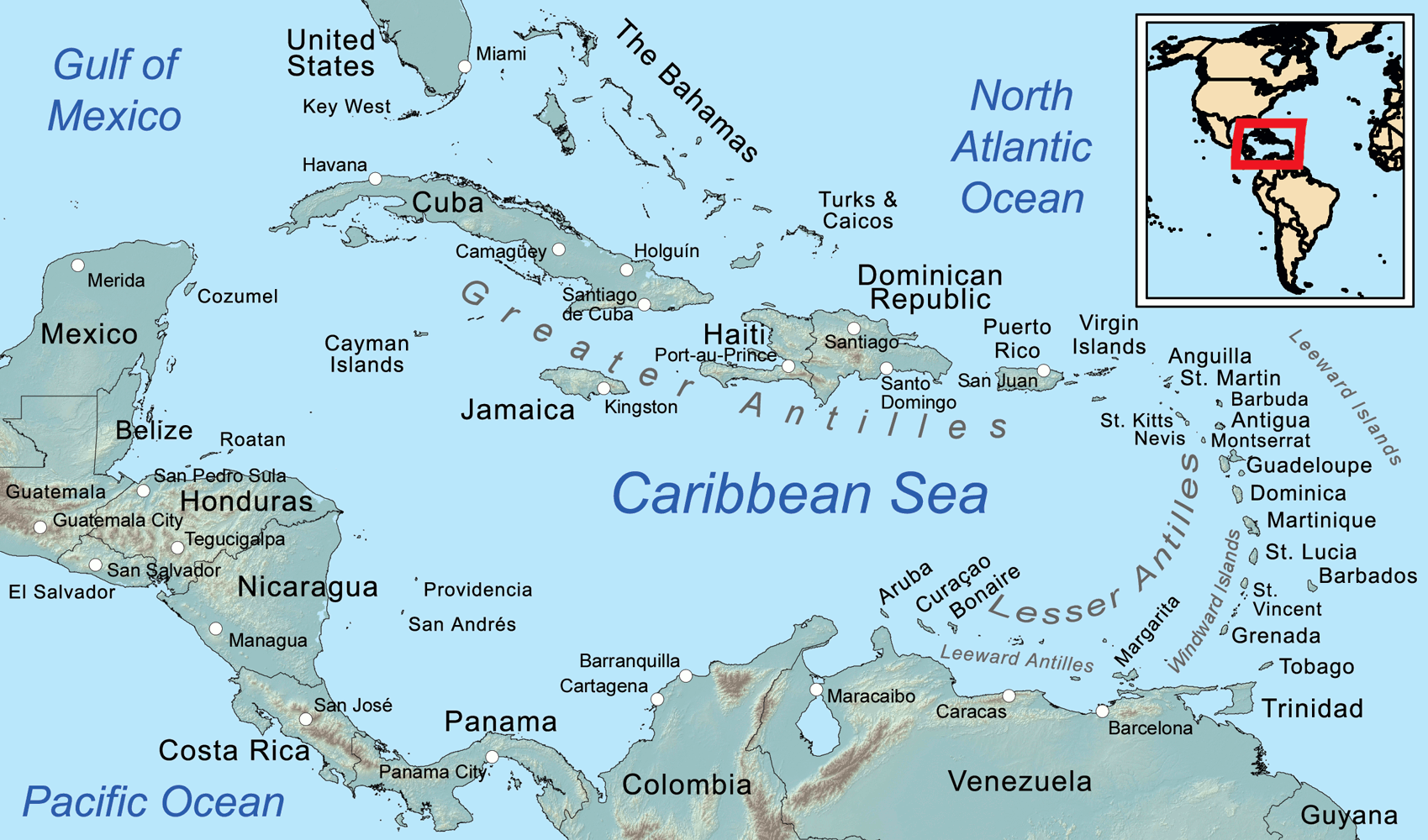
Map of the Caribbean region

She was recommissioned on 7 September 1868 for a deployment to the West Indies. She left Kiel on 29 September, but her voyage out was delayed by storm damage incurred in the North Sea, which forced her to go to Portsmouth for repairs that lasted from 15 to 27 October. She arrived in Saint-Pierre, Martinique on 26 November, and on 12 December she stopped in Havana, Cuba after unrest in the country threatened to block a shipment of tobacco that had been bought by a German firm. Victoria's arrival deterred those blocking the shipment, and she thereafter went to Port-au-Prince, Haiti, where European property had been confiscated by the government. She was successful in forcing the Haitian government to relinquish the seized property. On 9 January 1869, Victoria carried the business representative for what was now the North German Confederation from Havana to La Guaira, Venezuela. The Venezuelan government was at that time attempting to force foreign businesses to pay fees that would fund the Venezuelan military, and Victoria remained in Venezuelan waters to deter the practice. Renewed unrest in Cuba during the Ten Years' War forced the ship to return to Havana from 25 March to 22 April to protect German nationals in the area.

Outbreaks of yellow fever and cholera strained the crew, and by this time, the ship's hull was in need of maintenance. The ship's captain requested permission to take the vessel to a shipyard in St. Pierre or Rio de Janeiro, Brazil, but in the absence of an answer he took the ship to visit Colombia and various ports in the Caribbean Sea. While in Veracruz, Mexico in June, the ship received false rumors that a war had broken out between France and the North German Confederation. She therefore steamed to Havana to seek confirmation of the political situation; there, the crew learned that the countries were not at war, and they also received orders to return home on 25 July. On the way back, Victoria stopped in Norfolk in the United States, Fayal in the Azores, and Plymouth. In the last port, crewmen who had been seriously injured in a severe storm had to be sent ashore to a military hospital, and the ship itself required repairs. She arrived in Danzig on 8 October, where she was decommissioned on the 19th of the month.

=== Second overseas deployment ===
Victoria initially remained in reserve after the outbreak of the Franco-Prussian War in July 1870, but in January 1871 she was commissioned to attack French shipments of war material as a commerce raider, though she did not actually serve in that capacity. Instead, she remained in Danzig until November when she moved to Kiel. On 5 December she was decommissioned and sent into the shipyard, where she was equipped with more modern 15 cm (5.9 in) and 12 cm (4.7 in) built-up guns in place of the rifled guns she had received in 1867. She remained out of service until December 1874, when she was moved to Wilhelmshaven, though she thereafter remained in reserve. The ship conducted firing trials with the new guns from 20 March to 8 April 1875, although she was not formally commissioned for the tests. On 11 October, the ship was recommissioned for another tour in the West Indies, and she left Wilhelmshaven on 26 October. She reached Saint Thomas in the Danish West Indies on 29 November, where she relieved her sister Augusta. Victoria then proceeded with a tour of ports in the Caribbean, though unrest in Haiti necessitated her presence in May 1876. Beginning in late June, she steamed further south, visiting ports in South America, as far south as Montevideo, Uruguay. By 14 December, she had returned to Saint Thomas, thereafter resuming a cruise in the Caribbean.

The ship cruised in Venezuelan waters from 14 February to 3 March 1877. A conflict between Guatemala and El Salvador then broke out, and at the same time, Mexico was in the midst of the Revolution of Tuxtepec, and so Victoria stayed in Sabanilla, Colombia, from 8 to 14 March and then in Havana from 21 March to 3 April in the event that her intervention in either conflict became necessary. The crises passed without threatening German interests, and so Victoria left Havana on 3 April for Saint Thomas, where she received orders to cross the Atlantic to the Mediterranean Sea. She arrived in the area on 16 April and continued on to Port Said, Egypt, which she reached on 14 June. At the time, the Ottoman Empire was fighting the Russo-Turkish War, and the German government feared that anti-European riots might break out in the Levant, threatening German holdings in Jerusalem. Victoria joined the frigate Gazelle and they visited several ports in the region. Victoria was quickly recalled on 2 July, since a number of her crew had contracted an illness. The ship arrived in Wilhelmshaven on 29 July, and on 10 August she was decommissioned for a thorough overhaul, during which her rigging was reduced. She conducted sea trials from 12 to 13 August 1879 and was again decommissioned on 6 September.

=== Third overseas deployment and fate ===
On 1 July 1880, Victoria was recommissioned for another tour in the West Indies under the command of Korvettenkapitän (Corvette Captain) Victor Valois. She sailed from Wilhelmshaven on 16 July, but while in Plymouth from 19 to 22 July, she received new orders to proceed instead to Malta and await further orders. She reached Valletta, Malta on 1 August, where she was instructed to steam to Benghazi in Barqa. Senussites had attacked the German explorer Friedrich Gerhard Rohlfs, who had been on an expedition to explore the northern Congo Basin, and so the German government ordered Victoria to protect the expedition and extract financial compensation for his losses. On 29 August, Victoria left Benghazi, having secured Ottoman agreements to protect Rohlfs' team and pay restitution. She returned to Valletta, where she received orders to sail to the Adriatic Sea to join an international naval demonstration to force the Ottoman government to relinquish the city of Ulcinj to Montenegro in accordance with the terms of the 1878 Congress of Berlin. Local Albanians, backed by the Ottoman government, held the city and refused to surrender it. Around twenty vessels from Britain, France, Italy, Austria-Hungary, and Russia took part in the blockade of Ulcinj and other coastal towns, under the command of British Vice Admiral Beauchamp Seymour. The blockade began on 20 September, and by 27 November, the Ottomans caved to the demands of the Great Powers and sent in troops to force the Albanians to relinquish the city. On 3 December, the international squadron was dissolved.

Map of Liberia showing the location of Nana Kru

On the night of 5–6 December, Victoria left the Adriatic and resumed her original orders to the West Indies. She stopped in Gibraltar on 23 December for repairs on the way; there, the ship received a letter of thanks from the British governor for her participation in the international squadron, as well as orders diverting her to Liberia on 27 December. Liberians from the town of Nana Kru had attacked the German steamship SS Carlos after it had run aground. Victoria left Gibraltar on 7 February 1881 and picked up the ship's captain in Funchal, Madiera, before proceeding to Monrovia, the capital of Liberia. There, she embarked the German consul and two representatives from the Liberian government and took them to Nana Kru on 4 March. Valois sent a landing party ashore to attack the town; the men arrested nine men and took them aboard the ship, which returned to Monrovia to have the men tried for the attack. The Liberian government also agreed to pay damages for the attack. Victoria was now free to cross the Atlantic, stopping in Porto Grande Bay in Cape Verde on 17 March on the way. She visited numerous harbors in Brazil, Uruguay, and Argentina. After arriving in São Francisco do Sul, Brazil, where a sizable German expatriate community was present, the harbor pilot accidentally put the ship onto a reef, which nearly capsized the ship at low tide. Valois then conducted a survey of the port to determine what other dangerous areas were present.

While in Rio de Janeiro, Victoria received orders to return to Monrovia, because the Liberian government had failed to meet its financial obligation over the Carlos incident. She left Rio de Janeiro on 8 October and arrived in the Liberian capital on 27 October; that day, Valois threatened to bombard the city, which resulted in an immediate payment. Victoria left the port on 2 November and reached Porto Grande Bay six days later. There, she received orders to return to Germany, and she arrived in Wilhelmshaven on 21 December. She was decommissioned there on 4 January 1882 for another overhaul. Victoria was scheduled to return to service in 1883 as a training ship, but her crew spaces were deemed too small to accommodate enough trainees, and so her place was taken by the corvette Freya. Instead, she served intermittently as a fishery protection vessel, from 1 to 31 July 1884, from 27 March to 6 August 1888, and from 18 March to 14 September 1890. She was present at the official transfer ceremony for the island of Helgoland to Germany on 9 August 1890, which had been traded from Great Britain in exchange for a protectorate over the island of Zanzibar. Victoria was stricken from the naval register on 14 April 1891 and sold for scrap the next year.
