= SMS Vineta (1863) =

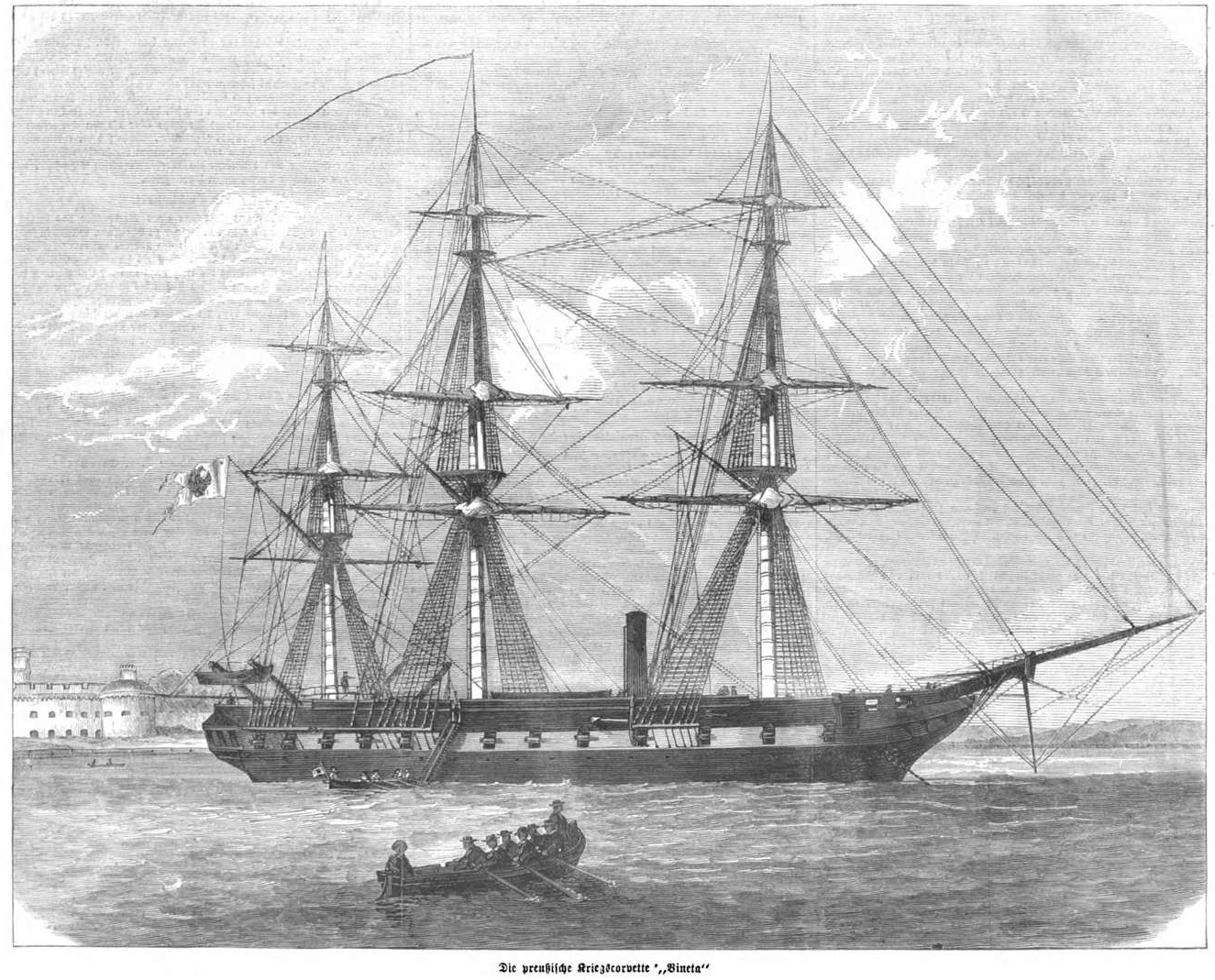
- Sketch of Vineta in 1864

History

Prussia
- Name: SMS Vineta
- Namesake: Vineta
- Builder: Königliche Werft, Danzig
- Laid down: 17 September 1860
- Launched: 4 June 1863
- Commissioned: 3 March 1864
- Decommissioned: 12 July 1884
- Stricken: 12 August 1884
- Fate: Broken up, 1897

General characteristics
- Class & type: Arcona-class frigate
- Displacement: 2,504 t (2,464 long tons)
- Length: 73.32 m (240 ft 7 in)
- Beam: 12.9 m (42 ft 4 in)
- Draft: 5.52 m (18 ft 1 in)
- Installed power: 4 × fire-tube boilers; 1,580 PS (1,560 ihp)
- Propulsion: 1 × marine steam engine; 1 × screw propeller
- Sail plan: Full-rigged ship
- Speed: 11.7 knots (21.7 km/h; 13.5 mph)
- Range: 1,350 nmi (2,500 km; 1,550 mi) at 11 knots (20 km/h; 13 mph)
- Complement: 35 officers; 345 enlisted men
- Armament: 28 × 68-pounder guns

SMS Vineta was a member of the Arcona class of steam frigates built for the Prussian Navy in the late 1850s and early 1860s. The class comprised five ships, and were the first major steam-powered warships ordered for the Prussian Navy. The ships were ordered as part of a major construction program to strengthen the nascent Prussian fleet, under the direction of Prince Adalbert, and were intended to provide defense against the Royal Danish Navy. Vineta was armed with a battery of twenty-eight guns, and was capable of steaming at a speed of 11.7 knots (21.7 km/h; 13.5 mph). Vineta was laid down in 1860, launched in 1863, and commissioned in 1864.

Completion of the ship was rushed in early 1864 in the run up to the Second Schleswig War against Denmark; the ship was still not complete at the start of the war, and so only saw brief action as a guard ship at Danzig. Vineta embarked on a major overseas voyage from 1865 to 1868, which saw the ship complete the first circumnavigation of the globe by a Prussian warship. By the time she had returned, Prussia had created the North German Confederation, a step during the unification of Germany, and as a result, Vineta passed into the North German Federal Navy. The ship was again used as a guard ship at Friedrichsort during the Franco-Prussian War of 1870–1871, but did not see action. The war resulted in the unification of the German Empire, and so Vineta now flew the third naval ensign of her career, that of the Kaiserliche Marine (Imperial Navy).

Vineta spent much of the 1870s abroad on a series of extended voyages. The first, from 1871 to 1873, took the ship to the Americas, where she intervened in a dispute between German merchants and the Haitian government. She also visited a number of ports in South and North America. The second, from 1875 to 1877, saw the ship deployed to East Asia. While there in 1876, she was part of the Anglo-German naval demonstration that resulted in the Chefoo Convention, an unequal treaty with Qing China. Her final voyage abroad began in 1879 and concluded in 1881; this time, her activities in Asian waters were less eventful. Vineta was used intermittently for training duties in the early 1880s before being struck from the naval register in 1884. Employed as a stationary training ship from 1884 to 1897, she was then broken up in Kiel.

== Design ==
In the immediate aftermath of the First Schleswig War against Denmark, Prince Adalbert began drawing up plans for the future of the Prussian Navy; he also secured the Jade Treaty that saw the port of Wilhelmshaven transferred to Prussia from the Duchy of Oldenburg, and which provided the Prussian fleet with an outlet on the North Sea. Adalbert called for a force of three screw frigates and six screw corvettes to protect Prussian maritime trade in the event of another war with Denmark. Design work was carried out between 1854 and 1855, and the first two ships were authorized in November 1855; a further pair was ordered in June 1860, and the final member of the class was ordered in February 1866.

Vineta was 73.32 meters (240 ft 7 in) long overall and had a beam of 12.9 m (42 ft 4 in) and a draft of 5.52 m (18 ft 1 in) forward. She displaced 2,113 metric tons (2,080 long tons) as designed and 2,504 t (2,464 long tons) at full load. The ship had short forecastle and sterncastle decks. Her superstructure consisted primarily of a small deckhouse aft. She had a crew of 35 officers and 345 enlisted men.

Her propulsion system consisted of a single horizontal single-expansion steam engine driving a single screw propeller, with steam supplied by four coal-burning fire-tube boilers. Exhaust was vented through a single funnel located amidships. Vineta was rated to steam at a top speed of 8 knots (15 km/h; 9.2 mph), but she significantly exceeded this speed, reaching 11.7 knots (21.7 km/h; 13.5 mph) from 1,580 metric horsepower (1,560 ihp). The ship had a cruising radius of about 1,350 nautical miles (2,500 km; 1,550 mi) at a speed of 11 knots (20 km/h; 13 mph). To supplement the steam engine on long voyages abroad, she carried a full-ship rig with a total surface area of 2,200 m^{2} (24,000 sq ft). The screw could be retracted while cruising under sail.

Vineta was armed with a battery of twenty-eight 68-pounder guns. By 1869, she had been rearmed with a battery of seventeen 15 cm (5.9 in) RK L/22 guns and two 12.5 cm (4.9 in) K L/23 guns.

== Service history ==
=== Construction and the Second Schleswig War ===
The new ship was authorized on 28 June 1860, though Adalbert initially opposed building another Arcona-class frigate, owing to the poor results initially seen with Arcona when she entered service the year before. The chief constructor, Carl Elbertzhagen, convinced Adalbert that the new ship would achieve the desired speed through alterations to the hull shape, as well as more powerful engines. Adalbert agreed to proceed with construction, and the keel for Vineta was laid down at the Königliche Werft (Royal Dockyard) in Danzig on 17 September that year. Work on the ship proceeded slowly, primarily due to a shortage of wood timbers for her hull and other fittings. The large oak timbers for her hull only began to be delivered in April 1861. She was eventually launched on 4 June 1863, and Crown Prince Friedrich and his wife Victoria attended the ceremony, during which Victoria christened the ship after the eponymous legendary Germanic city. After the start of the Second Schleswig War in early 1864, Vineta was provisionally commissioned on 3 March for limited wartime service. Her first commander was Korvettenkapitän (KK—Corvette Captain) Heinrich Köhler. She was moored in the roadstead at Neufahrwasser as a guardship. Soon thereafter, the Danish frigate Jylland appeared off the coast, but she did not engage Vineta. The latter vessel embarked on a short sea trial and shooting practice on 7 and 8 April.

Denmark announced the blockade of Danzig and Pillau on 19 April, and eleven days later, the ship of the line Skjold and several other warships appeared off Neufahrwasser. Vineta and Skjold engaged in a short and ineffective exchange of fire, but neither side was willing to engage more closely. The Danes refused to be drawn into range of the Prussian coastal artillery batteries, and the Prussians were unwilling to be lured out to confront the overwhelmingly superior Danish squadron. This inconclusive artillery duel was later repeated with the Danish ironclad warship Dannebrog. Köhler was criticized for his passive conduct in the engagement, but his ship was still incomplete and the crew was essentially untrained. Vineta nevertheless contributed to the defenses that prevented the Danes from mounting a close blockade of the port. On 12 May, the two sides agreed to an armistice to negotiate an end to the war, and at that time, Vineta sailed to Swinemünde. There, she participated in a fleet review conducted for the king, and the commander of the Prussian Navy, Prince Adalbert, used Vineta as his flagship for the ceremony. The armistice broke down on 26 June and fighting resumed, but Vineta saw no further action. She and the rest of the Prussian frigate squadron cruised along the eastern coast of Schleswig and Holstein from mid-August to 18 September.

In October, the ship came under the command of Kapitän zur See (KzS—Captain at Sea) Hans Kuhn, by which time the war had ended. On 29 October, Vineta and the new screw corvette Victoria escorted the training ships Niobe, Rover, and Musquito on a visit to Portsmouth, United Kingdom. By 22 November, Vineta had arrived back in Kiel. The ship remained in commission over the winter, and from 20 to 22 April 1865, she participated in a commemoration of the Battle of Düppel the year before. Vineta embarked Prince Otto of Bavaria on 28 April for a short cruise. She supported the transfer of the headquarters of the Marinestation der Ostsee (Baltic Sea Naval Station) from Danzig to Kiel in the recently conquered Schleswig. Friedrich and Victoria embarked aboard Vineta for a cruise from Kiel to Sonderburg and back from 8 to 10 July. Two days later, the ship sailed to Danzig, took the old barracks ship Barbarossa under tow, and brought her to Kiel. Later that year, as tensions between Prussia and Austria rose over control of Schleswig and Holstein, the Prussian chancellor Otto von Bismarck threatened to arrest Friedrich VIII, one of the claimants to the duchies. Bismarck intended to send Vineta to take Friedrich VIII to Pillau, where he was to be imprisoned, but an agreement was reached to temporarily settle the issue.

=== 1865–1868 overseas cruise ===
On 28 September 1865, Vineta received orders to make preparations for a voyage to South America. War between Paraguay, Brazil, Uruguay, and Argentina—the Paraguayan War and Uruguayan War—threatened German settlers in the countries, and the United States agreed to the deployment of Vineta in response. The ship soon got underway, and by 20 January 1866, she reached Rio de Janeiro, Brazil, where she stayed for three days. She continued south to Montevideo, Uruguay, arriving on 17 February. After arriving there, the ship received orders to sail to Chile in response to the Chincha Islands War that had recently broken out between that country and Spain, and which later drew in Peru as well. Kuhn remained in the La Plata area until 18 March, however, as the situation there remained tense. Vineta arrived in Valparaíso, Chile, on 7 May, joining a British squadron that was already in the city. The situation in Chile soon calmed, and on 23 July, the ship departed to visit Callao, Peru. She arrived there on 6 August, remaining there until 2 September.

Kuhn had received orders to cross the Pacific to China; Britain had requested Prussian assistance in combating piracy in Chinese waters since January 1866, and Vineta was to join the efforts to defeat the pirates. The ship stopped in Honolulu, Hawaii, the first time a Prussian warship had stopped in the islands; from there, she passed through the Volcano Islands before arriving at Wusong district of Shanghai, China, on 10 December. Here, Kuhn made contact with the British Rear Admiral Henry Keppel. The Prussian consul in China, Guido von Rehfues, informed Kuhn that the prospects for a successful attack on the pirates were low, given that large warships such as Vineta were unable to enter the shallow coastal waters from which the pirates operated. The Prussian consul in Guangzhou, Richard von Carlowitz, confirmed Rehfues' assessment. The ship left Shanghai in April 1867, and on 30 May, Kuhn received orders to sail to visit Japan, along with Yakushima and Formosa, the latter islands to be surveyed for potential sites for a Prussian naval base The ship reached Yokohama, Japan, on 28 June. The consul Max von Brandt embarked on the ship there in early August for a trip to Hakodate, Japan. While there, Vineta conducted shooting practice and rescued 152 passengers and crew of the British mail steamer Singapore that had run aground in the area. Vineta arrived back in Yokohama on 3 September. While the ship was moored there, an intestinal disease broke out amongst the crew.

Vineta received orders to return home on 14 October; she departed Yokohama nine days later, sailing initially to Nagasaki, Japan. While under direction of a Japanese harbor pilot outside Nagasaki on 27 October, the ship struck an undersea cliff in heavy fog at a speed of 10 knots (19 km/h; 12 mph). The crew initially thought the ship was sinking, and took to the lifeboats, but after it became clear that Vineta had remained afloat, they returned aboard. The ship was hard aground on the cliff, but the men were able to shift cargo and take advantage of shifting winds to free her from the cliff. Damage was severe, to the point that Vineta nearly broke her keel. She nevertheless entered Nagasaki the next day, where temporary repairs to her hull were made. She then sailed on to Shanghai to be dry-docked for permanent repairs. On 23 March 1868, Vineta was finally ready to resume the voyage home. Before departing, the ship hoisted the flag of the recently founded North German Confederation, which had been formed after the Austro-Prussian War, which had been fought while Vineta was abroad. The return home was deferred once again, however, after Brandt requested the ship return to Japan to protect Prussian nationals during the Boshin War, which had broken out earlier that year. The ship arrived in Yokohama in late March, but already by the end of April, allowing her to depart on 7 May. She passed through Singapore, Simon's Town, and Plymouth, before arriving in Kiel on 1 October. She was decommissioned there on 24 October, and King Wilhelm I issued a cabinet order recognizing the crew's efforts. The ship had completed the first circumnavigation of the globe of the German fleet.

=== 1871–1873 training cruise ===
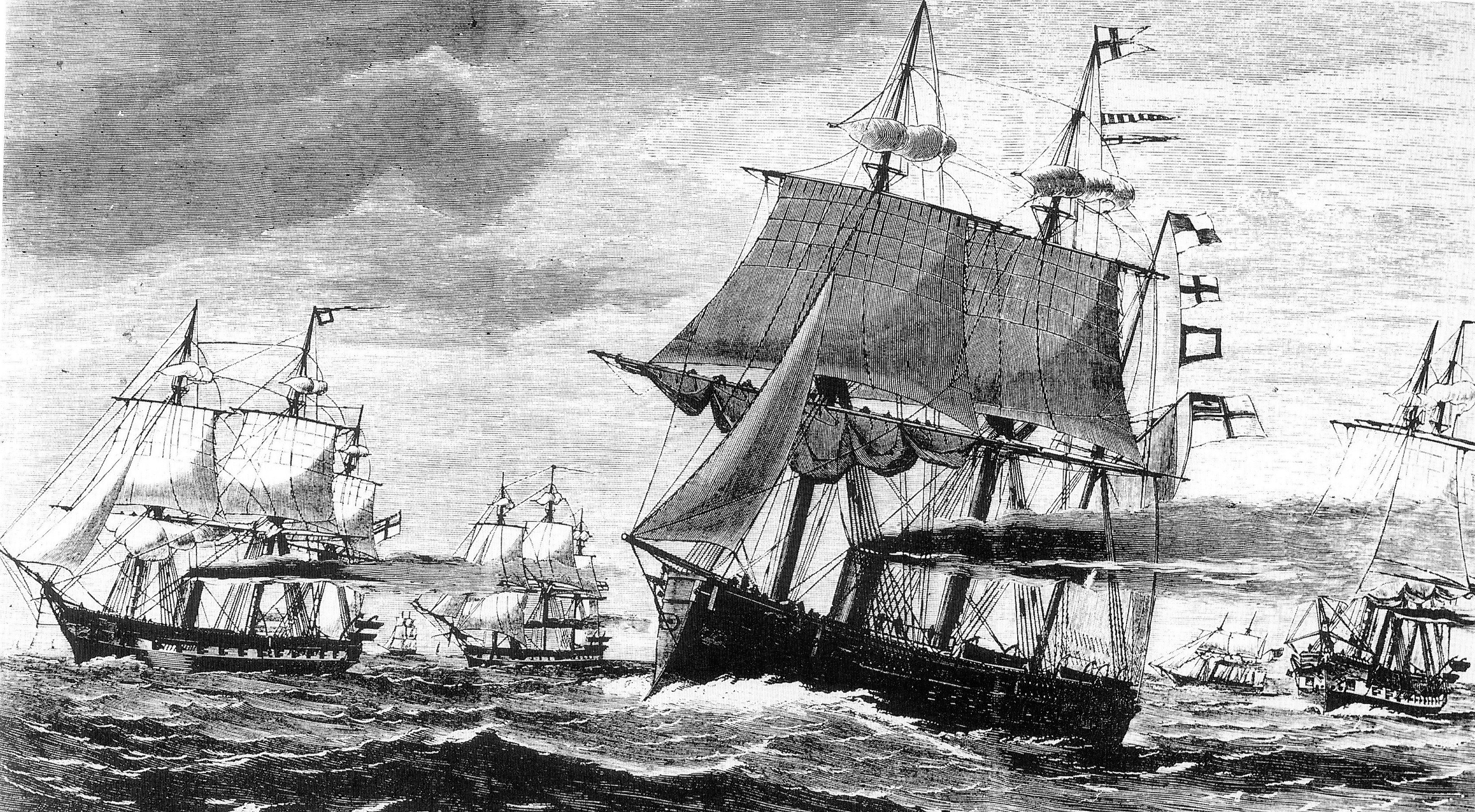
The Flying Squadron in 1872; Vineta is at left

Vineta underwent an extensive overhaul in 1869 and into 1870, and was not recommissioned during the Franco-Prussian War of 1870–1871. At the time, the navy only planned to reactivate the ship as a guard ship at Friedrichsort outside of Kiel in the event of a major French attack on the port, which did not materialize. Later during the war, she was towed to Swinemünde. After the war ended in early 1871, which resulted in the unified German Empire, Vineta was assigned to further overseas training cruises. She was recommissioned on 1 April, under the command of KzS Carl Ferdinand Batsch and as a vessel of the Kaiserliche Marine (Imperial Navy), to serve as a training ship for naval cadets. The ship departed Germany on 16 August, bound for Central and South American waters. On the way, she stopped in Lisbon, Portugal, where King Luís I of Portugal visited the ship. Vineta passed through Fernando de Noronha before arriving in Rio de Janeiro on 4 December. She left that port six days later for Montevideo, arriving there on 19 December.

From there, Batsch took his ship north, stopping in a number of Brazilian ports on his way to the Caribbean Sea. Vineta anchored in Port-au-Prince, Haiti, on 26 March 1872. By 19 May, she had moved to Havana, Cuba, where she met her sister Gazelle, and the two ships operated together for a time. Because Batsch was the senior captain, he was given the temporary title of Kommodore to denote his overall command. The two ships sailed to Port-au-Prince on 13 June to demand repayment of a loan for a railway line that a pair of Prussians had built for the government. Previous attempts to secure payment, by Gazelle in December 1871 and their sister Arcona in 1870, were unsuccessful. After Vineta and Gazelle arrived in the harbor, Batsch issued an ultimatum to pay the debt, or coercive measures would be taken. When the government responded unsatisfactorily on the evening of 13 June, the Germans seized a pair of corvettes from the Haitian Navy, Union and Mont Organisé, and informed the government that they would not be returned until payment was made. That evening, Haitian forces attacked Vineta's pinnace, but the assault was repelled.

In a meeting that night that included other foreign representatives, the French and British encouraged the Haitians to attack Vineta and Gazelle with their coastal artillery batteries, but the United States opposed the idea, and the Haitian government agreed to a peaceful resolution. Payment was transferred to Vineta at around 02:00 on 14 June, and six hours later the Germans released the two seized ships. An hour later, both sides exchanged salutes and the Germans departed. The frigates thereafter cruised along the East Coast of the United States, stopping in Boston from 31 August to 18 September. In November, they joined the recently formed "Flying Squadron" led by the ironclad Friedrich Carl in Bridgetown, Barbados. Vineta left the Caribbean on 13 March 1873, bound for home. She arrived in Wilhelmshaven on 25 April, where she was decommissioned on 5 May.

=== 1875–1877 training cruise ===
Vineta was in need of repairs, but the shortage of active warships in the German Navy of the 1870s led to the ship being recommissioned almost immediately on 4 June, under the command of KK Wilhelm von Wickede. The ship joined the training squadron that year, which first sailed from Wilhelmshaven to Kiel. and during the voyage, they conducted combat training based on the recently deceased Adalbert's tactical planning. The squadron was then sent to Oslo for the coronation of King Oscar II of Sweden–Norway. The squadron then returned to Kiel, where Vineta was then decommissioned on 24 September.

Eventually, on 22 June 1874, Vineta was able to be dry-docked in Danzig for an extensive overhaul. The ship was temporarily recommissioned on 1 September 1875 under the command of KzS Alexander von Monts to be moved to Kiel, where she was decommissioned again on 15 September. The period out of service did not last long, however, and she was recommissioned again on 11 October, again under Monts' command. The ship was scheduled for another overseas training cruise, this time to East Asia. Vineta got underway on 19 October, sailing south through the Atlantic, rounding Cape Horn to the Pacific. While passing through Punta Arenas in the Strait of Magellan, she encountered her sister Gazelle, which was then returning from a major scientific voyage. While the ship was in Valparaíso, the Chilean president, Federico Errázuriz Zañartu, visited Vineta. The ship then continued north to Callao.

After departing the South American coast, Vineta sailed across the Pacific, eventually reaching Hong Kong on 6 June 1876. There, Monts took the title kommodore as the commander of German naval forces in the region, which also included Vineta's sister Hertha, the corvette Ariadne, and the gunboats Nautilus and Cyclop. (Note: Ariadne would be replaced by the corvette Luise on 1 July.) The ships had been assembled there to defeat Chinese pirates that had been a persistent problem in the region; they had recently attacked the German merchant vessel Anna and other Chinese had murdered a British consul in the unrelated Margary Affair. Germany was joined in the effort by several other European powers, which sent a total of thirty-five warships to pressure the Chinese government to make a stronger effort to curtail the pirates' activities. The Europeans also forced China to open more of its ports to foreign trade through an unequal treaty in the Chefoo Convention. On 28 August, Brandt and a Chinese viceroy visited Vineta. Having achieved their goals, the Germans disbanded the squadron on 31 August, which allowed Vineta to embark on a tour of Japan. After visiting several ports, she stopped in Yokohama for repairs on 12 October. While she was there, a group of eight Japanese cadets came aboard to learn about German naval training.

After departing Japan, Vineta stopped in Manila in the Philippines, where the Spanish colonial governor had imposed a blockade on the Sulu Archipelago. A German merchant ship was trapped there, and Vineta was sent to free it. After negotiations that also included a British representative secured the release of the merchant vessel, Vineta sailed on to Singapore, bound for home. There, she met her sister Elisabeth, which had recently arrived to replace her as the flagship of German forces in East Asia. While there, Monts, the captain of Elisabeth, and their staffs went ashore to meet Abu Bakar of Johor. Vineta got underway again on 14 March 1877, and by mid-May she had reached Simon's Town, where she received orders to divert to Argentina. She cruised off the Argentine coast from 3 to 31 July, during which time she stopped in Carmen de Patagones. From there, she stopped in Santos and Salvador, Brazil, before eventually arriving in Wilhelmshaven on 2 November. She was decommissioned there on 17 November.

=== Later career ===
Vineta was recommissioned for training duties for engine and boiler room crews from 16 March to 22 July 1878; during this period, she was also employed as a fishery protection vessel. A lengthy overhaul at Danzig then followed. She was recommissioned on 18 July 1879 under the command of KzS Paul Zirzow to be moved to Kiel, where she was decommissioned on 9 August. After being recommissioned on 1 October, still under Zirzow's command, she resumed training duties, this time cruising abroad once again. She departed Kiel on 14 October, bound for South American waters as in previous years. While in Valparaíso, she met another group of German warships led by the ironclad Hansa. Vineta remained there only briefly, however, and she soon departed to visit Panama, Acapulco, Mexico, and Honolulu before arriving in Yokohama on 6 June 1880. Zirzow became the commander of German forces in the region upon arrival there. Vineta struck a submerged rock off Kamakura, Japan, but was not seriously damaged. She cruised off the coast of Japan and China for the next several months, and during another stop in Yokohama in March 1881, she received orders to return home. While she stopped in Singapore, dysentery broke out among the crew, forcing her to send several seriously ill men ashore to be treated. She remained there until 22 September, but five men had to be left behind, as they had still not recovered. Vineta reached Wilhelmshaven on 25 November, to be decommissioned there on 12 December.

Vineta saw little significant service thereafter. She was operated briefly from 21 February to 14 July 1882 for training cruises in home waters, and beginning in March that year, she was commanded by KK Ernst von Reiche. She was reactivated again from 15 March to 12 July 1883 for another period of training cruises. Her last period of active service lasted from 15 March to 12 July 1884, and consisted of engine and boiler training for new recruits. The ship was struck from the naval register on 12 August, and she was thereafter used as a stationary training hulk. In 1897, she was replaced in this role by the corvette Leipzig, and Vineta was sold to ship breakers in Kiel for dismantling.
