= Cape Gazelle =

Cape located in peninsula

Coordinates: 4.324°S 152.398°E

Cape Gazelle is a cape in East New Britain province, Papua New Guinea, located in the far north-east of the Gazelle Peninsula. The cape was named by Georg Gustav Freiherr von Schleinitz after his ship SMS Gazelle.
