= SMS Niobe (1849) =

Frigate of the British and German navies

- Niobe in Kiel

History

United Kingdom
- Name: HMS Niobe
- Namesake: Niobe
- Ordered: 28 March 1846
- Builder: Devonport dockyard
- Laid down: May 1847
- Launched: 18 September 1849
- Completed: 5 October 1849
- Fate: Sold to the Prussian Navy on 9 July 1862

History

Prussia
- Name: SMS Niobe
- Acquired: 9 July 1862
- Stricken: 18 November 1890
- Fate: Broken up, 1919

General characteristics (as built)
- Class & type: Diamond-class 28-gun sixth-rate frigate
- Tons burthen: 1051 1/94 bm
- Length: 140 ft (42.7 m)
- Beam: 42 ft (12.8 m)
- Draught: 17.7 ft (5.39 m) aft
- Depth of hold: 11 ft 1 in (3.4 m)
- Sail plan: Ship rig
- Complement: 240
- Armament: Upper deck: 20 × 32-pounder (45 cwt) (Note: "Cwt" is the abbreviation for hundredweight, 45 cwt referring to the weight of the gun.); Quarterdeck: 1 × 68-pounder (56 cwt), 10 × 32-pounder (25 cwt); Forecastle: 1 × 68-pounder (56 cwt), 2 × 32-pounder (25 cwt)

SMS Niobe was a Diamond-class 28-gun sixth-rate sailing frigate built for the Royal Navy in the 1840s. She was never commissioned into the Royal Navy, which was converting to steam power, and was sold to Prussia in 1862. She was named after Niobe, a figure from Greek mythology. She served with the Prussian Navy, the North German Federal Navy and the Imperial German Navy as a training ship until stricken and hulked in 1890. Niobe was eventually broken up in 1919.

== Description ==
Niobe was a three-masted, ship-rigged frigate that had a sail area of 1,650 square metres (17,800 sq ft). Her maximum speed was 14 knots (26 km/h; 16 mph). The ship was considered to be a very good sea boat and very manoeuvrable, although she did suffer from severe pitching. Niobe was designed for a crew of 240 officers and enlisted men, but her crew numbered 34 officers and 316 enlisted men in Prussian service.

Measured at the gundeck, Niobe had a length of 140 feet (42.7 m), a beam of 42 feet (12.8 m) and a depth of hold of 11 ft 1 in (3.4 m). She was 1051 1/94 tons burthen in size and displaced 1,590 long tons (1,620 t). Forward, the ship had a draught of 16.6 ft (5.05 m) and 17.7 ft (5.39 m) aft.

In British service, Niobe was intended to be armed with twenty 32-pounder (45 cwt) smoothbore on the upper deck. The ship was also fitted with one 68-pounder (56 cwt) smoothbore shell gun and ten short 32-pounder guns on her quarterdeck and another 68-pounder and four more short 32-pounders on her forecastle. All of these 32-pounders were of the lighter 25 cwt model. The Prussians rearmed her with sixteen 68-pounder guns and four 30-pounder smoothbore guns. Niobe was later rearmed with six 22-calibre 15-centimetre (5.9 in) rifled guns. These were later replaced by six 23-calibre 12-centimetre (4.7 in) rifled guns.

== Service history ==
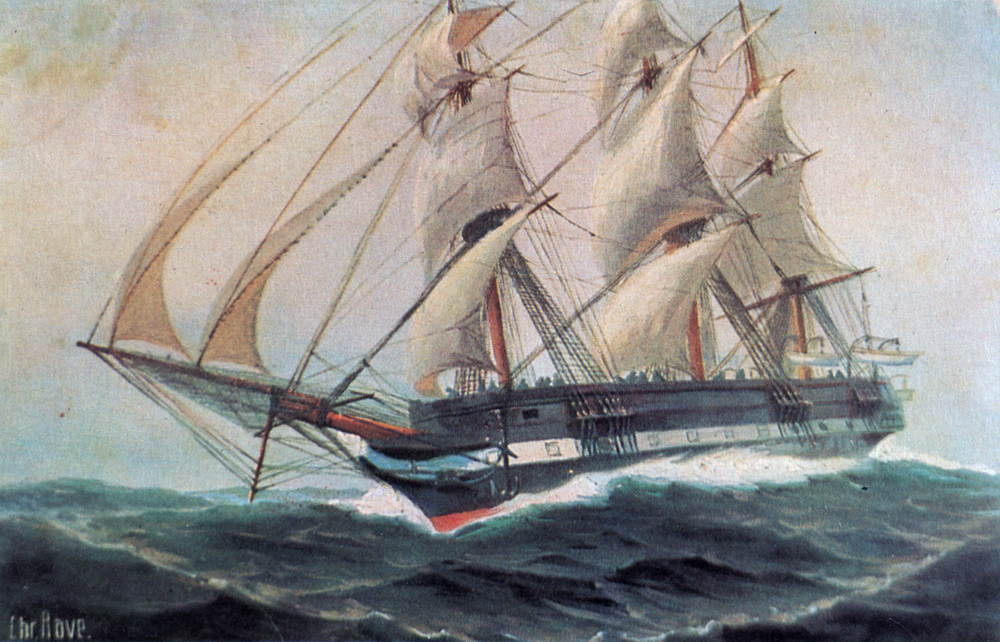
SMS Niobe

Niobe was laid down in May 1847 at the Devonport Dockyard and launched on 18 September 1849. Completed on 5 October, the ship was never commissioned in the Royal Navy. She was sold to Prussia on 9 July 1862 for the price of £15,892 and used as a training ship for naval cadets from 12 October. In 1865, Niobe was commanded by the future admiral, Carl Ferdinand Batsch and among its cadets were seven future admirals, Alfred von Tirpitz, Wilhelm Büchsel, Oscar Klausa, Iwan Oldekop, Otto von Diederichs, Richard Geissler, and Oscar Boeters. Accompanied by the brig SMS Rover, the ship visited Plymouth, Madeira, the Cape Verde Islands, Cádiz, and Lisbon from 30 September 1865 to 15 May 1866. After serving in the successive navies of the emerging German state, Niobe was stricken from the navy list on 18 November 1890 and hulked at Kiel, eventually being broken up in 1919. The ship's figurehead survives and is located at the Naval Academy at Mürwik.

== Sources ==
- Colledge, J. J.; Warlow, Ben (2006) [1969]. Ships of the Royal Navy: The Complete Record of All Fighting Ships of the Royal Navy from the 15th Century to the Present (3rd Rev ed.). London: Chatham Publishing. ISBN 978-1-86176-281-8. OCLC 67375475.
- Gröner, Erich (1990). German Warships 1815–1945. Vol. I: Major Surface Vessels. Annapolis, Maryland: Naval Institute Press. ISBN 0-87021-790-9.
- Kelly, Patrick J. (2011). Tirpitz and the Imperial German Navy. Bloomington, Indiana: Indiana University Press. ISBN 978-0-253-35593-5.
- Nottelmann, Dirk (2022). Wright, Christopher C. (ed.). "From "Wooden Walls" to "New-Testament Ships": The Development of the German Armored Cruiser 1854–1918, Part I: "Humble Beginnings"". Warship International. LIX (2): 102–129. ISSN 0043-0374.
- Lyon, David & Winfield, Rif (2004). The Sail and Steam Navy List: All the Ships of the Royal Navy 1815–1889. Chatham Publishing. ISBN 978-1-86176-032-6. OCLC 52620555.
