= SMS Amazone (1843) =

Three-masted sail corvette of the Prussian Navy

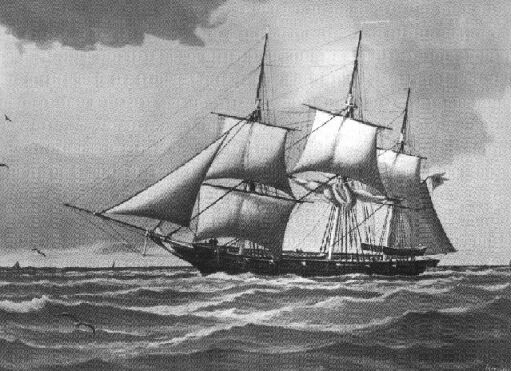
- SMS Amazone

History

Prussia
- Name: SMS Amazone
- Ordered: 1839
- Builder: Carmesins Werft, Stettin
- Laid down: 1842
- Launched: 24 June 1843
- Commissioned: 19 May 1844
- Refit: Königliche Werft Danzig, 1852
- Fate: Sunk 14 November 1861 off the coast of the Netherlands

General characteristics
- Displacement: 390 tonnes (380 long tons)
- Length: 33.49 m (109 ft 11 in)
- Beam: 8.99 m (29 ft 6 in)
- Draft: 3.14 m (10 ft 4 in)
- Sail plan: 876 square metres (9,430 sq ft)
- Speed: 11 knots (20 km/h; 13 mph)
- Boats & landing craft carried: 1 large, 3 small
- Complement: 6 officers, 139 men (including cadets)
- Armament: 12 18-pounders

SMS Amazone was a three-masted sail corvette (caravel) of the Prussian Navy (Preußische Marine). Her keel was laid down in Grabow near Stettin in 1842 and she was launched on 24 June 1843. Amazone sank in a storm on 14 November 1861 off the coast of the Netherlands with 107 dead. She was reported to have collided with an East Indiaman, which rescued the three survivors. Among the dead were "almost all" of the naval cadets being trained to officer the fleet.

Amazone was modelled on the French corvette Diligente, with a ship displacement of 370 tonnes and a length overall of 44 metres (144 ft). She had a complement of 145 men and was armed with twelve Swedish 18-pounders.

The ship served as a training vessel for Prussian naval officers of the Navigation School in Danzig, therefore it came under the Ministry of Finance rather than the Ministry of War. Nevertheless, she flew the Prussian war flag.
