= North German Federal Navy =

North German Federal Navy (NDBM)
- Active: 9 November 1867 – 1871
- Country: North German Confederation
- Type: Navy
- Engagements: Franco-Prussian War

Insignia
- War Ensign (1867–1871)

- Naval Jack (1867-1871)

The North German Federal Navy (German: Norddeutsche Bundesmarine or Marine des Norddeutschen Bundes) was the Navy of the North German Confederation, formed out of the Prussian Navy in 1867. It was eventually succeeded by the Imperial German Navy in 1871.

In the war against France, in 1870–1871, the navy encountered enemy forces on a few occasions. These included several minor skirmishes in the North and Baltic Seas between German coastal forces and the French blockade fleet, along with the Battle of Havana between the gunboat Meteor and the French aviso Bouvet. In general, due to its small size and frequent mechanical problems with most of the ironclad warships then in service, the navy did not play a significant role in the war. On the other hand, the French navy found it difficult to employ its far superior fleet for a landing operation at the Prussian coasts, owing to the decisive defeats the French suffered on land.

== See also ==
- Marine-Regatta-Verein
- Navy League (Germany)
- Reichsflotte (Fleet of the Realm)
- Imperial German Navy
- Reichsmarine (Navy of the Realm)
- Kriegsmarine (War Navy)
- Bundesmarine
- Volksmarine
- German Navy since 1995
