= SMS Frauenlob =

Three ships of the German Kaiserliche Marine (Imperial Navy) have been named SMS Frauenlob:

- SMS Frauenlob (1855), a schooner lost in a typhoon during the Eulenburg expedition in 1860
- SMS Frauenlob (1902), a light cruiser of the Gazelle class sunk during World War I.
- SMS Frauenlob (1918), a light cruiser of the Cöln class that was under construction during World War I but was never finished.
