= SMS Arcona (1858) =

Steam frigate

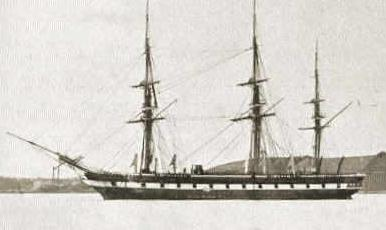
- Arcona at anchor

History

Prussia
- Name: SMS Arcona
- Namesake: Cape Arcona
- Builder: Königliche Werft, Danzig
- Laid down: 1855
- Launched: 19 May 1858
- Commissioned: 15 April 1859
- Decommissioned: 25 February 1884
- Stricken: 18 March 1884
- Fate: Broken up

General characteristics
- Class & type: Arcona-class frigate
- Displacement: 2,391 t (2,353 long tons)
- Length: 71.95 m (236 ft 1 in)
- Beam: 13 m (42 ft 8 in)
- Draft: 5.55 m (18 ft 3 in)
- Installed power: 4 × fire-tube boilers; 1,365 PS (1,346 ihp)
- Propulsion: 1 × marine steam engine; 1 × screw propeller
- Sail plan: Full-rigged ship
- Speed: 12.4 knots (23.0 km/h; 14.3 mph)
- Range: 1,150 nmi (2,130 km; 1,320 mi) at 11 knots (20 km/h; 13 mph)
- Complement: 35 officers; 345 enlisted men
- Armament: 6 × 68-pounder guns; 20 × 36 pounder guns

SMS Arcona was the lead ship of the Arcona class of steam frigates built for the Prussian Navy in the late 1850s and early 1860s. The class comprised five ships, and were the first major steam-powered warships ordered for the Prussian Navy. The ships were ordered as part of a major construction program to strengthen the nascent Prussian fleet, under the direction of Prince Adalbert, and were intended to provide defense against the Royal Danish Navy. Arcona was armed with a battery of twenty-six guns, and was capable of steaming at a speed of 12.4 knots (23.0 km/h; 14.3 mph). Arona was laid down in 1855, launched in 1858, and commissioned in 1859.

Arcona spent the first two years of her career leading the Eulenburg expedition as the squadron flagship; the mission took the ship to East Asia to support diplomatic efforts with the Kingdom of Siam, Qing China, and Tokugawa Japan. Arcona next saw service during the Second Schleswig War in 1864, once again serving as the flagship of a squadron led by Eduard von Jachmann, which briefly engaged the Danish Navy in the Battle of Jasmund in March. She saw no action during the Austro-Prussian War in 1866, as the Austrian Navy remained in the Adriatic Sea during the short conflict. The ship passed into the service of the North German Federal Navy, which was created by the Prussian-dominated North German Confederation after their victory in the war with Austria.

The ship embarked on another major overseas cruise in 1869, this time to the eastern Mediterranean Sea for the opening ceremonies of the Suez Canal, followed by a cruise in the Caribbean Sea. She was still there when the Franco-Prussian War broke out in July 1870, and she soon stopped in the neutral Azores, where she remained safe from blockading French warships; she sailed to Portugal in November, where the French pursued and trapped her until the end of the war in January 1871. Arcona passed into the service of a third German navy, the Kaiserliche Marine (Imperial Navy) of the new German Empire. She made another major overseas voyage from 1873 to 1875, visiting East Asia and North and South America. The ship was used for limited training duties in the late 1870s and early 1880s, but her poor condition led to her being struck from the naval register in 1884. Briefly used as a target ship, she was broken up soon thereafter.

== Design ==
In the immediate aftermath of the First Schleswig War against Denmark, Prince Adalbert began drawing up plans for the future of the Prussian Navy; he also secured the Jade Treaty that saw the port of Wilhelmshaven transferred to Prussia from the Duchy of Oldenburg, and which provided the Prussian fleet with an outlet on the North Sea. Adalbert called for a force of three screw frigates and six screw corvettes to protect Prussian maritime trade in the event of another war with Denmark. Design work was carried out between 1854 and 1855, and the first two ships were authorized in November 1855; a further pair was ordered in June 1860, and the final member of the class was ordered in February 1866.

Arcona was 71.95 meters (236 ft 1 in) long overall and had a beam of 13 m (42 ft 8 in) and a draft of 5.55 m (18 ft 3 in) forward. She displaced 1,928 metric tons (1,898 long tons) as designed and 2,391 t (2,353 long tons) at full load. The ship had short forecastle and sterncastle decks. Her superstructure consisted primarily of a small deckhouse aft. She had a crew of 35 officers and 345 enlisted men.

Her propulsion system consisted of a single horizontal single-expansion steam engine driving a single screw propeller, with steam supplied by four coal-burning fire-tube boilers. Exhaust was vented through a single funnel located amidships. Arcona was rated to steam at a top speed of 8 knots (15 km/h; 9.2 mph), but she significantly exceeded this speed, reaching 12.4 knots (23.0 km/h; 14.3 mph) from 1,365 metric horsepower (1,346 ihp). The ship had a cruising radius of about 1,150 nautical miles (2,130 km; 1,320 mi) at a speed of 11 knots (20 km/h; 13 mph). To supplement the steam engine on long voyages abroad, she carried a full-ship rig with a total surface area of 2,200 m^{2} (24,000 sq ft). The screw could be retracted while cruising under sail.

Arcona was armed with a battery of six 68-pounder guns and twenty 36-pounder guns. By 1870, she had been rearmed with a uniform battery of seventeen 15 cm (5.9 in) RK L/22 guns; later in her career, the number of these guns was reduced to eight.

== Service history ==
The keel for Arcona was laid down at the Königliche Werft (Royal Dockyard) in Danzig in 1855; the specific date has not survived, but according to Dirk Nottelmann, the available evidence suggests work began the same day as work on her sister ship Gazelle, on 5 December. It had been planned to complete work on the ship by early 1857, but a series of difficulties delayed completion. The original designer, Johan Gjerling, resigned from the project in June 1856, leaving the task of completing the ship to Carl Elbertzhagen, who replaced him as the navy's chief constructor. Elbertzhagen needed to make a series of alterations to the plans for the ship, including some significant details that had not been sketched by Gjerling at all, including the shape of the stern or the size of propeller to be fitted. By June 1857, the design work had been completed and the hull planking was finished. Though the ship was theoretically ready to be launched at this point, work on the ship's propulsion system had not been completed, and more importantly, the stretch of the Vistula in front of the shipyard had not been dredged deep enough to allow a ship the size of Arcona to pass through. This work had not been completed by December, when the annual freezing of the river precluded any thought of launching the ship until Spring on 1858.

Named for Cape Arcona on the island of Rügen, she was launched on 19 May 1858 but without a formal ceremony. This was in part due to lack of funding for an elaborate event; Prince Adalbert and fifty observers used a platform hastily constructed from scrap wood left over from building the ship. Initial tests of her propulsion system were done in late 1858. After completing fitting out work, she was commissioned into active service on 15 April 1859 to begin sea trials; Arcona was the first screw-propelled ship of the Prussian Navy. During her initial testing, which lasted until October that year, the ship had no formal commander, and was directed instead by a series officers assigned to the shipyard in Danzig. Final work in the shipyard proceeded as quickly as possible, as Arcona was scheduled to be sent to East Asia to protect Prussian economic interests there.

=== Eulenberg expedition ===
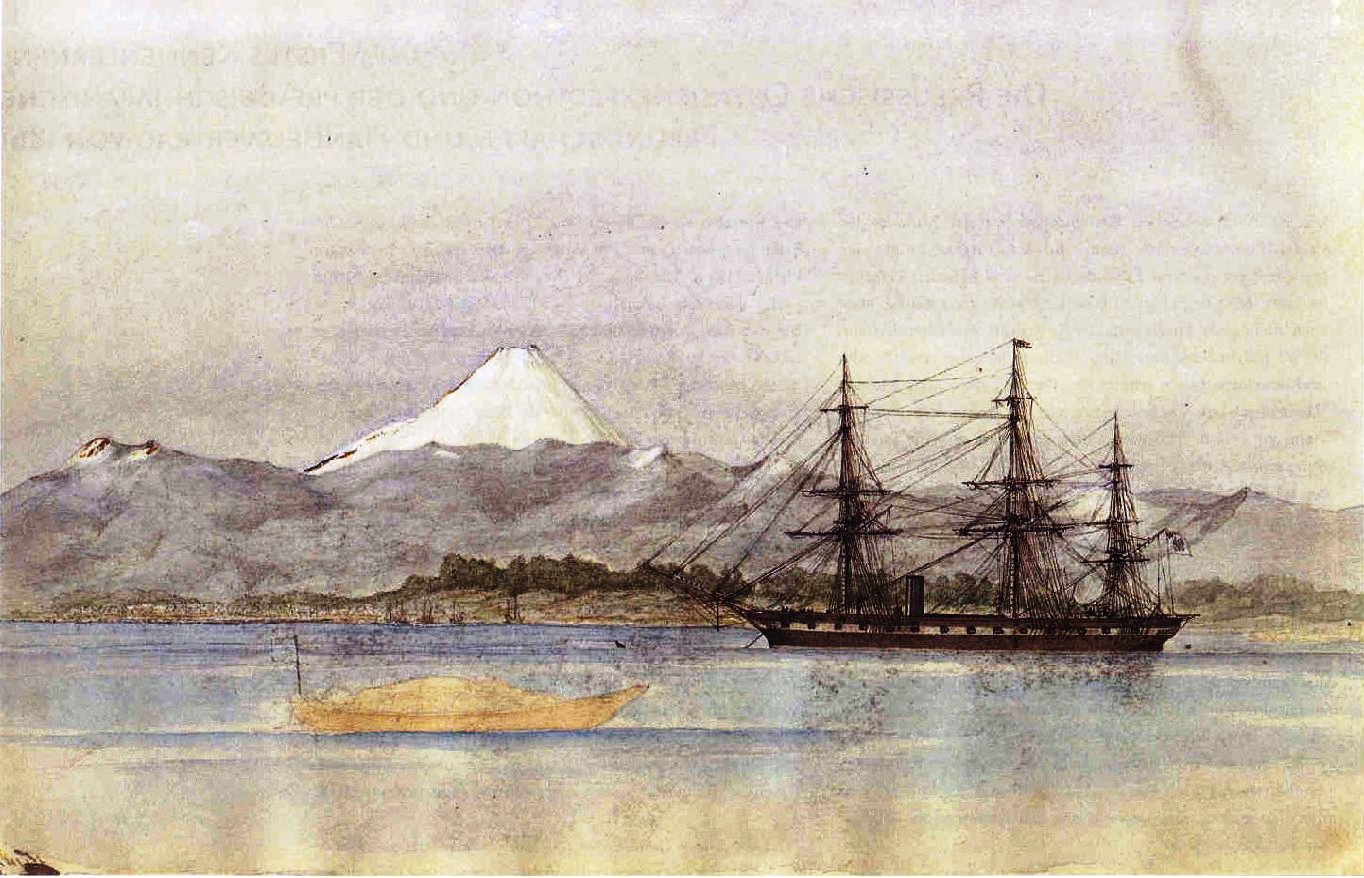
Painting of Arcona in Yokohama, Japan

Beginning in the early decades of the 19th century, most other European powers had negotiated trade agreements with several of the East Asian states, principally China, Japan, and Siam, but Prussia had not (nor had any of the other German states). This left German merchants at a disadvantage, and Arcona was to take Friedrich Albrecht zu Eulenburg to negotiate trade treaties on behalf of the German Zollverein (Customs Union). This mission became known as the Eulenburg expedition. Arcona was placed under the command of Kapitän zur See (KzS—Captain at Sea) Hinrik Sundewall, who was given the temporary rank of kommodore for the expedition, since he was to command a squadron that also included the sail frigate Thetis, the schooner Frauenlob, and the civilian vessel Elbe, which the navy purchased to support the mission. The very small Prussian Navy had great difficulty providing crews for the four vessels, and had to resort from transferring men from other ships, calling up conscripts, and hiring volunteers, all of whom required extensive training to prepare them for the lengthy voyage.

On 11 December 1859, Arcona departed Prussia and stopped first in Portsmouth, where repairs to storm damage had to be effected at the Royal Shipyard there. Arcona was ready to resume the voyage on 12 April 1860, and she met the rest of the squadron at Rio de Janeiro, Brazil, later that year. From there, the ships sailed around the Cape of Good Hope, crossed the Indian Ocean, and stopped in Anjer on the island of Java before eventually arriving at Singapore on 23 July. There, the ships embarked the diplomats and their staffs, as they had traveled there independently, either by rail or passenger ships. Because China was currently engaged in the Second Opium War against Britain and France, the Prussians decided to visit Japan first; the squadron arrived off Japan on 1 September, but a powerful typhoon sank Frauenlob and prevented the rest of the ships from anchoring at Tokyo for three days. After lengthy negotiations, which were exacerbated by Prussia's demand to represent not just itself but some thirty other German members of the Zollverein, the Treaty of Amity and Commerce between Prussia and Japan was finally concluded on 24 January 1861. The ships departed Tokyo four days later, stopping in Yokohama and Nagasaki on the way to China. Arcona frequently had to tow Thetis due to calm winds. By 1 March, the squadron had arrived in the mouth of the Yangtze river, and they anchored in Shanghai three days later. The following day, the crews of each ship swore allegiance to King Wilhelm I, who had replaced his deceased brother since the ships had left Prussia.

The political situation in China was still disturbed by the Second Opium War, which had ended late the last year. Eulenberg had expected to conduct negotiations in Shanghai, but this was not possible, and so Arcona and the rest of the squadron moved to Yantai on 23 April and then continued on to the mouth of the Hai River five days later; from there, Eulenberg and the other diplomats traveled over land to Tientsin. Over the coming months, Arcona and the other ships made routine trips from there to Yantai to maintain the mail connection with Germany. During this period, the ship also visited a number of ports in the area. On 2 September, the diplomats had concluded a trade treaty and thereafter returned to the Hai, where they boarded the ships on 13 September. Eulenberg had hoped to secure a colony for Prussia in the Far East, such as the island of Taiwan, but he realized that he lacked the manpower for a commitment of that size, and he did not want to jeopardize the treaty with China. Arcona led the squadron south to Siam, stopping in Nagasaki, Hong Kong, and Macao on the way, before anchoring off Paknam on 15 December. The ensuing negotiations with the Siamese government produced a trade agreement on 7 February 1862, permitting the Prussians to depart on 24 February for Singapore. There, the diplomats left the ships on 2 March to return home by rail or passenger ships.

At that time, the squadron was disbanded and the ships dispersed, Thetis going to South America while Arcona returned home. She stopped in Cape Town on 14 May and had reached Portsmouth by early August. There, Prince Adalbert of Prussia inspected the ship. Arcona was in need of major repairs by that point, which were carried out at Devonport. Part of the crew were sent home early, and by 17 September, the ship was ready to resume the voyage. She arrived in Danzig on 5 October, having spent 2 years, 8 months, and 27 days abroad. Arcona was decommissioned there on 22 November. The voyage proved to be an invaluable experience for the navy, which was still in its very early stage of development. It was also politically unifying, as the Prussian Landtag (State Diet) voted to pay the cost of the expedition nearly unanimously, despite the ongoing conflict between the left-wing German Progress Party and the government of Chancellor Otto von Bismarck.

=== Second Schleswig War ===
Illustration of a Prussian squadron in 1864; Arcona is in the center

Arcona was thoroughly overhaul in early 1863, and by the autumn, it had become clear that conflict with Denmark over the Schleswig–Holstein question was imminent, after the new Danish King Christian IX attempted to assert direct control over Schleswig with a new constitution. Arcona was moved to Swinemünde in November, where she was recommissioned on 10 December, under the command of Leutnant zur See (Lieutenant at Sea) Reinhold von Werner. After the start of the Second Schleswig War in February 1864, Werner was replaced by KzS Eduard von Jachmann, who took command of all Prussian naval forces in the Baltic Sea. At that time, the Prussians also had available the steam corvette Nymphe, the avisos Grille and Loreley, and five divisions of gunboats. The Prussians again had great difficulty assembling enough crews for all of the ships, particularly trained engine room personnel. In addition, it was badly outnumbered by the much larger Royal Danish Navy, which soon attempted to implement a blockade of the Prussian coast; the Danish blockade squadron consisted of a steam-powered ship of the line, Skjold, the steam frigate Sjælland, and a pair of steam corvettes, Heimdal and Thor. It was supported by other warships, including the steam frigate Tordenskjold.

The Danes began seizing Prussian merchant ships in the area, prompting Admiral Prince Adalbert, the commander of the Prussian Navy, to begin plans for an operation against the blockade using Jachmann's squadron. By mid-March, the Prussian ships were ready for action and the ice had receded far enough that Prince Adalbert ordered Jachmann to conduct a reconnaissance of the blockading force on 16 March. Two days before, the Danish blockade squadron commanded by Rear Admiral Edvard van Dockum had arrived off Swinemünde. Arcona and Nymphe patrolled off Greifswald, but the weather was poor, with snow showers hampering visibility. The Prussian gunboats, led by Loreley, remained closer to Swinemünde. Jachmann spotted three vessels at around 15:30, but there was not enough time before dark to catch them. Instead, Jachmann turned back to Swinemünde, intending to try again the following day.

==== Battle of Jasmund ====
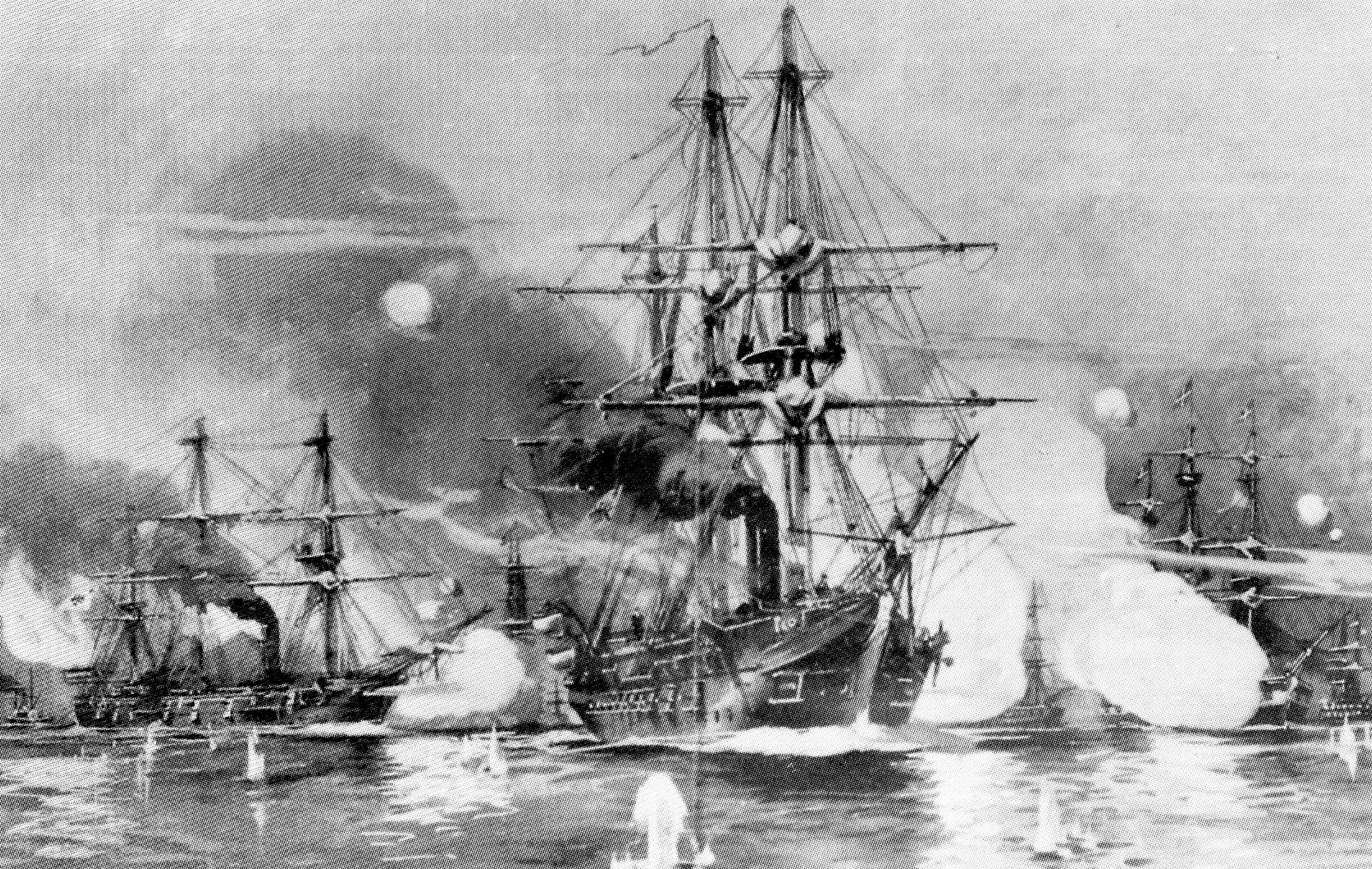
Arcona leading the Prussian squadron at the Battle of Jasmund

The next morning, at 07:30, Jachmann took his ships out of the mouth of the Oder, initially steaming east. Unable to locate any Danish warships, the Prussians turned west and, as they approached the island of Greifswalder Oie, lookouts aboard the ships spotted smoke to the northwest at about 13:15. The Prussians continued on toward the island of Rügen; off the Jasmund Peninsula, Jachmann's ships encountered Dockum's squadron. There, with Arcona and Nymphe in the lead, Jachmann turned to engage the Danes; Loreley increased speed to join the two corvettes while Jachmann sent the gunboats to the coast of Rügen, where they could be used to cover his withdrawal. From further north, Dockum was awaiting the arrival of the steam frigate Tordenskjold.

At 14:30, Arcona opened fire, targeting the frigate Sjælland; a few minutes later, after Sjælland closed to 1,500 meters (1,600 yd), Dockum turned his flagship to starboard and began firing broadsides at Arcona. Jachmann turned Arcona to starboard as well, having realized the strength of the Danish squadron. He failed to inform the captains of Nymphe and Loreley of his decision to withdraw, and they continued to steam east for several minutes before they conformed to his maneuver. At this time, Dockum shifted fire to Nymphe and scored several hits, including damage to her funnel that reduced her speed temporarily. Dockum attempted to overtake and cut off Nymphe and Loreley from Arcona, but Nymphe's crew was able to quickly repair the damage she had sustained, allowing her to increase speed, though she continued to take hits.

Nymphe and Loreley came under heavy fire from the pursuing Danish squadron; at 16:00 Loreley broke off to the west toward Stralsund and Dockum allowed her to leave, preferring to continue after Jachmann's corvettes. Both sides continued to score hits on each other until they checked fire at around 16:45 as the range grew too long. By 18:00, Dockum ended the chase and steamed off to the east, allowing Jachmann to return to Swinemünde. In the course of the fighting, Arcona had fired 156 shells and was hit six times in return, one of which struck the gun battery. Three men were killed and three others were wounded; those killed were buried in Swinemünde. Jachmann was promoted to the rank of konteradmiral (rear admiral) the following day for his actions in the battle, which were well received by the public. Nottelmann notes that the sortie accomplished little, and was "nothing more than a demonstration."

Arcona, now under the command of KK Hassenstein, next went to sea with three gunboats on 19 March to search the area north of Swinemünde, but no combat resulted. The Prussian fleet then made preparations to support operations by the army for a planned amphibious attack on the island of Als in late March, but bad weather prevented the attack. During a subsequent patrol on 9 April, the Prussians spotted four Danish warships off Swinemünde, but neither side sought an engagement, instead withdrawing from the area. Another sortie on 6 May produced a similar result. Six days later, the armistice that ended the fighting went into effect, and during the peace negotiations, Arcona and the other ships went on cruises in the western Baltic. Once the war ended in October, the squadron was disbanded and Arcona became a guard ship at the fleet's new naval base at Kiel.

=== 1865–1870 ===
Arcona remained stationed at Kiel for the next two years. The Austrian corvette SMS Erzherzog Friedrich joined her there on 8 May 1865, as the treaty that ended the Second Schleswig War established joint Prussian and Austrian control of the two duchies. In early 1866, Arcona served as the flagship of a squadron that also included her sister ships Gazelle and Hertha and the ironclad Arminius, which was sent on a training cruise in the Baltic, stopping in Sweden and Russia along the way. After the end of the operation, the squadron was disbanded and Arcona returned to guard duties in Kiel. After the start of the Austro-Prussian War later that year, Arcona was mobilized into a squadron that also included Hertha, Gazelle, the screw corvettes Augusta and Victoria, and the gunboat Scorpion, but they saw no action during the short conflict, in part because the Austrian Erzherzog Friedrich had already returned home. Additionally, the attitude of Denmark remained uncertain, and so the Prussian Navy was unable to send warships to the Mediterranean Sea to attack Austria directly. While on a training cruise during the war, Arcona ran aground outside Kiel, and had to be pulled free by Victoria. A set of training exercises were conducted after the war ended on 23 August, and by 17 September, the squadron was disbanded. Arcona was decommissioned in Kiel on 30 October for repairs that began the next year.

On 18 February 1869, Arcona returned to active service under the command of KzS Heinrich Köhler. The ship was scheduled to be deployed to the West Indies, but a storm drove the ship aground on 4 March while she was steaming from Danzig to Neufahrwasser. She instead had to return to Danzig for initial repairs before moving to Swinemünde for additional work. The ship thereafter moved to the North Sea to participate in the opening ceremonies of the new naval base at Wilhelmshaven in Jade Bay. Arcona then returned to Swinemünde for yet more repair work, and on 31 July, she was decommissioned at Kiel so her crew could be used on other ships. Arcona did not remain out of service for long, however, and she was recommissioned again on 21 September to participate in the opening ceremonies for the Suez Canal. She would then embark on the previously planned cruise to the West Indies. At that time, she came under command of Korvettenkapitän (KK—Corvette Captain) Georg von Schleinitz. After departing Kiel on 6 October, Arcona was repeatedly damaged on the way to the Mediterranean, first in a collusion that required repairs at Greenhithe, United Kingdom; then in a storm in the Mediterranean that necessitated a stop in Valletta, Malta, for more repairs. After arriving at the entrance to the Suez Canal on 15 November, Arcona anchored next to one of her opponents from Jasmund: Sjælland. The North German contingent also included Hertha, their sister Elisabeth, the aviso Grille, and the gunboat Delphin.

While Arcona was leaving the canal zone, she struck a reef twice, damaging her hull, which required another stop in Valletta for work that lasted from 16 to 29 December. From there, she continued west across the Atlantic Ocean, eventually arriving in Saint Thomas in the Danish West Indies on 4 March 1870. Arcona next sailed to Haiti to negotiate payment of a debt owed by the Haitian government to a Prussian business. While entering the harbor at Gonaïves, Haiti, an incorrectly lit signal light led Arcona to run aground on a coral reef, though she was able to free herself. After the Haitian government made assurances that the debt would be paid, the ship departed south to visit Venezuela; along the way, she stopped at the small, uninhabited island of Culebra, which Schleinitz recommended the Prussian government purchase for use as a coaling station. The ship then continued on to Venezuela, and on 4 April, the ship sent a landing party ashore at La Guaira to guard the Europeans in the city from insurgent forces. While there, the ship suffered an outbreak of yellow fever, which forced Schleinitz to depart, but fifty men died; this was the only major fever epidemic to affect the Prussian Navy. Arcona initially stopped in Saint Thomas, where she met the gunboat SMS Meteor; she transferred a 15 cm (5.9 in) gun that she had carried from Prussia for the gunboat. The ship continued north to New York City, United States, where she received orders to stay for two months on 29 April.

=== Franco-Prussian War ===
On 10 July, Arcona received orders to meet the ironclad squadron that had just begun a training cruise to the Azores, where she was to exchange crews and take on a contingent of naval cadets. She would then return to the West Indies for another six months of training for the cadets. But on 22 July, while en route to Horta, Azores, Arcona encountered a Portuguese mail steamer that informed Schleinitz about the sharply rising tensions between France and the German states, the likelihood of war breaking out, and the recall of the ironclad squadron. The mail steamer also carried a letter from Prince Adalbert instructing Schleinitz to either intern his ship in a neutral port or attempt to bypass the powerful French Navy by sailing around Scotland. The latter sent a detachment of 8 officers and 24 sailors home on a merchant vessel so they could be employed on other warships and sent a message informing Adalbert of his decision to attempt to attack French warships in the area, owing to the poor weather in the North Sea. An initial attempt to catch what Schleinitz believed to be an unarmed steamship nearly ended in disaster for the Prussians when the ship turned out to be the ironclad Montcalm, and while turning to flee, Arcona's engine broke down. She reached the neutral Portuguese waters of the Azores under sail before Montcalm could catch her.

Schleinitz and the crew set about preparing the ship for combat, but determined that the propulsion system was in poor condition, which would hamper the ship's abilities in battle. While cruising off the Azores, Arcona encountered the powerful French ironclad Montcalm, though she was able to escape the slower vessel and return to neutral waters in the Azores. Nevertheless, the French were able keep Arcona under surveillance. On 16 November, the steam frigate Bellone arrived and the French and Prussian consuls there arranged for the two frigates to duel. A severe storm cancelled the engagement, and on 1 January 1871, Schleinitz decided to attempt to sail for Lisbon, Portugal. By that time, Bellona had been driven off by a severe storm that had lasted more than a week. Arcona arrived there thirteen days later and entered the shipyard there for repairs needed after the ship was damaged in a storm. While the ship was there, the naval command in Berlin ordered Schleinitz to remain there and await the imminent end of the war. French warships patrolled outside Lisbon, but Arcona remained inside the port until the French signed the Armistice of Versailles, which ended the fighting. On 6 March, Arcona sailed for home, arriving in Wilhelmshanen on 6 May, where she was decommissioned. Several of the cadets had complained about the lack of activity during the war, and they were jailed for four months for insubordination.

=== Later career ===
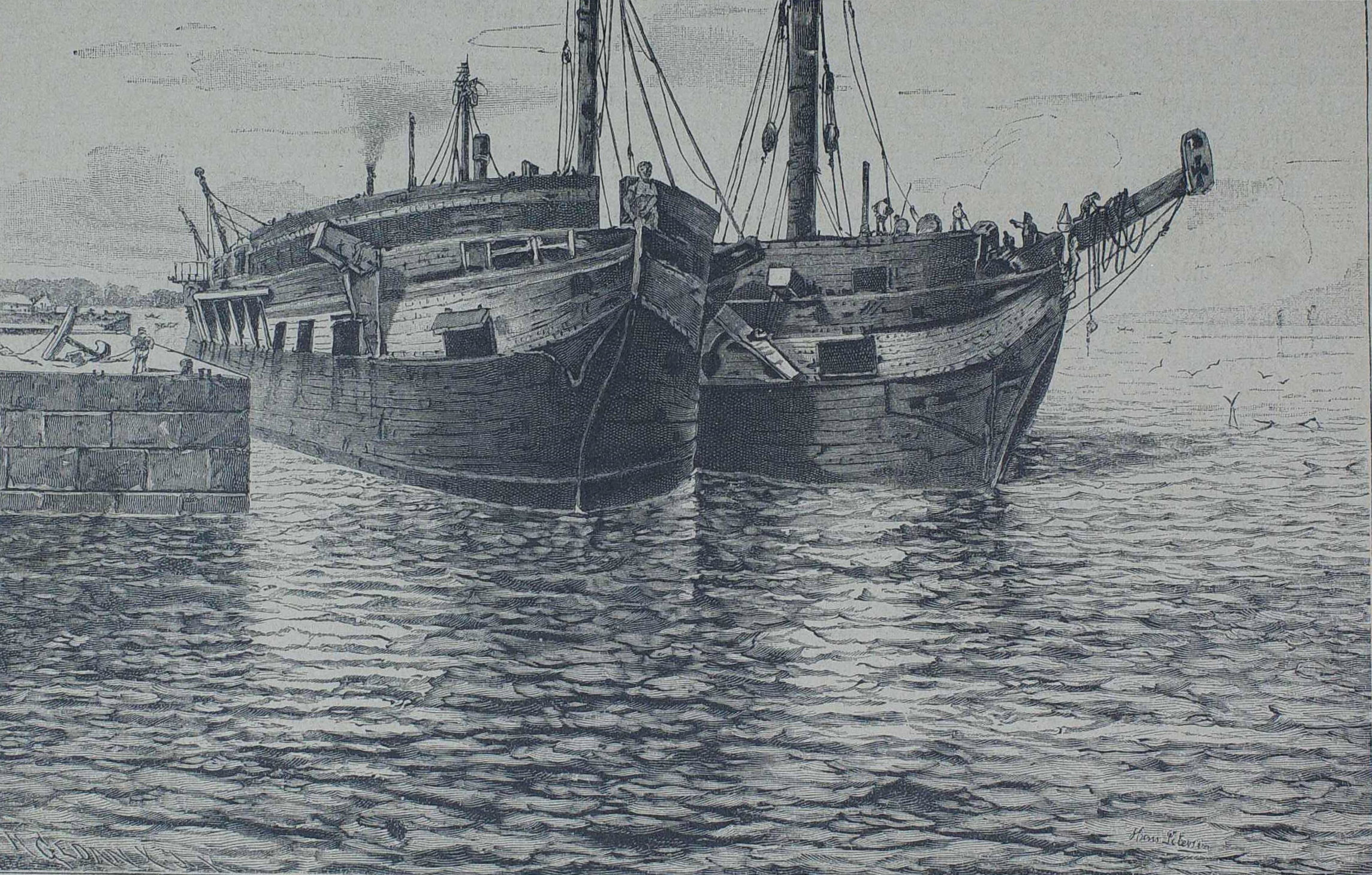
Hertha (left) and Arcona (right) tied up as hulks in the 1880s

Arcona was moved to Bremerhaven for a thorough overhaul in preparation for being reactivated to join the recently created training squadron, which included her sisters Hertha and Vineta, the corvette Ariadne, and the gunboat Nautilus. Arcona was recommissioned on 4 June 1873, once again under Schleinitz's command, though he would remain aboard the ship for the summer months, departing on 16 September. During this period, the ships of the training squadron conducted exercises in the North Sea and Baltic Sea on a voyage from Wilhelmshaven to Kiel. They then escorted the crown prince, Frederick on a cruise to Norway to represent the new German Empire at the coronation of King Oscar II. Stops included Trondheim and Oslo. During subsequent maneuvers in the Baltic, Arcona and Hertha accidentally collided, and Arcona had to stop in Kiel for repairs. The squadron returned to Kiel in September to be disbanded, and Arcona was decommissioned on 16 September, but was reactivated already on 1 October, now under the command of KK Paul von Reibnitz.

The ship was to embark on another major voyage around the world, this time as a training ship for naval cadets. In addition, she was to survey islands in the southern Indian Ocean for the upcoming 1874 transit of Venus that Germany intended to send an expedition to observe. The ship sailed from Kiel on 13 October, and by 31 January 1874, she had arrived off the Kerguelen Islands. Heavy fog prevented her from stopping there. Reibnitz nevertheless determined that the main island of Grande Terre would be a usable location for the expedition. Arcona continued on to Heard Island, but a severe storm kept the ship from anchoring there too. The ship sailed to Melbourne, Australia, where Reibnitz made his report to Berlin. She then moved to Sydney, where she stayed from 6 to 11 May. Arcona then sailed north to tour the islands of the central Pacific Ocean. During a stop at Levuka, Fiji, the Fijian king, Seru Epenisa Cakobau requested Germany establish a protectorate over the islands, a request he had previously made to other German warships that had visited the islands. Arcona then departed for Apia, Samoa, to try to settle debts owed to German businesses there.

Arcona left Apia on 7 June, bound for Yokohama, which she reached on 17 July. Upon arriving, she received orders instructing the crew to support one of the German expeditions to study the transit of Venus, which was to be held at Yantai. The scientists had already arrived there, and the ship's crew assisted them in building a station to observe the event. Arcona was used to carry the initial report to Nagasaki, where it was sent to Germany, after which she returned to Yantai to embark the scientists, as they had completed their work. The ship carried them back to Nagasaki on 10 February 1875, where they transferred to a commercial ship for the voyage home. Arcona cruised in Japanese waters for two months before receiving orders to return home. She left Japan on 5 April, crossing the Pacific and to sail around South America; this leg of the voyage was punctuated by stops in Honolulu, Hawaii, and Callao, Peru. While in the latter port, it was discovered that her foremast had begun to crack, which required immediate repairs. The only facility that could handle the work was in San Francisco, California, and so she was diverted there in early June. Arcona was the first German warship to visit the port. After repairs were completed, she resumed her voyage south, stopping in Valparaíso, Chile; Montevideo, Uruguay; Rio de Janeiro; Horta; and Plymouth, United Kingdom. While steaming off the coast of Denmark on 18 December, she ran aground off Jammerbugt, but was able to free herself. Arcona arrived in Kiel on 26 December and was decommissioned there five days later.

On 15 March 1876, Arcona was recommissioned, once again to serve as a training ship, but this time it would only be as a stationary vessel for engine and boiler room crews. The ship was in poor condition, however, and required repairs at the Kaiserliche Werft (Imperial Shipyard) in Danzig before training could be conducted; she was decommissioned on 17 May. The ship was employed in the same role in 1877, being recommissioned on 15 March; beginning this year, she also served as a guard ship in Kiel. Beginning in June, the ship came under the command of Reibnitz again, though by this time he had been promoted to kapitän zur see; he remained in command until November 1878. The ship saw the same activities in 1878. In 1879, Arcona's crew had to be used to man a pair of warships that were being built at the Howaldtswerke-Deutsche Werft shipyard for the Peruvian Navy; the country was in the middle of the War of the Pacific, and the Chilean government requested that Germany prevent the ships from sailing to join the conflict. Stationary training duties occupied the ship's activities for the next few years, and in 1883, she underwent repairs to her propulsion system in Kiel. Later that year, she participated in the annual fleet training exercises as a hospital ship before returning to training duties, now for the Seewehr. In poor condition by 1884 and not worth repairing, Arcona was decommissioned for the last time on 25 February. She was struck from the naval register on 18 March and used as a target ship before being scrapped in Kiel.
