= Eduard von Jachmann =

German admiral (1822–1887)

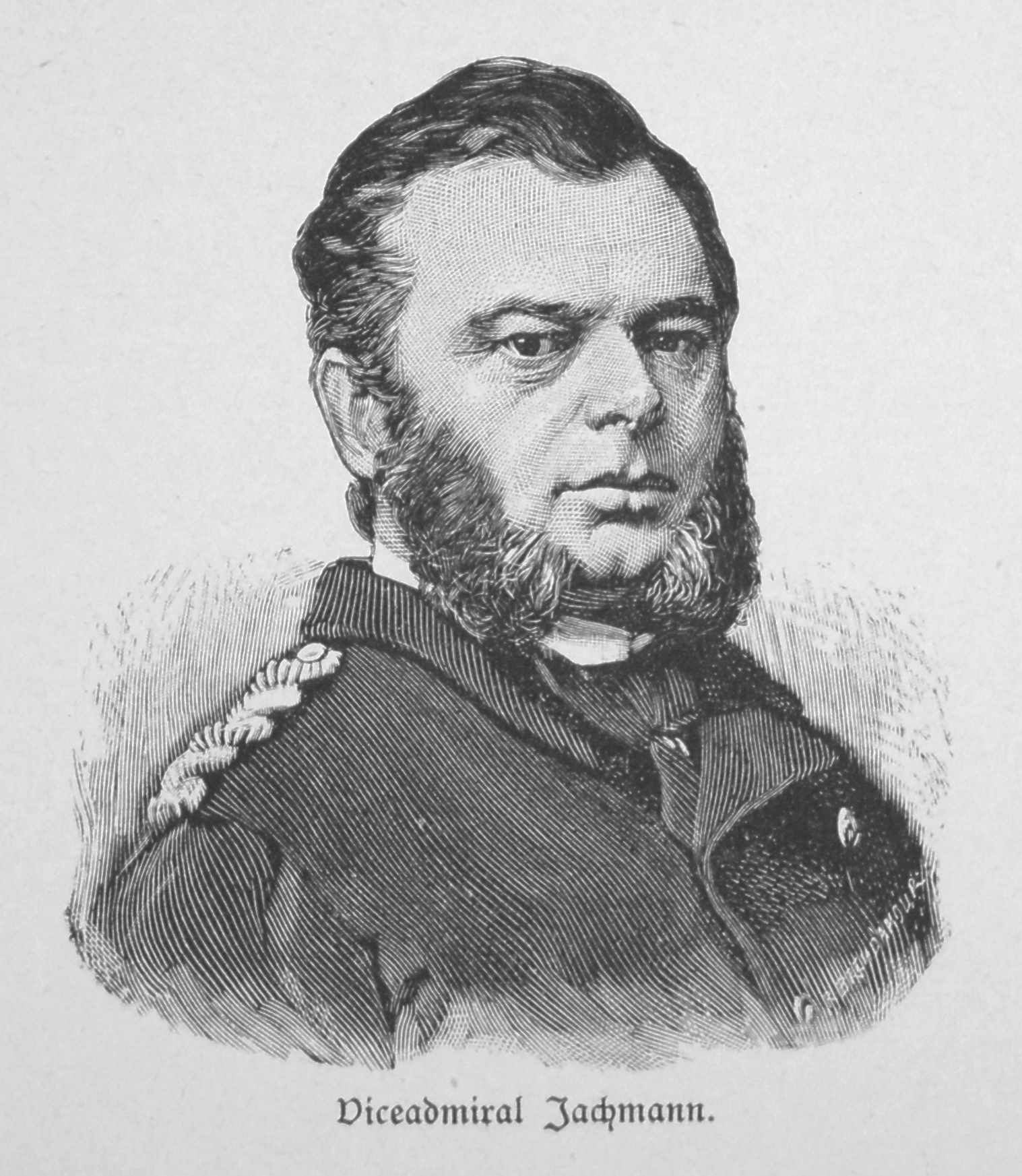
- Born: 2 March 1822; Danzig, Prussia
- Died: 21 October 1887 (aged 65) Oldenburg
- Allegiance: German Empire
- Branch: Preussische Marine; Norddeutsche Bundesmarine; Kaiserliche Marine
- Service years: 1852–1878
- Rank: Vizeadmiral
- Commands: SMS Amazone; SMS Thetis; SMS Arcona; Marinestation der Ostsee
- Conflicts: Second Schleswig War; Battle of Jasmund; Austro-Prussian War; Franco-Prussian War

Eduard Karl Emanuel von Jachmann (2 March 1822 – 21 October 1887) was the first Vizeadmiral (vice admiral) of the Prussian Navy. He entered the navy in the 1840s after initially serving in the merchant marine. In 1848, Jachmann received his first command, the corvette SMS Amazone; through the 1850s and early 1860s, he held several other commands, including the frigates Thetis—aboard which he took part in the Eulenburg expedition to East Asia—and Arcona. During the Second Schleswig War in 1864, he commanded Prussian naval forces in the Baltic from Arcona, and led a small squadron at the Battle of Jasmund on 17 March. Though defeated in that battle, he was promoted to Konteradmiral (rear admiral) for his aggressive handling of the Prussian fleet.

Jachmann was the senior-most officer in the Prussian Navy by the mid-1860s, second only to Prince Adalbert of Prussia. In 1867, Jachmann became the director of the Ministry of the Navy, and the following year, he was promoted to Vizeadmiral. During the Franco-Prussian War of 1870–1871, he commanded the squadron of ironclad warships based in the North Sea, though his ships saw no action owing to engine difficulties. After the war, he oversaw the founding of the Imperial Naval Academy at Kiel and the organization of the North Sea Naval Station. He expected to be named the first Chief of the Imperial Admiralty in 1872, but he was passed over in favor of the Prussian Army General Albrecht von Stosch. Embittered by the decision, Jachmann retired from the navy in 1874.

Jachmann retired to Oldenburg with his family, though he returned to naval affairs in 1878 following the accidental sinking of Grosser Kurfürst during a training cruise. Jachmann used the incident to attack Stosch, first through anonymously published letters criticizing his training program, and then as part of a court martial that placed blame for the accident on Carl Ferdinand Batsch, Stosch's protege. Jachmann thereafter left the public eye until his death on 21 October 1887.

== Early life ==
Jachmann was born in Danzig on 2 March 1822, the youngest of seven children, to Dr. R. H. Jachmann and Minna Jachmann (née Schaff). Eduard attended grammar school in Marienwerder. Against his father's wishes, Jachmann joined the merchant marine as a cabin boy in Danzig in 1839; at the time, it was uncommon for an educated young man to join the shipping industry. Over the winter of 1842–1843, he attended the navigation school in Danzig and he passed his examination on 20 March 1843. He also served aboard ships on voyages to the Americas into 1844.

== Naval career ==
In early 1843, as the Prussian Navy looked forward to the completion of the corvette SMS Amazone, it began searching for cadets at the Danzig navigational school to form the ship's crew. Jachmann was one of those studying at the school recruited into the navy; Jachmann came aboard the ship in 1844 while it was made available to the school for training purposes. During a training cruise that lasted from June to October 1845, Jachmann held one of the officer positions aboard the vessel, but he had not been officially promoted to officer rank. The cruise went into the Atlantic Ocean and into the Mediterranean Sea, and included stops in London, Genoa, Algiers, Madiera, and Portsmouth. Another Mediterranean cruise followed in July 1846; Jachmann served as the ship's executive officer, second in command to the captain, Jan Schröder, a Dutch officer who had been hired to provide naval expertise.

Illustration of the corvette SMS Amazone, Jachmann's first command

On 27 May 1847, he was formally promoted to second lieutenant. A fourth training cruise followed four days later, lasting until October. On their return, Jachmann and the other officers were sent to winter quarters in Danzig. In November 1848, during the Revolutions of 1848 and the concurrent First Schleswig War against Denmark, Schröder was promoted and Jachmann succeeded him as Amazone's commander. Jachmann was promoted to first lieutenant on 29 March 1849. He took Amazone to Stettin for operations against the Danish fleet. She saw no action, however, as the Danes focused their attention on the larger Reichsflotte (Imperial Fleet) in Bremen. On 15 July 1850, the Danish blockade fleet entered Swinemünde and seized several Prussian vessels; Jachmann did not sortie to recapture the vessels, which cast suspicion on him and nearly cost him his command. Amazone, of only 356 metric tons (350 long tons; 392 short tons), was too weak to challenge the Danish and the only other Prussian vessels in the area were small gunboats of even lesser value as warships. As a result, Jachmann was exonerated.

Through the 1850s, Jachmann held a variety of roles. He served as the executive officer aboard the frigate SMS Gefion, again as the commander of Amazone, and as the shipyard director at the Königliche Werft (Royal Shipyard) in Danzig. During this period, Jachmann commanded a flotilla of ten gunboats during exercises in July and August 1851. In 1855, Jachmann was promoted to the rank of Korvettenkapitän (Corvette Captain). On 3 December 1856, he was appointed as the Director of the Technical Department of the Admiralty. Jachmann was promoted again in 1859, to the rank of Kapitän zur See (KzS—Captain at Sea). By this time, Jachmann was the third highest-ranking officer in the Prussian Navy, behind only Prince Adalbert of Prussia and the Swedish captain Henrik Sundewall.

From 1859 to 1862, he commanded the frigate SMS Thetis during the Eulenburg expedition to East Asia. Sundewall, the squadron commander, flew his flag aboard the frigate SMS Arcona; in addition to Thetis, his command also included the schooner SMS Frauenlob and the clipper ship Elbe. The ships, without Elbe as she sailed to Singapore directly, sailed to Rio de Janeiro and then to Cape Town before meeting with Elbe in Singapore. There, the squadron embarked the diplomat Friedrich Albrecht zu Eulenburg. On arriving in China, Eulenberg concluded a trade treaty with the Qing government. On the way back to Germany, Jachmann had been instructed to investigate Patagonia as the site of a possible German colony, but he ignored the command, citing the poor condition of his ship after the long voyage to East Asia, and in particular after a severe storm had badly damaged her in South American waters. Indeed, Jachmann had to put into Salvador, Bahia in Brazil for repairs.

=== Wars of German unification ===
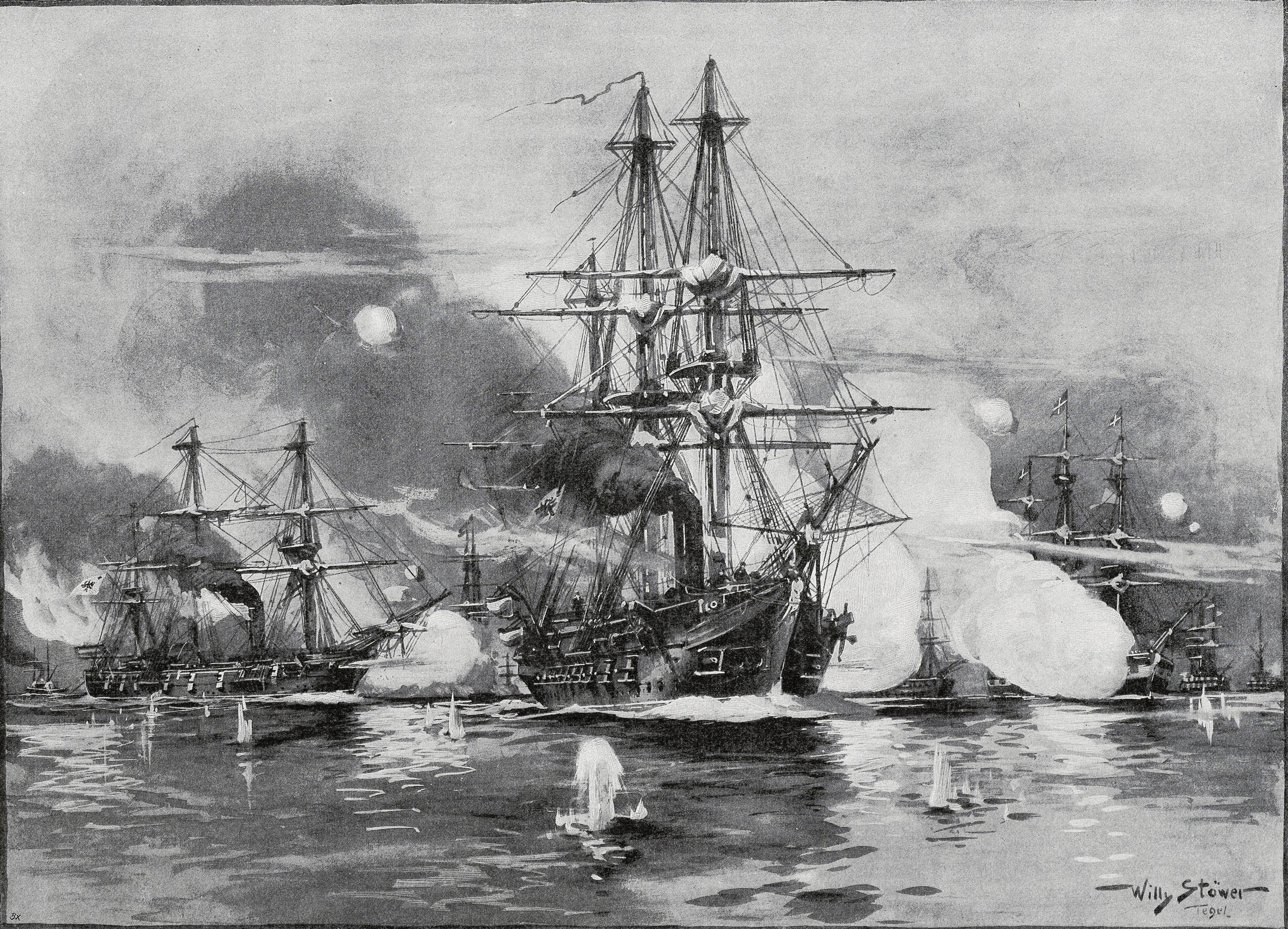
Painting of the Battle of Jasmund, depicting the Prussian squadron, by Willy Stöwer

At the start of the Second Schleswig War in 1864, the bulk of the Prussian fleet was concentrated in the Baltic Sea. Prince Adalbert was the senior navy commander, and Jachmann, as the senior-most captain, became the squadron commander, with Arcona as his flagship. The much larger Danish fleet blockaded Prussia's main ports, trapping Jachmann's ships—Arcona and SMS Nymphe—in Swinemünde. On 17 March, Jachmann took his two ships and the armed paddle steamer SMS Loreley out to challenge the Danish blockade force. In the ensuing Battle of Jasmund off the island of Rügen, Jachmann's squadron was defeated by the more powerful Danish squadron and forced to retreat. This was to be the only major naval battle fought in the Baltic during the war. Nevertheless, he was appointed Konteradmiral (Rear Admiral) for his aggressive handling of the fleet at Jasmund. The arrival of a Danish ironclad warship precluded any further attacks on the Danish fleet, as the traditional guns that armed Jachmann's ships were entirely useless against the armored vessel.

On 24 March 1865, with the fleet having returned to its demobilized, peacetime status, Jachmann was given command of the Marinestation der Ostsee (Naval Station of the Baltic Sea). Later that year, Jachmann moved the fleet to its new main base at Kiel in the newly annexed Duchy of Schleswig. There, he was responsible for establishing the new base, the land defenses for which were established at Hörup Haff and Holtenau Bay under the direction of Generals Helmuth von Moltke, the Chief of the General Staff, and Albrecht von Roon, the Prussian Minister of War. Later that year, Jachmann accompanied Roon aboard Loreley for a survey of the Jade Bay, where the naval base at Wilhelmshaven was planned. Jachmann remained in his post in the Baltic Sea during the Austro-Prussian War, commanding the main squadron of frigates and corvettes. Before the outset of hostilities, he sent the gunboat Tiger to Elbe to block the movement of an Austrian brigade that was garrisoned in Holstein. Since the Austrian fleet was occupied with Prussia's ally Italy during the war, the Prussian Navy saw relatively little action; the only major operations were conducted in the North Sea, under the command of KzS Reinhold von Werner.

On 17 July 1867, Jachmann attended the fleet review held in Spithead, Britain in honor of the Ottoman Sultan Abdülaziz. On 22 August, he became of the director of the Ministry for the Navy, serving under Roon. Jachmann and Roon were good friends, which led to an effective partnership between the two. Jachmann presented his fleet plan in October that year, as part of Roon's overall military budget. The plan projected a ten-year construction program for sixteen ironclad warships, twenty corvettes, and eight avisos. Jachmann included the large number of corvettes to bring pro-colonialist factions to support the plan, though he was himself ambivalent to colonial aspirations. The Reichstag approved Roon's budget without objection. Jachmann was promoted to Vizeadmiral (VAdm—Vice Admiral) on 22 March 1868; he was the first man to hold that rank in the Prussian Navy. By mid-1869, the ironclads that the navy had begun to acquire under Jachmann's direction had started to enter service, permitting the formation of an ironclad squadron.

At the start of the Franco-Prussian War in July 1870, Jachmann left Berlin to take command of the ironclad squadron based in Wilhelmshaven. At the time, Jachmann had under his control the ironclads König Wilhelm, Friedrich Carl, Kronprinz, and Arminius. Work had not yet been completed on the fortifications outside Kiel and Wilhelmshaven; Jachmann ordered the acquisition of naval mines, a technology then still in its infancy, to help defend the German coast. The French Northern Squadron had arrived off the North Sea coast to blockade Germany's ports. He sortied with the fleet in late August, but located no French warships. König Wilhelm and Friedrich Carl thereafter developed engine problems, preventing Jachmann from taking further offensive actions, for which he was publicly criticized. For its part, the French blockade was poorly planned and achieved little of significance. By 11 September, all four of his ships were again operational, but by that time the French fleet had abandoned the blockade. Owing to the ineffectiveness of the ironclad fleet, none of its officers were decorated after the war.

=== Later career ===
With the war over, Jachmann returned to Berlin to several projects, including organizing a North Sea naval station and conducting an evaluation of the naval mines used during the war. He also oversaw the rapid expansion of the base at Wilhelmshaven and the establishment of the Imperial Naval Academy at Kiel. The two Kaiser-class ironclads were ordered from British shipyards in the anticipation that France would launch a war of revenge in the near future. Jachmann came under intense criticism in the press and the Reichstag for the orders, since they had not been given to German shipyards, though at that time German shipbuilders were not sufficiently developed to build vessels of that size quickly.

In 1872, the navy command was reorganized as the Imperial Admiralty. As the highest ranking naval officer, Jachmann expected to be given the role as the Chief of the Imperial Admiralty, but General Albrecht von Stosch received the position instead. Jachmann had not proved himself an effective administrator in the 1860s, nor had he impressed Wilhelm I with his handling of the fleet during the Franco-Prussian War. Instead, he remained the commander of the active naval forces, and was given a spot on the Admiralty board, though Stosch never actually convened the board while Jachmann was in the navy. Following the death of Prince Adalbert in June 1873 and the retirement of Roon the following October, Jachmann lost his most powerful friends, and Stosch largely ignored him. The fact that Jachmann came from a middle-class background and had no formal higher education served to isolate him in the officer corps Stosch sought to create, which was modeled on the aristocratic army officer corps. Jachmann requested retirement in February 1874; he was awarded the Order of the Red Eagle, 1st Class with Swords, on 17 February and thereafter left the service. Stosch then purged numerous other senior officers with similar backgrounds.

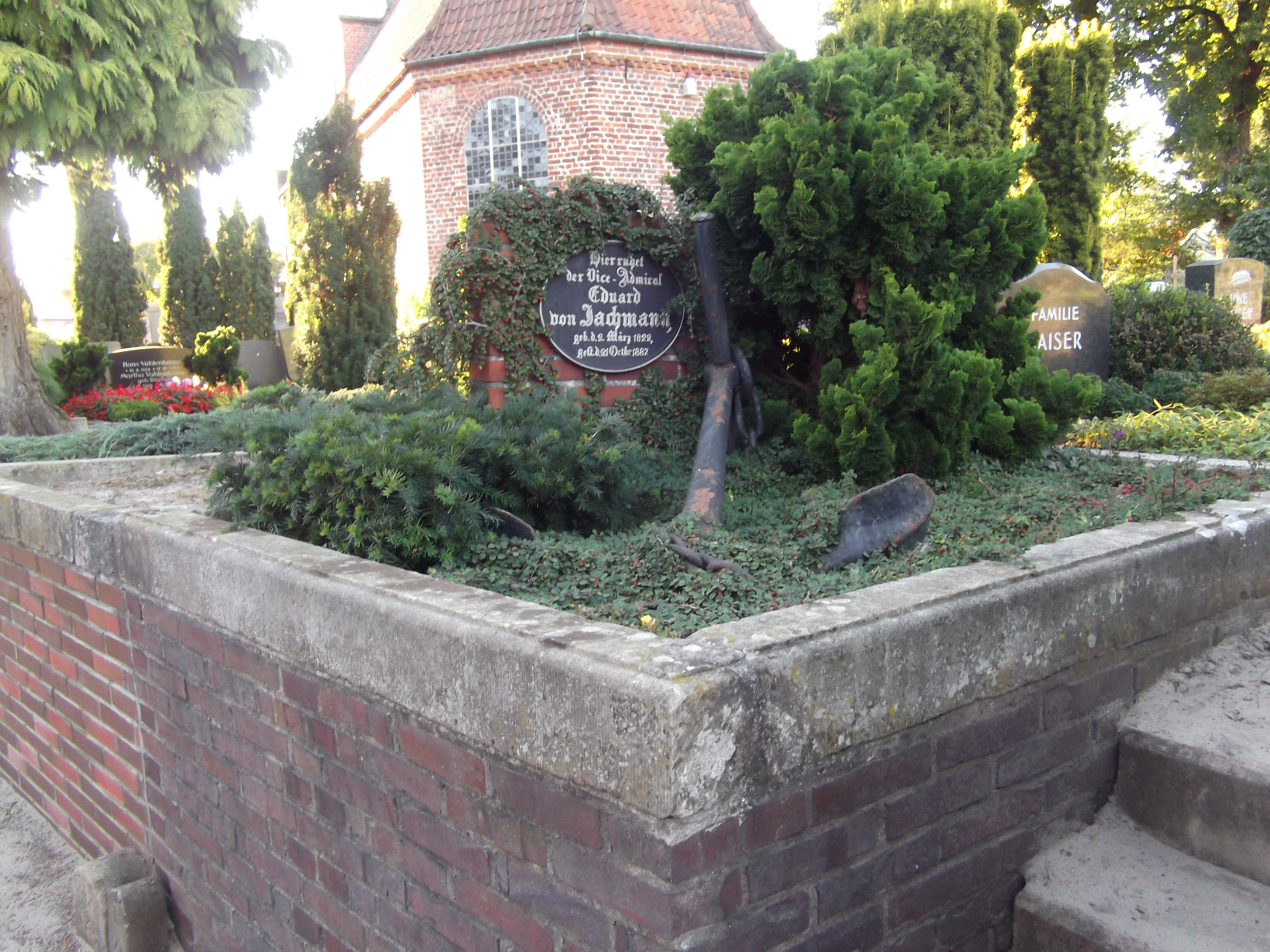
Jachmann's grave in Oldenburg

In May 1878, the new ironclad Grosser Kurfürst was accidentally rammed and sunk by König Wilhelm. Jachmann, still bitter at being passed over in favor of Stosch, anonymously published an article in Deutsche Revue severely criticizing Stosch's training policies, which he alleged favored military discipline and theory over practical seamanship. Jachmann was appointed a member of the court martial that investigated the accident and the role of Carl Ferdinand Batsch—the captain of König Wilhelm and Stosch's protege. Jachmann was at that time not known to be the author of the article, and he did not recuse himself. The court ruled against Batsch but did not issue a punishment. Batsch appealed to Stosch, arguing that Jachmann and the also retired VAdm Eduard Klatt had not been impartial judges. Kaiser Wilhelm I agreed to appoint a second court martial that did not include either man.

Jachmann retired to Oldenburg with his family, which included his wife Anna (whom he had married in 1852 in Trutenau near Königsberg), his daughter, and three sons. One of his sons, Siegfried von Jachmann, went on to serve in the Imperial Navy and reached the rank of Konteradmiral. Eduard appeared in public one last time on 18 May 1885, after Wilhelm I called on him to give the christening speech for the new corvette Arcona in Danzig. Jachmann died in Oldenburg on 21 October 1887.
