= SMS Grille =

Aviso of the Prussian and German Imperial Navy

- Grille in her original configuration

Class overview
- Operators: Prussian Navy; Imperial German Navy
- Preceded by: Nix class
- Succeeded by: SMS Loreley
- Completed: 1
- Retired: 1

History

Prussia
- Name: Grille
- Builder: Chantiers et Ateliers Augustin Normand
- Laid down: 1856
- Launched: 9 September 1857
- Commissioned: 3 June 1858
- Decommissioned: 17 December 1918
- Stricken: 7 January 1920
- Fate: Broken up

General characteristics (Note: Figures are in the ship's original configuration)
- Class & type: Unique aviso
- Displacement: Design: 350 t (340 long tons); Full load: 491 t (483 long tons)
- Length: 56.86 m (186 ft 7 in) o/a
- Beam: 7.38 m (24 ft 3 in)
- Draft: 2.84 m (9 ft 4 in)
- Installed power: 2 × Scotch marine boilers; 700 PS (690 ihp)
- Propulsion: 1 × marine steam engine; 1 × screw propeller
- Sail plan: Schooner
- Speed: 13 kn (24 km/h; 15 mph)
- Complement: 5 officers; 65 enlisted men
- Armament: 2 × 12-pound guns

SMS Grille was an aviso of the Prussian Navy built in France in the mid-1850s as part of a naval expansion program directed by Prince Adalbert of Prussia, who saw the need for a stronger fleet. She was authorized in 1855 in the aftermath of the First Schleswig War, which had demonstrated the weakness of the Prussian fleet. Grille was the first screw propeller-driven steamship to be built for Prussia; all earlier steam-powered vessels had been paddle steamers.

Initially operated without armament, she received a battery of two guns in 1864 during the Second Schleswig War; during that conflict, she participated in three minor skirmishes with the Danish blockade squadron in the Baltic Sea. She was disarmed after the war for use as a royal yacht, frequently carrying Crown Prince Friedrich and his family on cruises abroad, including on a trip to represent the North German Confederation at the opening of the Suez Canal in 1869. Grille was rearmed and saw action again in 1870 during the Franco-Prussian War, briefly skirmishing with a French squadron and in the process disrupting their planned attack on Swinemünde.

She returned to yacht duties after the war before being replaced by the new yacht Hohenzollern in 1879. Grille was reclassified as an aviso, serving with the main fleet through the 1880s. Later in the decade, she took on additional roles, including as a survey vessel and as a training ship. The 1890s passed largely uneventfully for Grille, and beginning in 1902, she began to serve as a headquarters ship and a tender for the fleet. She remained in service through July 1914, when she was decommissioned weeks before the outbreak of World War I. In 1915, she was reactivated to serve as a tender for the training cruiser Freya, a role she filled until the end of the war. Decommissioned in December 1918, she was struck from the naval register in January 1920 and later broken up for scrap. With an active career that spanned sixty-two years, she was the longest-serving vessel in the Prussian and later German fleet.

== Design ==
The Prussian Navy had been a chronically neglected force until the late 1840s, when a combination of public pressure over the navy's inability to protect German merchant shipping during the First Schleswig War against Denmark and advocacy from Prince Adalbert of Prussia for a stronger fleet led to a new shipbuilding program. In 1850, the paddle steamers Danzig, Nix, and Salamander were authorized. The frigate Gefion and the paddle steamer Barbarossa were acquired when the Reichsflotte (Imperial Fleet) collapsed in 1852, and Adalbert continued to push for expansion of the fleet into the mid-1850s. In 1855, he secured royal approval for a new fleet plan. Grille was designed in 1856 by her builder, Chantiers et Ateliers Augustin Normand, of Le Havre, France; her name was chosen by King Friedrich Wilhelm IV, after the play Die Grille (The Cricket) by Charlotte Birch-Pfeiffer. She was the first steamship of the Prussian Navy to incorporate a screw propeller rather than the paddle wheels of earlier vessels.

=== General characteristics ===
Grille was 52.5 m (172 ft 3 in) long at the waterline and 56.86 m (186 ft 7 in) long overall. She had a beam of 7.38 m (24 ft 3 in) and a draft of 2.84 m (9 ft 4 in) forward and 3.2 m (10 ft 6 in) aft. As designed, she displaced 350 t (340 long tons) and at full load, displacement increased to 491 t (483 long tons). The hull was carvel built and constructed with transverse mahogany frames, though the rear and side walls of the stokeholds were iron. It was divided into three watertight compartments and was sheathed in copper to protect it from biofouling. Grille had a flush deck and a minimal superstructure, featuring a small deck house forward and a larger one aft. During a refit in 1889, the forward deck house was removed and a smaller structure was erected further aft, behind the fore mast.

The ship's crew initially consisted of five officers and sixty-five enlisted men; this later increased to six and seventy-two, respectively, and finally seven officers and sixty-eight enlisted. The vessel carried four smaller boats: two yawls and two dinghies. Grille was a good sea boat; it had a gentle motion, though it rolled quickly. She was very maneuverable and maintained her speed in a head sea or in turns. Steering was controlled by a single rudder. Between 1880 and 1902, she carried a searchlight atop the aft deck house.

=== Machinery ===
Grille was propelled by a horizontal, single-expansion, 2-cylinder marine steam engine that was manufactured by J. Penn & Sons of London; the engine drove a single 3-bladed screw propeller that was 2.74 m (9 ft 0 in) in diameter. Steam was provided by two coal-fired Scotch marine boilers, also built by J. Penn & Sons. The boilers were ducted into a single funnel located amidships. The machinery was rated at 700 metric horsepower (690 ihp) for a top speed of 13 knots (24 km/h; 15 mph); on speed trials, she reached 738 metric horsepower (728 ihp) for 13.2 knots (24.4 km/h; 15.2 mph). To supplement the steam engine, she was fitted with a three-masted schooner rig that had a total sail area of 436 m^{2} (4,690 sq ft). Fuel storage and cruising range figures for her original power plant have not survived.

In 1886, the original engine was replaced with a horizontal, 2-cylinder double-expansion steam engine manufactured by AG Vulcan, Stettin, along with new coal-fired fire-tube boilers also built by AG Vulcan. A shorter funnel, moved further forward, replaced the original one. The new machinery increased her maximum power to 760 metric horsepower (750 ihp) and her top speed to 14.4 knots (26.7 km/h; 16.6 mph). After this refit, she was capable of storing 65 t (64 long tons) of coal; at a speed of 7 knots (13 km/h; 8.1 mph), the ship had a cruising radius of 3,230 nautical miles (5,980 km; 3,720 mi). When cruising at 10 knots (19 km/h; 12 mph), her range fell to 2,160 nmi (4,000 km; 2,490 mi). She was modernized again in 1897–1898, receiving new boilers from Borsig. Her sailing rig was cut down to auxiliary sails only. At various points in her career, she received electric generators that produced 2.3 to 5 kW (3.1 to 6.7 hp).

=== Armament ===
The ship initially carried no armament, but following the outbreak of the Second Schleswig War in 1864, she had two long-barreled 12-pound guns installed. She was disarmed after the war, only to have the guns reinstalled during the Franco-Prussian War in 1870–1871. Grille was once again disarmed after the war, remaining so until 1879. At that time, she received one 12.5 cm (4.9 in) 23-caliber (cal.) breechloading hoop gun that was supplied with 140 shells. It had a range of 5,200 m (17,100 ft). In addition, she received a pair of 8 cm (3.1 in) 23-cal. guns. Three 37 mm (1.5 in) Hotchkiss revolving cannon were added in 1882, with three more being installed in 1898; the larger guns were removed at this time. In her final configuration, from around 1900 or 1901, she carried just two of the Hotchkiss guns.

== Service history ==
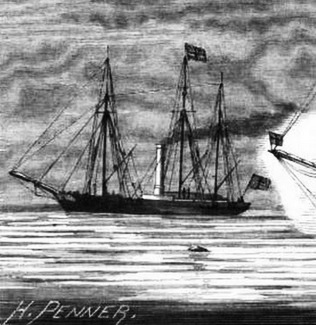
Illustration of Grille early in her career

=== Early career ===
Grille was laid down in 1856 and was launched on 9 September 1857. The French emperor, Napoleon III, sent Prince Jérôme Bonaparte to the launching ceremony to honor King Friedrich Wilhlem IV. The training ship Hela carried the new crew to Le Havre while fitting-out work was being completed. Grille was commissioned on 3 June 1858. The ship steamed to the Baltic Sea to her home port at Dänholm to begin sea trials that lasted until 22 October when she was decommissioned.

The ship was recommissioned in early May 1859 due to increased tensions between Denmark and Prussia over the disputed ownership of Schleswig and Holstein, though the war scare passed quickly. Her commander during this period, from May to June, was Leutnant zur See (LzS—Lieutenant at Sea) Heinrich Köhler, and Grille only conducted a tour of the Prussian coast with Prince Adalbert aboard before being decommissioned. She was briefly reactivated a second time that year, from August to October; apart from her commander having been Kapitänleutnant (KL—Lieutenant Captain) Ludwig von Henk, nothing is known about this period in commission. The ship was recommissioned in June 1860, commanded by Korvettenkapitän (KK—Corvette Captain) Hans Kuhn, with the intention to send the vessel on a cruise in the Mediterranean Sea, but the ship was still without armament and the plan was abandoned. Kuhn left the ship in August, being replaced by LzS Hermann Przewisinski, though the ship was once again decommissioned in October. She remained out of service for the next two years and on 16 January 1862, she was re-designated as a royal yacht. Grille was recommissioned under the command of LzS Franz Kinderling in July 1863 for use by Crown Prince Friedrich and his family to make short trips.

=== Second Schleswig War ===
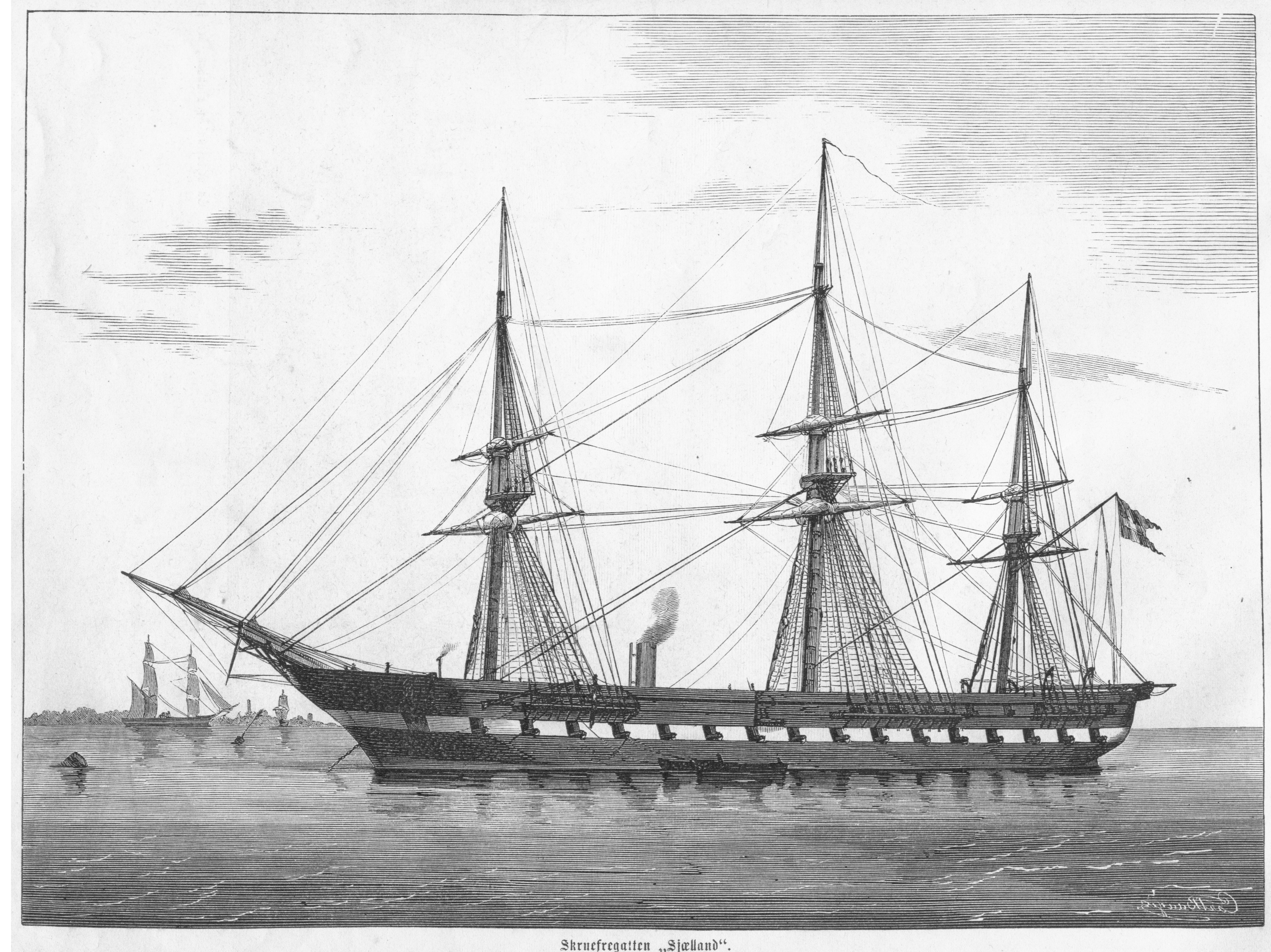
The Danish screw frigate Sjælland that engaged Grille on 14 April

With tensions again on the rise between Prussia and Denmark by the end of the year, Grille was allocated as the flagship for Prince Adalbert, the commander of the Prussian fleet. Following the outbreak of war in February 1864, she was activated for this purpose on 10 March, by which time a pair of 12-pound guns had been fitted. Grille remained in port when Eduard von Jachmann took several vessels to sea to attack the Danish blockade, resulting in the Battle of Jasmund in March. Adalbert came aboard the vessel on 29 March at Stralsund, and on 6 April, he observed training exercises with the gunboats in the Bay of Greifswald. Grille sortied on 14 April with Adalbert aboard for a sweep into the Bay of Pomerania that resulted in an encounter with the Danish ship of the line Skjold and the steam frigate Sjælland. Grille opened fire at long range, leading to an indecisive two-and-a-half-hour battle in which Grille easily outran the more powerful Danish vessels. She fled back to Swinemünde, where the gunboats of the 1st Flotilla and Jachmann's squadron covered her approach. As it was nearing dark, the Danish commander, Admiral Edvard van Dockum, chose to break off the pursuit.

Grille, now accompanied by the gunboats of the Reserve Division, sortied again on 24 April. For this operation, Grille served as the flagship of now Kapitän zur See (Captain at Sea) Kuhn, who was the commander of the gunboat division. Off Hiddensee, the ships encountered the Danish steam frigate Tordenskjold, resulting in a 90-minute battle. Grille initially remained outside the range of the Danish guns, but after she hit Tordenskjold''s rigging several times, the Danish frigate closed the distance, prompting the Prussian vessels to break off the engagement and return to port. Grille embarked on another sweep off Hiddensee two days later, but she encountered the combined Danish squadron: Skjold, Sjælland, Tordenskjold, and the armed schooner Absalon, prompting the Prussians to withdraw without engaging. She conducted one last operation on 6 May under Jachmann's direction; in company with the screw corvette Nymphe, I Flotilla, and the Reserve Division, Grille sortied to attack the blockade squadron, but as Sjælland and the ironclad warship Dannebrog arrived on the scene, Jachmann aborted the operation and returned to port. The armistice that ended the war took effect six days later. King Wilhelm I and Crown Prince Friedrich boarded the ship for a naval review in the mouth of the Oder river on 6 June.

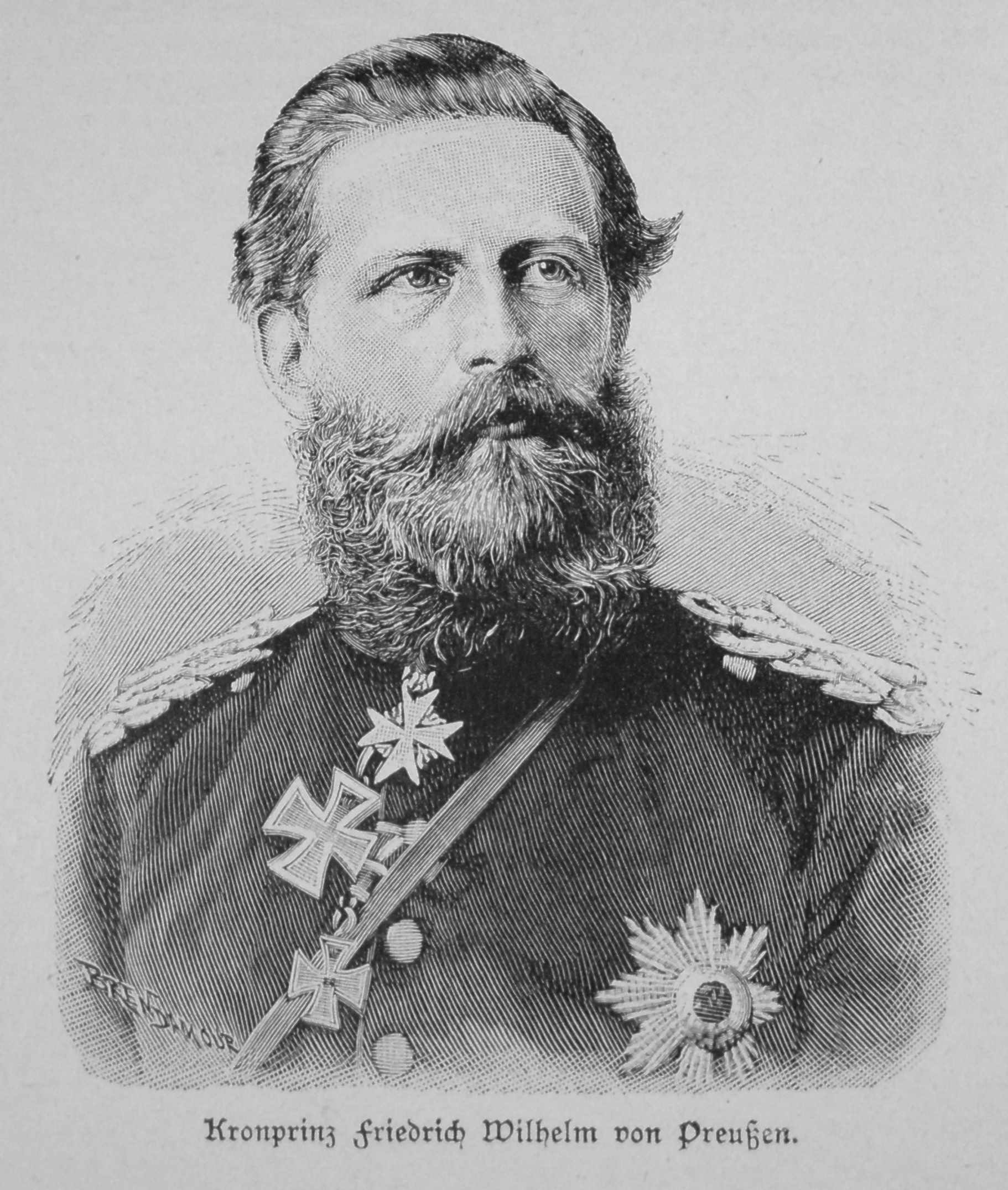
Crown Prince Friedrich, a frequent passenger aboard Grille

With the war over, Grille joined the main Prussian squadron that visited a number of ports in the newly-acquired provinces in the western Baltic in August. While cruising in the Trave, she accidentally ran aground on 24 August. The gunboats Comet and Cyclop assisted the stranded aviso, which was ultimately re-floated after considerable lightening of the ship. Grille proceeded to the Schweffel & Howaldt shipyard in Kiel for repairs before resuming the tour with the Prussian squadron, which concluded on 18 September in Kiel. Prince Adalbert held another naval review there in October; he observed the fleet from Grille. The aviso thereafter returned to Dänholm on 1 December, where she was decommissioned and disarmed to return to yacht duties.

=== Royal yacht ===
Grille was recommissioned on 1 May 1865 to take Crown Prince Friedrich and his family on a cruise; the ship's captain from June to September that year was KL Archibald MacLean. She remained out of service in 1866, but was reactivated for another cruise by the Crown Prince's family the next year, once again under the command of now KK Przewisinski. She went to Danzig in 1868 for an overhaul that focused largely on repairs to her boilers. The next year, Grille was reactivated to take part in ceremonies on 17 June marking the opening of the naval base at Wilhelmshaven, which had just been completed. On 30 August, she joined the Prussian ironclad squadron—the first time the unit had been activated—for exercises in Kiel. Grille received orders in mid-September to join a squadron that consisted of the steam frigates Hertha, Arcona, and Elisabeth and the gunboat Delphin to attend the opening ceremonies of the Suez Canal in Ottoman Egypt at the invitation of Sultan Abdülaziz of the Ottoman Empire.

After stopping in Piraeus, Greece on 22 October, Grille embarked Prince Friedrich, who was to represent the North German Confederation at the ceremonies. The ships traveled first to the Ottoman capital, Constantinople, where Friedrich met with Abdülaziz from 24 to 29 October. On the way to the canal, Grille and the other ships stopped in Jaffa and Beirut; after arriving off Port Said, the ships were delayed by a lack of harbor pilots until 15 November. Grille's captain, KK Ratzeburg, was to have secured the pilots in advance of the ships' arrival, but he failed to do so. Instead, the British admiral directed the vessels to a safe anchorage for the night. For his failure to carry out his responsibility, Ratzeburg was confined to his quarters for twenty-four hours. The Crown Prince passed through the canal aboard Grille as part of the ceremony on 20 November. The squadron left Port Said on 1 December, proceeding to Alexandria, where they waited for Friedrich to return from an expedition to the Nile. Grille left on 9 December, Friedrich having boarded Elisabeth for the voyage to Italy. Grille remained in Naples until 29 January 1870, thereafter resuming the voyage home; while on the way, she stopped in Britain and was visited by Prince Edward and Princess Alexandra. The ship finally arrived in Kiel on 26 April and proceeded to Dänholm where she was decommissioned on 5 May.

=== Franco-Prussian War ===
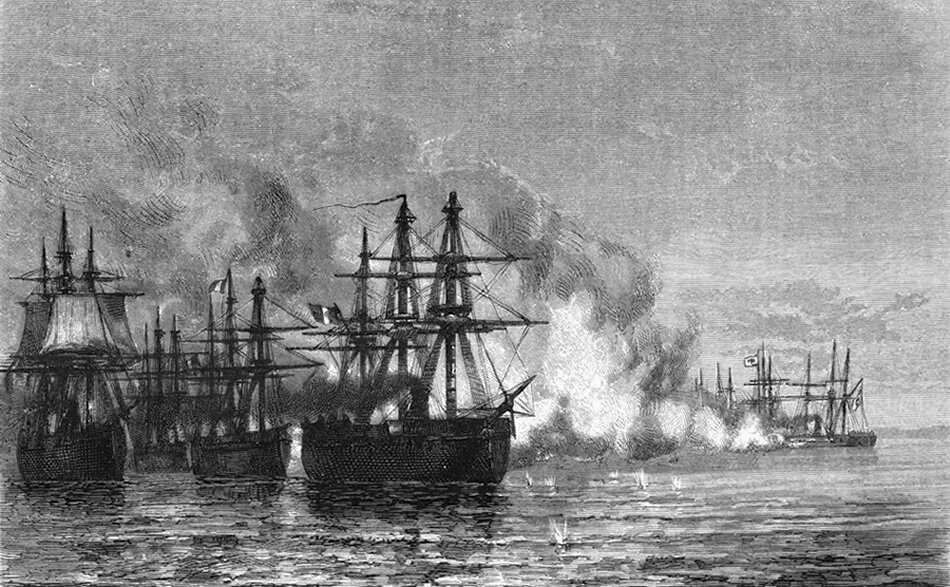
Grille (right distance) engaging the French squadron (left foreground)

Following the outbreak of the Franco-Prussian War on 19 July 1870, Grille was reactivated on the 24th to serve as the flagship of the gunboat Flotilla Division that was stationed in Stralsund. The unit was placed under the command of KK Franz von Waldersee. The French squadron that had begun a blockade of the Baltic coast used the bay at Køge on the island of Sjælland as their base. Waldersee sortied with Grille and three gunboats on 17 July to attack the French squadron; he encountered three frigates and an aviso. The inconclusive action that followed ended when Grille entered water too shallow for the French to continue their pursuit. Though neither side inflicted damage on the other, Waldersee's attack had disrupted French plans for an attack on Swinemünde, for which he was later awarded the Iron Cross. On 10 September, Grille was assigned to the command of Konteradmiral (Rear Admiral) Eduard Heldt, the commander of naval forces in the Baltic. Grille conducted a reconnaissance sweep around Bornholm and into the Little Belt, which revealed that the French had already left the Baltic.

Grille, Elisabeth, and some gunboats passed through the Kattegat and Skagerrak into the North Sea on 6 October, arriving in Wilhelmshaven three days later without having encountered any French warships. For the rest of the year, Grille was used to patrol the German Bight; she met French vessels at sea only once, on 12 October, though they did not engage each other. By mid-December, the rivers in the area had begun to ice over, forcing Grille to anchor at the naval depot at Geestemünde for the winter. By the time the winter ice had receded in March 1871, the war had already ended, so Grille returned to the Baltic in company with Elisabeth and the ironclad turret ship Arminius. After arriving in Kiel, she was decommissioned on 17 April.

=== 1870s ===
After recommissioning on 2 July 1872, Grille returned to service as the royal yacht for the Crown Prince and his family for a summer cruise through August. She was used for a tour of the coasts of Pomerania, Mecklenburg, and Schleswig-Holstein for the coast defense commission beginning on 4 September. The ship was then decommissioned for the winter and returned to service in July 1873. She again embarked Prince Friedrich on 3 May, this time to carry him to Christiana, Norway for the coronation ceremony for Oscar II, the king of Sweden and Norway. Two days later, she rendezvoused with the German training squadron and the ships entered Christiana for the ceremonies. Grille departed the port on 9 May and steamed to Malmö, where she embarked Prince Friedrich on 19 May to return him to Kiel on the 22nd. While on the way back, Friedrich accepted an invitation from Christian IX of Denmark to visit the country; this was the first time a member of the Prussian House of Hohenzollern had visited Denmark since the Second Schleswig War.

The navy did not initially plan to recommission Grille during 1874, but after the gunboat Albatross was deployed to Spanish waters, the navy hastily commissioned Grille to take her place in the annual fleet maneuvers held in September. On 19 September, she hosted now-Kaiser Wilhelm I for a review of the training squadron and the next day, she was present for the launching ceremony of the new ironclad Friedrich der Grosse. Grille returned to yacht duties for Prince Friedrich in 1875, and in September that year, Wilhelm I and several Bundesfürsten (federal princes) came aboard for another fleet review. She remained out of commission for 1876 and 1877, but was recommissioned the next year. From 10 to 17 May, she hosted several members from the Reichstag and the Bundesrat (Federal Council) during the launching ceremonies for the ironclad Bayern, followed by torpedo demonstrations off Friedrichsort. The next year, she was reclassified as an aviso and rearmed, her place as imperial yacht having been taken by Hohenzollern. She served with the training squadron from 5 to 22 May, and in late June, she assisted Friedrich der Grosse and two tugboats to tow a floating dry dock from Kiel to Swinemünde. Another fleet review for the Kaiser was held from 10 to 15 September in Danzig Bay and Grille was decommissioned on 25 September.

=== 1880s ===
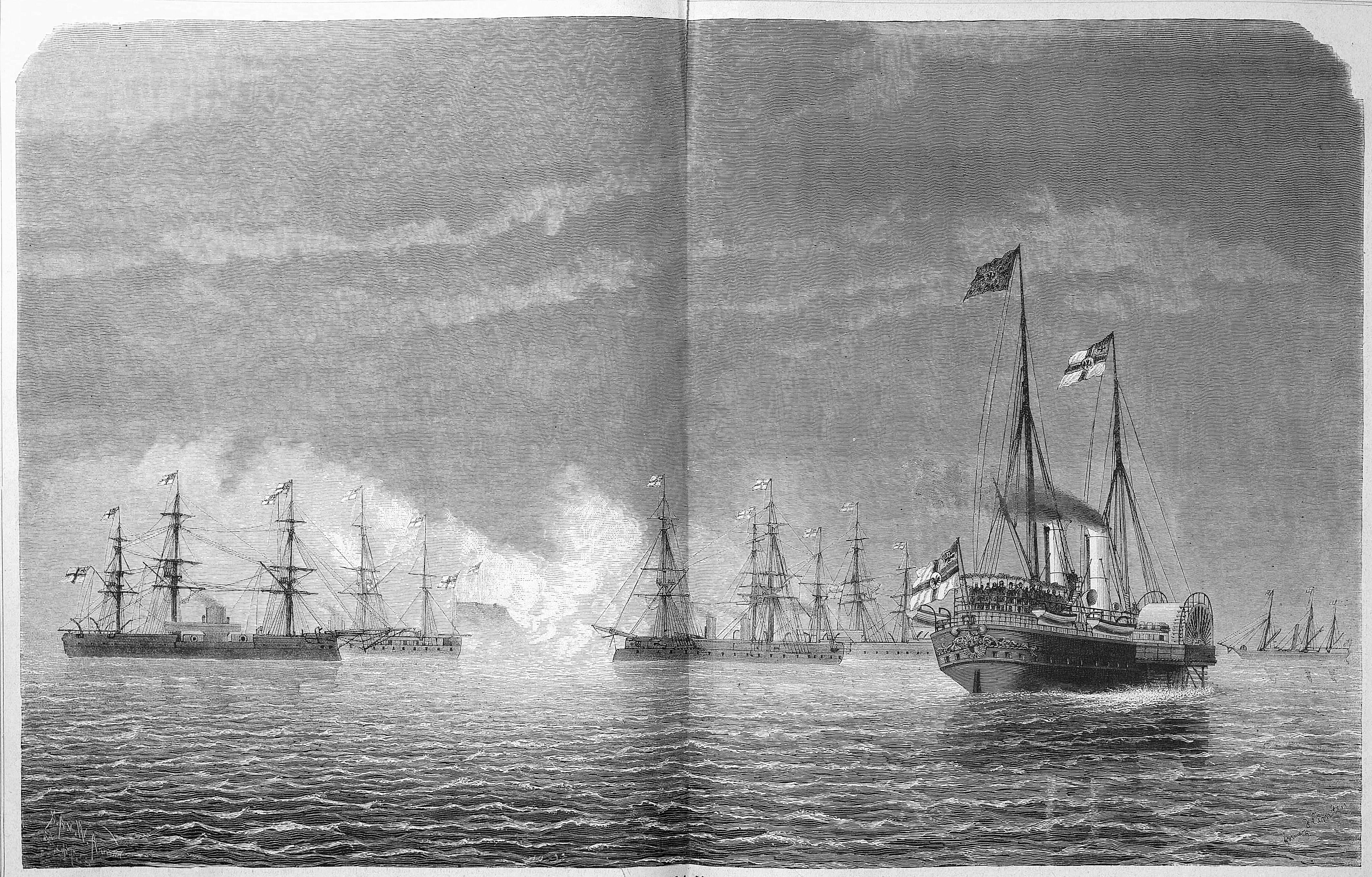
Illustration of the fleet conducting maneuvers; Grille is at right in the background, along with several ironclads and the Kaiser's yacht Hohenzollern (foreground)

Grille returned to service in early 1880 and she joined the training squadron for exercises from 3 to 25 May with Prince Friedrich aboard. The ship was present for the launching of the ironclad Baden on 28 July. Grille was used in the first tests of a searchlight to spot and defend against torpedo boats attacking at night. The next year, she took part in the May squadron maneuvers, and in July, she hosted Prince Wilhelm during a visit by a British squadron. In September, she hosted the Kaiser during a meeting with Czar Alexander III of Russia. The next two years followed a similar pattern of mid-year exercises with the fleet; from May to August 1882, KK Carl Barandon served as the ship's commander, followed by KL Otto Flichtenhöfer from August to September. In 1883 she fired a shot across the bow of a Norwegian merchant ship that failed to fly a flag in accordance with international law. Grille served with the fleet from 22 April to 5 September 1884 under the command of KL Oscar von Schuckmann, and during the annual fleet maneuvers at the end of that period, she served as the flagship of the armored gunboat division, commanded by KzS Karl August Deinhard.

In 1885, Grille was used for surveying work off the coast of Mecklenburg, the bay at Aarøsund, and around Rügen, covering a distance of some 104 nautical miles (193 km; 120 mi). The ship was thoroughly overhauled at the Kaiserliche Werft (Imperial Shipyard) in Danzig in 1886. She received significant improvements, including a new propulsion system and new planking for her decks. The work was completed in late 1888, and on 1 January 1889 she was assigned to the recently created Reserve Division of the Baltic Sea. On 2 May, she began a series of cruises along the coast with naval officers aboard to familiarize them with various locations along Germany's Baltic coast. She also took part in the training maneuvers with the rest of the fleet, including participating in a preparatory cruise in the western Baltic and into the Elbe river before the annual fleet exercises in September.

=== 1890s–1920 ===
Grille continued the same activities in the early 1890s; in 1890, under the command of KK Georg Sarnow, she hosted government officials for the ceremonial transfer of Helgoland from Britain to Germany, and in 1891, she visited ports in Scotland with KL Ernst Gülich as her captain. She was present for the launching of the new Hohenzollern in June 1892; KL Carl Derzewski served as her commander from April to September that year. The years 1893 and 1894 passed uneventfully in the same pattern as previous years; KK Max von Basse was her commander in 1894. She was then decommissioned in Danzig for another overhaul, and in June 1895 she was present for the opening ceremonies of the Kaiser Wilhelm Canal. She embarked Kaiserin (Empress) Augusta during the Kiel Week sailing regatta in 1896, while under the command of KL Karl Dick. The next year followed a similar pattern, with no incidents of note. She was reconstructed again in late 1898 at the Kaiserliche Werft in Kiel, that included a reduction in her rigging and the removal of her deck house. The next year, the coastal cruises began to include members of the newly created Admiralstab (Admiralty Staff). From May to September 1899, KK Wilhelm Becker served as her commander.

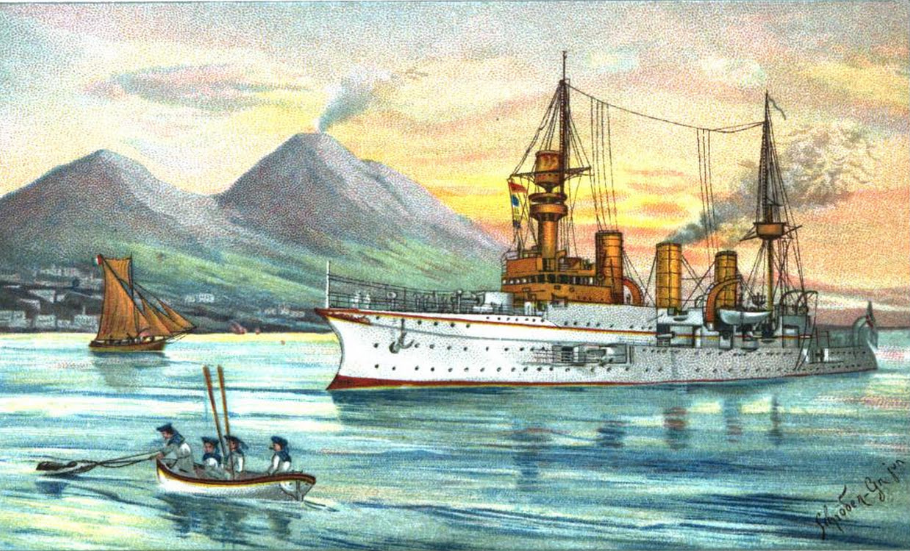
The protected cruiser Freya, the vessel for which Grille ended her career as a tender

Grille's coastal cruises were interrupted on 2 September 1902 by leaking boiler tubes that necessitated repairs. Once those were completed, she joined I Squadron as the aviso and headquarters ship, serving in those roles until the end of April 1903. She was also used as a fleet tender, and for the first time she remained in commission through the winter of 1903–1904. Periodic maintenance was carried out in Danzig from 28 November 1904 to 5 March 1905, thereafter serving as a tender and headquarters vessel. For much of this period, she was stationed in Kiel. Another overhaul followed from 4 March to 10 April 1906 in Danzig; she thereafter resumed her normal routine of cruises and was assigned to the Training Inspectorate later that year. She became the headquarters ship for the fleet flagship, Deutschland, beginning on 21 September. She returned to Danzig on 14 November, where she was decommissioned on 26 March 1907 for repairs to her boilers. Grille resumed coastal cruises in 1908, and on 3 June the crew held a celebration of the ship's fiftieth year in service; Kaiser Wilhelm II issued a cabinet order to mark the occasion.

The ship carried out the same routine of training cruises and tender and headquarters duties from 1909 to 1913, with no events of note during that period. She was stationed at the Marinestation der Nordsee (North Sea Naval Station) at the time, and she was decommissioned toward the end of every year in Wilhelmshaven. She was recommissioned on 1 April 1914, the last time she would do so in peacetime; she was decommissioned on 19 July during the July Crisis that resulted in World War I. Grille was reactivated on 10 July 1915 for use as a tender for the training ship Freya, based at the Mürwik Naval School, and served in that role for the duration of the war before being decommissioned for the last time on 17 December 1918. She was struck from the naval register 7 January 1920; by that time, she had been in service for nearly sixty-two years, the longest career of any vessel in the Imperial fleet. She was thereafter sold for scrap and was broken up in Hamburg.
