= Heinrich von Brandt =

- Born: February 8, 1789
- Died: January 23, 1868 (aged 78); Berlin, Kingdom of Prussia
- Military career
- Allegiance: Kingdom of Prussia
- Branch: Prussian Army

Heinrich von Brandt (2 August 1789, in Łąkie near Poznań – 23 January 1868, in Berlin) was a Prussian general and military author.

== Biography ==
=== Military career ===
He studied law in Berlin. In 1807, he joined the army. The Peace of Tilsit made him a subject of the Grand Duchy of Warsaw, and as such he fought in the War of the Fifth Coalition in Spain and Napoleon's invasion of Russia. At the Battle of Leipzig, he was wounded and captured by the Russians, who forced him into the Polish army. In 1816, he entered the Prussian army and became a member of the general staff. He took part in the Polish revolts of 1831 and 1848, the latter of which he helped to suppress. He retired from the army in 1857 with the rank of general of infantry.

=== Political service ===
He was elected a member of the Prussian Upper Chamber in 1849 and of the Erfurt Parliament in 1850.

== Family ==
His son, Max von Brandt, was a noted German diplomat.

== Works ==
Von Brandt is most notable for his writings, chief of which are:

- Geschichte des Kriegswesens (Berlin, 1830–35)
- Grundzüge der Taktik der drei Waffen (1883)
- Der kleine Krieg (2d ed, 1850)
- In the Legions of Napoleon: The Memoirs of a Polish Officer in Spain and Russia, 1808-1813 (London, 1999)
