= SMS Loreley (1859) =

Aviso of the Prussian and German Imperial Navy

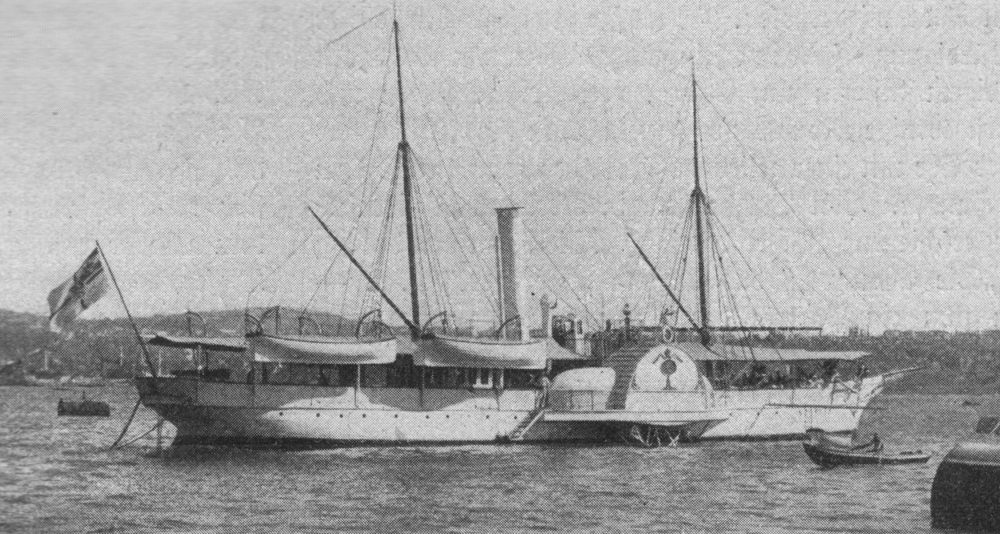
- Loreley in her later configuration

Class overview
- Operators: Prussian Navy; Imperial German Navy
- Preceded by: SMS Grille
- Succeeded by: SMS Falke
- Completed: 1
- Retired: 1

History
- Name: Loreley
- Builder: Königliche Werft, Danzig
- Laid down: 1 February 1858
- Launched: 20 May 1859
- Commissioned: 28 September 1859
- Decommissioned: 7 September 1896
- Stricken: 10 August 1896
- Fate: Unknown

General characteristics
- Type: Aviso
- Displacement: Design: 430 t (420 long tons); Full load: 470 t (460 long tons)
- Length: 43.34 m (142 ft 2 in) lwl; 47.08 m (154 ft 6 in) loa
- Beam: 6.6 m (21 ft 8 in)
- Draft: 2.5 m (8 ft 2 in)
- Installed power: 1 × boiler; 350 PS (345 ihp)
- Propulsion: 1 × marine steam engine; 2 × paddle wheels
- Speed: 10.5 kn (19.4 km/h; 12.1 mph)
- Complement: 4 officers; 61 enlisted men
- Armament: 2 × 12-pounder guns

SMS Loreley was an aviso of the Prussian Navy built in the late 1850s. Built as a paddle steamer, since the Prussian naval command was not convinced of the reliability of screw propellers, she was the first Prussian warship to be fitted with a domestically-produced marine steam engine. The ship carried a light armament of two 12-pound guns and had a top speed of 10.5 knots (19.4 km/h; 12.1 mph). Loreley was intended to serve as the flagship of the gunboat flotillas that formed the bulk of the Prussian fleet in the 1850s.

After entering service, the ship was sent to the Italian Peninsula in 1861 to protect Prussians and other German nationals during the Second Italian War of Independence, part of the unification of Italy. She thereafter went to Greece, the Ottoman Empire, and then to Romania before being recalled to Prussia in 1862. She served in her intended role during the Second Schleswig War, serving as the command ship for five flotillas of gunboats based in the Baltic Sea. She saw action against the Danish Navy during the war at the Battle of Jasmund, where she received a single hit that killed one man. After the war, she was decommissioned and saw little activity for the rest of the decade, by which time she was in poor condition.

Loreley was extensively rebuilt between 1869 and 1873, thereafter serving in the North Sea until 1879, when she was sent to the Ottoman Empire to serve as Germany's station ship in Constantinople. She remained there for nearly two decades to protect German interests during periods of unrest in the country. Worn out by 1896, she was struck from the naval register in August and sold in September. Her ultimate fate is unknown.

== Design ==
Following the sale of the two Nix-class avisos in 1855, the Prussian Navy had no smaller steam-driven warships; the aviso Grille, built the following year, was initially intended to serve as a royal yacht and carried no armament. The navy decided it needed a vessel that could serve as a flagship and scout for the small gunboats that formed the bulk of Prussia's small fleet. The Technical Department of the Admiralty drew up plans in 1857 for a paddle steamer that could serve in that role. At the time, naval designers had not settled on the use of screw propellers on warships, and the Prussian designers still had reservations about adopting the new technology. They also eschewed iron for the hull in favor of traditional wood planking.

=== General characteristics ===
Loreley was 43.34 m (142 ft 2 in) long at the waterline and 47.08 m (154 ft 6 in) long overall. She had a beam of 6.6 m (21 ft 8 in) and a draft of 2.5 m (8 ft 2 in) forward and 3.02 m (9.9 ft) aft. As designed, she displaced 430 t (420 long tons) and at full load, her displacement increased to 470 t (460 long tons). Her hull was constructed with transverse wooden frames and was carvel-built; to protect from biofouling, the wooden hull planks were sheathed in copper. The hull was divided into seven watertight compartments. Her freeboard amounted to 4.9 m (16 ft 1 in).

Loreley was thoroughly rebuilt between 1869 and 1873; the reconstruction was so extensive, she is sometimes considered a different vessel. Her original wooden hull was rebuilt with iron frames, though she retained the wooden outer planking, still sheathed in copper. Displacement fell slightly, to 395 t (389 long tons) as designed and 450 t (440 long tons) at full load. She was also shortened slightly, with a waterline length of 42.84 m (140 ft 7 in) and an overall length of 46.6 m (152 ft 11 in). Beam remained the same, but her draft increased slightly to 2.51 m (8 ft 3 in) forward and 3.05 m (10 ft) aft.

Steering was controlled with a single rudder; Loreley was a mediocre sea boat and she was difficult to turn. She lost little speed in a head sea, though a beam sea caused considerable loss of speed. The ship had a crew of four officers and sixty-one enlisted men, though the latter figure was later reduced to fifty-three after the reconstruction. She carried two small boats of unrecorded type.

=== Machinery ===
Loreley was propelled by a single oscillating, 2-cylinder marine steam engine manufactured by the machine shop operated by the Seehandlungsgesellschaft, the royal merchant shipping organization. This made her the first Prussian warship to be fitted with a domestically-produced engine, as all previous vessels, including those built in Prussia, used British propulsion systems. The engine drove a pair of paddle wheels, one on either side of the ship, that were 5.36 m (17 ft 7 in) in diameter and were fitted with twenty-four paddles per wheel. Steam for the engine was provided by a single coal-fired trunk boiler that was ducted into a single funnel just aft of the wheels. The boiler was built by AG Vulcan, Stettin. Her propulsion system was rated to produce 350 metric horsepower (345 ihp), for a top speed of 10.5 knots (19.4 km/h; 12.1 mph); steaming endurance figures have not survived for her original configuration. To supplement the steam engine, she was fitted as a gaff-rigged schooner, though they contributed little to her performance. Her sailing rig had a total area of 310 m^{2} (3,300 sq ft), though this was later reduced to 200 m^{2} (2,200 sq ft).

The ship initially retained her original propulsion system during her reconstruction, but in 1879, she received new boilers that were built by the Kaiserliche Werft (Imperial Shipyard) in Wilhelmshaven. As reconstructed, her top speed fell to 9.1 knots (16.9 km/h; 10.5 mph). She carried 34 t (33 long tons) of coal, which provided a cruising radius of 450 nautical miles (830 km; 520 mi) at a speed of 9 knots.

=== Armament ===
Loreley carried an initial armament of two long-barreled 12-pounder guns in individual carriages. These were supplied with a total of 240 shells. After emerging from her refit in 1873, she carried a single breechloading 12.5 cm (4.9 in) 23-caliber (cal.) hoop gun that was supplied with 142 shells. It had a range of 5,200 m (17,100 ft). In addition, she received a pair of 8 cm (3.1 in) 23-cal. breechloading guns with a total of 190 shells.

== Service history ==
The keel for Loreley was laid down at the Königliche Werft (Royal Shipyard) in Danzig on 1 February 1858. She was launched on 20 May 1859, and was christened for the Loreley rock formation on the Rhine at Sankt Goar. She was commissioned for sea trials on 28 September, with Leutnant zur See (LzS—Lieutenant at Sea) Heinrich Köhler as her first commander; the trials revealed that her engine was too weak to meet the design requirements, but no improvements were made. The ship entered active service in 1860; she was sent to the Mediterranean Sea to protect Prussian and German interests and evacuate civilians in the Italian Peninsula, then in the midst of the Second Italian War of Independence that led to the unification of Italy. The ship still had not received her intended armament, so she received a pair of guns that had been fitted to Preussischer Adler in 1848. Since Loreley would be incapable of carrying the number of passengers that would be required, the navy chartered the steamship SS Ida to accompany Loreley. The aviso's commander for the operation was Korvettenkapitän (KK—Corvette Captain) Hans Kuhn.

Loreley left Danzig on 31 July 1860 and Ida followed on 9 August; the two ships rendezvoused off Naples, then in the Kingdom of the Two Sicilies, on 31 August. Giuseppe Garibaldi's Expedition of the Thousand had forced King Francis II to flee to Gaeta, so Loreley embarked the Prussian and Austrian ambassadors, along with a pair of representatives from the Papal States, and carried them to Gaeta. She then returned to Naples, where she and Ida embarked civilians from the German states fleeing the fighting there. A senior Sicilian officer was also evacuated aboard Ida, which drew protests from the Kingdom of Sardinia. Loreley was sent first to Greece in October to show the flag in Piraeus, leaving Ida in Italian waters. From there, she directed to visit the Ottoman Empire and enter the Black Sea. Under the terms of the Treaty of Paris that had ended the Crimean War in 1856, Prussia and the other European Great Powers (excluding the Russian Empire) were permitted to station warships in the mouth of the Danube at Sulina. Loreley was the first Prussian warship to do so. She returned to the Ottoman capital, Constantinople, in mid-June 1861 to bring the Prussian ambassador to visit the new Sultan Abdülaziz. The ship's executive officer, LzS Otto Livonius, took command of the ship when Kuhn was recalled to Prussia to take command of the gunboat flotilla; Loreley then cruised to Mount Athos. She remained in the Mediterranean for another year, which passed uneventfully, before returning to Prussia, being decommissioned at Dänholm in August 1862.

=== Second Schleswig War ===
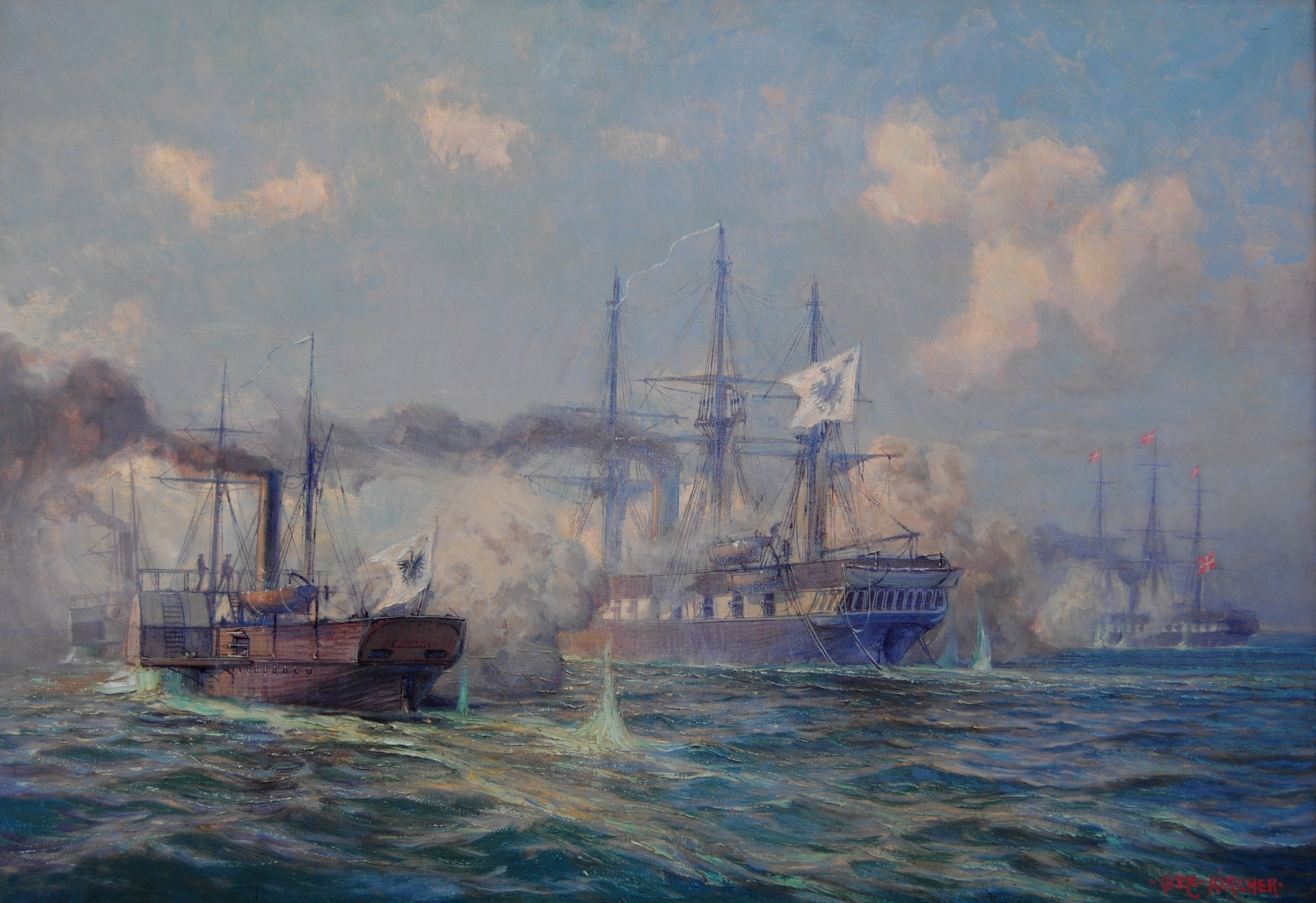
Loreley (left) and the corvette Nymphe engaging the Danish frigate Sjælland (right distance)

The Second Schleswig War began in February 1864 and Loreley was recommissioned on 21 February and stationed in Swinemünde as the flagship of the gunboat flotilla there; her commander at this time was LzS Alexander von Monts. Now Kapitän zur See (KzS—Captain at Sea) Kuhn returned to the ship. Five gunboat flotillas were organized by the end of March; I Division was assigned to the fleet command, II Division was stationed in Swinemünde to defend the mouth of the Oder river, III and V Divisions were based in Stralsund to defend the Kubitzer Bodden and the Bay of Greifswald, and IV Division was tasked with defending Peenemünde. On 15 March, Kuhn took Loreley and three of the divisions for maneuvers off Rügen. Immediately after the start of the war, the Danish Navy imposed a blockade of Prussia's ports in the Baltic, along with those of the other German states in the North Sea. To avoid concerns that the navy would be unable to contribute to the Prussian war effort, the fleet commander Prince Adalbert ordered Eduard von Jachmann to attempt to break the blockade at Swinemünde. He had at his disposal the screw frigate Arcona and the screw corvette Nymphe, supported by Loreley and I Division, which consisted of the gunboats Comet, Hay, Hyäne, Pfeil, Scorpion, and Wespe.

The Prussians scouted the blockade line on 16 March to determine the strength of the Danish squadron, which was commanded by Rear Admiral Edvard van Dockum, that was tasked with enforcing it. Late in the day, they spotted a group of three ships off Cape Arkona, but there was not sufficient daylight left to allow them to engage. The Prussians instead turned south and withdrew back to Swinemünde. Jachmann sortied with his two larger vessels at 07:30 on 17 March, followed by Loreley and the gunboats later that morning. The two groups rendezvoused at 13:15 to the east of Rügen and continued further north to locate the Danish squadron. Jachmann ordered Loreley to leave the gunboats off Rügen, where they would be in position to cover a retreat, and to join his two vessels. Arcona opened fire first, targeting the frigate Sjælland; a few minutes later, after Sjælland closed to 1,500 meters (1,600 yd), Dockum turned his flagship to starboard and began firing broadsides at Arcona. Jachmann turned Arcona to starboard as well, having realized the strength of the Danish squadron. He failed to inform the captains of Loreley and Nymphe of his decision to withdraw, and they continued to steam east for several minutes before they conformed to his maneuver. Loreley and Nymphe came under heavy fire from the pursuing Danish squadron and both vessels were hit by Danish fire. Loreley was hit once by a shell that tore off the davit for her starboard cutter, killing one man, her only casualty in the action. At 16:00, Loreley broke off to the west toward Stralsund and Dockum allowed her to leave, preferring to continue after Jachmann's corvettes.

After the battle, Loreley took the gunboat division to Stralsund. Adalbert ordered all five gunboat divisions to concentrate at Stralsund on 29 March to support the Prussian Army's invasion of the island of Als, but bad weather prevented the vessels from taking part in the operation. Following a ceasefire in May, the Prussian fleet held a naval review in Swinemünde for King Wilhelm I on 6 June; Loreley led the gunboat divisions during the review. Loreley and the rest of the Prussian fleet in the Baltic saw little activity for the rest of the war. After the ceasefire ended in late June, the Danes reimposed the blockade and the Prussian fleet could not challenge it. The war ended quickly thereafter, however, as Prussian and Austrian armies had conquered the entire Jutland Peninsula and Als. The gunboat divisions were then deactivated and on 31 August, Kuhn's command was disestablished. Loreley was decommissioned on 23 September.

=== Reconstruction and station ship in Constantinople ===
By the end of the decade, Loreley was in a badly-deteriorated condition, to the extent that she could not simply be overhauled and returned to service. It was decided to completely rebuild the vessel with a new iron-framed hull, though she retained copper-sheathed wood planking for the hull itself. The boilers were also replaced, though the original engine remained. Her old guns were replaced with newer breechloading guns. The reconstruction was carried out at the Königliche Werft in Wilhelmshaven and it lasted from 1869 to 1873, though the Franco-Prussian War of 1870–1871 delayed progress. She was launched on 19 August 1871, after the end of the war and after completing fitting-out, was commissioned into what was now the Kaiserliche Marine (Imperial Navy) of united Germany on 16 April 1873. She thereafter served as a tender for the Marinestation der Nordsee (North Sea Naval Station), based in Wilhelmshaven. In May, she embarked members of the Reichstag (Imperial Diet) during a visit to the port. Loreley next carried Crown Prince Friedrich and his family on a cruise to the island of Föhr in late July and into August. In September, she conducted a coastal survey cruise with members from the General Staff.

Little is known of Loreley's activity during the period from 1874 to 1878. She went to Folkestone on 18 June 1878 to take part in salvage work for the turret ship Grosser Kurfürst that had been sunk there in an accidental collision the previous month. Her crew assisted in the burial of those killed in the sinking at a local cemetery. She returned to Wilhelmshaven on 21 September, and the following year work began to prepare the vessel to serve as the station ship in Constantinople; Germany had inherited Prussia's rights under the 1856 Treaty of Paris to operate a vessel in the Black Sea, and Loreley was to fill this role once again. She left Germany on 20 July, bound for the Ottoman Empire, arriving in the Bosporus on 30 August. At that time, she was based in Büyükdere in Constantinople, and during her service in the Ottoman capital over the next decade, she periodically steamed to Galați, Romania, where she received new crews. Loreley began a tour of the region that continued into April 1880, which she repeated in 1881, this time extending it to include ports in the Aegean Sea.

During the 'Urabi revolt in 1882 that resulted in the British bombardment of Alexandria, Loreley joined other German warships in the eastern Mediterranean to protect German interests in the area. These included the screw corvettes Gneisenau and Nymphe, the aviso Zieten, and the gunboat Cyclop. The German vessels were primarily tasked with protecting the German embassy in Alexandria. In addition to her routine voyages in 1883, Loreley also carried the German ambassador to the Ottoman Empire on a cruise. On 2 November, she left Constantinople to rendezvous with the screw corvettes Sophie and Prinz Adalbert, the latter carrying Crown Prince Friedrich on a visit to Spain. She met the other vessels in Genoa, Italy four days later, and the three ships proceeded to Spain. While on the way, Loreley was damaged by a storm and had to be taken under tow by Sophie. One of the tow lines became entangled in one of Loreley's paddle wheels, forcing both ships to turn, but the crew cleared the line and the vessels reached Valencia, Spain on 22 November. Loreley had to be detached for repairs, which were conducted in La Valletta, Malta. She was dry-docked there on 19 December and after completing repairs, returned to the Bosporus, arriving on 10 April 1884.

The years 1884 and 1885 passed uneventfully for Loreley, with the only event of note another period in the shipyard in La Valletta from 20 January 1885 to 12 February. She saw more activity in 1886, conducting training cruises to Rhodes, Cyprus, and the coast of Palestine early in the year. Increased tensions between the Ottomans and Greece led to a blockade of Greece by the Great Powers to try to reduce the possibility of a conflict. The German chancellor, Otto von Bismarck, ordered Loreley to take the ambassador to Sultan Abdul Hamid II to convey German support; Loreley was to act as a hospital ship for Ottoman officers in the event of a conflict. The crisis abated following the intervention of the Great Powers, and Loreley instead went to La Valletta for another overhaul at the end of the year that lasted until 20 April 1887. In 1888, Loreley's berth was transferred to Therapia, where Germany's embassy was also relocated. The following year, the new Kaiser, Wilhelm II, and his wife traveled to Greece to attend the wedding of his sister Sophie to Constantine, the heir to the Greek throne. Wilhelm and his wife traveled with the ironclad training squadron, which Loreley met in Piraeus on 21 October. She remained there until 30 October, when she returned to Constantinople to make preparations for the Kaiser's visit with the Sultan.

Loreley saw no events of note from 1890 to 1892. She visited Greece in 1893 and while there had to go into drydock at the Salamis Naval Base for repairs to her propulsion system. In May 1894, Loreley and the other European vessels stationed in Constantinople took part in ceremonies overseen by King Carol I of Romania that marked the 50th anniversary of the opening of the Danube at Sulina during the Crimean War. In June, she conducted surveys of the waters around the Cyclades island group, followed by a visit to Alexandria, from which she returned to Constantinople on 10 July. She embarked Kapitänleutnant (KL—Lieutenant Captain) Eugen Kalau vom Hofe, the naval attache to Russia, for a tour of the Black Sea, including Russian ports in the region. The Russian government was concerned about the cruise and Loreley met unfriendly receptions in the Russian ports she inspected, but the Treaty of Paris permitted such visits. During unrest from Ottoman Armenians in 1895, Loreley conducted small-scale landings in the area to protect German interests. Germany sent limited reinforcements in the form of the screw corvette Moltke and the coastal defense ship Hagen to support these operations.

By this time, Loreley was once again badly worn out and in need of replacement. She conducted a final cruise in the Black Sea in early 1896 and was then struck from the naval register on 10 August, though she remained in commission until 7 September when she was replaced by a newly procured steam yacht. Her crew began their voyage home and the vessel remained under the supervision of the German station commander until 23 October, when she was sold. Her ultimate fate is unknown.
