= Max von Brandt =

German diplomat (1835–1920)

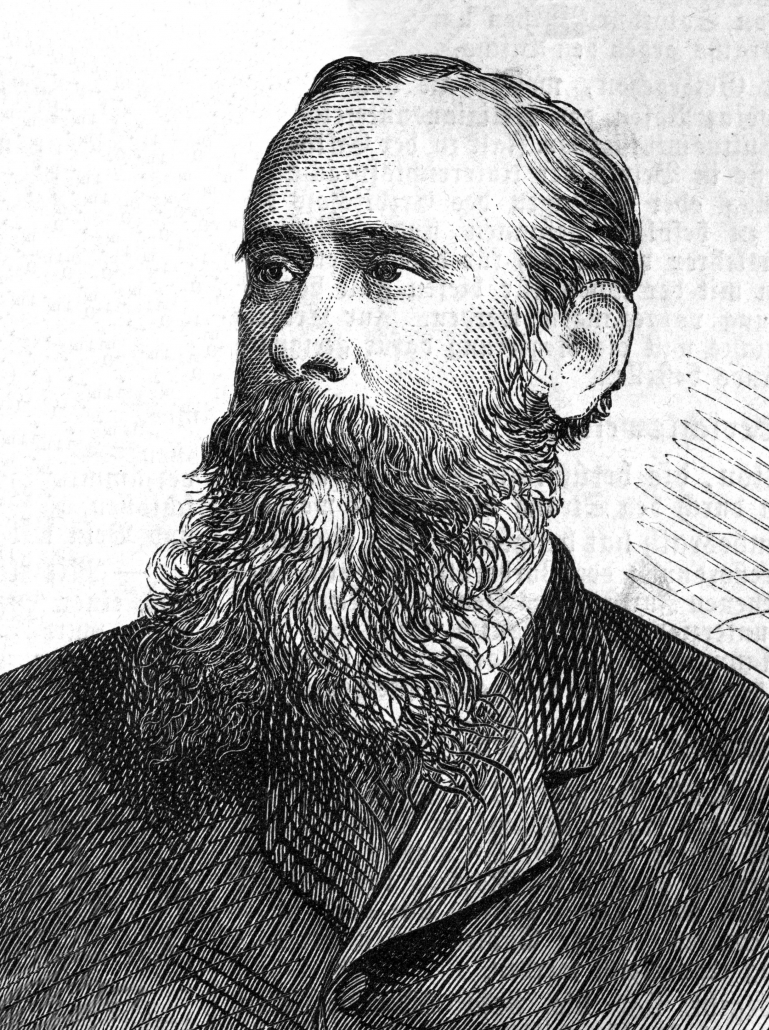

Maximilian August Scipio von Brandt (8 October 1835 – 24 August 1920) was a German diplomat, East Asia expert and publicist.

== Biography ==
Max von Brandt was the son of Prussian general and military author Heinrich von Brandt. He was baptized as Protestant and attended the French College in Berlin. At first he became a Prussian officer before taking part in the Eulenburg Expedition of 1860/61 to East Asia leading to the signage of a Japanese-Prussian trade-treaty on January, 24th. Afterwards, Max von Brandt was consul and later general consul of the North German Confederation, and from 1872, German "Ministerresident" in Japan. From 1875 to 1893 he then was imperial envoy in China and, in 1882/1883, concluded a trade- and amicability-treaty with Korea, where he intensely studied the culture and history of East Asia. Due to his detailed knowledge of Asia, his impressive personality as well as his pleasantness, von Brandt was highly esteemed in Beijing, where he became doyen of the diplomatic corps for many years.

== Japan post ==
Max von Brandt spent most of his diplomatic career serving in East Asia, where he was first a part of the Prussian mission in 1860. Two years later, he became the Prussian consul at Yokohama. In his early years in the region, he was mostly dismissed due to his low rank as a consul. Brandt, therefore, acquired a tendency to assert himself in order to coordinate the German policy with the other representatives of treaty powers in East Asia. It was said that, in order to do this, he often outlined ambitious colonial projects to assert his own influence.

There were several recorded documents that offer insights into Brandt's activities in Japan. For example, he started cultivating German assets, whom he sent to serve as military advisers to emerging Japanese groups after learning of the successes of a German sergeant called Carl Koppen. Koppen built a reputation for transforming a band of samurai into a modern army in Wakayama.

Brandt played an important political role in Japan during the 1860s, alongside fellow Western diplomats Dirk de Graeff van Polsbroek, Townsend Harris, Rutherford Alcock and Gustave Duchesne, Prince de Bellecourt. Although these men were bound by personal friendship, national rivalries and differences in dealing with the Japanese led to conflict and antagonism. However, the chaotic and ungovernable circumstances of the first few years forced them to cooperate. He solidified his position in Japan by successfully transitioning the focus of the German policy in the country. Initially, there was the ambition of creating a German colonial outpost in Ezo (Hokkaido), Japan. However, due to the consolidation of Japan under the Meiji emperor, Brandt promoted the expansion of German commercial and cultural presence in the country.

== Works ==
- Sprache und Schrift der Chinesen, Breslau, o.J. (ca. 1883) (41 Seiten).
- Aus dem Land des Zopfes - Plaudereien eines alten Chinesen, Leipzig 1884 (132 Seiten), 2. Aufl. 1898 (195 Seiten).
- Sittenbilder aus China - Mädchen und Frauen - Ein Beitrag zur Kenntnis des chinesischen Volkes, Stuttgart 1895 (87 Seiten), 2. Aufl. 1900.
- Die Zukunft Ostasiens - Ein Beitrag zur Geschichte und zum Verständnis der ostasiatischen Frage, Stuttgart 1895 (80 Seiten), 2. Aufl. 1903.
- Drei Jahre ostasiatische Politik 1894-97, Stuttgart 1897 (263 Seiten).
- Ostasiatische Fragen - China, Japan, Korea - Altes und Neues, Berlin 1897 (359 Seiten).
- Colonien- und Flottenfrage (Vortrag), Berlin 1897 (23 Seiten).
- Die politische und commerzielle Entwicklung Ostasiens während der jüngsten Zeit (Vortrag), Leipzig 1898 (24 Seiten).
- Die chinesische Philosophie und der Staats-Confucianismus, Stuttgart 1898 (121 Seiten).
- China und seine Handelsbeziehungen zum Ausland mit besonderer Berücksichtigung der deutschen (= Schriften der Centralstelle zur Vorbereitung von Handelsverträgen 5), Berlin 1899.
- Industrielle und Eisenbahn-Unternehmungen in China (= Verhandlungen der Deutschen Kolonialgesellschaft 3/4), Berlin 1899.
- Zeitfragen - die Krisis in Südafrika - China - Commerzielles und Politisches - Colonialfragen, Berlin 1900 (394 Seiten).
- 33 Jahre in Ostasien - Erinnerungen eines deutschen Diplomaten, Leipzig 1901 (319 Seiten).
- Fremde Früchte - Sienkiewicz/Hearn/Kipling/Gorki, Stuttgart 1904.
- Die englische Kolonialpolitik und Kolonialverwaltung, Halle a. S. 1906.
- George Bogle und Thomas Manning: Aus dem Lande der lebenden Buddhas. Die Erzählungen von der Mission George Bogle's nach Tibet und Thomas Manning's Reise nach Lhasa (1774 und 1812). Aus dem Englischen des Mr. Clements R. Markham. Übersetzt und bearbeitet von Wirkl. Geh. Rat Max von Brandt. Hamburg 1909.
- Der Chinese in der Öffentlichkeit und der Familie - Wie er sich selbst sieht und schildert - In 82 Zeichnungen nach chinesischen Originalen, Berlin, ca. 1910.
- China, Japan und Korea in: Weltgeschichte (Hans Ferdinand Helmolt, Hrsg.), Bibliographisches Institut, Leipzig/Wien 1913, Band I.
- China und Japan jetzt und später, Leipzig 1914.
- Japan, Braunschweig 1920.

== Literature ==
- George Alexander Lensen: Balance of Intrigue: International Rivalry in Korea and Manchuria 1884 - 1899, Florida University Press, Tallahassee 1982, Vol. I & II, ISBN 0-8130-0722-4.
- Rolf-Harald Wippich: „Max von Brandt und die Gründung der OAG (Gesellschaft für Natur- und Völkerkunde Ostasiens) - Die erste deutsche wissenschaftliche Vereinigung in Ostasien", in: Studien des Instituts für Kultur der deutschsprachigen Länder, 1993, Nr. 11, S. 64-77
- Rolf-Harald Wippich: „Strich mit Mütze" - Max von Brandt und Japan - Diplomat, Publizist, Propagandist, Tokyo 1995, ISBN 4-87238-006-1.
- Rolf-Harald Wippich: Japan als Kolonie? Max von Brandts Hokkaido-Projekt 1865/67, Hamburg 1997, ISBN 3-934376-53-3.
- Richard Szippel: Max v. Brandt and German Imperialism in East Asia in the Late Nineteenth Century (Doktorarbeit, Universität Notre Dame, Notre Dame, Indiana, USA), August 1989, 332 Seiten (University Microfilm International, Ann Arbor, Michigan, USA, Bestell-Nr. 8923270).
- Richard Szippel, „End of the Century: Japan through German Eyes - Max von Brandt and Japan, 1894 - 1914", German History 9, 309 - 326, October 1991.
- Richard von Szippel, „Japanese and American Expansion in the Late Nineteenth and Early Twentieth Century: German Perspective from Writings of Max von Brandt", Nanzan Review of American Studies 15, 33 - 53 (1993).
- Richard Szippel: „A German View of the Boxer Rebellion in China at the Turn of the Century: Max von Brandt and German Interests in China at the Turn of the Century", Academia - Humanities and Social Studies (Nanzan University) 58, 47 - 76, September 1993.
- Richard Szippel: „Max von Brandt's View of America at the Turn of the Century", Nanzan Review of American Studies 17, 59 - 80 (1995).
- Hans-Alexander Kneider: „Deutsch-koreanische Beziehungen - Von den Anfängen bis zum Jahre 1910", in: Korea 1996 - Politik, Wirtschaft, Gesellschaft (Patrick Köllner, Hrsg.), Hamburg 1996, S. 19 - 49. Auszug
- Richaed Szippel: „The Cross and the Flag - Christian Missions in Late Nineteenth-Century China from the Perspectiv of the German Diplomat Max von Brandt", Mission Studies (International Association for Mission Studies) XIV, 175 - 202, October 1997.
- Aya Puster, „Max von Brandt no hajimeteno Nippon taizai" (Der erste Japan-Aufenthalt von Max von Brandt), in: Ronja Nihon no yogaku (Studien über die europäische Wissenschaft in Japan), Osaka 1998.
- Masako Hiyama: „Max von Brandt (1835-1920)". In: Brückenbauer. Pioniere des japanisch-deutschen Kulturaustausches. iudicium, Berlin 2005. ISBN 3-89129-539-1

== See also ==
- German-Japanese relations
- Sino-German relations
- Treaty of Amity and Commerce between Japan and Prussia (1861)
