= Treaty of Amity and Commerce between Prussia and Japan =

Japan-Prussia Treaty of 1861

The Treaty of Amity and Commerce between the Kingdom of Prussia and the Tokugawa Shogunate (Japanese: 徳川幕府) (1861) opened diplomatic relations and trade between the two countries. This would come in a series of unequal treaties imposed on the Tokugawa Shogunate in its later stages.

== Historical context ==
The treaty was signed in Edo on January 24, 1861, by Count Friedrich Albrecht zu Eulenburg, Envoy Extraordinary and Plenipotentiary Minister of the Prince Regent of Prussia at the Courts of China, Japan, and Siam on the one hand, and by Muragaki Awaji no kami (村垣淡路守), Takemoto Zusho no kami (竹本図書頭) and Kurokawa Satsu (黒川左中), Plenipotentiaries of the Shogun from Japan on the other side.

The Treaty was the 7th signed by Japan with a foreign country, and was preceded by similar treaties with the United States, France, Russia, Great-Britain and Holland in 1858 (the so-called Ansei Treaties), and with Portugal in 1860. These treaties formed an essential part in opening up Japan, ending a period of some 250 years of Japan’s seclusion from the world, known as “sakoku”.

== Negotiations ==
When the Eulenburg Expedition arrived in Edo on 4 September 1860, the position of the Shogun and its administration towards treaties with foreign countries had shifted. Japan considered its internal situation not stable enough for any additional international treaties, and this also applied to Prussia. The Treaty with Portugal signed on 3 August 1860 only came about because of a promise made to the Dutch in 1857 for such a treaty.

The Japanese refusal to treat with Prussia was only reversed after an intervention of the U.S. Representative Townsend Harris. He enabled a break through by combining negotiations for a Prussian treaty with the Japanese desire of postponing the opening of the cities of Osaka and Edo, and the Ports of Hyogo and Niigata, as foreseen in the first six treaties. Harris proposed to limit the ports open to Prussia to Nagasaki, Yokohama and Hakodate, and not to mention the opening of Osaka, Edo, Hyogo and Niigata. The proposal was accepted by the Shogunate, and led to the Treaty of Amity and Commerce between Prussia and Japan, signed on January 24, 1861, in Edo. It had taken 3 months and 3 weeks since the arrival of the Eulenburg mission at Edo.

== Coverage and entry into force ==
The Treaty obtained was only half satisfactory to Count Eulenburg. He had been mandated to negotiate a treaty not only for Prussia, but also for the states belonging to the Zollverein, the Mecklenburg Grand Duchies and the Hanse Cities. Once understood how many states and cities this implied, the Government of the Shogun resolutely refused to include them in the negotiations. Therefore, the Treaty obtained only covered Prussia.

Article 23 of the Treaty contains the date of entry into force: 1 January 1863.

== Exchange of the ratifications ==
The exchange of the ratifications of the Treaty of 24 January 1861 between Prussia and Japan took place on board the Prussian frigate SMS Gazelle in the Bay of Edo on 20 February 1864. The Prussian Envoy, Guido von Rehfues, had arrived at Yokohama mid August 1863 with the Treaty ratified by the King of Prussia. It took him 6 months to induce the Japanese Government to accept the exchange of the ratifications.

== Description ==
The most important points of the Treaty between Prussia and Japan are:

- Exchange of diplomatic agents (article 2)
- The ports and cities of Hakodate, Nagasaki and Yokohama are open for trade with Prussian nationals, and Prussian nationals have the right to reside and trade at will in these ports (article 3).
- Freedom of religion for Prussians living in these 3 ports and cities (article 4).
- A system of extraterritoriality that provided for the subjugation of Prussian residents in the 3 ports or cities to the laws of their own consular courts instead of the Japanese law system (articles 5 to 7).
- Introduction of fixed import-export duties for Prussian trade with Japan (articles 8, 10 and 16)

The first Prussian Consul to Japan was Maximalian von Brandt, who arrived in Japan on 25 December 1862.

== See also ==
- List of German ministers, envoys and ambassadors to Japan
- Germany-Japan relations
- Treaty of Amity and Commerce (United States-Japan) on July 29, 1858.
- Treaty of Amity and Commerce between the Netherlands and Japan on August 18, 1858.
- Anglo-Japanese Treaty of Amity and Commerce on August 26, 1858.
- Treaty of Amity and Commerce between France and Japan on October 9, 1858.
- Treaty of Peace, Amity and Commerce between Portugal and Japan on August 3, 1860.
