= Eulenburg expedition =

Prussian diplomatic mission (1859–1862)

The Eulenburg expedition was a diplomatic mission conducted by Friedrich Albrecht zu Eulenburg on behalf of Prussia and the German Customs Union in 1859–1862. Its aim was to establish diplomatic and commercial relations with China, Japan and Siam.

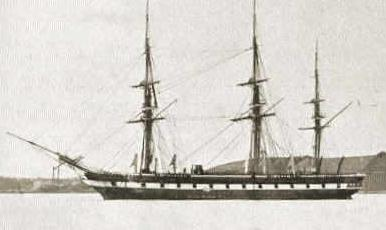
SMS Arcona

== Background ==
Illustration of the Eulenburg expedition

In 1859, Prince Wilhelm of Prussia, who was acting as regent for his seriously ill brother Friedrich Wilhelm IV, appointed Friedrich Albrecht Count of Eulenburg Extraordinary Envoy to a Prussian Mission to Eastern Asia.

The major participants of the expedition were Friedrich Albrecht zu Eulenburg, Lucius von Ballhausen (doctor), Max von Brandt (attaché), Wilhelm Heine (painter), Albert Berg (artist), Hinrik Sundewall (squadron commander) Karl Eduard Heusner, Fritz von Hollmann, Reinhold von Werner, Ferdinand von Richthofen and Gustav Spiess.

The expedition was provided with three warships: SMS Arcona, SMS Thetis, and SMS Frauenlob, along with the merchant vessel Elbe, which the navy purchased to support the squadron.

== Japan ==
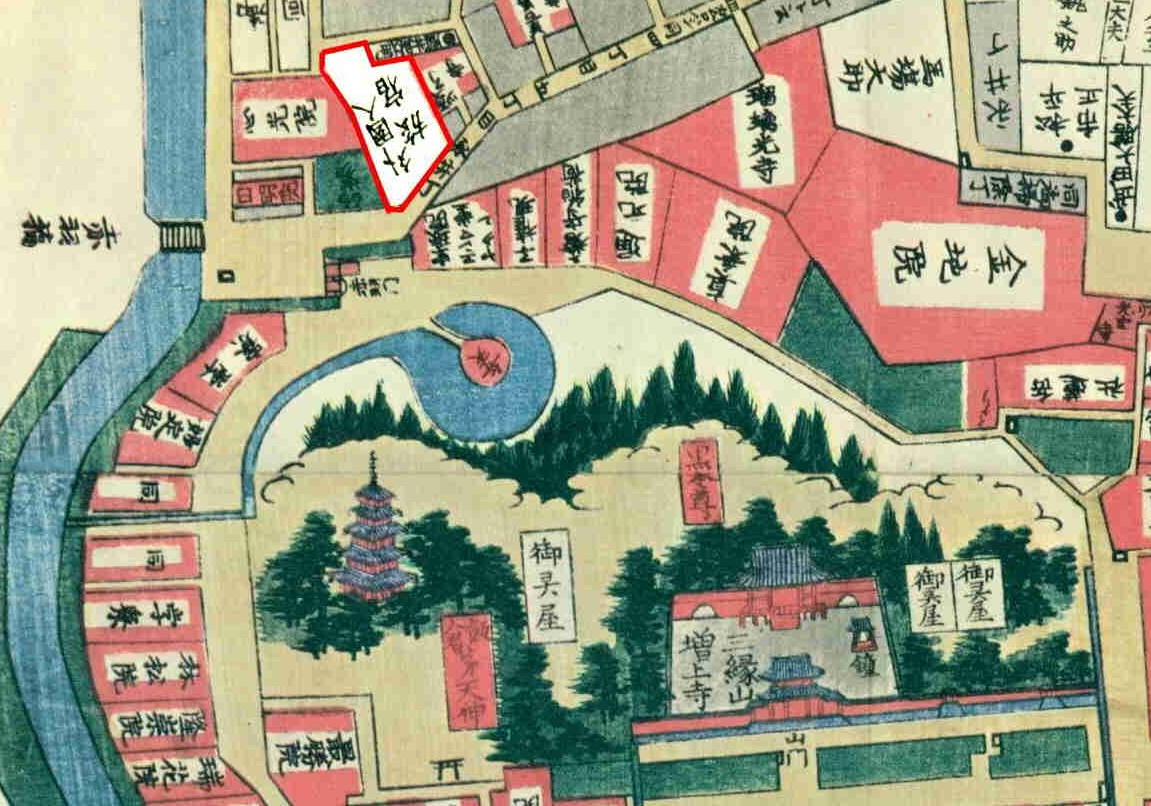
Guesthouse for foreigners in Edo, built 1859 (marked on upper left). It was in close vicinity to Shogunate family cemetery in Zōjō-ji Temple (lower right).

Before the expedition even reached Japan, the Frauenlob was lost in a typhoon outside Yokohama on 5 September 1860, losing its entire crew of five officers and 42 men, and the two remaining ships decided to anchor in Edo Bay. The negotiations with the Bakufu were protracted and would last for several months.

Before the treaty was signed, Count Eulenburg suffered another setback. During the negotiations with the Bakufu, Count Eulenburg had been assisted by Henry Heusken, a Dutch-American interpreter who usually worked for the US consul Townsend Harris. After having dinner with Count Eulenburg on the night of 15 January 1861, Heusken repaired to the American Legation at Zenpuku Temple in Edo. He was accompanied by three mounted officers and four footmen bearing lanterns. The party was suddenly ambushed by seven shishi from the Satsuma clan. Heusken suffered mortal wounds to both sides of his body in the fight. He mounted a horse and galloped about 200 yards to the American Legation, where he was taken inside and treated. Later that night Heusken died of his wounds. This setback did not derail the treaty negotiations, and after four months of negotiations, Count Eulenburg and representatives from the Bakufu signed the "Treaty of Amity, Commerce and Navigation" on 24 January 1861. The treaty was based on other commercial treaties that Japan had signed with other Western powers and it would later count as one of the serial "unequal treaties" that Japan had been forced to sign in the late Tokugawa period.

== China ==
In May 1861, the Eulenburg expedition arrived in Tianjin, where Count Eulenburg initiated negotiations with the Zongli Yamen for a commercial treaty with the Qing Empire. This was not at a very good time for China, since Britain and France had just invaded Beijing in the Second Opium War and the Xianfeng Emperor was still exiled in Chengde. The negotiations took three months and the Emperor died in late August. Finally on 2 September 1861, Count Eulenburg and Qing representative Chonglun signed a commercial treaty with the Qing Empire, which was modeled on the French Treaty of Tianjin. In the treaty, Prussia represented the whole German Customs Union and the treaty would govern Sino-German relations until World War I, when the treaty was repudiated by China.

== Siam ==
When the expedition reached Siam, the delegation had been expected by King Mongkut for a year. He "expressed his delight and inquired about the number and size of the warships, immediately thereafter he asked if the Prussians maintained colonies or had the intention to acquire them." The question answered in the negative "consoled him: he was all the more delighted to gain new unselfish friends as the old ones just became difficult" (Fritz Count of Eulenburg). After a long stay, on 17 February 1862 Fritz Count of Eulenburg signed a Treaty in the name of Prussia, the States of the Customs Union and Mecklenburg.

== Legacy ==
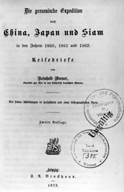
An Account of the expedition published by Werner Von Reinhold

Several participants in the expedition, including Count Eulenburg himself, wrote accounts of the East Asian expedition. Ferdinand von Richthofen later remarked that of the 64 Naval officers who took part in the expedition, 23 went on to have substantial rank in later years.

The photographic record of this visit to Japan opens a window which becomes unique reference source.

=== Sesquicentennial ===
The 150th anniversary of Japanese-German relations commemorates the Eulenburg expedition and both the short- and long-term consequences of the treaty of amity and commerce which was signed by Japanese and German negotiators. From autumn 2010 through autumn 2011, events were planned in Germany and in Japan hoping "to 'raise the treasures of our common past' in order to build a bridge to the future."

== See also ==
- Unequal treaty
