= SMS Frauenlob (1855) =

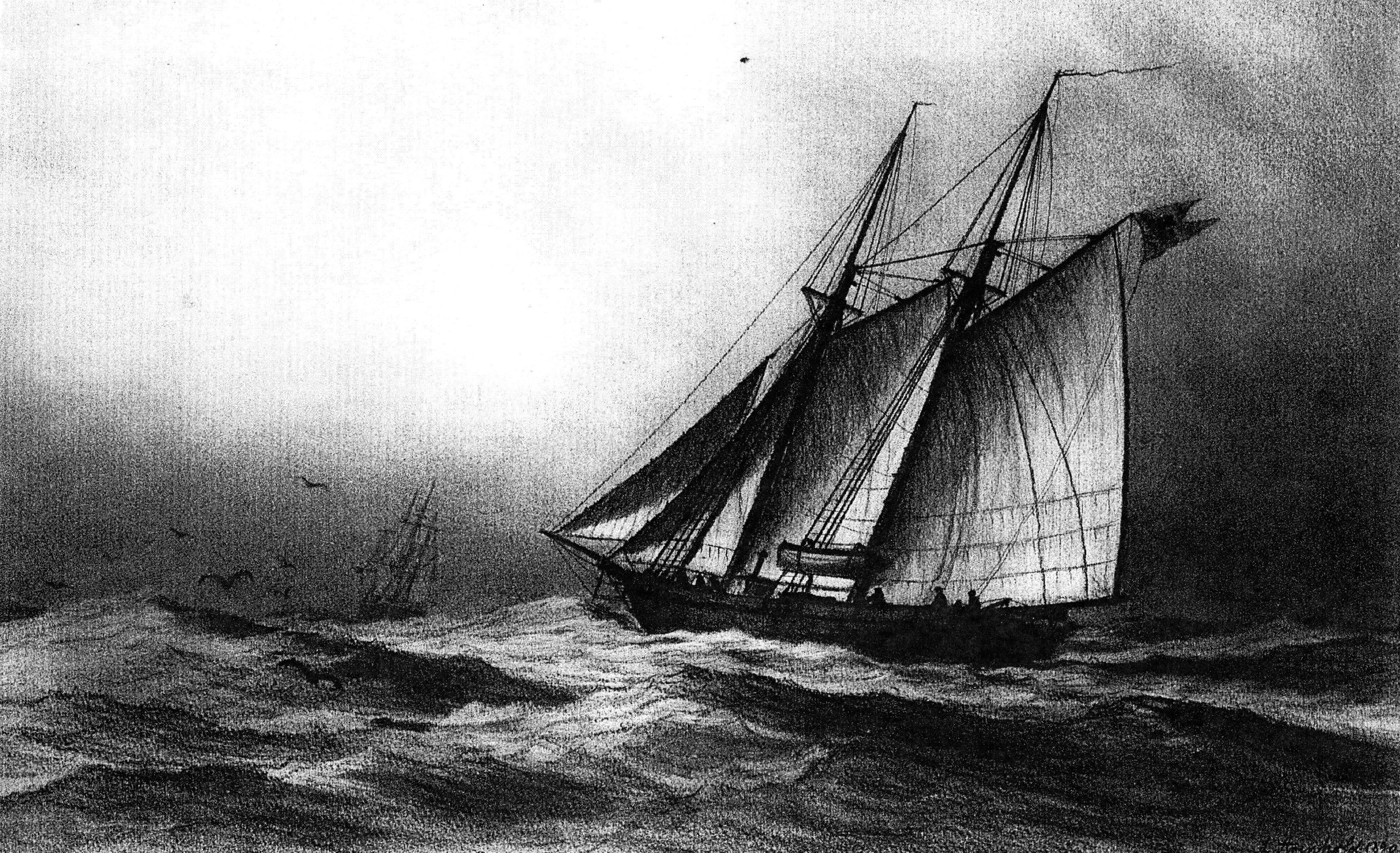
- Frauenlob at sea, 1891 painting by Lüder Arenhold

History

Prussia
- Name: SMS Frauenlob
- Builder: Lübke, Wolgast
- Cost: 43.000 Thaler
- Laid down: 1849
- Launched: 24 August 1855
- Sponsored by: German Women
- Commissioned: 1 May 1856
- Fate: Sunk in a typhoon off Yokohama, 2 September 1860
- Notes: originally called Frauengabe (Women's gift)

General characteristics
- Type: Schooner
- Displacement: 305 t (300 long tons)
- Length: 32.1 m (105 ft 4 in)
- Beam: 8.1 m (26 ft 7 in)
- Draft: 2.61 m (8 ft 7 in)
- Sail plan: 523 m^{2} (5,630 sq ft)
- Speed: 13 kn (24 km/h)
- Boats & landing craft carried: 4
- Complement: 5 officers, 42 men
- Armament: 1 × 30-pounder

SMS Frauenlob ("Praise of Women") was a Prussian naval schooner. The first German naval vessel of that name, she was financed largely by voluntary contributions of German women following the German Revolution of 1848. The keel for Frauengabe (Women's gift) was laid down in 1849 and she was launched on 24 August 1855 in Wolgast as Frauenlob. She was commissioned on 1 May 1856. In 1859, Frauenlob participated in the Eulenburg Expedition and was lost on 2 September 1860 in a typhoon off Yokohama with all hands. Her name was later taken by the light cruisers SMS Frauenlob of 1902 and SMS Frauenlob of 1918.

== Design and construction ==
The Frauenlob was a clinker-built ship, the hull of which was made with a transverse frame and covered with copper plates for protection. She had gaff rigging on two masts with a total sail area of 523 m^{2}, which enabled a top speed of 13 knots.

The construction contract was given to the Wolgast shipyard in Lübke, which also drew up the construction plans. The construction costs of around 43,000 thalers were partly financed with the collected donations, the shortfall was subsidized by the War Ministry.
