= SMS Hertha (1864) =

- Hertha in port, date unknown

History

Prussia
- Name: SMS Hertha
- Namesake: Nerthus
- Builder: Königliche Werft, Danzig
- Laid down: 1 September 1860
- Launched: 1 October 1864
- Commissioned: 1 November 1865
- Decommissioned: 22 November 1882
- Stricken: 12 August 1884
- Fate: Scrapped, 1902

General characteristics
- Class & type: Arcona-class frigate
- Displacement: 2,504 t (2,464 long tons)
- Length: 73.32 m (240 ft 7 in)
- Beam: 12.9 m (42 ft 4 in)
- Draft: 5.52 m (18 ft 1 in)
- Installed power: 4 × fire-tube boilers; 1,510 PS (1,490 ihp)
- Propulsion: 1 × marine steam engine; 1 × screw propeller
- Sail plan: Full-rigged ship
- Speed: 11.5 knots (21.3 km/h; 13.2 mph)
- Range: 1,350 nmi (2,500 km; 1,550 mi) at 11 knots (20 km/h; 13 mph)
- Complement: 35 officers; 345 enlisted men
- Armament: 28 × 68-pounder guns

SMS Hertha was a member of the Arcona class of steam frigates built for the Prussian Navy in the 1860s. The class comprised five ships, and were the first major steam-powered warships ordered for the Prussian Navy. The ships were ordered as part of a major construction program to strengthen the nascent Prussian fleet, under the direction of Prince Adalbert, and were intended to provide defense against the Royal Danish Navy. Hertha was armed with a battery of twenty-eight guns, and was capable of steaming at a speed of 11.5 knots (21.3 km/h; 13.2 mph). Hertha was laid down in 1860, launched in 1864, and commissioned in 1865.

The ship was activated during the Austro-Prussian War in 1866, but saw no action during the brief conflict. Next reactivated in 1867 into what was now the North German Federal Navy, Hertha made a cruise to the Mediterranean Sea that concluded in 1868. During the voyage, her crew assisted in the recovery of the grounded French corvette Roland. Hertha next returned to the Mediterranean in 1869 for the opening ceremonies of the Suez Canal, after which she sailed on for a tour of East Asia. She was still there in mid-1870 when the Franco-Prussian War broke out. Hertha was quickly trapped in Yokohama, Japan, along with the corvette Medusa, by superior French naval forces. As a result, she saw no action during that war. She returned home after the war ended in 1871.

Hertha went another major overseas cruise in 1874 for a circumnavigation of the globe, during which she spent a significant amount of time in East Asia and the central Pacific Ocean. There, her captain, Eduard von Knorr, negotiated trade agreements with Tonga and Samoa before returning to Germany in mid-1877. A shorter cruise in the Mediterranean followed from mid-1877 to early 1878. In late 1880, she embarked on her last major overseas voyage, which again took the ship to East Asia and the Pacific. The voyage concluded with a cruise around Africa, after which Hertha returned to Germany in late 1882. She was struck from the naval register in 1884, converted into a coal storage hulk, and used in that capacity until 1902, when she was broken up.

== Design ==
In the immediate aftermath of the First Schleswig War against Denmark, Prince Adalbert began drawing up plans for the future of the Prussian Navy; he also secured the Jade Treaty that saw the port of Wilhelmshaven transferred to Prussia from the Duchy of Oldenburg, and which provided the Prussian fleet with an outlet on the North Sea. Adalbert called for a force of three screw frigates and six screw corvettes to protect Prussian maritime trade in the event of another war with Denmark. Design work was carried out between 1854 and 1855, and the first two ships were authorized in November 1855; a further pair was ordered in June 1860, and the final member of the class was ordered in February 1866.

Hertha was 73.32 meters (240 ft 7 in) long overall and had a beam of 12.9 m (42 ft 4 in) and a draft of 5.52 m (18 ft 1 in) forward. She displaced 2,113 metric tons (2,080 long tons) as designed and 2,504 t (2,464 long tons) at full load. The ship had short forecastle and sterncastle decks. Her superstructure consisted primarily of a small deckhouse aft. She had a crew of 35 officers and 345 enlisted men.

Her propulsion system consisted of a single horizontal single-expansion steam engine driving a single screw propeller, with steam supplied by four coal-burning fire-tube boilers. Exhaust was vented through a single funnel located amidships. Hertha was rated to steam at a top speed of 8 knots (15 km/h; 9.2 mph), but she significantly exceeded this speed, reaching 11.5 knots (21.3 km/h; 13.2 mph) from 1,510 metric horsepower (1,490 ihp). The ship had a cruising radius of about 1,350 nautical miles (2,500 km; 1,550 mi) at a speed of 11 knots (20 km/h; 13 mph). To supplement the steam engine on long voyages abroad, she carried a full-ship rig with a total surface area of 2,200 m^{2} (24,000 sq ft). The screw could be retracted while cruising under sail.

Hertha was armed with a battery of twenty-eight 68-pounder guns. By 1869, she had been rearmed with a battery of seventeen 15 cm (5.9 in) RK L/22 guns and two 12.5 cm (4.9 in) K L/23 guns.

== Service history ==
Hertha, named for a misreading of the old Germanic goddess Nerthus, was laid down at the Königliche Werft (Royal Dockyard) in Danzig on 1 September 1860. Work on the ship was delayed due to shortages of wooden timbers for her hull. Budget shortages in October 1862 further delayed completion of the ship, and the Landtag (state diet) refused to grant further funds for the ship. Only after the threat of war with Denmark over the Schleswig–Holstein question became increasingly likely in late 1863 did work on the ship resume. It was hoped that the ship could be completed in time for the imminent war with Denmark, but work had been delayed too long. She was launched on 1 October 1864, after the Second Schleswig War was all but over. After completing fitting out work, she was commissioned into active service for sea trials on 1 November 1865. Initial testing was carried out in Danzig Bay, after which she moved to the recently conquered port of Kiel in Schleswig on 16 November. Additional tests were carried out over the following week, and on 22 November, she had her crew reduced, though she remained in service through the winter months.

As war with Austria became increasingly likely by Spring 1866, preparations were made to reactivate Hertha, and Korvettenkapitän (KK—Corvette Captain) Franz Kinderling arrived to take command of the vessel in March. She had her crew replenished on 12 May, and on 15 May, King Wilhelm I ordered the fleet to mobilize. Hertha joined a squadron commanded by Konteradmiral (Rear Admiral) Eduard von Jachmann, which he commanded from Hertha's sister ship Arcona; the unit also included their sister Gazelle, the ironclad warships Arminius and Prinz Adalbert, the corvettes Augusta and Victoria, and several screw gunboats. Hertha took the training ships Niobe, Rover, and Musquito under tow further east to Darßer Ort; from there, the three ships sailed on their own to Danzig. Most of Jachmann's squadron remained in the Baltic Sea and did not see combat during the Austro-Prussian War, as the Austrian Navy remained in the Adriatic Sea and none of the hostile German states possessed a navy of their own. After the short war ended in Prussian victory, Jachmann's squadron was disbanded and Hertha returned to Danzig, where she was decommissioned on 6 October.

=== 1867–1868 Mediterranean cruise ===
Hertha next recommissioned on 10 April 1867, into service with what was now the North German Federal Navy, initially to conduct training cruises in the western Baltic. At this time, she came under command of Kapitän zur See (KzS—Captain at Sea) Eduard Heldt. From 2 to 25 August, she served as the flagship Jachmann, commander of a newly formed Training Squadron, which at that time only included the corvette Medusa; Jachmann had planned to commission Gazelle and the corvette Nymphe, but neither were in mechanical condition to be reactivated. This was the first time the Training Squadron was activated. The two ships were sent to the Mediterranean Sea later that year, still under Jachmann's command, in part to represent Prussia at the marriage of King George I of Greece to Olga Constantinovna of Russia, but also in response to the Cretan Revolt. The conflict threatened Germans living on the island of Crete, and the ships were to protect them. Hertha and Medusa left Kiel on 14 September, carrying additional men, who were transferred to the newly built ironclad Kronprinz when they stopped in Portsmouth, United Kingdom, on 1 October. By 2 November, Hertha had arrived in Piraeus, Greece, while Medusa sailed directly to Crete. Hertha joined her there by 8 December, and the gunboat Blitz had arrived as well, further strengthening the German contingent.

Heldt transferred to Medusa to sail to Constantinople to request permission to pass through the Bosporus and cruise in the Black Sea, leaving Hertha's executive officer, Kapitänleutnant (Lieutenant Captain) Louis von Blanc temporarily in command. While Heldt was away on 25 December, Blanc received a request from the German consul at Smyrna to come to the assistance of the French corvette Roland, which had run aground off Chios. Hertha and Blitz sailed to help the French vessel, and the Norwegian corvette Nordstjernen came to assist as well. Between the four ships, their crews worked to lighten Roland, by which time the French steamer SS Vatican and the corvette Catinat had arrived; initial attempts to pull Roland free failed. On 28 December, the French frigate Renommée arrived, carrying Admiral Simon, who took charge of the salvage effort. The following day, the international effort succeeded in refloating Roland. To thank the Germans for their efforts, the French government awarded the Legion of Honour to Blanc and wrote a formal letter of thanks to the crew; Prince Adalbert also wrote a letter of thanks.

Medusa joined the two ships in Smyrna, Ottoman Empire, on 12 January 1868, where Heldt returned to Hertha. The ships cruised in the Aegean Sea over the following days, making stops at Salonika and the island of Syros before returning to Smyrna on 24 January. Upon arriving, they received instructions to return home, as tensions between the North German Confederation and France had grown over the latter's demand to annex Luxembourg as compensation for Prussia's expansion after the Austro-Prussian War. (Note: Luxembourg had been part of the German Confederation, which had been dissolved following the Austro-Prussian War.) Hertha and Medusa sailed from Smyrna on 16 February, but they traveled independently; Hertha stopped in Malta, while Medusa first made for Alexandria. Hertha arrived in Kiel on 22 April, and was decommissioned there on 15 May. On the night of 14–15 June, a fire broke out aboard the ship and damaged much of her interior; she was unable to be taken to Danzig for repairs, so workers and materials were transferred to Kiel, where the work was done, which lasted until 8 October. At this time, the ship was rearmed with modern guns.

=== 1869–1872 East Asia cruise ===
Collection of ships at the Suez Canal for its opening in 1869

As German economic activity in East Asia continued to grow in the 1860s, the government decided to establish a permanent East Asia Squadron in 1868, which was to include Hertha and Medusa. But for budgetary reasons, the ships could not depart until the following year. Hertha was recommissioned on 17 July 1869, under the command of KzS Heinrich Köhler. The two ships got underway together once again on 8 September, and while in Plymouth, United Kingdom on 23 September, they received amended orders diverting them to Ottoman Egypt to participate in the opening ceremonies of the Suez Canal. Hertha stopped first in Corfu to embark Crown Prince Friedrich and his entourage, which included General Albrecht von Stosch, but a storm prevented them from boarding there on 19 October. Instead, Hertha sailed to Piraeus, where the group came aboard three days later. Hertha, sailing with the aviso Grille and the gunboat Delphin, stopped first in Constantinople on 24 October so that Friedrich could pay respects to Sultan Abdulaziz before visiting the canal. Four days later, the ships departed south, stopping in Jaffa, Rhodes, and Beirut over the next two weeks. On 14 November, Hertha's sister Elisabeth joined the squadron at Beirut, after which the German vessels departed for Port Said at the northern end of the canal. Arcona had also arrived by this time, completing the German squadron.

A fleet of around sixty ships from numerous countries had gathered in Port Said for the opening ceremony, which took place on 17 November. Friedrich transferred to Grille for the event, which was the third vessel to pass through the canal, behind the French yacht L'Aigle (carrying Empress Eugénie) and the Austro-Hungarian aviso SMS Greif (with Kaiser Franz Joseph aboard). Most of the ships sailed only to Ismailia, halfway through the canal, before returning north; only the smaller vessels continued on to Suez at the southern end of the canal.. In early December, Friedrich and his entourage left the squadron, which dispersed to resume their previous activities. Hertha passed through the canal completely, which required removing some cargo at Ismailia so she could reach Suez by 12 December. Her progress through the canal had been slowed by several other ships that had run aground. By early January 1870, she had departed Suez, bound for Asia. Hertha stopped in Aden and British Ceylon on the way to Singapore, which she reached on 12 February. There, Köhler assumed command of the East Asia Squadron.

Hertha covertly evaluated Blair Bay on the east coast of the Malay Peninsula for potential use as a naval base, under secret orders from Prince Adalbert. After a stop in Saigon on 10 March, she next sailed to China so Köhler could meet with Guido von Rehfues, the German consul in China; the ship thereafter visited Yokohama, Japan, to meet Max von Brandt, on late March. Köhler used these meetings to determine what his priorities in the region should be. The most pressing concerns raised by both diplomats was the need to deter pirates in Chinese waters and to represent Germany at the opening ceremony of the new Japanese naval base at the Yokosuka Naval Arsenal. Hertha arrived at that port for the inauguration of the base on 28 March. Brandt came aboard Hertha for a tour of several Japanese ports from 6 to 16 April, and during this period, a Japanese official accompanied Brandt. Hertha then sailed to China to attempt to suppress pirate activity there. While patrolling the Chinese coast, she seized a suspicious junk but had no other interaction with pirate vessels.

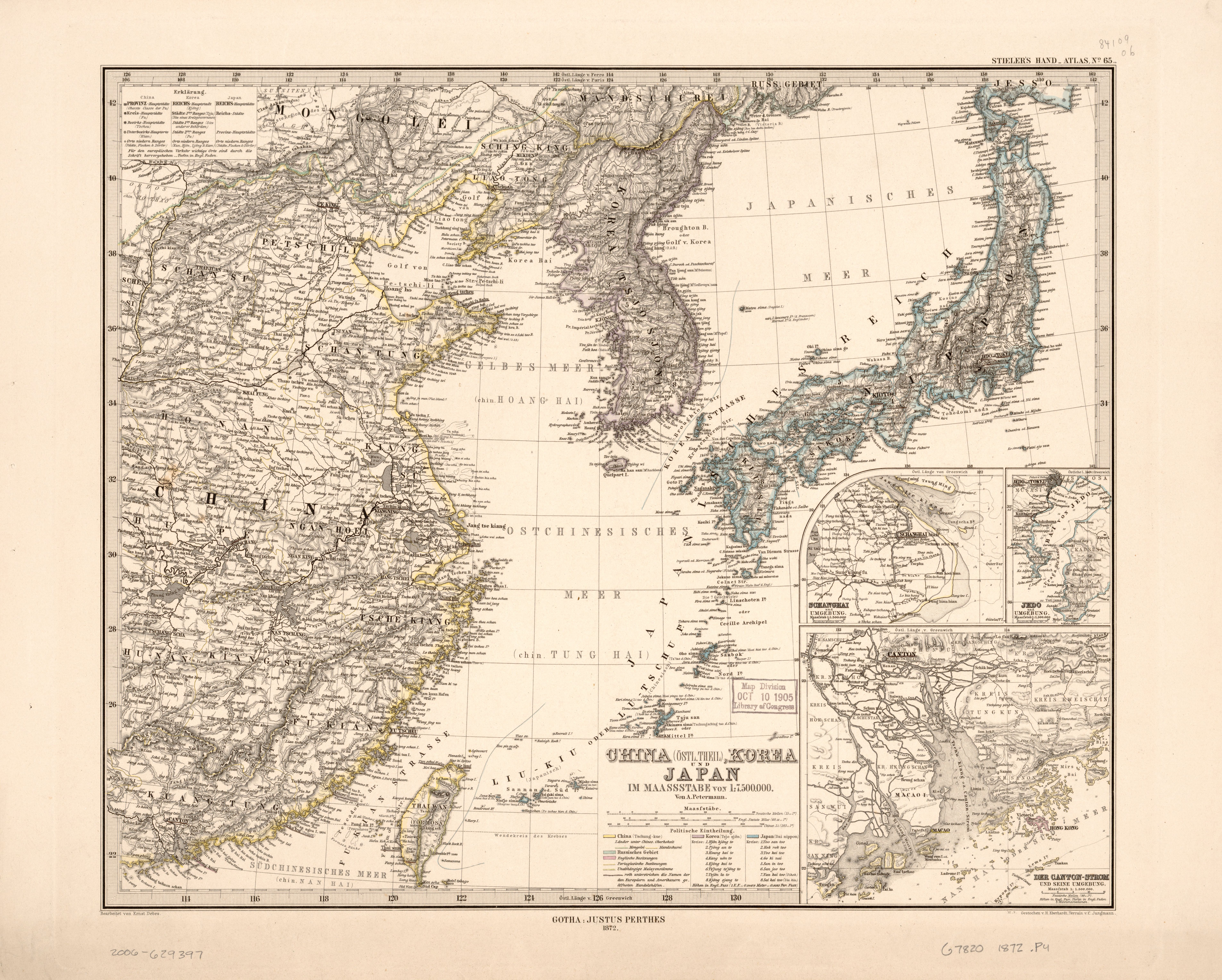
1872 map of China, Japan, and Korea

During the ship's first months in the region, Köhler continued to search for suitable locations for a future naval base; locations included Tsushima, Japan, and Daya Bay, Gulangyu, and Zhoushan, China. Hertha then sailed to Kagoshima, Japan, on 25 May, where she embarked Brandt and a representative of the Japanese government for a cruise to Nagasaki, Japan. Brandt and the government official left the ship there. Hertha then sailed on to Tsushima on 31 May. From there, she crossed the Sea of Japan to Busan, Korea, where Köhler negotiated with the Korean government for an agreement for treatment of German shipwrecks on Korean territory. Hertha then returned to Japan, anchoring at Shimonoseki, where Brandt came aboard once again. The ship returned to Yokosuka in mid-June for a major overhaul; soon thereafter, Medusa joined her there for repairs as well. In late July, Hertha sailed to Yantai, China, in response to civil unrest that involved the murder of French residents of the city; she arrived there on 31 July. A squadron of French warships consisting of a frigate, a corvette, an aviso, and five gunboats had assembled there to embark on a punitive expedition against the city.

==== Franco-Prussian War ====
On 8 August, Köhler received word that the Franco-Prussian War had broken out in Europe the previous month. That night, Hertha departed before the French squadron could attack her. Köhler hoped that he could rendezvous with Medusa, and that French attention would be divided between the already planned attack on Yantai and his ships, which would give German merchant vessels time to escape to neutral ports, where they would be safe from seizure. He also hoped to be able to catch detached French warships and defeat them in detail. After arriving in Nagasaki, a French frigate reached the port, which deprived Köhler of the element of surprise. Faced with the realization that he would not be able to carry out his plan, he negotiated with the French commander to secure a neutralization agreement, which would protect German merchant ships in the area, while also giving the French a free hand to deal with China over the incident in Yantai. Both sides' consuls agreed to the proposal, and no action would be taken against the other, pending official acceptance from their home governments. While still in Nagasaki, Köhler received orders from Berlin instructing him to begin operations against French merchant shipping, and to attack French warships if favorable situations arose. He then took Hertha to rendezvous with Medusa on 1 September, then still completing repairs at Yokosuka.

The governments of both Imperial France and the North German Confederation agreed to the neutrality agreement, but the fall of the imperial government and proclamation of the French Third Republic on 4 September quickly superseded the agreement. The French squadron, which now included an ironclad, followed Hertha to Yokohama in late September, and on the 29th, the French consul informed his German counterpart that the government had decided to postpone its reprisal on China in favor of destroying Hertha and Medusa. The delay nevertheless allowed around 200 German merchant vessels to reach the safety of neutral ports. Hertha and Medusa remained trapped by the vastly superior French squadron that patrolled outside the port, which at times included up to twenty-three warships. On 19 February 1871, news of the Armistice of Versailles ending the fighting arrived, but the French commander refused to abandon his blockade until 19 March, when he received official news that the war had ended.

After the war ended, Medusa was recalled home, leaving only Hertha on station in the region. An epidemic of smallpox broke out aboard the ship while she was in Shanghai; Hertha had to remain there while the men recuperated until 6 April. She then sailed to Yantai before she was ordered to continue on to cruise along the coast of Korea on 27 June in response to a conflict between Korean forces and United States' ships at Incheon. An American vessel had run aground there and been looted, as had a German sailing vessel, though only the Germans were able to gain satisfactory recompense from the Korean government. Hertha thereafter returned to Yantai, where she lay from 3 July to 29 September, before departing for Hong Kong to make preparations to return home. A typhoon delayed her arrival at Hong Kong until 10 October. Repairs for damage inflicted by the typhoon lasted for more than a month, and on 19 December, Hertha sailed from the port. She passed through Manila in the Spanish Philippines on the way to Singapore, which she reached on 26 January 1872. There, it was discovered she had broken her mizzenmast, which had to be replaced before she could continue onward. The ship returned to Yokohama to have the work done, and on 24 April, her replacement—the corvette Nymphe—arrived in Yokohama. Hertha eventually departed on 4 May, this time crossing the Pacific to San Francisco, United States; she was the first German warship to visit the city. Another stop at Callao, Peru, followed in response to internal unrest in the country. Hertha eventually arrived in Wilhelmshaven on 20 November and was decommissioned on 11 December.

=== 1873–1877 ===
Hertha next recommissioned on 16 April 1873 under the command of KK Paul von Reibnitz; the ship was now to serve as a training vessel for naval cadets. In early May, a dedicated training squadron was formed with Hertha as the flagship of Konteradmiral Ludwig von Henk. The other ships of the unit included her sisters Arcona and Vineta, the corvette Ariadne, and the gunboat Nautilus. Hertha, Ariadne, and the aviso Loreley conducted a mock battle for representatives from the Reichstag (Imperial Diet), who observed from the North German Lloyd steamer Mosel. On 10 June, the training squadron assembled in the western Baltic for exercises, but these were interrupted by the need to represent Germany at the coronation of King Oscar II of Sweden–Norway. The ships visited Trondheim and Oslo for the celebrations between 8 July and 12 August. The ships thereafter returned to training, but Hertha and Arcona collided, which caused a temporary pause until 20 August. Hertha was not damaged in the accident. With training complete by early September, the squadron was dissolved on the 11th and Hertha was decommissioned on 25 September for a major overhaul. This included replacing her engine and boilers with new-built models, which was in turn reused on the old artillery training ship Renown.

The ship returned to active service on 1 October 1874, now under the command of KK Eduard von Knorr, once again for training purposes. She sailed from Kiel on 28 October, embarking on a circumnavigation of the globe. She stopped in Portsmouth and the Isle of Wight on her way through the English Channel, and had reached Rio de Janeiro by 22 December; she stayed there until 5 January 1875. From there, she crossed the Atlantic and Indian Oceans, stopping in Anjer, Dutch East Indies, and then Singapore on 11 March. While there, Knorr met with Abu Bakar of Johor. Hertha then sailed to Victoria on the island of Labuan on 30 March. She passed through Manila on her way to Hong Kong, which she reached on 27 May; here, Knorr took command of the East Asia Squadron from Reibnitz, who was by then commander of Arcona. Hertha sailed on to Yokohama on 19 June and thereafter visited a number of ports in Japan. She returned to Yokohama for a major overhaul that lasted from 20 August to 18 December.

Beginning in 1874, Spain had instituted a policy of requiring foreign ships wishing to trade in the Caroline Islands to first receive approval from the colonial governor in Manila. Germany and Britain objected to this policy, since Spain did not actually control the islands. The protests led the Spanish government to tacitly approve traders from Germany and Britain to operate in the islands, but Hertha was sent there in early 1876 to investigate the situation. She returned to Yokohama on 12 March. By this time, piracy along the coast of China had become an increasingly severe problem, prmpting the German government to join efforts by Britain and Russia to suppress the pirates. Hertha, Ariadne, and the gunboat Cyclop met in Hong Kong to join the force assembled there, and on 6 June, Vineta arrived with KzS Alexander von Monts aboard; he relieved Knorr as commander of the squadron. Nautilus and the corvette Luise arrived later to further strengthen the German squadron. The international fleet pressured the Chinese government to take stronger action against the pirates and compensate shipping companies that had been attacked by the pirates. Hertha was therefore released from the squadron on 31 October.

Knorr, who had been promoted to kapitän zur see in March, was next ordered to take Hertha to Samoa and Tonga to negotiate trade agreements with their governments. The ship arrived in Apia, Samoa, in early October, where there was an on-going conflict between two factions. The Germans negotiated with both sides, but due to the expected length of discussions prompted the Germans to send a ship with a new cohort of naval cadets, which were exchanged with the old class in Apia that month. In late October, Hertha sailed to Nukuʻalofa, the Tongan capital on the island of Tongatapu. On 1 November, Knorr concluded a treaty of friendship with the Tongan government that included provisions to consider Germany a most favored nation for trading purposes, along with the establishment of a coaling station in the islands. The ship thereafter returned to Apia on 10 December to resume negotiations, though he departed later that month for Auckland, New Zealand, which she reached on 24 December. There, the crew received and sent messages home, made repairs to the ship, and replenished supplies. Hertha also received orders to return home. Before Hertha began the voyage home, she sailed back to Apia in early January 1877 to conclude negotiations with the two factions there. While a final agreement could not be obtained due to the political instability there, both sides agreed to avoid attacking the foreign settlement in Apia. Hertha thereafter returned to Auckland, from which she sailed for home on 16 March. Stops along the way included Aden, Port Said, Valetta, and Portsmouth. On 27 July, the ship reached Kiel, where she was decommissioned on 10 August.

=== Later operations ===
Hertha was recommissioned just eight days later on 18 August, under the command of KK Johann-Heinrich Pirner, for a deployment to the Mediterranean in response to the Russo-Turkish War that had broken out earlier that year. Hertha was to replace the armored training squadron that had been sent to the eastern Mediterranean to protect German interests in the region; she would be joined there by Gazelle, the gunboats Albatross and Comet, and the aviso Pommerania. Now-Kommodore (Commodore) Kinderling came aboard Hertha to serve as the squadron commander. Hertha got underway on 6 September, and arrived in Valletta on 3 October. She was soon joined by Gazelle, and the two ships departed for Smyrna in the Ottoman Empire, arriving on 12 October. The ships of the squadron patrolled the region until the Treaty of San Stefano ended the war on 3 March 1878; at that time, the squadron was disbanded and the ships dispersed. Hertha was ordered home on 1 June, and she arrived in Kiel on 5 July. She was decommissioned on 19 July for an extensive overhaul.

KzS Philipp von Kall took command of Hertha when she was recommissioned on 1 October 1880 for training duties. She sailed from Kiel on 17 October, but a severe storm in the North Sea forced her to stop in Plymouth for repairs to her rigging. This delayed further progress until 17 November, when she resumed the voyage to the Pacific Ocean. After stops in Funchal, Madeira, and Cape Town, she arrived in Melbourne, Australia, on 10 March 1881. While on the way, the crew discovered her fore mast was cracked, and had to make temporary repairs. There, she represented Germany at the Melbourne International Exhibition, along with the gunboats Habicht and Möwe. In the meantime, the navy ordered a replacement mast from a manufacturer in San Francisco. In late March, the three ships departed for Samoa, and on reaching Apia, they met the gunboat Hyäne. The German consul in the region, Otto Zembsch, boarded Hertha in Apia for a visit to the Marshall Islands, departing on 2 May and arriving in Jaluit on 17 May. Zembsch left the ship there, and Hertha sailed on to Yokohama, Japan, on 12 June. While in Yokohama, she had the new foremast installed, which was completed by 25 August.

Hertha then cruised in the Seto Inland Sea, where she weathered a typhoon on 3 September, and visited Kobe and Shimonoseki, after which she crossed over to Yantai, China. She then participated in squadron exercises with the vessels of the East Asia Squadron, then led by the corvette Stosch. Hertha then sailed on independently, visiting a number of Chinese ports, including Xiamen in early December. A German barque had run aground there recently, and the local populace had begun looting the wreck; Hertha sent an armed cutter to stop the theft, and she forced the local government to pay restitution to the ship's owners. She then returned to Japan, stopping in Nagasaki on 15 January 1882. Another cruise through Japanese waters followed until 17 March, when she arrived in Yokohama to receive orders to return home. Hertha's route to Germany took her to Hong Kong, Manila, Singapore, and initially to Zanzibar, where Kall met with Sultan Barghash bin Said of Zanzibar in June. While in Simon Town, South Africa, Hertha received instructions to sail to Dahomey to respond to a Bremen-flagged barque that had been attacked by the local residents, though the situation had been resolved by the time she arrived. She then toured several ports on the western coast of Africa and eventually reached Kiel on 29 October. The ship was decommissioned there for the last time on 22 November. Found to be in poor condition after many years abroad, Hertha was struck from the naval register on 12 August 1884. She was partially scrapped down to her battery deck, and then used as a coal storage hulk until 1902, when she was sold to ship breakers in Swinemünde.
