= Nymphe-class corvette =

Screw corvette of the Prussian and German Imperial Navy

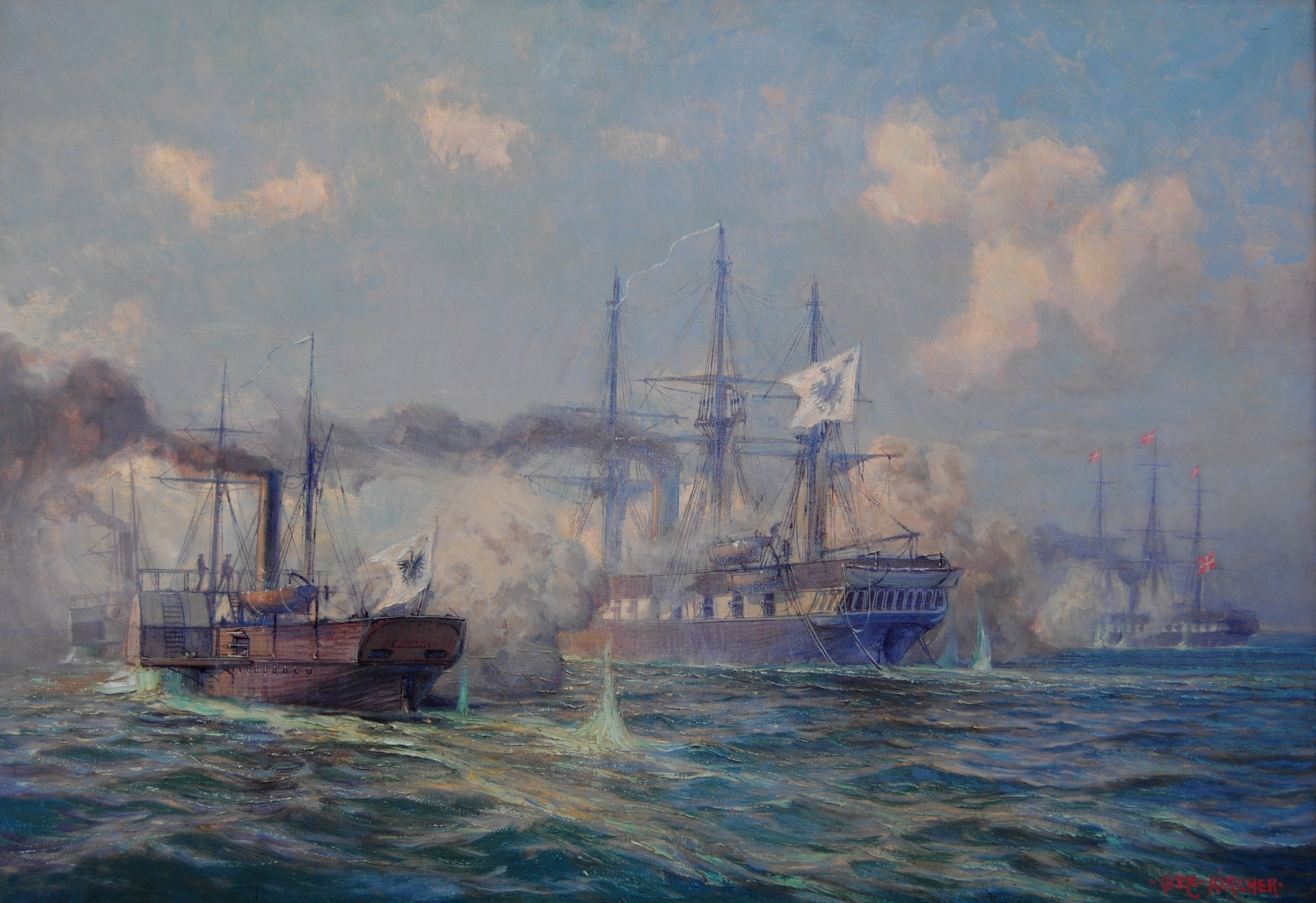
- Nymphe, center, at the Battle of Jasmund, battling the Danish frigate Sjælland (right background)

Class overview
- Builders: Königliche Werft, Danzig
- Preceded by: None
- Succeeded by: Augusta-class corvette
- Built: 1862–1867
- In service: 1864–1887
- Completed: 2
- Scrapped: 2

General characteristics
- Type: Screw corvette
- Displacement: Full load: 1,202 metric tons (1,183 long tons)
- Length: 64.9 m (212 ft 11 in) (loa)
- Beam: 10.2 m (33 ft 6 in)
- Draft: 3.92 m (12 ft 10 in) (forward)
- Installed power: 4 × fire-tube boilers; 800 metric horsepower (790 ihp)
- Propulsion: 1 × marine steam engine; 1 × screw propeller
- Speed: 12 knots (22 km/h; 14 mph)
- Range: 1,250 nautical miles (2,320 km; 1,440 mi) at 12 knots (22 km/h; 14 mph)
- Crew: 14 officers; 176 sailors
- Armament: 10 × 36-pounder guns; 6 × 12-pounder guns

The Nymphe class of screw corvettes were the first vessels of the type to be built for the Prussian Navy in the early 1860s. The class comprised two vessels, Nymphe and Medusa. The ships were laid down in early 1862, and Nymphe was completed by late 1863, but work on Medusa proceeded slower, owing to budgetary disputes with the Prussian parliament and a desire to use experience in building Nymphe during the former's construction. The ships were built as part of a naval expansion program aimed at countering the powerful Danish Navy in the context of the disputed ownership of Schleswig and Holstein. The ships were armed with a battery of sixteen guns, and were capable of a top speed of 12 knots (22 km/h; 14 mph) under steam power. All of the material used in their construction was domestically produced, apart from the propulsion system, which was imported from Great Britain.

Nymphe was completed in time to see action during the Second Schleswig War with Denmark in 1864, at the Battle of Jasmund, where she was heavily engaged by a Danish steam frigate, being hit numerous times. Medusa entered service in 1867 and went on a deployment to the Mediterranean Sea in 1867–1868 and another cruise to East Asia in 1868–1871. During the Franco-Prussian War in 1870–1871, Medusa was blockaded in Yokohama, Japan, and saw no action. Nymphe was similarly blockaded in Danzig, Prussia, and she made a surprise nighttime attack on the French squadron, inflicting no damage but nevertheless convincing the French admiral that his ironclad warships were unsuitable for a close blockade of Prussian ports.

Nymphe went on a cruise to East Asia in 1871–1874, while Medusa was converted into a training ship in 1872. Nymphe was similarly converted when she returned from Asian waters, and both ships served in this capacity for the next several years. They went on training cruises to the Americas and the Mediterranean. Medusa was worn out by 1880 and was removed from service, though Nymphe continued to operate until 1885, when she too was withdrawn. Both ships were hulked after being decommissioned and they were both retained until 1891, when they were broken up.

== Design ==
In the mid-1800s, as navies began to embark on ironclad warship construction programs, the Prussian Navy determined that unarmored screw corvettes were still necessary for its responsibility to protect overseas economic interests. Design work on the Arcona-class frigates had begun in 1854, and the navy decided that smaller vessels would also be useful, and so the construction department began work on the new design in 1861. At the time, the American Civil War had recently broken out, and the Confederate use of privateers would prove to be a significant threat to neutral shipping. As a result, Prussia would need long-range cruising vessels to protect its merchant vessels in addition to other normal cruiser duties like showing the flag and attacking enemy shipping.

The Nymphe class of screw corvettes were ordered in the context of a pair of crises confronting the Kingdom of Prussia. Denmark started to expand its naval forces in 1861, prompting fears that the small Prussian fleet would be hopelessly outclassed if the Danes attempted to settle the Schleswig–Holstein question by force. In March that year, the naval minister Albrecht von Roon, who was also the Prussian Ministry of War, issued a fleet plan that called for twelve screw corvettes in addition to a host of other vessels as part of a program to prepare for a likely conflict with Denmark. The second problem was a constitutional crisis in Prussia over Roon's plan to expand and reform the Prussian Army. Widespread animosity toward him in the Landtag (State Diet) caused the parliament to refuse to allocate funds for the program. The Prussian Navy operated without a legal budget, however, and ordered the two Nymphe-class ships regardless on 23 July. Prussia would be able to supply all of the materials necessary for the ships, apart from the engines, which would have to be ordered abroad.

=== Characteristics ===
The ships of the Nymphe class were 58.54 meters (192 ft 1 in) long at the waterline and were 64.9 m (212 ft 11 in) long overall. They had a beam of 10.2 m (33 ft 6 in) and a draft of 3.92 m (12 ft 10 in) forward and 4.47 m (14 ft 8 in) aft. They displaced 1,085 metric tons (1,068 long tons) as designed and up to 1,202 t (1,183 long tons) at full load. Their hulls were of timber construction, with transverse frames. The outer hull was carvel built and was sheathed in copper to protect the wood from biofouling on extended cruises abroad, where routine maintenance could not be carried out.

The ship's crew consisted of 14 officers and 176 enlisted men. They carried four boats, one large and three small, of unrecorded type. The ships were good sea boats and they sailed well, unlike most of the other screw corvettes built by Prussia and the later unified Germany. Carrying ballast in the stern improved their sailing characteristics further, as did sailing in a beam sea. They lost considerable speed steaming in a head sea and they were not particularly maneuverable, though they performed better in this capacity under steam than under sail. Steering was controlled with a single rudder.

=== Machinery ===
The ships were powered by a single horizontal, 2-cylinder marine steam engine that drove a 2-bladed screw propeller that was 3.64 m (11 ft 11 in) in diameter. Steam was provided by two coal-fired fire-tube boilers manufactured by J Penn & Sons of Greenwich, which were ducted into a single retractable funnel. Their propulsion system gave the ships a top speed of 12 knots (22 km/h; 14 mph) at 800 metric horsepower (790 ihp). Coal storage amounted to 126 t (124 long tons). They had a cruising radius of 1,250 nautical miles (2,320 km; 1,440 mi) at a speed of 12 knots (22 km/h; 14 mph). Nymphe and Medusa were equipped with a full ship rig to supplement their steam engine.

=== Armament ===
Nymphe and Medusa were armed with a battery of ten 36-pounder guns and six 12-pounder guns, all of which were muzzleloading guns mounted on the broadside. In 1869, these guns were replaced with seventeen, and later nineteen, 12 cm (4.7 in) 23-caliber breechloading, built-up guns. These guns were supplied with 1,900 rounds of ammunition, and they had a range of 5,900 m (6,500 yd). Later in their careers, these were reduced to nine guns.

== Ships ==
Construction data
Ship	Builder	Laid down	Launched	Completed
Nymphe	Königliche Werft, Danzig	25 January 1862	15 April 1863	25 November 1863
Medusa	Königliche Werft, Danzig	6 February 1862	20 October 1864	10 April 1867

== Service history ==
=== Nymphe ===
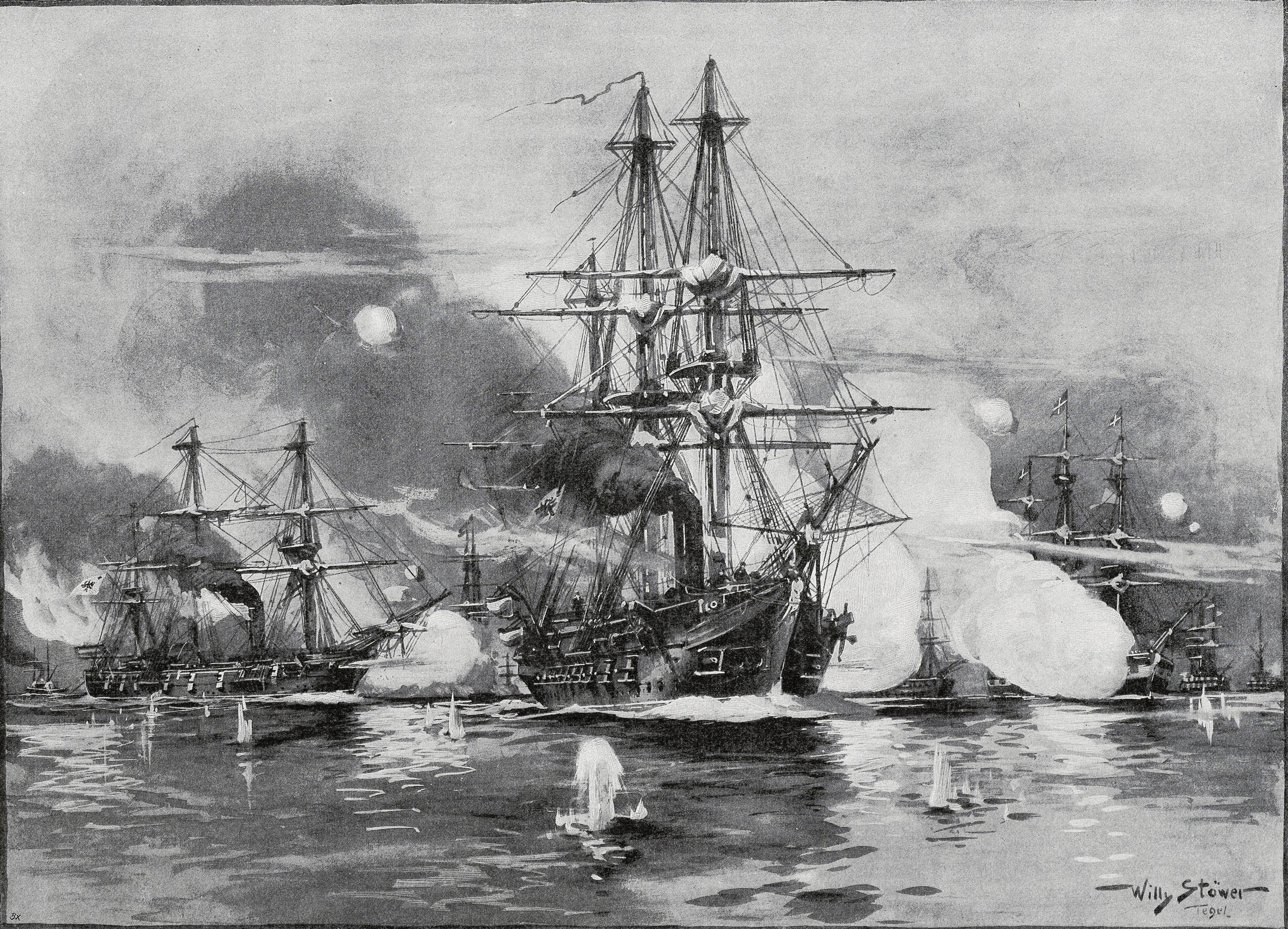
Painting of the Battle of Jasmund, depicting the Prussian squadron, by Willy Stöwer

Nymphe saw action during the Second Schleswig War against Denmark in 1864, and took part in the largest action in the Baltic during the war, the Battle of Jasmund. She and the frigate Arcona sortied to attack the Danish blockade, and in the ensuing action, Nymphe was heavily engaged by the Danish frigate Sjælland, and she received around 70 hits, mostly to her rigging, though she was not seriously damaged and casualties were light. The ship was in the process of being recalled to Germany during the Austro-Prussian War in 1866, and as a result, saw no action during the conflict, but she did see battle with French warships during the Franco-Prussian War in 1870. A French squadron of ironclads had anchored off Danzig, and Nymphe launched a surprise night attack on the idle vessels, though she inflicted no serious damage on the armored vessels. Her attack nevertheless convinced the French admiral, Édouard Bouët-Willaumez, that his heavy ships were not useful in a close blockade of German ports, and so they left.

In 1871, Nymphe embarked on a major overseas deployment to the Pacific Ocean and East Asia; while on the way, her crew caused a minor diplomatic incident with Brazil. While on the East Asia station, the ship's captain, Louis von Blanc, conducted negotiations the governments of islands in Oceania, Borneo, and the Sulu Archipelago. She also toured numerous cities to show the flag and searched unsuccessfully for a place to create a coaling station for German ships. She remained abroad until mid-1874, after which she was converted into a training ship for apprentice seamen. She served in that capacity for the next decade, during which she conducted training cruises, usually to the Americas, though in 1882 she toured the Mediterranean Sea, in part to strengthen German naval forces in the region during the 'Urabi revolt in Egypt. In poor condition and in need of a complete reconstruction by 1885, she was stricken from the naval register in July 1887 and hulked. Nymphe was ultimately sold in 1891 and broken up in Hamburg.

=== Medusa ===
Medusa went on two major overseas cruises during her career, the first to the Mediterranean Sea in 1867–1868 during the Cretan Revolt against Ottoman rule. She did not actively intervene in the conflict, and in 1868 she carried the squadron commander to visit the Ottoman government in Constantinople. The second, lengthier voyage lasted from 1868 to 1871, and centered on operations in East Asia. There, like Nymphe, she searched for a coaling station without success. She also protected German citizens in Japan during the final stage of the Boshin War and was damaged in a typhoon off the Japanese coast. After being repaired, she helped to suppress Chinese pirates and visited numerous ports to show the flag. After the outbreak of the Franco-Prussian War in 1870, Medusa was trapped in Yokohama, Japan, by a French squadron blockading the port; as a result, she saw no action during the conflict, but she acted as a fleet in being that tied up the French warships and prevented them from attacking German merchant shipping.

After returning to unified Germany in 1872, Medusa was converted into a training ship, a role she filled for the next eight years. During this period, she went on a number of training cruises, both in the Baltic Sea and longer voyages to North, Central, and South America, as well as the Mediterranean. She surreptitiously went to the Mediterranean to monitor tensions in the Balkans in 1876 and helped to secure restitution for the murder of a German diplomat in Salonika. Worn out by 1880 and in need of a thorough overhaul, the navy instead decided to remove the ship from service, using her as a hulk until 1891, when she was sold for scrap.
