= Arcona-class frigate =

Prussian Navy class of vessels

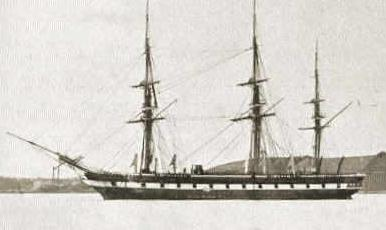
- Arcona at anchor

Class overview
- Builders: Königliche Werft, Danzig
- Preceded by: Thetis class
- Succeeded by: None
- Built: 1855–1869
- In service: 1859–1904
- Completed: 5
- Scrapped: 5

General characteristics
- Type: Steam frigate
- Displacement: 2,391 t (2,353 long tons)
- Length: 71.95 m (236 ft 1 in)
- Beam: 13 m (42 ft 8 in)
- Draft: 5.55 m (18 ft 3 in)
- Installed power: 4 × fire-tube boilers; 1,365 PS (1,346 ihp)
- Propulsion: 1 × marine steam engine; 1 × screw propeller
- Sail plan: Full-rigged ship
- Speed: 12.4 knots (23.0 km/h; 14.3 mph)
- Range: 1,150 nmi (2,130 km; 1,320 mi) at 11 knots (20 km/h; 13 mph)
- Complement: 35 officers; 345 enlisted men
- Armament: 6 × 68-pounder guns; 20 × 36 pounder guns
- Notes: (Note: Figures are for Arcona)

The Arcona class of steam frigates was a class of five vessels built for the Prussian Navy in the late 1850s and 1860s. The class comprised Arcona, Gazelle, Vineta, Hertha, and Elisabeth. The Arconas were the first major steam-powered warships ordered for the Prussian Navy. The ships were ordered as part of a major construction program to strengthen the nascent Prussian fleet, under the direction of Prince Adalbert, and were intended to provide defense against the Royal Danish Navy. The ships were armed with a battery of twenty-six or twenty-eight guns, and were capable of steaming at a speeds of between 11.5 and 12.4 knots (21.3 and 23.0 km/h; 13.2 and 14.3 mph).

== Design ==
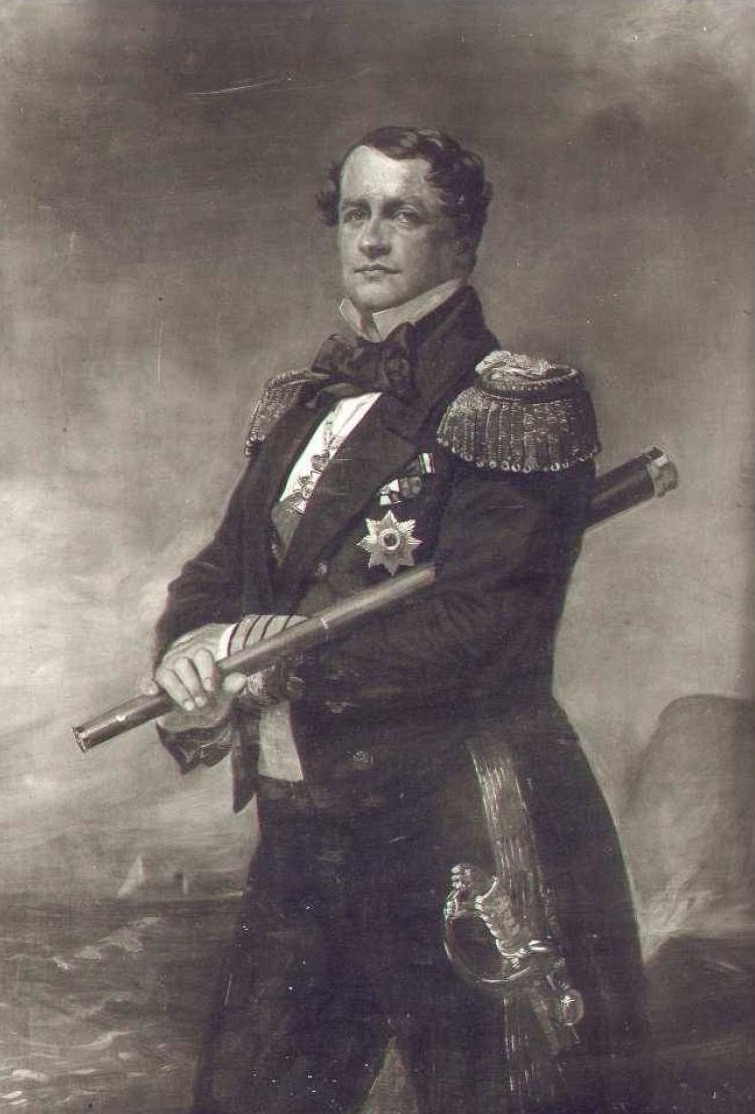
Prince Adalbert, the primary proponent of Prussian naval expansion

In the immediate aftermath of the First Schleswig War against Denmark, Prince Adalbert began drawing up plans for the future of the Prussian Navy; the war with Denmark made clear the need for a larger fleet to guard the Prussian coast and defend maritime trade. He also sought vessels capable of power projection beyond the Baltic Sea. Toward the latter end, he secured the Jade Treaty in 1853 that saw the port of Wilhelmshaven transferred to Prussia from the Duchy of Oldenburg. Wilhelmshaven would be expanded into a naval base for the Prussian fleet on the North Sea. At the same time, on 14 November, Adalbert's cousin, King Friedrich Wilhelm, ordered the creation of the Prussian Admiralty. The organization was nominally run by Otto Theodor von Manteuffel, the Minister President of Prussia, but it was in reality actually controlled by Adalbert.

In late 1854, the Admiralty issued a memorandum laying out its vision for expansion of the fleet. The document contained general principles—such as a desire to keep distinct ship classes to a minimum and a preference for experience from foreign navies—as well as specific requirements, including requirements for steam power and reduced draft to permit operations in the shallow Baltic. In April 1855, the Admiralty presented its plan, which laid its objectives at creating a navy directed against Denmark, Prussia's principal enemy at sea. In the plan, Adalbert called for a force of three screw frigates and six screw corvettes, which Friedrich Wilhelm approved on 19 April. The first question that confronted the naval leadership was whether to purchase vessels from foreign builders or to design the new ships domestically. Up to that point, Prussia had largely acquired warships from British shipyards, beginning with the Nix-class avisos in 1851.

Already in 1851, during negotiations over the Nix class with their British builder, the Prussians had inquired about the construction of a 60-gun frigate. The proposal came to nothing, as the Landtag of Prussia refused to appropriate funding for the project. The navy raised the proposal again in 1854, citing the severe shortage of ships, but they instead requested a pair of 40-gun frigates. The king approved the plan, and the navy sent the shipwright Felix Devrient and draftsman Theophile Guyot to Britain to gather information and prepare designs for the frigate and a smaller corvette. Devrient produced proposals for a 41-gun frigate and 24-gun corvette in September 1854, though Adalbert rejected both and ordered a new competition for a 26-gun corvette.

In October 1854, the Swede Johan Gjerling became Prussia's chief naval constructor, and his proposal was ultimately selected the following year. Devrient had been sent to Britain and France to present the various proposals for evaluation by their experienced naval officers, but both countries' officers refused to assist because Prussia had chosen to remain neutral during the Crimean War. Two ships were authorized on 2 November 1855. Gjerling resigned from the project in June 1856 over dissatisfaction with the navy's requests to modify aspects of the design. This left the task of completing the ship to Carl Elbertzhagen, who replaced him as the navy's chief constructor. Elbertzhagen needed to make a series of alterations to the plans for the ship, including some significant details that had not been sketched by Gjerling at all, including the shape of the stern or the size of propeller to be fitted. By May 1857, the design work had been completed.

A further pair was ordered in June 1860, and the final member of the class was ordered in February 1866. Elbertzhagen made a number of alterations to the basic design for the second pair of ships; their hulls were lengthened to provide more coal storage space, which gave him more room to refine their lines and thereby improve their hydrodynamic performance. For the final member of the class, Adalbert hoped to replace her altogether with an ironclad warship, but there was no available design and the shipyard in Danzig was incapable of building a larger vessel anyway. So another Arcona-class frigate was ordered, albeit slightly increased in size over the second pair. With even finer lines, this ship—Elisabeth—had the highest design speed of the class.

=== General characteristics ===
The ships of the class varied slightly in dimensions. Arcona and Gazelle were 63.55 meters (208 ft 6 in) long at the waterline and 71.95 m (236 ft 1 in) long overall. They had a beam of 13 m (42 ft 8 in) and a draft of 5.55 m (18 ft 3 in) forward, which increased to 6.35 m (20 ft 10 in) aft. They displaced 1,928 metric tons (1,898 long tons) as designed and 2,391 t (2,353 long tons) at full load. Vineta and Hertha were slightly longer, at 65.5 m (214 ft 11 in) at the waterline and 73.32 m (240 ft 7 in) overall; their fore and aft draft measured 5.52 and 6.53 m (18 ft 1 in and 21 ft 5 in), respectively. Their displacement increased slightly, to 2,113 t (2,080 long tons) normally and 2,504 t (2,464 long tons) at full load. Elisabeth was the largest of the ships, being 71.5 m (234 ft 7 in) at the waterline and 79.3 m (260 ft 2 in) overall, with a beam of 13.2 m (43 ft 4 in) and a draft of 5.5 and 6.4 m (18 ft 1 in and 21 ft 0 in) forward and aft.

The ships had short forecastle and sterncastle decks, and the first four vessels had a transom stern. They were constructed using transverse oak frames, with a carvel-built outer hull. Their superstructure consisted primarily of a small deckhouse aft. Steering was controlled via a single rudder. The ships were very maneuverable under sail, and they were excellent sea boats. While steaming into a head sea, they tended to lose speed significantly, however. They had a crew of 35 officers and 345 enlisted men. Each ship carried a number of smaller boats, including one launch, two pinnaces, one cutter, one yawl, and two dinghies.

=== Propulsion system ===
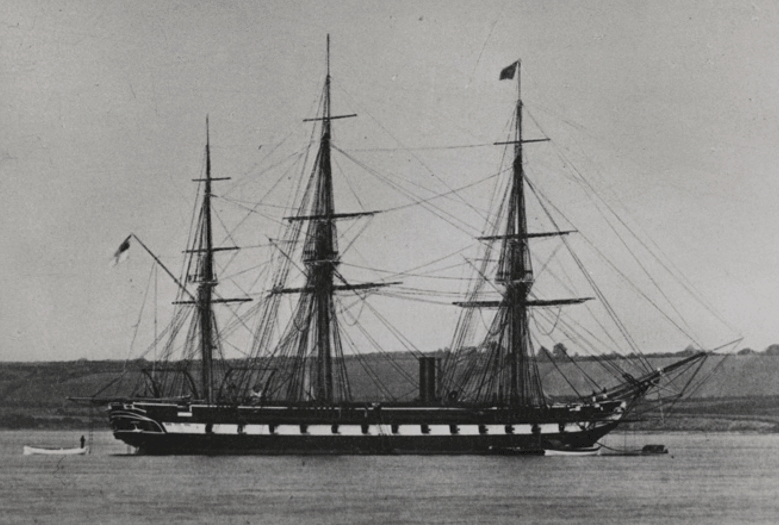
Gazelle at anchor

The ships' propulsion system consisted of a single horizontal single-expansion steam engine driving a single screw propeller; all of the ships except Gazelle received engines manufactured in Britain, while that vessel had a domestically produced engine installed. Gazelle's engine proved to be troublesome throughout her career. Steam was supplied by four coal-burning fire-tube boilers. Exhaust was vented through a single funnel located amidships. To supplement the steam engine on long voyages abroad, they carried a three-masted full-ship rig with a total surface area of 2,200 m^{2} (24,000 sq ft). The screw could be retracted while cruising under sail.

The first four members of the Arcona class were rated to steam at a top speed of 8 knots (15 km/h; 9.2 mph), while Elisabeth was projected to reach 9 knots (17 km/h; 10 mph), but all of the ships significantly exceeded their estimated speeds, reaching 11.5 to 12.4 knots (21.3 to 23.0 km/h; 13.2 to 14.3 mph) from 1,320 to 2,440 metric horsepower (1,300 to 2,410 ihp). The ships carried between 150 and 240 t (150 and 240 long tons) of coal for their boilers. Arcona and Hertha had a cruising radius of about 1,150 nautical miles (2,130 km; 1,320 mi) at a speed of 11 knots (20 km/h; 13 mph), while Vineta and Hertha were capable of steaming for 1,350 nmi (2,500 km; 1,550 mi) at the same speed. Elisabeth could cruise for 1,900 nmi (3,500 km; 2,200 mi) at 10 knots (19 km/h; 12 mph).

=== Armament ===
Arcona and Gazelle were armed with a battery of six 68-pounder guns and twenty 36-pounder guns. By 1870, they had been rearmed with a uniform battery of seventeen 15 cm (5.9 in) RK L/22 guns; later in her career, the number of these guns was reduced to eight. Vineta, Hertha, and Elisabeth were completed with a uniform battery of twenty-eight of the 68-pounder guns, which they carried until 1869, when they, too, were rearmed with 15 cm RK L/22 guns, receiving seventeen or nineteen of the guns. Vineta and Hertha also received a pair of 12.5 cm (4.9 in) K L/23 guns at that time.

== Ships ==
Hertha in port, date unknown

Construction data
Ship	Builder	Laid down	Launched	Completed
Arcona	Königliche Werft, Danzig	3 December 1854 (Note: According to Dirk Nottelmann, no definitive record of the ship's keel laying is known to exist, but the available evidence suggests work began the same day as Gazelle.)	19 May 1858	15 April 1859
Gazelle	Königliche Werft, Danzig	3 December 1854	12 December 1859	15 May 1862
Vineta	Königliche Werft, Danzig	17 September 1860	3 June 1863	3 March 1864
Hertha	Königliche Werft, Danzig	1 September 1860	1 October 1864	1 November 1865
Elisabeth	Königliche Werft, Danzig	1 May 1866	18 October 1868	29 September 1869

== Service history ==
=== Arcona ===
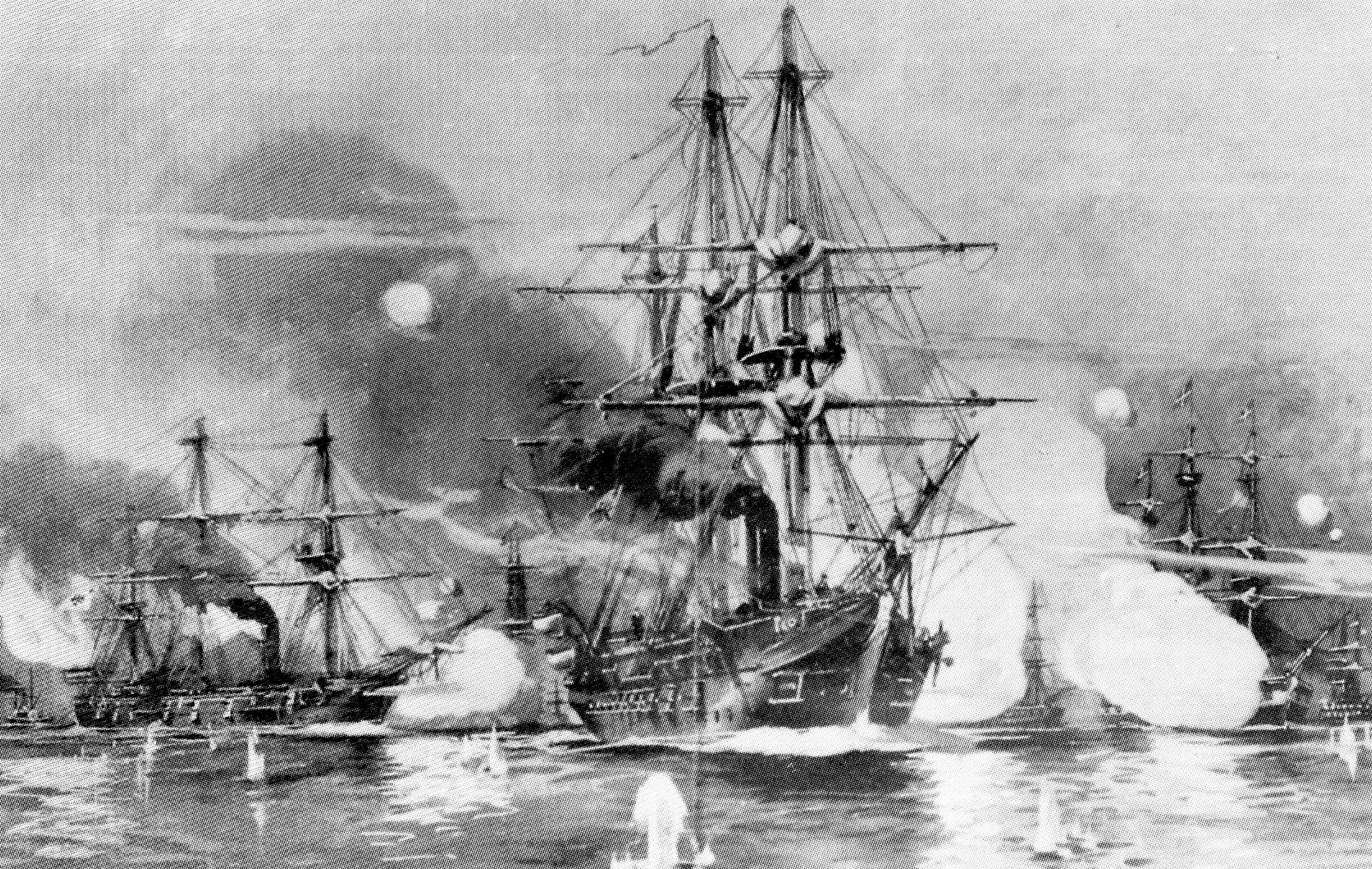
Arcona leading the Prussian squadron at the Battle of Jasmund

Arcona spent the first two years of her career leading the Eulenburg expedition as the squadron flagship; the mission took the ship to East Asia to support diplomatic efforts with the Kingdom of Siam, Qing China, and Tokugawa Japan. Arcona next saw service during the Second Schleswig War in 1864, once again serving as the flagship of a squadron led by Eduard von Jachmann, which briefly engaged the Danish Navy in the Battle of Jasmund in March. She saw no action during the Austro-Prussian War in 1866, as the Austrian Navy remained in the Adriatic Sea during the short conflict. The ship passed into the service of the North German Federal Navy, which was created by the Prussian-dominated North German Confederation after their victory in the war with Austria.

The ship embarked on another major overseas cruise in 1869, this time to the eastern Mediterranean Sea for the opening ceremonies of the Suez Canal, followed by a cruise in the Caribbean Sea. She was still there when the Franco-Prussian War broke out in July 1870, and she soon stopped in the neutral Azores, where she remained safe from blockading French warships; she sailed to Portugal in November, where the French pursued and trapped her until the end of the war in January 1871. Arcona passed into the service of a third German navy, the Kaiserliche Marine (Imperial Navy) of the new German Empire. She made another major overseas voyage from 1873 to 1875, visiting East Asia and North and South America. The ship was used for limited training duties in the late 1870s and early 1880s, but her poor condition led to her being struck from the naval register in 1884. Briefly used as a target ship, she was broken up soon thereafter.

=== Gazelle ===
Gazelle's first major operation began in late 1862, when she was chosen to carry the ratified treaties with Japan and China that had been concluded by the Eulenburg expedition. While in the latter country in early 1864, the Second Schleswig War had broken out, and Gazelle attacked Danish merchant shipping in Asia, capturing four prizes before the war ended. She eventually arrived home in 1865. Gazelle was mobilized during the Austro-Prussian War of 1866, but saw no action during the short conflict that resulted in the creation of the Prussian-dominated North German Confederation. She cruised in the Mediterranean Sea on a training voyage for naval cadets in 1866–1867, now a warship of the North German Federal Navy.

Gazelle was not recommissioned during the Franco-Prussian War, owing to the vast superiority of the French fleet. Now in the service of the Kaiserliche Marine, Gazelle made a cruise to the Caribbean Sea from 1871 to 1873, sailing alone, at times with her sister ship Vineta, and ending the voyage with a larger squadron. From 1874 to 1876, Gazelle embarked on a major overseas voyage for scientific purposes, including part of Germany's observation of the 1874 transit of Venus. The scientific team aboard the ship also conducted ethnographic, zoological, and oceanographic research during the cruise. Gazelle was sent to the Mediterranean in 1877 in response to heightened tensions that eventually resulted in the outbreak of the Russo-Turkish War in 1878. The ship saw limited service in the late 1870s and early 1880s, primarily as a training ship, before being struck from the naval register in 1884. She was used as a barracks ship until 1906, when she was sold to ship breakers.

=== Vineta ===
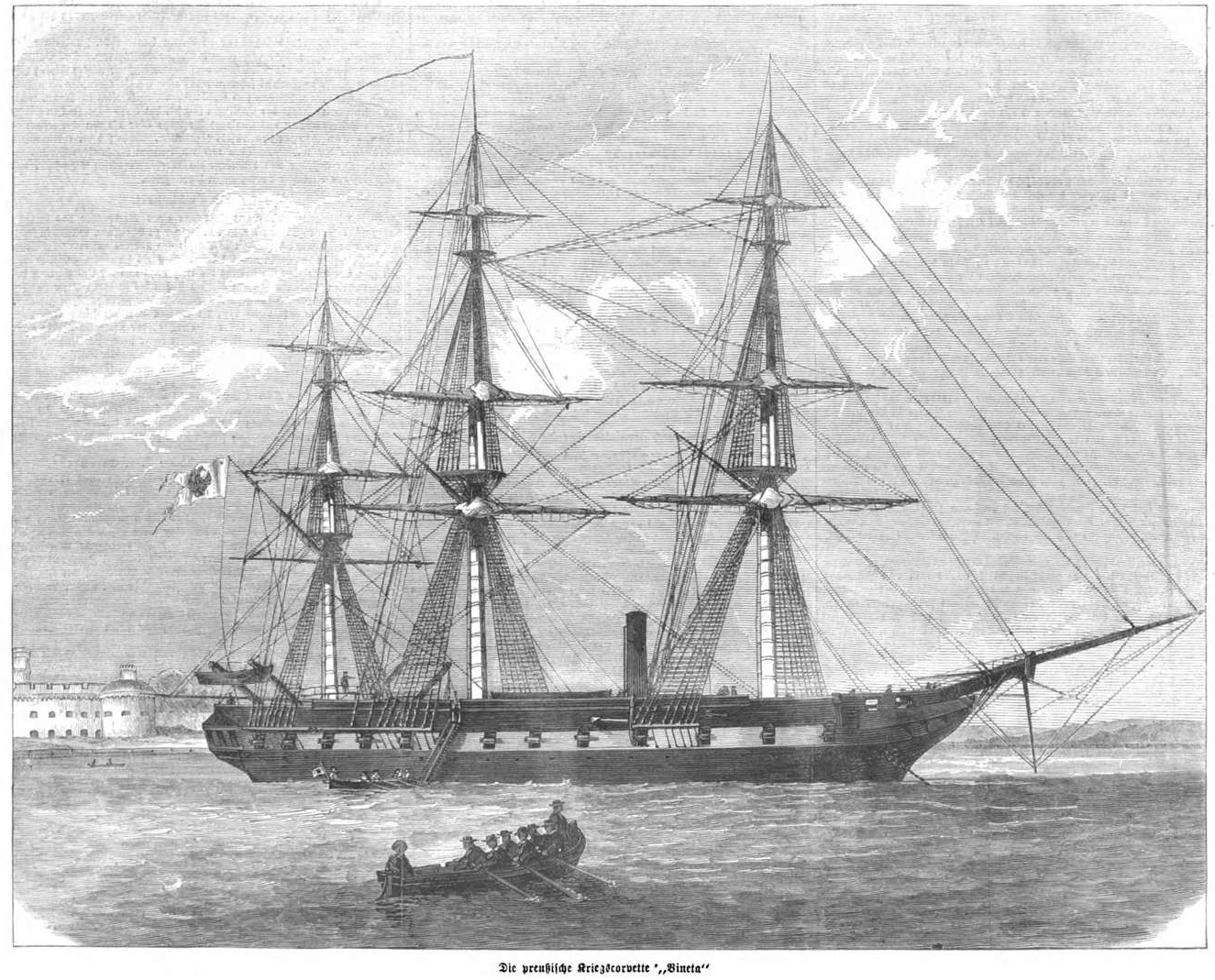
Sketch of Vineta

Completion of Vineta was rushed in early 1864 in the run up to the Second Schleswig War; the ship was still not complete at the start of the war, and so only saw brief action as a guard ship at Danzig. Vineta embarked on a major overseas voyage from 1865 to 1868, which saw the ship complete the first circumnavigation of the globe by a Prussian warship. The ship was again used as a guard ship at Friedrichsort during the Franco-Prussian War, but did not see action.

Vineta spent much of the 1870s abroad on a series of extended voyages. The first, from 1871 to 1873, took the ship to the Americas, where she intervened in a dispute between German merchants and the Haitian government. She also visited a number of ports in South and North America. The second, from 1875 to 1877, saw the ship deployed to East Asia. While there in 1876, she was part of the Anglo-German naval demonstration that resulted in the Chefoo Convention, an unequal treaty with Qing China. Her final voyage abroad began in 1879 and concluded in 1881; this time, her activities in Asian waters were less eventful. Vineta was used intermittently for training duties in the early 1880s before being struck from the naval register in 1884. Employed as a stationary training ship from 1884 to 1897, she was then broken up in Kiel.

=== Hertha ===
Hertha was activated during the Austro-Prussian War in 1866, but saw no action during the brief conflict. Next reactivated in 1867 into what was now the North German Federal Navy, Hertha made a cruise to the Mediterranean Sea that concluded in 1868. During the voyage, her crew assisted in the recovery of the grounded French corvette Roland. Hertha next returned to the Mediterranean in 1869 for the opening ceremonies of the Suez Canal, after which she sailed on for a tour of East Asia. She was still there in mid-1870 when the Franco-Prussian War broke out. Hertha was quickly trapped in Yokohama, Japan, along with the corvette Medusa, by superior French naval forces. As a result, she saw no action during that war. She returned home after the war ended in 1871.

Hertha went another major overseas cruise in 1874 for a circumnavigation of the globe, during which she spent a significant amount of time in East Asia and the central Pacific Ocean. There, her captain, Eduard von Knorr, negotiated trade agreements with Tonga and Samoa before returning to Germany in mid-1877. A shorter cruise in the Mediterranean followed from mid-1877 to early 1878. In late 1880, she embarked on her last major overseas voyage, which again took the ship to East Asia and the Pacific. The voyage concluded with a cruise around Africa, after which Hertha returned to Germany in late 1882. She was struck from the naval register in 1884, converted into a coal storage hulk, and used in that capacity until 1902, when she was broken up.

=== Elisabeth ===
Elisabeth, in Xiamen, China, in the 1870s

Elisabeth joined a squadron that was sent to the Mediterranean Sea for the opening ceremonies for the Suez Canal in late 1869. She was activated during the Franco-Prussian War of 1870–1871, first as a guard ship during the French blockade of the North German coast. Plans to deploy the ship as a commerce raider later in the war came to nothing due to repeated problems with her propulsion system. After the war, in late 1872, she joined a squadron sent to the Caribbean Sea to protect German interests in the region. The following year, the squadron was recalled to the coast of Spain to protect German interests during the Third Carlist War there. The squadron was disbanded in early 1874, allowing Elisabeth to be sent to East Asia, but she was ordered home in early 1875. The ship embarked on another major overseas voyage in 1876, intended to be a circumnavigation of the globe. During the voyage in early 1878, she led an intervention in Nicaragua to force a payment owed to a German businessman. Elisabeth arrived home later that year.

The ship made two further overseas cruises in the early 1880s; the first, from 1881 to 1883, took the ship back to East Asia. Her time there passed relatively uneventfully, apart from an intervention in Xiamen on behalf of a German business there. The second overseas cruise lasted from 1884 to 1886, and during this voyage, she was heavily involved with the expansion of the German colonial empire, first in West Africa, then formally proclaiming the colony of German South West Africa. In 1885, she participated in flag-raising ceremonies in the colonies of Neupommern and Kaiser-Wilhelmsland. The cruise ended with the ship participating in a naval demonstration to defend Germany's claim to Wituland, which would soon become German East Africa. Limited training activities followed in the mid-1880s, until she was struck from the naval register in 1887. She was then used as a barracks ship, and then as a stationary training ship from 1888 to 1903. She was sold to ship breakers the following year, though some parts of the ship were preserved.
