= SMS Nymphe (1863) =

Screw corvette of the Prussian and German Imperial Navy

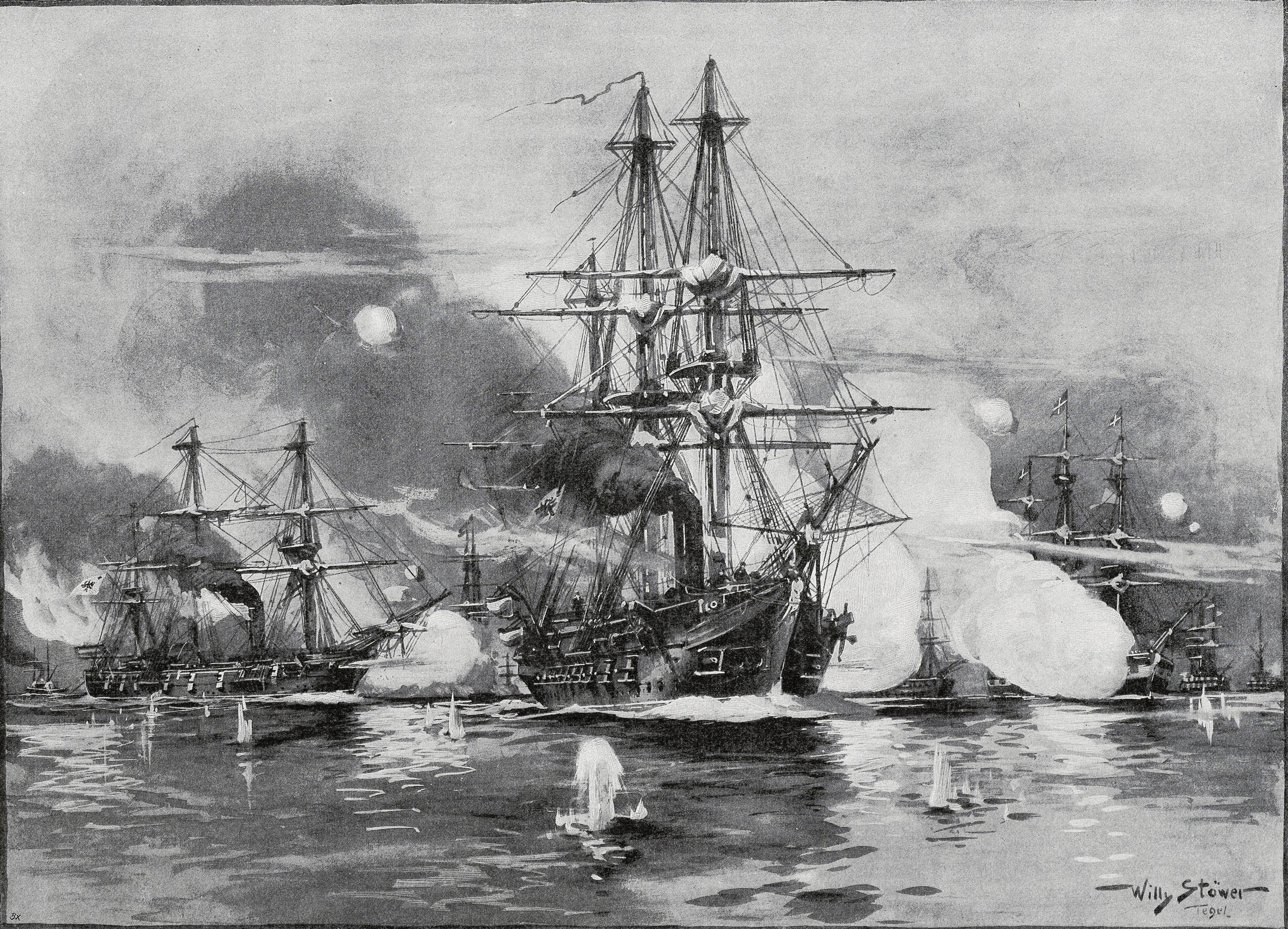
- Painting of the Battle of Jasmund by Willy Stöwer, depicting the Prussian squadron; Nymphe is at left, astern of Arcona

History

Prussia
- Name: Nymphe
- Namesake: Nymph
- Builder: Königliche Werft, Danzig
- Laid down: 25 January 1862
- Launched: 15 April 1863
- Commissioned: 20 February 1864
- Decommissioned: 7 October 1885
- Stricken: 21 July 1887
- Fate: Broken up, 1891

General characteristics
- Class & type: Nymphe-class corvette
- Displacement: Full load: 1,202 t (1,183 long tons)
- Length: 64.9 m (212 ft 11 in) (loa)
- Beam: 10.2 m (33 ft 6 in)
- Draft: 3.92 m (12 ft 10 in)
- Installed power: 4 × fire-tube boilers; 800 PS (790 ihp)
- Propulsion: 1 × marine steam engine; 1 × Screw propeller
- Sail plan: Full ship rig
- Speed: 12 knots (22 km/h; 14 mph)
- Range: 1,250 nmi (2,320 km; 1,440 mi) at 12 knots (22 km/h; 14 mph)
- Crew: 14 officers; 176 sailors
- Armament: 10 × 36-pounder guns; 6 × 12-pounder guns

SMS Nymphe was the lead ship of the Nymphe class of steam corvettes, the first ship of that type to be built for the Prussian Navy. She had one sister ship, Medusa, and the vessels were wooden-hulled ships armed with a battery of sixteen guns. She was ordered as part of a naval expansion program to counter the Danish Navy over the disputed ownership of Schleswig and Holstein. Nymphe was laid down in January 1862, was launched in April 1863, and was completed in October that year.

Nymphe saw action during the Second Schleswig War against Denmark in 1864 at the Battle of Jasmund. She was heavily engaged by a Danish frigate in the battle; she received around 70 hits, mostly to her rigging, though she was not seriously damaged. The ship, which had been on a cruise in the Mediterranean Sea, was in the process of being recalled to Germany during the Austro-Prussian War in 1866, and as a result, saw no action during the conflict. During the Franco-Prussian War in 1870, a French squadron of ironclads had anchored off Danzig, and Nymphe launched a surprise night attack on the idle vessels, though she inflicted no serious damage on the armored French ships. Her attack nevertheless convinced the French admiral that his heavy ships were not useful in a close blockade of German ports, and so they left.

In 1871, Nymphe embarked on a major overseas deployment to the Pacific Ocean and East Asia, where her captain conducted negotiations with various governments and she visited numerous cities. She remained abroad until mid-1874, after which she was converted into a training ship for apprentice seamen. She served in that capacity for the next decade, during which she conducted training cruises, usually to the Americas, though in 1882 she toured the Mediterranean Sea. In poor condition and in need of a complete reconstruction by 1885, she was stricken from the naval register in July 1887 and hulked. Nymphe was ultimately sold in 1891 and broken up in Hamburg.

== Design ==
The two Nymphe-class corvettes were ordered in the early 1860s as part of a program to strengthen the Prussian Navy when the likelihood of a conflict with Denmark over the Schleswig–Holstein question became increasingly likely. The design for the class was completed in 1861 and work began on both ships the next year.

Nymphe was 64.9 meters (212 ft 11 in) long overall, with a beam of 10.2 m (33 ft 6 in) and a draft of 3.92 m (12 ft 10 in) forward. She displaced 1,202 metric tons (1,183 long tons) at full load. The ship's crew consisted of 14 officers and 176 enlisted men. She was powered by a single marine steam engine that drove a two-bladed screw propeller, with steam provided by four coal-fired fire-tube boilers, which gave her a top speed of 12 knots (22 km/h; 14 mph) at 800 metric horsepower (790 ihp). She had a cruising radius of 1,250 nautical miles (2,320 km; 1,440 mi) at a speed of 12 knots (22 km/h; 14 mph). Nymphe was equipped with a full ship rig to supplement her steam engine.

Nymphe was armed with a battery of ten 36-pounder guns and six 12-pounder guns, all smoothbores mounted on the broadside. In 1869, these guns were replaced with seventeen, and later nineteen, rifled 12 cm (4.7 in) 23-caliber guns. Later in her career, these were reduced to nine guns.

== Service history ==
Illustration of a Prussian squadron in 1864; Nymphe is at far right

Nymphe was ordered on 23 July 1861, the first of the wooden steam corvettes to be built for the Prussian Navy. Her keel was laid down on 25 January 1862 at the Königliche Werft (Royal Shipyard) in Danzig, and on 23 July her name was decided by an order from the Prussian Navy Department. The completed hull was launched on 15 April 1863 and she was completed for sea trials by late October. During the trials, it was discovered that the Prussian crew members did not have sufficient experience to operate the steam machinery, and so technicians from J Penn & Sons, the British manufacturer of the ship's engines, had to remain aboard to assist them. Nymphe transferred on 25 November to spend the winter months in Swinemünde, since the port would not remain frozen over as long as Danzig. In addition, as tensions rose between Denmark and Prussia over the Schleswig-Holstein Question, the move west would allow Nymphe to cooperate with the gunboats based in Stralsund.

=== Second Schleswig War ===
Nymphe was commissioned for the first time on 20 February 1864, shortly after the outbreak of the Second Schleswig War against Denmark. She joined the squadron commanded by Kapitän zur See (KzS—Captain at Sea) Eduard von Jachmann, whose flagship was the frigate Arcona. Nymphe's commander was Kapitänleutnant (captain lieutenant) Reinhold von Werner. The Danish fleet, which was much more powerful than the Prussian fleet, immediately proclaimed a blockade of the Baltic and North Sea ports of Prussia and the other German states. The Danes began seizing Prussian merchant ships in the area, prompting Admiral Prince Adalbert of Prussia, the commander of the Prussian Navy, to begin plans for an operation against the blockade using Jachmann's squadron. By mid-March, the Prussian ships were ready for action and the ice had receded far enough that Prince Adalbert ordered Jachmann to conduct a reconnaissance of the blockading force on 16 March. Two days before, a Danish squadron consisting of one ship of the line, one screw frigate, and two screw corvettes and commanded by Rear Admiral Edvard van Dockum had arrived off Swinemünde. Arcona and Nymphe patrolled off Greifswald, but the weather was poor, with snow showers hampering visibility. The Prussian gunboats, led by the paddle steamer Loreley, remained closer to Swinemünde. Jachmann spotted three vessels at around 15:30, but there was not enough time before dark to catch them. Instead, Jachmann turned back to Swinemünde, intending to try again the following day.

==== Battle of Jasmund ====
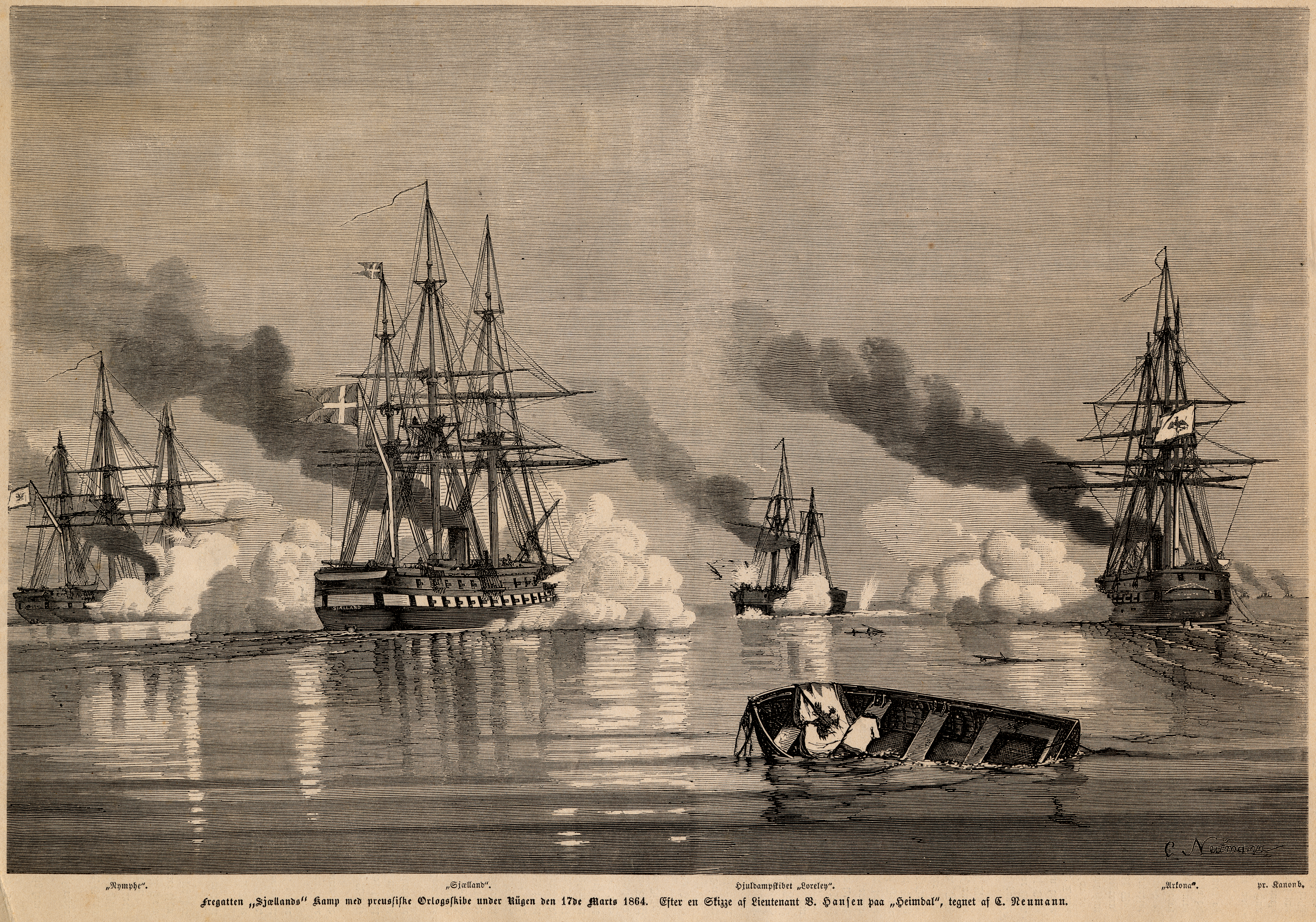
Illustration of the action by Carl Neumann; Nypmhe is at left

The next morning, at 07:30, Jachmann took his ships out of the mouth of the Oder, initially steaming east. Unable to locate any Danish warships, the Prussians turned west and, as they approached the island of Greifswalder Oie, lookouts aboard the ships spotted smoke to the northwest at about 13:15. The Prussians continued on toward the island of Rügen; off the Jasmund Peninsula, Jachmann's ships encountered Dockum's squadron. There, with Arcona and Nymphe in the lead, Jachmann turned to engage the Danes; Loreley increased speed to join the two corvettes while Jachmann sent the gunboats to the coast of Rügen, where they could be used to cover his withdrawal. From further north, Dockum was awaiting the arrival of the steam frigate Tordenskjold.

At 14:30, Arcona opened fire, targeting the frigate Sjælland; a few minutes later, after Sjælland closed to 1,500 meters (1,600 yd), Dockum turned his flagship to starboard and began firing broadsides at Arcona. Jachmann turned Arcona to starboard as well, having realized the strength of the Danish squadron. He failed to inform the captains of Nymphe and Loreley of his decision to withdraw, and they continued to steam east for several minutes before they conformed to his maneuver. At this time, Dockum shifted fire to Nymphe and scored several hits, including damage to her funnel that reduced her speed temporarily. Dockum attempted to overtake and cut off Nymphe and Loreley from Arcona, but Nymphe's crew was able to quickly repair the damage she had sustained, allowing her to increase speed, though she continued to take hits.

Nymphe and Loreley came under heavy fire from the pursuing Danish squadron; at 16:00 Loreley broke off to the west toward Stralsund and Dockum allowed her to leave, preferring to continue after Jachmann's corvettes. Both sides continued to score hits on each other until they checked fire at around 16:45 as the range grew too long. By 18:00, Dockum ended the chase and steamed off to the east, allowing Jachmann to return to Swinemünde. In the course of the battle, Nymphe had received 19 hits in the hull and around 50 to her rigging, and her gig was shot away. Though she was the most heavily damaged vessel on either side of the battle, she was never in serious danger, and her crew suffered just two dead and four wounded.

Jachmann made several more sorties into the Baltic without encountering any Danish vessels on 19 March, 9 and 14 April, and 6 May. On 6 June, Nymphe participated in a naval review held for King William I in Swinemünde. Jachmann's squadron steamed from there to Pillau on 12 June, remaining there for ten days before returning. On 24 September, she went into the shipyard in Danzig for periodic maintenance, and in mid-November, she moved to the newly-acquired naval base in Kiel to spend the winter.

=== Austro-Prussian and Franco-Prussian Wars ===
In early 1865, the Prussian Navy decided to send Nymphe and the gunboat Delphin to the Mediterranean Sea. The two ships began a short training cruise to Sonderburg and Wismar, and on 6 August, Nymphe took the 15 cm (5.9 in) gun from Delphin on board in preparation for the voyage to the Mediterranean to improve the gunboat's seakeeping. Once they arrived in the Aegean Sea on 22 September, Nymphe transferred the gun back to Delphin. The cruise was cut short in March 1866, as both vessels were ordered to return to Prussia as tensions with the Austrian Empire began to mount. The ships arrived in the new naval depot in Geestemünde in mid-July, by which time the Austro-Prussian War had broken out and had been decided at the Battle of Königgrätz. Nymphe joined the North Sea Flotilla, but with the war all but over she saw no action. The flotilla was dissolved on 29 September and Nymphe went to Geestemünde, where she was decommissioned on 31 March 1867. On 16 April, the ship was moved to the Baltic, visiting Kiel and Danzig, where she entered the Königliche Werft for extensive repairs to her boilers.

Nymphe} remained out of service until the outbreak of the Franco-Prussian War in July 1870, when she returned to service as part of the general mobilization of what was now the North German Federal Navy. On 21 July, she was assigned to the defenses of Neufahrwasser that protected Danzig. The following month, a French squadron consisting of three ironclads and an aviso under Admiral Édouard Bouët-Willaumez arrived off Danzig and anchored in the Putziger Wiek at around 18:00 on 21 August, on the western end of the Danziger Bucht. Nymphe's commander, Korvettenkapitän (KK—Corvette Captain) Weickhmann, decided to make a surprise attack the next morning. At midnight on 22 August, he sortied and began a slow approach to the French squadron, which remained at anchor overnight. At 01:15, Nymphe came within sight of the French ships, and at a distance of 1.3 nautical miles (2.4 km; 1.5 mi), she turned to port and engaged the French squadron. Accounts differ on the details of the action; the historians Hildebrand, Röhr, and Steinmetz state that she fired a broadside at the French ironclad Thétis before turning to starboard to fire another broadside, inflicting no damage. But Alfred Stenzel, who was an officer in the North German Federal Navy at the time, reported in an 1899 account that Nymphe fired two broadsides at Bouët-Willaumez's flagship, the ironclad Surveillante, before turning to flee with Thétis in pursuit. Regardless, Nymphe escaped and the French vessels could not get underway quickly enough to catch her. By 03:00, Nymphe was safely behind the coastal fortifications at Neufahrwasser.

Bouët-Willaumez decided that the attack demonstrated that the large ironclads could not be effectively used close to shore, and that smaller, shallower-draft vessels would be necessary. He therefore took his ships away from Danzig, which Nymphe confirmed by a reconnaissance to Rixhöft. At this point, the North German naval command decided to embark on a commerce raiding strategy to attack French merchant shipping in the Atlantic Ocean. Nymphe was deemed to be too slow for the task, and so she was decommissioned on 25 August so her crew could be transferred to the faster corvette Augusta, which entered service in late October.

=== Overseas deployment ===
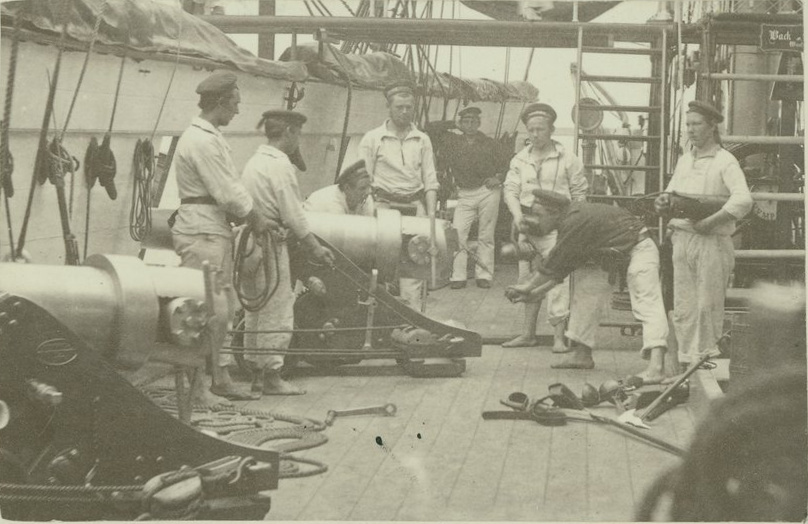
Loading the guns on Nymphe, 1872

Nymphe remained in reserve through the end of the war, when she was recommissioned under command of KK Louis von Blanc on 1 June 1871 to relieve her sister ship Medusa, which had been blockaded by French warships in Japan during the war. Nymphe left Kiel on 25 July and made a stop in Cowes, where she was visited by the British royal family. She reached Rio de Janeiro, Brazil on 14 October, where she stayed for two weeks. During this period, some of her crew were in a local restaurant when a fight broke out between them and some pro-French civilians; the sailors were arrested by the Brazilian police, which prompted the German government to consider sending a squadron of warships to coerce their release. In response to the threatened naval deployment, the Brazilian authorities released the men, allowing Nymphe to proceed with her voyage on 27 October. While in South Africa, nine members of her crew deserted to join a diamond rush; Nymphe quickly left port on 22 November after the desertion to prevent any others from joining them.

After crossing the Indian Ocean, she visited several ports in Australia and then sailed north into Oceania—the first German warship to reach the South Pacific—and visited several islands that had not yet been visited by German vessels. These included the town of Levuka in Fiji in early March 1872, where Blanc negotiated a protection agreement, which was rejected by German chancellor Otto von Bismarck. On 15 March, Nymphe arrived in Apia in Samoa, where Blanc helped to settle disputes between German merchants and chiefs on the islands. She left the islands at the end of the month and arrived in Yokohama, Japan on 20 April, where she met the frigate Hertha, the other member of the East Asia station. Nymphe then began a tour of Japanese and Russian ports, including Nagoya, Japan, which had recently been opened to foreign ships, before stopping in Hong Kong on 25 December. Nymphe visited Singapore in March 1873, after which a large portion of her crew became ill. She then went to Borneo to enforce German demands for financial compensation for a German company. Nymphe then visited Jolo in the Sulu Archipelago, then part of the Spanish Empire, where Sultan Jamal ul-Azam requested that Germany sign a protectorate agreement, since he wished to declare independence from Spain. Blanc passed the request on to Berlin, where it was rejected by Bismarck.

On 11 April, she returned to Singapore; Blanc and a contingent from the ship traveled overland to Bangkok, Siam, where they delivered the Order of the Black Eagle to the King of Siam, Chulalongkorn. Nymphe left Singapore on 16 May to begin a survey for a potential German coaling station in the South China Sea. She surveyed the Anambas Islands, but these proved to be unusable, as did Hainan, which lacked a suitable harbor. Nymphe also examined the Chusan Archipelago, but it too lacked a usable harbor. Nymphe left Chinese waters on 10 October to return to Yokohama. There, Blanc began preparations to open a hospital for German naval and merchant sailors, which was opened in 1878. The ship received the order to return to Germany on 12 September, and she crossed the Pacific to San Francisco, United States, before steaming south, rounding Cape Horn on 11 February 1874. While passing into the Baltic, the ship ran aground on a rock off Langeland, and she had to be pulled free by a pair of gunboats. Nymphe arrived in Kiel on 12 May and was decommissioned there eight days later.

=== Later career ===
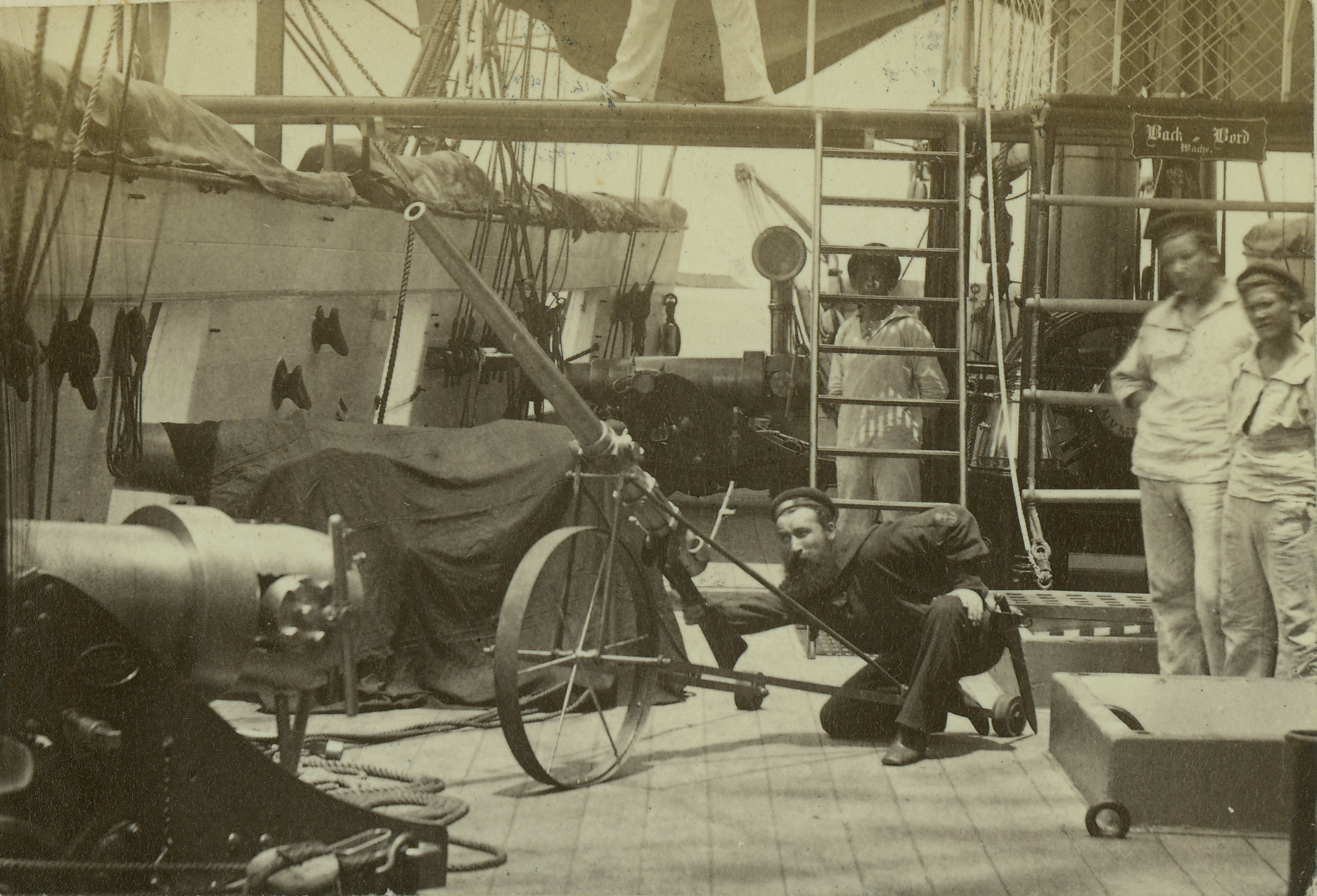
A Krupp Ballonabwehrkanone (anti-balloon gun) on Nymphe, 1872

Nymphe was recommissioned on 1 June for use as a training ship for Schiffsjungen (apprentice seamen). She initially embarked on a cruise in the Baltic with the brigs Undine and Musquito before carrying Prince Friedrich Karl of Prussia to visit the kings of Denmark and Sweden. She participated in a fleet review for now Kaiser Wilhelm I on 19 September. She moved to Danzig, where she was decommissioned for an overhaul on 15 October. This work was completed by late 1875, and she returned to service on 1 April 1876 for training ship duties. Nymphe embarked on a major training cruise to North and South America, ranging as far north as Halifax, Canada and as far south as Montevideo, Uruguay. While in Uruguay, she steamed up the Uruguay River to Paysandú, where a memorial for the German consul, who had been murdered several years earlier, was dedicated with military honors. The ship arrived back in Kiel on 10 September 1877, where she was decommissioned on the 27th.

The ship was reactivated on 1 January 1878 to begin the next year's training routine. She began the overseas training cruise in mid-July, and it repeated the destination of the previous year's cruise, though this time she only went as far south as Rio de Janeiro. In January 1879, she stopped in several ports in Venezuela to protect Germans during a period of unrest in the country. She carried a Venezuelan government delegation from Puerto Cabello to La Guaira to negotiate with the rebels there. She was later replaced by the ironclad Hansa, allowing her to continue her training cruise. She returned to Kiel on 12 September; six days later, while Admiral Albrecht von Stosch, the Chief of the Kaiserliche Admiralität (Imperial Admiralty), was visiting the ship in Wiker Bucht, she was driven aground by a sudden gust of wind. Stosch had to be taken ashore by a boat, while Nymphe was pulled free by another vessel. The ship was decommissioned in Danzig on 30 September for repairs and a re-boilering.

On 3 April 1880, Nymphe was recommissioned and began training cruises in the Baltic. She began the overseas cruise on 12 July; on the way out, she stopped in Copenhagen, Denmark, where Danish naval officers visited the ship. Unlike in previous years, the training cruise was for the most part limited to the West Indies. She made a stop in Puerto Cabello, where she was visited by the President of Venezuela, Antonio Guzmán Blanco. On the way back to Germany, she stopped in Hampton Roads, United States, where she was visited by the family of President James A. Garfield. She was decommissioned in Danzig on 3 October and she remained out of service for the next year and a half. On 1 April 1882, she was reactivated for another training cruise, which for that year went to the Mediterranean to strengthen the German naval forces in the region during the 'Urabi revolt in Egypt. Nymphe left Kiel on 15 July and visited several ports in the Levant, stopped in Suda Bay, Crete, and had to go to Malta after a number of her crew were sick. An outbreak of typhoid fever prompted a second stay in Malta in December, and this time, the entire crew disembarked in Valletta so the ship could be disinfected.

The ship was out of service owing to the fever until 26 February 1883, after which she visited numerous Greek ports; while in Piraeus, she was visited by the Greek king, George I. She then began the voyage back to Germany, and on the way stopped in Lisbon, Portugal, where she was visited by the King of Portugal, Luís I. Nymphe arrived in Kiel on 6 September and she was decommissioned there on 29 September. The ship conducted short training cruises in the Baltic and took part in training exercises with the main fleet in June 1884. On 16 July, she began the next major cruise to the West Indies, during which she stayed in Sabanilla, Colombia, from late February to late March 1885. Her presence was necessitated by a revolution in the country that threatened German interests. She returned to Germany in early September and joined fleet exercises in the North and Baltic Seas. The ship was decommissioned for the last time on 7 October. Nymphe was worn out by this time, and it was determined that further use would require a complete rebuilding of the vessel's wooden hull, so she was stricken from the naval register on 21 July 1887 and thereafter used as a hulk for machinist training in Kiel. In 1891, she was sold for scrap and broken up in Hamburg.
