= SMS Medusa (1864) =

Screw corvette of the Prussian and German Imperial Navy

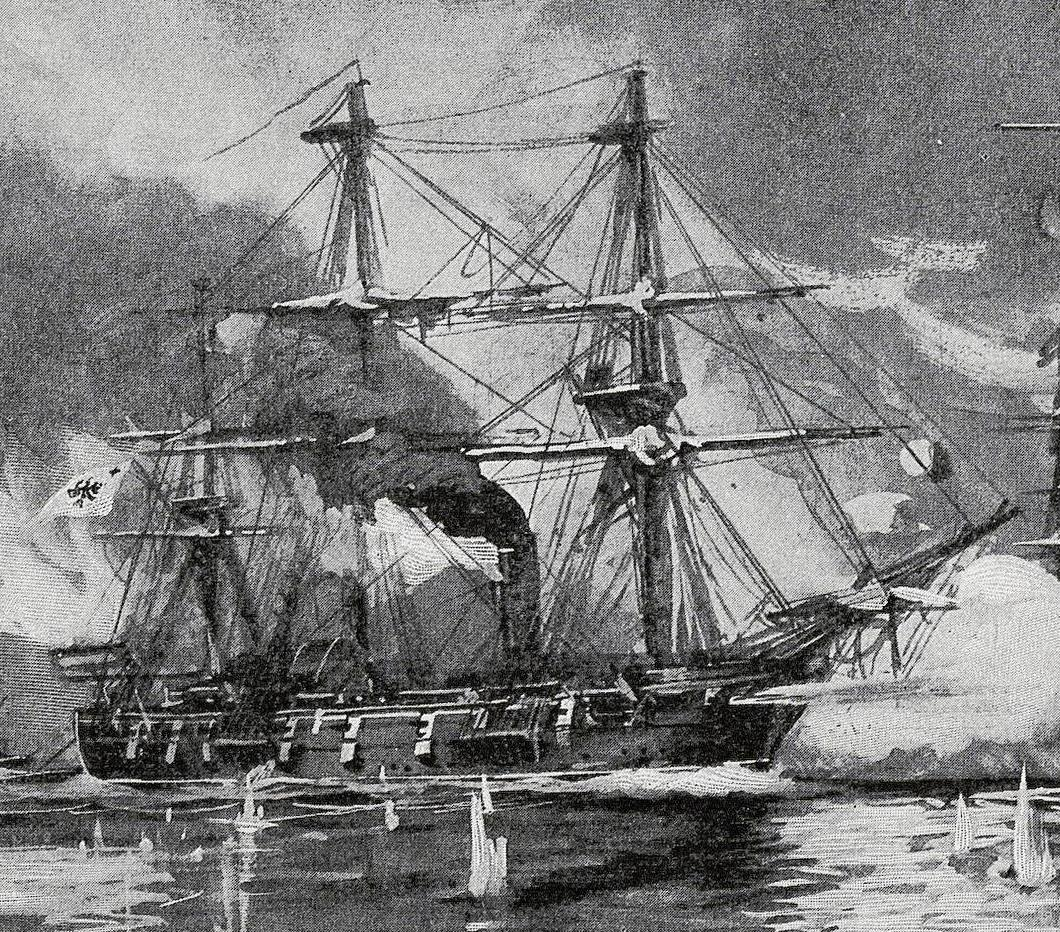
- Illustration of Medusa's sister ship Nymphe at the Battle of Jasmund, by Willy Stöwer

History

Prussia
- Name: Medusa
- Namesake: Medusa
- Builder: Königliche Werft, Danzig
- Laid down: 6 February 1862
- Launched: 20 October 1864
- Commissioned: 10 April 1867
- Stricken: 5 April 1881
- Fate: Broken up, 1891

General characteristics
- Class & type: Nymphe-class corvette
- Displacement: Full load: 1,202 metric tons (1,183 long tons)
- Length: 64.9 m (212 ft 11 in) (loa)
- Beam: 10.2 m (33 ft 6 in)
- Draft: 3.92 m (12 ft 10 in)
- Installed power: 4 × fire-tube boilers; 800 metric horsepower (790 ihp)
- Propulsion: 1 × marine steam engine; 1 × screw propeller
- Speed: 12 knots (22 km/h; 14 mph)
- Range: 1,250 nautical miles (2,320 km; 1,440 mi) at 12 knots (22 km/h; 14 mph)
- Crew: 14 officers; 176 sailors
- Armament: 10 × 36-pounder guns; 6 × 12-pounder guns

SMS Medusa was a steam corvette built for the Prussian Navy in the 1860s. She was the second and final member of the Nymphe class, ordered as part of a naval expansion program to counter the Danish Navy over the disputed ownership of Schleswig and Holstein. Medusa was laid down in February 1862, was launched in October 1864, and was completed in September 1865. She had one sister ship, Nymphe, and the vessels were wooden-hulled ships armed with a battery of sixteen guns.

Medusa went on two major overseas cruises during her career, the first to the Mediterranean Sea in 1867–1868 during the Cretan Revolt against Ottoman rule. The second, lengthier voyage lasted from 1868 to 1871, and centered on operations in East Asia. There, she protected individuals from the German states in Japan during the final stage of the Boshin War, helped to suppress Chinese pirates, and visited numerous ports to show the flag. After the outbreak of the Franco-Prussian War in 1870, Medusa was trapped in Yokohama, Japan by a French squadron blockading the port; as a result, she saw no action during the conflict.

After returning to unified Germany in 1872, Medusa was converted into a training ship, a role she filled for the next eight years. During this period, she went on a number of training cruises, both in the Baltic Sea and longer voyages to North, Central, and South America, as well as the Mediterranean. She helped to monitor tensions in the Balkans in the mid-1870s and helped to secure restitution for the murder of a German diplomat in Salonika. Worn out by 1880 and in need of a thorough overhaul, the navy instead decided to remove the ship from service, using her as a hulk until 1891, when she was sold for scrap.

== Design ==
The two Nymphe-class corvettes were ordered in the early 1860s as part of a program to strengthen the Prussian Navy when the likelihood of a conflict with Denmark over the Schleswig–Holstein question increased. The design for the class was completed in 1861 and work began on both ships the next year.

Medusa was 64.9 meters (212 ft 11 in) long overall, with a beam of 10.2 m (33 ft 6 in) and a draft of 3.92 m (12 ft 10 in) forward. She displaced 1,202 metric tons (1,183 long tons) at full load. The ship's crew consisted of 14 officers and 176 enlisted men. She was powered by a single marine steam engine that drove a 2-bladed screw propeller, with steam provided by four coal-fired fire-tube boilers, which gave her a top speed of 12 knots (22 km/h; 14 mph) at 800 metric horsepower (790 ihp). She had a cruising radius of 1,250 nautical miles (2,320 km; 1,440 mi) at a speed of 12 knots (22 km/h; 14 mph). Medusa was equipped with a full ship rig to supplement her steam engine.

Medusa was armed with a battery of ten 36-pounder guns and six 12-pounder guns, all on the broadside. In 1869, these guns were replaced with seventeen, and later nineteen, 12 cm (4.7 in) 23-caliber guns. Later in her career, these were reduced to nine guns.

== Service history ==
Medusa was ordered in 1861, and her name was assigned by an order from the Prussian Navy Department on 23 July 1861, before work began on the vessel. Her keel was laid down on 6 February 1862 at the Königliche Werft (Royal Shipyard) in Danzig, but work proceeded slowly owing to budgetary disputes between the Landtag (State Diet) and the Prussian Minister of War, Albrecht von Roon, who was also the naval minister. In addition, the navy wanted to use the experience gained in building her sister ship Nymphe during the construction of Medusa. These issues were pushed aside by the outbreak of the Second Schleswig War against Denmark in early 1864, since new warships were needed to counter the significantly stronger Danish fleet. On 20 October, Medusa was launched, though the war ended ten days later. Fitting-out work then commenced, and the ship was ready to begin sea trials on 15 September 1865, which were conducted between Danzig and Swinemünde and lasted to the end of the month.

=== First overseas deployment ===
The navy planned to send Medusa on an expedition to the North Pole, but it abandoned the plan, and Medusa remained out of service through 1866, including during the Austro-Prussian War. On 10 April 1867, the ship was finally commissioned; this was followed by more sea trials from 15 to 22 May, after which she conducted training exercises that lasted until 25 August. These exercises were at times in company with the frigate Hertha. After the outbreak of the Cretan Revolt in 1866, what was now the North German Federal Navy decided to send a squadron to the Mediterranean Sea to protect German interests on the island and in the surrounding area. Medusa, Hertha, and the gunboat Blitz were assigned to the unit. Before they left, Medusa was fitted with an experimental oven to allow her crew to bake fresh bread during the deployment in the interest of improving the crew's rations, rather than relying entirely on hardtack. The three ships left Kiel on 14 September 1867; the first leg of the trip, to Portsmouth, Britain, saw the ships carry a crew for the new ironclad Kronprinz, which had just been completed there. After depositing the crew to take Kronprinz back to Germany, Medusa, Hertha, and Blitz continued on to the Mediterranean.

In late October, Medusa and Blitz arrived off Crete to participate in an international squadron to protect the local Greek civilians from the occupying Ottoman Army, but the necessity for their presence soon ended. The North German chancellor, Otto von Bismarck, initiated a conference between the Great Powers in Paris, France to avoid a wider war over the island. On 8 December, the three German ships met in Smyrna in the Ottoman Empire, and in early January 1868, the squadron commander, Kapitän zur See (KzS—Captain at Sea) Eduard Heldt went to visit the Ottoman government in Constantinople. This required passage through the Dardanelles and the Sea of Marmara, which were closed to large foreign warships, so Heldt had to transfer to Medusa for the voyage. From 12 to 24 January, Medusa began a tour of the Aegean Sea. The Mediterranean squadron was recalled on 16 February owing to increased tensions with France. Medusa initially stopped in Alexandria in Egypt before making the voyage home. She arrived back in Kiel in mid-April, and was scheduled to be equipped immediately for a deployment to East Asia, but the planned assignment was cancelled and she was instead decommissioned in Kiel on 15 May.

=== Second overseas deployment ===
Medusa was recommissioned on 20 August and was transferred to Danzig, though on 25 September she moved back to Kiel. She was sent to assist the Russian frigate Alexander Nevsky, which had run aground off Aarhus, but she was recalled before arriving when it became clear that the ship was beyond salvaging. On 20 October, she left Germany for an extended cruise abroad. She reached Rio de Janeiro, Brazil, on 15 December, where she was visited by Emperor Pedro II. Medusa continued the voyage on 3 January 1869, crossing the Indian Ocean and stopping at the island of Île Saint-Paul on 14 February. She sailed on to Batavia in the Dutch East Indies, where she met the Bremen-flagged full-rigged ship Adele, which had caught fire and burned badly. Medusa towed Adele to Singapore, where the crew could return home.

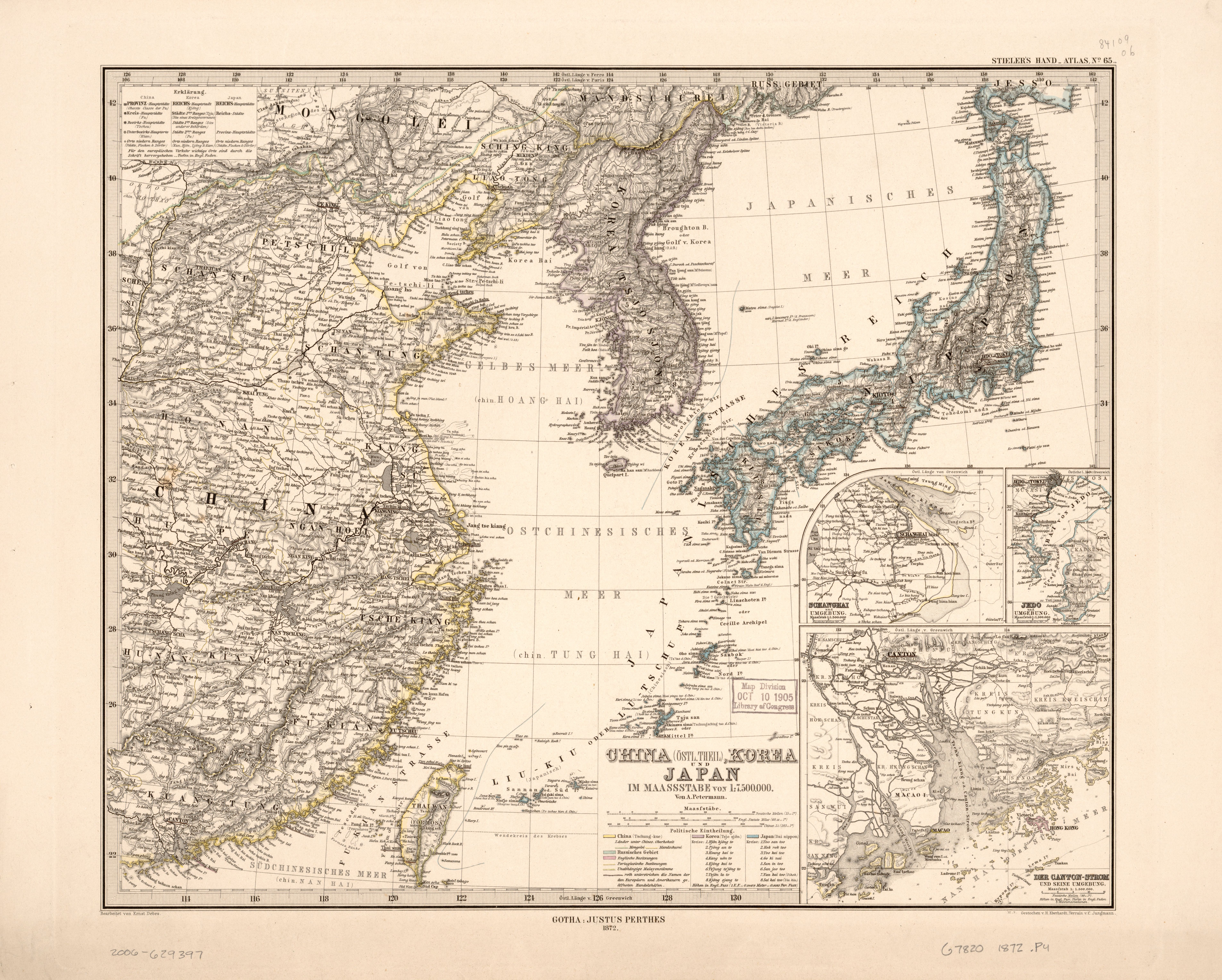
German 1872 map of China, Japan, and Korea

On Medusa's arrival in Singapore, the East Asia Station, which the Navy Department had ordered established in 1867, could finally be created. Medusa initially served as the flagship of the squadron until her long-time consort Hertha arrived on 12 February 1870 to take over that function. In the meantime, Medusa was first tasked with searching for an appropriate location for a coaling station that could be used to support the German squadron; she examined Blair's Harbour on the Malay Peninsula, the Ryukyu Islands, and the Gotō Islands. After returning to Singapore, Medusa received news from the German ambassador to Japan, Max von Brandt, that the Japanese had begun persecuting Europeans in the country, and that her presence was necessary to protect them. She left Singapore on 16 May 1869 and stopped briefly in Hong Kong, where she was present for the official renaming of the Prussian embassy there to the North German embassy, before continuing to Japan. She reached Hakodate in early June, where her crew observed the destruction of the former Prussian corvette Danzig, which had been sold to the Tokugawa Shogunate and renamed Kaiten.

Medusa sailed to Yokohama and then to Edo, where on 19 August she joined an international fleet of warships organized to pressure the Japanese Meiji government, then in the closing days of the Boshin War, to suppress the attacks on Europeans in the country. Medusa, being one of the shallower-draft vessels of the fleet, anchored close to shore, near the Japanese ironclad Kōtetsu. Negotiations were successfully completed the next day, and Medusa sailed back to Yokohama. She was caught in a typhoon while en route and was badly damaged when a barque was driven into her by the strong winds. During the storm, the United States sloop USS Idaho was also seriously damaged, and Medusa came to her aid; her crew were thanked by President Ulysses S. Grant for their actions. Medusa was under repair in Yokohama until late October.

Pirate attacks in Chinese waters drew Medusa there after repairs were completed; at the request of the German ambassador in Beijing, she operated with British warships to track down pirates attacking European merchant ships. A German barque, Apenrade, that was carrying a load of tea to New York had been attacked off Macao by a pirate junk. Medusa went there on 15 November to track down the pirates; on reaching Apenrade, the Germans discovered that her captain had been injured and a sailor had been killed, but most of her cargo remained, as the pirates had been scared off by the approach of another vessel. Apenrade went back to Macao, and Medusa began the search, along with one Portuguese, one United States, and two Chinese gunboats. The Portuguese gunboat captured the junk, sank it, and carried the crew to Guangzhou, where they were tried and executed for their crime. During the search, Medusa found and arrested another group of pirates who had recently attacked a British barque. Medusa's commander sent a report back to Berlin requesting the permanent stationing of gunboats in the region to help combat the pirates, and as a result, Hertha was dispatched to join his ship.

Medusa remained in Hong Kong through the end of January 1870, at which point she went to Bangkok, Siam, where she participated in ceremonies commemorating the death of the King of Siam, Mongkut. She also helped mediate a dispute over the sinking of a German merchant vessel in the Mekong River. On 10 April, Medusa left Bangkok and stopped in Saigon on the way back to Hong Kong; the ship had suffered a serious accident with her engine, forcing her to stop in the port for repairs. A French merchant vessel carried a badly injured crewman from Medusa back to Toulon, France. The engine could not be repaired in Saigon, so Medusa departed for Yokohama, traveling mostly by sail. She arrived there on 23 July, where she met Hertha. While there, Medusa celebrated "Napoleon Day", celebrating the anniversary of Napoleon's birth on 15 August, with a French ironclad in the port, neither vessel being aware that the Franco-Prussian War had broken out a month before. Shortly thereafter, a United States steamship arrived with news of the state of war, and the French East Asia Squadron arrived to blockade the German ship in port. Although it prevented Medusa from taking offensive measures against French shipping, the blockade tied down the French squadron and allowed German vessels to largely escape being attacked.

During this time the ship's engine was repaired, and she remained in the port until after the war ended, departing Yokohama on in mid-April 1871 after having received the order to return to the now-unified Germany on the second of the month. She steamed south, crossed the Indian Ocean, and then after rounding South Africa, turned north through the Atlantic and finally arrived in Kiel on 26 August. There, she received a thorough inspection before being decommissioned on 10 October; since the Kaiserliche Werft (Imperial Shipyard) in Kiel was not yet ready to repair the ship, she was moved to Danzig in August 1872, where she underwent a thorough overhaul and was converted for use as a training ship for Schiffsjungen (apprentice seamen).

=== Later career ===
Medusa was recommissioned on 15 March 1875 in Kiel, where she embarked a contingent of Schiffsjungen. She went on a short training cruise in the Baltic, visiting ports in Norway and Sweden. At the end of August, she embarked on a longer training cruise to South America and the West Indies; the first stops on the cruise included Santos, Brazil and Montevideo, Uruguay. Medusa then steamed north to Barbados, where she arrived on 9 January 1876. While there, she received a secret order from the Kaiserliche Admiralität (Imperial Admiralty). Under the pretext of a search for deserters, Medusa was to leave the West Indies for Lisbon, Portugal. This move would bring her closer to the Mediterranean without openly signaling Germany's intention to respond to uprisings against Ottoman rule in the Balkans. While en route to Lisbon, the ship's crew conducted intensive weapons training to be prepared for hostilities if the use of force proved to be necessary.

The ship arrived in Lisbon in mid-February, and on 16 March, Medusa was ordered to leave Lisbon and proceed to Messina in Sicily, where she received further orders to proceed to Salonika in what was then the Ottoman Empire. There, the French and German consuls had been murdered by the local Ottomans. On arriving there on 15 May, Medusa joined an international fleet that eventually included twenty-nine warships; Medusa was initially the only German vessel in the fleet. Her commander and a detachment from the crew went ashore to participate in the funeral for the consuls, after which the captain negotiated with the Ottoman government in Salonika for an indemnity for the murders. Additional German warships arrived in the area, and on 25 June, the armored training squadron with its flagship Kaiser reached the city, allowing Medusa to be released to return to training duties in mid-July. The rest of the cruise was conducted in the Mediterranean, and on 21 September, she arrived in Kiel, where she was decommissioned nine days later.

Medusa returned to service on 4 April 1877 for another year's training program. From April to early July she cruised in the Baltic, which included visits to Swedish ports, before she began preparations for the overseas cruise. On 27 July, she embarked on the voyage, which again went to South and Central American waters. Her tour extended as far south as Rio de Janeiro, and as far north as Saint Thomas in the Danish West Indies, where she stayed from 6 January to 16 February 1878. Here, she received orders to travel to Nicaragua to join the frigate Elisabeth; Medusa went to Colón, Panama, where an officer from the ship, Unterleutnant zur See (Sublieutenant at Sea) Theodor Harms went ashore to travel overland to investigate the military situation in Nicaragua. Medusa then went to San Juan del Norte, Nicaragua on 16 April, but she made no intervention in the country, and instead began her voyage back to Germany, stopping in several ports in the United States on the way back. Medusa arrived in Kiel on 15 September and was decommissioned there on 28 September.

For the last time, Medusa was commissioned on 1 April 1879 for another training program. In May and June, she conducted a cruise in the Baltic, as was the standard routine. Her voyage into the Atlantic began on 15 July, and this year, she visited numerous ports along the eastern coasts of North and South America, as far north as Halifax, Canada, and as far south as Bahía Blanca, Argentina. Other stops included the Antilles islands, La Guaira and Puerto Cabello, Venezuela, Norfolk, United States in May 1880; her last stop was in Halifax from mid-June to mid-July, after which she crossed the Atlantic and arrived back in Kiel on 10 September. On 30 September, the ship was inspected in Kiel and it was determined that further use would require a thorough overhaul, and so instead she was taken to Danzig where she was decommissioned and stricken from the naval register on 5 April 1881. She was used as a hulk until 1891, when she was sold for scrap and broken up.
