= USS Idaho (1864) =

Sloops-of-war of the United States Navy

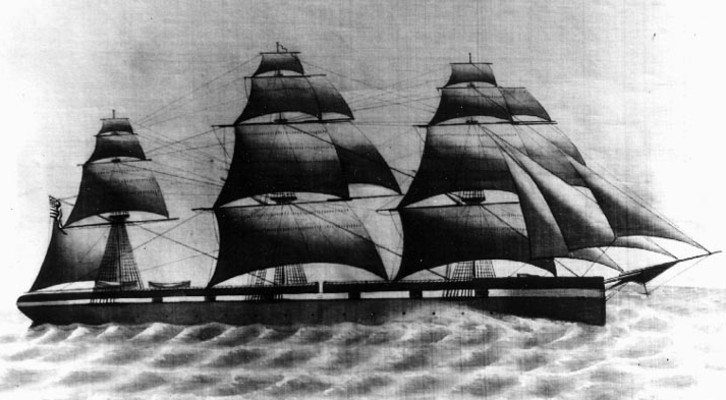
- Watercolor on silk, depicting Idaho under full sail following her conversion to a storeship.

History

United States
- Name: USS Idaho
- Namesake: Idaho
- Builder: George Steers of New York City
- Launched: 8 October 1864
- Acquired: 1866
- Commissioned: 2 April 1866
- Recommissioned: 3 October 1867
- Decommissioned: 31 December 1873
- Fate: sold, in 1874 to the East Indies Trading Company

General characteristics
- Type: Steam sloop
- Displacement: 3,241 t (3,190 long tons)
- Length: 298 ft (91 m)
- Beam: 44 ft 6 in (13.56 m)
- Draft: 16 ft (4.9 m)
- Propulsion: steam engine, with twin screws
- Speed: 15 knots (28 km/h; 17 mph)
- Armament: 8 t guns

USS Idaho, a 3,241-ton steam sloop, was part of an American Civil War program of large, very fast, steam cruisers. Completed in May 1866, she ran her sea trials the following August, making just over eight knots (15 km/h; 9.2 mph). Her boilers and engines, ordered as a result of political influence, failed totally to achieve her 15-knot (28 km/h; 17 mph) contract speed. The U.S. Congress, however, stepped in and ordered its purchase. The ship was then modified with sail and became one of the fastest ships in the U.S. Navy.

== Service history ==
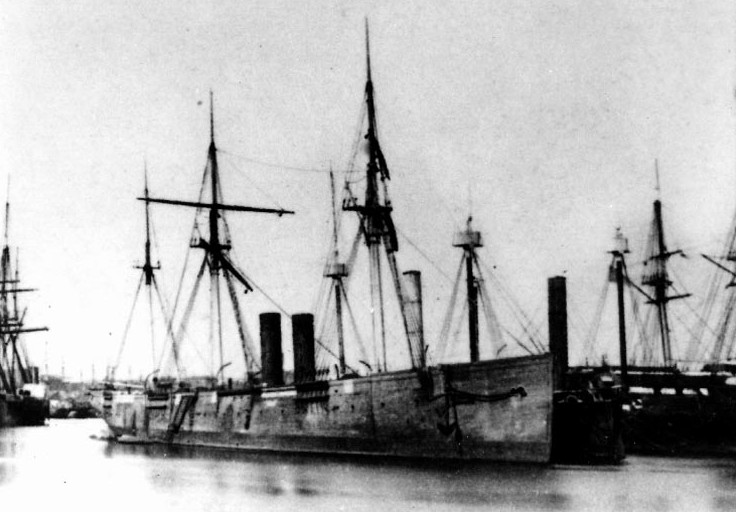
USS Idaho laid up at the New York Navy Yard after her unsuccessful trials

Idaho – the first U.S. Navy ship to bear that name—was launched as a wooden steam sloop 8 October 1864 by Henry Steers of Greenpoint, Brooklyn. Her twin-screw machinery was of a novel design by B. N. Dickerson and was built by Morgan Iron Works. She was completed in 1866 but upon sea trials in May was found to be far slower than the contract speed of 15 knots (28 km/h; 17 mph), having been in commission between 2 April and 26 May under the command of Captain John Lorimer Worden. A board of Naval Officers recommended her rejection, but Dickerson appealed to the United States Congress and obtained a resolution in February 1867 for her purchase by the navy.

She was subsequently converted to a full-rigged sailing ship at New York City and recommissioned 3 October 1867, Lt. Edward Hooker in command. The converted Idaho was one of the fastest sailing ships of her day, and sailed 1 November 1867 for Rio de Janeiro, Brazil. From there she continued the long voyage to the Far East, arriving Nagasaki 18 May 1868. During that passage, she logged over 18 knots (33 km/h; 21 mph), making her one of the fastest sailing ships ever built. The ship remained in Nagasaki for 15 months as a store and hospital ship for the Asiatic Squadron.

In mid-August 1869 Idaho moved to Yokohama, Empire of Japan, to prepare for the long voyage back to the United States, and soon afterward, 20 September, she got underway for San Francisco, California. Next day, however, the ship was hit by a raging typhoon. Her masts were carried away and her hull was severely damaged, but the stout ship stayed afloat and was brought back to Yokohama by her crew, with the assistance of the German corvette Medusa. Little more than a hulk, the gallant Idaho remained in the harbor until decommissioning 31 December 1873. She was sold in 1874 to the East Indies Trading Company.
