= Jade Treaty =

1853 treaty between Prussia and Oldenburg

The Jade Treaty (German: Jade-Vertrag) of 20 July 1853 between the Kingdom of Prussia and the Grand Duchy of Oldenburg provided for the handover of 340 hectares of Oldenburg territory at what is now Wilhelmshaven, Germany, on the western shore of the Jade Bight, a bay of the North Sea west of Bremerhaven. It was considered the best natural deep-water port in the German North Sea coast, and a good place for the naval base Prussia wished to build. The navy base built there became the nucleus of today's Wilhelmshaven.

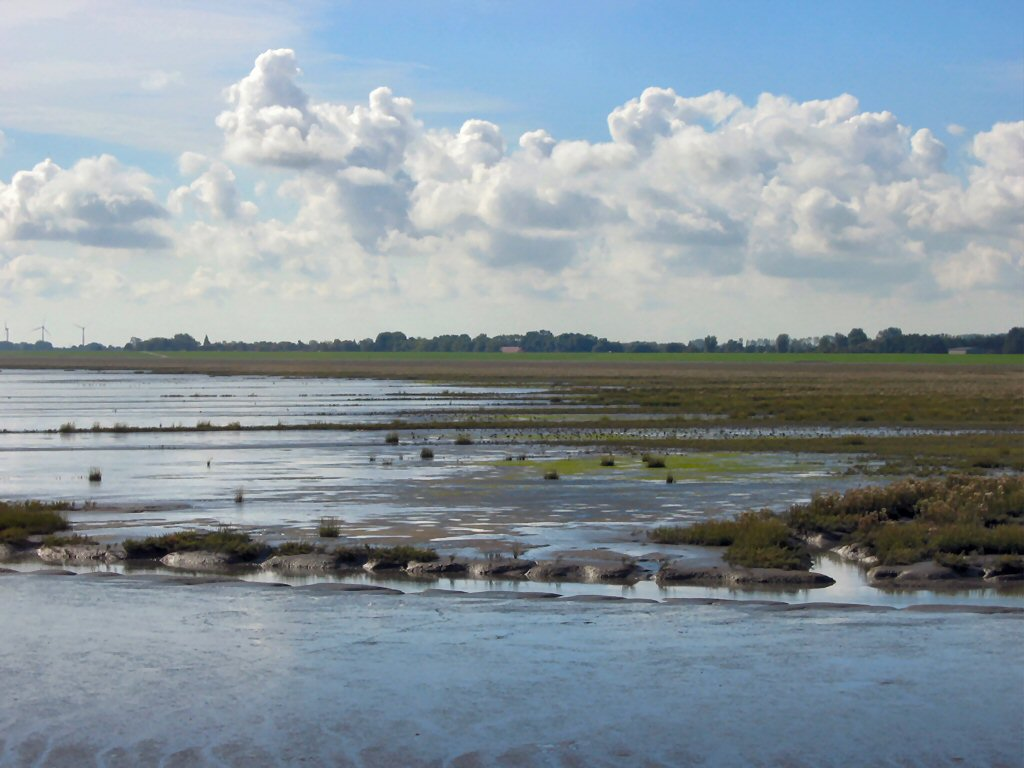
The Jade Bight held the potential of a fine deep water port.

Since before 1848 Prince Adalbert of Prussia had worked to build a Prussian Navy. During the First Schleswig War of 1848-51, Prussia had virtually no navy. Within a few days the Danish navy had destroyed German maritime commerce in the North Sea and the Baltic Sea. By 1852 Prussia had started to expand its fleet and needed a good port on the North Sea, which it had lacked since the Congress of Vienna.

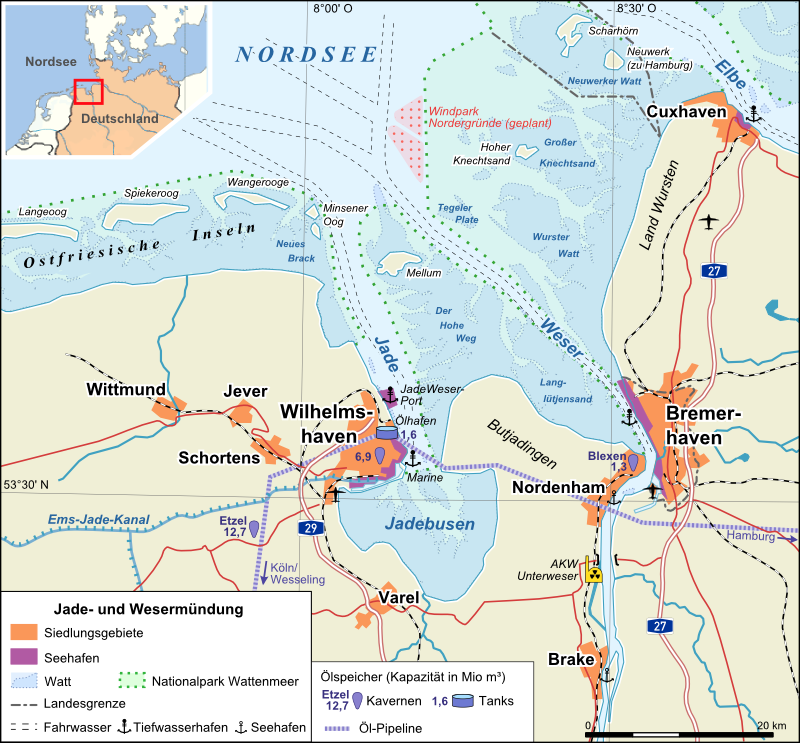
The Wilhelmshaven and Jade Bight area as developed today.

The Jade Bight area offered deep water, a good anchorage and no ice in winter. Oldenburg welcomed the Prussian idea as a powerful ally and needed money to end the Bentinck succession dispute. From 1854, Prussia established the fortress, naval base and city of Wilhelmshaven, which would be useful in the Second Schleswig War of 1864.
