= Fuelling station =

Facility for dispensing coal or oil for vehicles and power plants

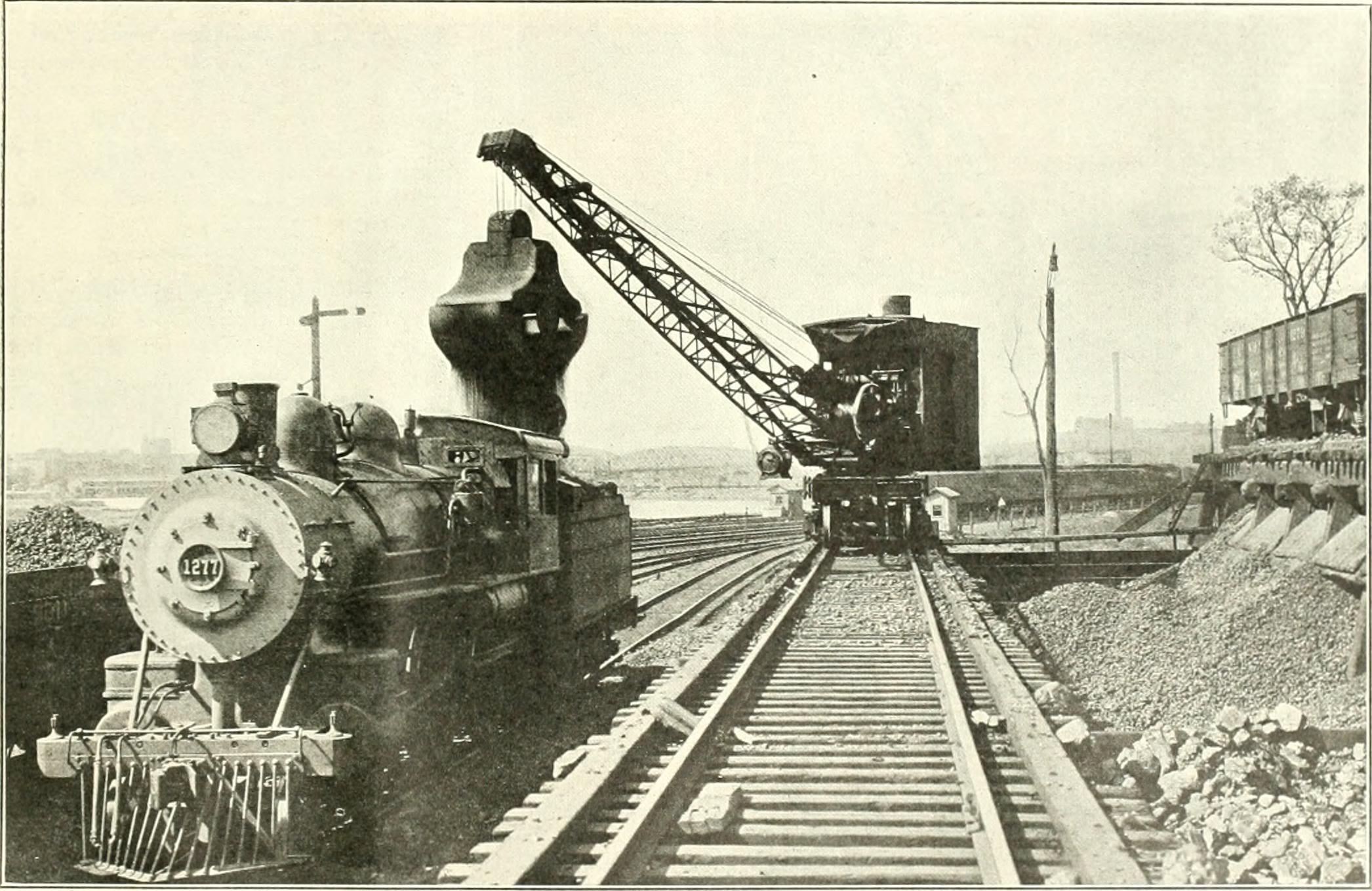
Railroad coaling plant, 1904

Fuelling stations, also known as coaling stations, are repositories of fuel (initially coal and later oil) that have been located to service commercial and naval vessels. Today, the term "coaling station" can also refer to coal storage and feeding units in fossil-fuel power stations.

== History ==
Initially named a coaling station due to the use of coal for steam generation, a fuelling station was built for the purpose of replenishing coal supplies for ships or railway locomotives. The term is often associated with 19th and early 20th century seaports associated with blue water navies, who used coaling stations as a means of extending the range of warships. In the late 19th century, steamships powered by coal began to replace sailing ships as the principal means of propulsion for ocean transport. Fuelling stations transitioned to oil as boilers moved from being coal-fired to oil- or hybrid oil-and-coal-firing, coal being completely replaced as steam engines gave way to internal combustion and gas turbine power plants.

The need for naval fuelling stations was a key driver of colonialism in Oceania. The American-German dispute over the Pago Pago coaling station was the driving factor behind the 1887-1889 Samoan crisis. The Melanesian island of New Caledonia, with its local coal mines, enabled maritime transport within the second French colonial empire and spurred rivalries with Japanese and Australian naval interests.

== Naval fuelling stations ==
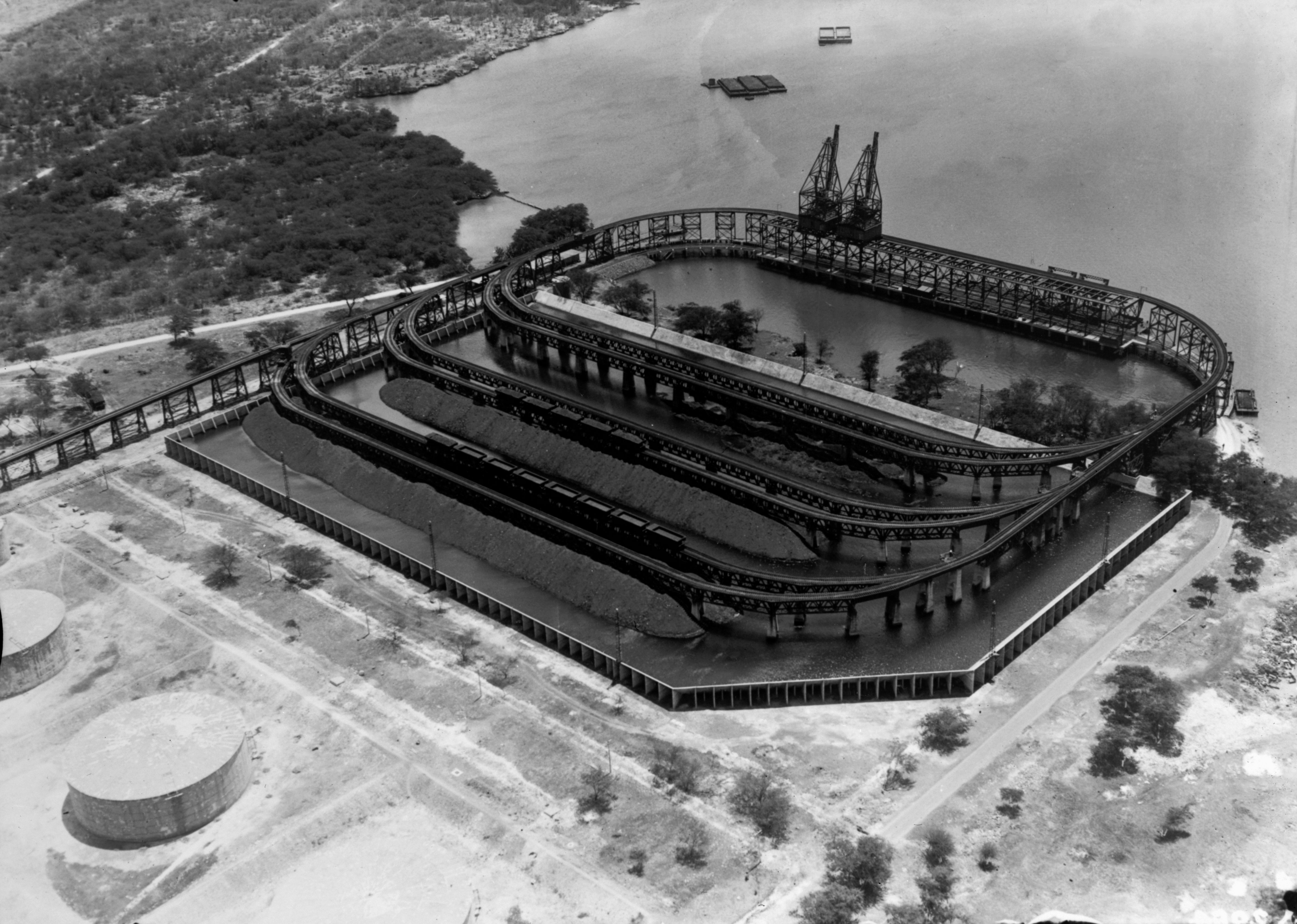
The coaling station at Pearl Harbor with fuel tanks in the foreground, in 1919.

Countries with large naval forces must maintain means for fuelling their fleets in times of conflict, to this end defended fuelling stations were set up around theaters of operations. Examples of such fuelling stations were almost any of the principal ports of the British Isles, Canada, Australia, New Zealand, British Africa, or India. In addition, there were facilities for coaling vessels at St. Helena, Ascension, and the Falkland Islands in the South Atlantic; at Jamaica and Bermuda in the North Atlantic, at Gibraltar, Malta, and Port Said in the Mediterranean; at Aden, on the Gulf of Aden; at Colombo in Ceylon (Sri Lanka); at Singapore; and at Labuan in the China Sea; at Hong Kong on the Chinese coast; at Chagos, Seychelles, or Mauritius in the Indian Ocean; at Thursday Island and Suva, Fiji, in the South Pacific: (British) and at Honolulu, Pago Pago and Manila in the Pacific for the United States. While defense of naval fuelling stations has historically focused on attack by other naval powers the USS Cole bombing in the Yemeni port of Aden in October 2000 has focused attention on the importance of ship defense during refueling operations even in friendly fuelling stations.

== Commercial fuelling stations ==
As international trade grew a defined set of fixed routes, sea lanes were established with fuelling stations appearing at strategic points along these routes. Since most fuelling stations did not possess natural resources in coal or oil the "bunkering" trade of transporting coal and oil to fuelling stations consumed a considerable portion of shipping tonnage. As shipbuilding progressed to ever-larger ships, additional fuel storage capacity was incorporated into ship design that afforded greater range between refueling stops. Today most oceangoing vessels have the ability to fuel for an uninterrupted ocean crossing at their terminal locations before setting to sea.

== See also ==
- Coalinga, California
- Stage station
