= Prussian Navy =

Preußische Marine
- Active: 1701–1867
- Country: Kingdom of Prussia
- Type: Navy
- Engagements: Pomeranian War, Napoleonic Wars, First Schleswig War, Second Schleswig War, Austro-Prussian War

Insignia
- Naval ensign (1816–1819)

- Naval ensign (1819–1850)

The Prussian Navy (German: Preußische Marine), officially the Royal Prussian Navy (German: Königlich Preußische Marine), was the naval force of the Kingdom of Prussia from 1701 to 1867.

The Prussian Navy was created in 1701 from the former Brandenburg Navy after the elevation of Frederick I from Duke of Prussia to King in Prussia. The Prussian Navy fought in several wars but was active mainly as a merchant navy throughout the 18th and 19th centuries, as Prussia's military consistently concentrated on the Prussian Army. The Prussian Navy was dissolved in 1867 when Prussia joined the North German Confederation, and its naval forces were absorbed into the North German Federal Navy.

== Brandenburg Navy ==
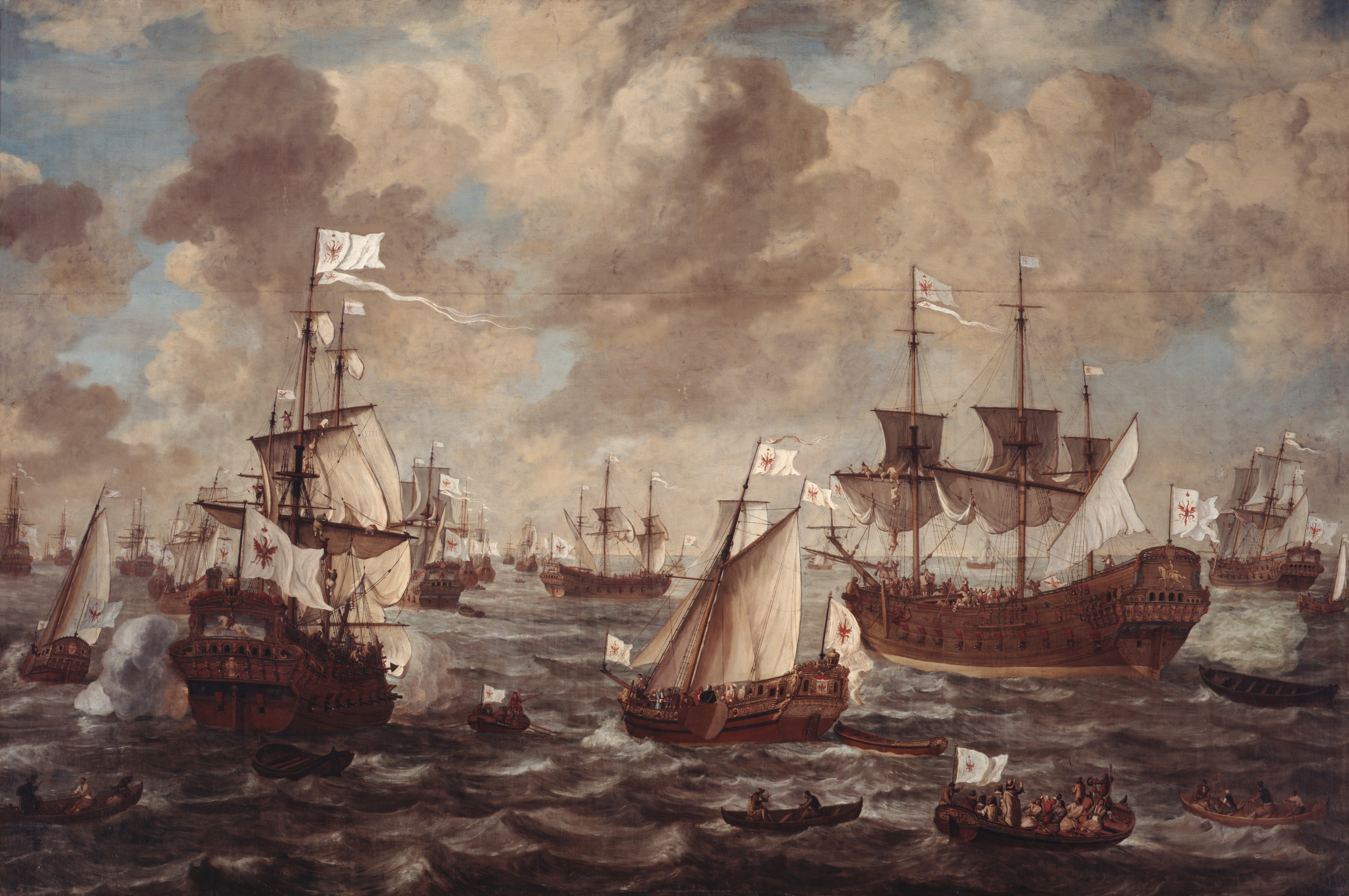
1684 painting of Brandenburg Navy ships

Brandenburg–Prussia, the predecessor of the Kingdom of Prussia, possessed its own navy, which was founded in the 16th century. From 1657 onwards, under Elector Frederick William (the "Great Elector"), Brandenburg's naval forces were developed into a blue-water navy. The Elector designated navigation and commerce as the most significant undertakings of his state, and strove energetically to acquire overseas colonies and become involved in the Atlantic slave trade; as such, a powerful navy was needed to defend these interests. However, his grandson Frederick William I held little interest in colonial affairs or maintaining a powerful navy, preferring to expend state revenues on the Prussian Army. In 1721, Frederick I sold the Brandenburger Gold Coast to the Dutch West India Company for 7,200 ducats and 12 African slaves, marking the end for any need by Prussia for a blue-water navy; the Prussian Navy subsequently dwindled in size.

== The 18th century ==
The Prussian kings of the 18th century had little interest in maintaining their own navy. Due to the state's continental position and the lack of easily defensible natural borders, Prussia had to concentrate its military preparations on the army. Besides this, the kingdom was able to rely on its many friendly connections with the neighboring naval powers of Denmark and the Netherlands.

Frederick II ("the Great") took the view that Prussia should never seek to develop its own war fleet. The kingdom could never hope to equal the great fleets of Britain, France, the Dutch Republic, Spain, Sweden, Denmark, and Russia; with their few ships, the Prussians would always remain behind those great maritime nations. He believed that naval battles would only rarely decide a conflict and preferred having the best army in Europe rather than the worst fleet among the naval powers.

Prussia nevertheless built up a small naval force of 13 makeshift warships (mixing of Galleys, Galiots and Gunboat) during the Seven Years' War. This embryonic fleet lost the battle of Frisches Haff in September 1759 to a Swedish naval force. The Prussians lost all ships and as a consequence the Swedes occupied Usedom and Wollin. However, the ships were replaced already in 1760, and the new flotilla served until the end of the war in 1763.

Even so, the Prussian monarch wanted to take part in international maritime commerce and therefore founded several trading firms (with varying success). The Emden Company (officially, Royal Prussian Asiatic Company in Emden to Canton and China) operated four ships from 1751 to 1757. The Societé de Commerce maritime, founded in 1772, exists today as a foundation named the Preußische Seehandlung (roughly translated as Prussian Maritime Enterprise).

== The 19th century ==
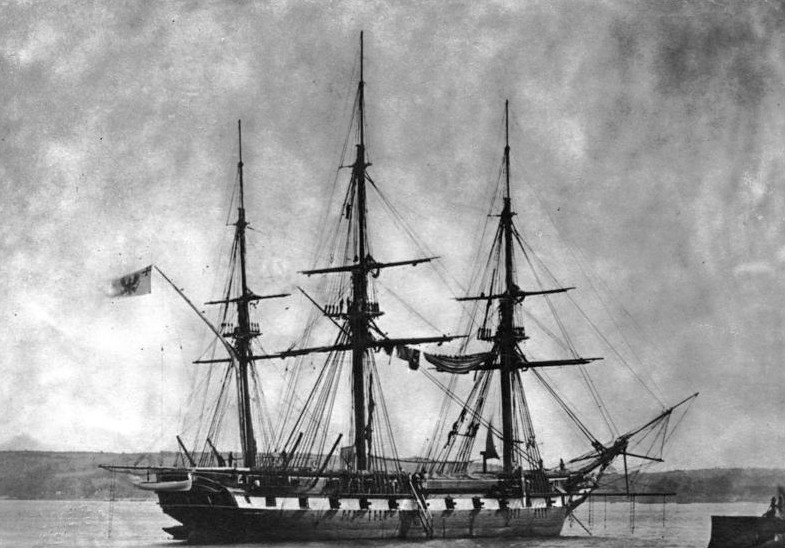
HMS Thetis, c. 1867

After the end of the Napoleonic Wars, Prussia slowly began to build its own small fleet for coastal defense. Again, more value was placed on the development of a merchant navy than on an actual navy. In this connection, the Prussian Maritime Enterprise played a significant role. Its ships were armed to protect against pirates and flew the Prussian war ensign. This protective fleet existed until around 1850.

One of the first to work for the development of a Prussian Navy was Prince Adalbert of Prussia. He had made a number of journeys abroad and recognized the value of a fleet to support commercial interests and to protect one's own navigation. During the Revolutionary era of 1848–1852, at the behest of the Frankfurt National Assembly, the prince was given the responsibility of reestablishing an Imperial Fleet (Reichsflotte) -- a mission which the revolutionary parliament had undertaken in the face of the war with Denmark.

The German Confederation possessed practically no fleet of its own, but relied upon the allied powers of Great Britain, the Netherlands, and Denmark. During the First War of Schleswig of 1848–1851, the failure of this strategy became clear because Great Britain and the Netherlands remained neutral and Denmark became the enemy. Within a few days, the Danish Navy halted all German maritime trade in the North and Baltic Seas. The navy of Austria, Prussia's ally, lay in the Mediterranean and was able to intervene only later in the war.

After the failure of the Revolutions of 1848, Adalbert was able to resume his plans for the establishment of a Prussian Navy. He began with the construction of warships and naval education and training. From the middle of the 1850s, one could find Prussian corvettes and frigates upon all the world's seas.

Besides Prince Adalbert, other important figures of this early period were Prussian naval officers Karl Rudolf Brommy and Ludwig von Henk, who eventually became an admiral in the Imperial German Navy.

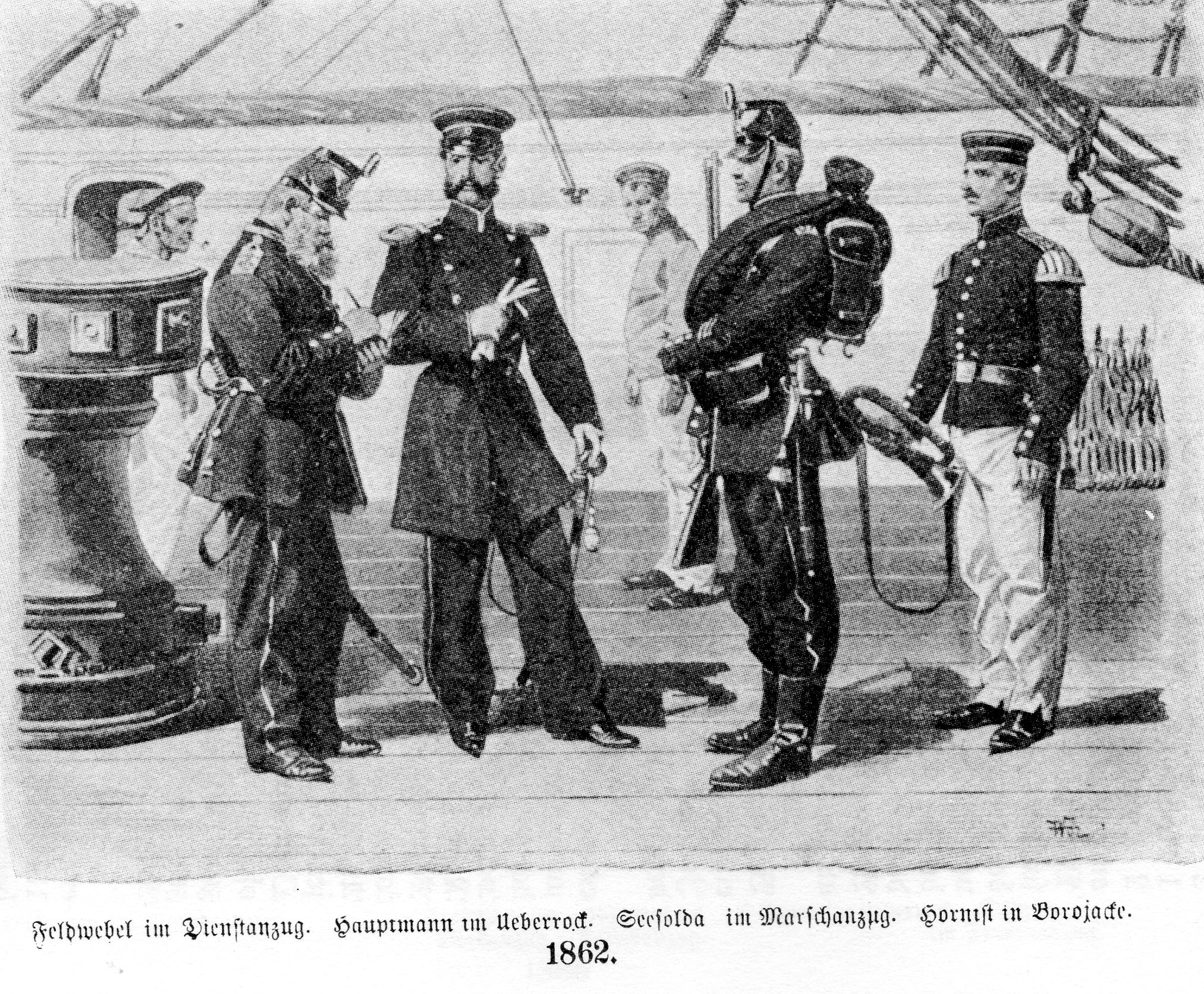
Preußische Marineinfanterie 1862.

For centuries, Brandenburg and Prussia had only access to the Baltic Sea coast. Since the 1850s, the first naval base was established on the North Sea. In the Jade Treaty (Jade-Vertrag) of 1853, the Grand Duchy of Oldenburg ceded to Prussia the so-called Jade District. Here, in the following years, arose the great naval port which received the name Wilhelmshaven after lengthy construction work, in 1869. By that time, a separate Prussian Navy had already ceased to exist as it evolved into the North German Federal Navy.

In the 1864 Second Schleswig War, Prussian seamen, with some help from Austria, fought numerically superior Danish Navy again in Jasmund and Heligoland, but without much naval success - unlike the Prussian army that gained control over Schleswig-Holstein and its ports.

After the Austro-Prussian War of 1866, the North German states had allied under Prussian leadership as the North German Confederation. Out of the Prussian Navy grew the North German Federal Navy, which after the Franco-Prussian War changed its name again to become the Imperial Navy of the new German Empire.

== Summary ==
Even though Prussia consistently understood itself as a continental land power, its rise and fall were closely bound up with the destiny of the Brandenburger-Prussian-German naval forces. It was the ambitious appearance of the Great Elector who prepared Brandenburg's elevation as the Kingdom of Prussia. At that time, sea power and colonies were among the essential attributes of a European power; such attributes also obviously belonged to smaller and middling powers such as Denmark and the Netherlands.

For 150 years Prussia — unlike all other European powers — declined to develop its own navy. Not until the 1848-1852 war against Denmark did Prussia recognize the necessity of having at least a minimal naval force to protect maritime interests. But after only 15 years, Prussia handed over its young naval forces to the rising centralized German state, an act which would have been unthinkable for the Prussian Army. The Navy was handed over first to the North German Confederation and in 1871, as the Imperial Navy, to the new German Empire.

The naval preference of the last Prussian king, German Emperor Wilhelm II, prepared the end of the Prussian monarchy. The German naval buildup of the late 19th and early 20th centuries was one of the causes of World War I; and it was the mutinying sailors of the High Seas Fleet who forced the abdication of the Emperor during the German Revolution of 1918–1919. The Navy continued as the Reichsmarine (Reich Navy) and later the Kriegsmarine (War Navy), until at the end of World War II, it faced its own end.

== Literature ==
- Henning Krüger: Zwischen Küstenverteidigung und Weltpolitik. Die politische Geschichte der Preußischen Marine 1848 bis 1867 (Between coastal defence and world policy. The political history of the Prussian navy 1848 to 1867), Bochum 2008, ISBN 978-3-89911-096-8.
- Gerhard Wiechmann: Die Königlich Preußische Marine in Lateinamerika 1851 bis 1867. Ein Versuch deutscher Kanonenbootpolitik in Übersee (The royal Prussian navy in Latin America 1851 to 1867. An attempt of German gunboat diplomacy in oversea), in: Sandra Carreras/Günther Maihold (ed.): Preußen und Lateinamerika. Im Spannungsfeld von Kommerz, Macht und Kultur, Münster 2004, p. 105-144.
- Cord Eberspächer: Die deutsche Yangtse-Patrouille. Deutsche Kanonenbootpolitik in China im Zeitalter des Imperialismus 1900 - 1914 (The German Yangtse Patrol. German gunboat diplomacy in China in the age of imperialism), Bochum 2004.
- Gerhard Wiechmann: Die preußisch-deutsche Marine in Lateinamerika 1866-1914. Eine Studie deutscher Kanonenbootpolitik (The Prussian-German Navy in Latin America 1866-1914. A study of German gunboat diplomacy 1866-1914), Bremen 2002, ISBN 3-89757-142-0.

== See also ==
- German Navy
- Prussian Army
