= Brandenburg Navy =

Navy of Brandenburg-Prussia (1657–1701)

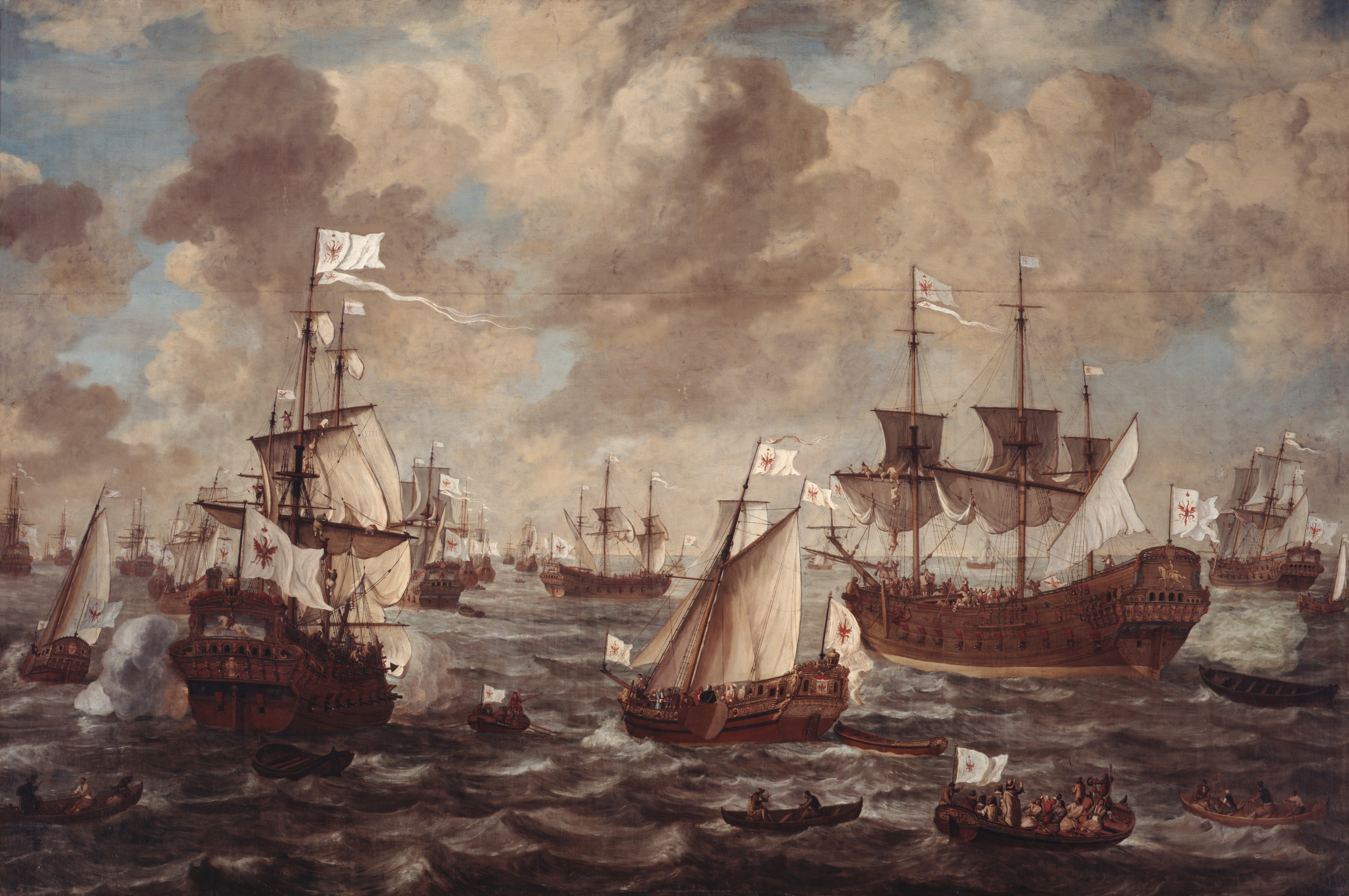
1684 painting of Brandenburg Navy ships

The Brandenburg Navy's ensign

The Brandenburg Navy was the navy of the Margraviate of Brandenburg and Brandenburg–Prussia from the 16th century to 1701, when it became part of the Prussian Navy.

The navy was originally assembled as the Hohenzollern rulers of Brandenburg began to increase in importance and to desire the prestige and security of having a suitable naval defence force. During the 17th century, the navy was of great use in numerous battles in the Baltic Sea, and it also served the interests of Brandenburg's colonies in Africa (specifically the Brandenburger Gold Coast) and the Caribbean. The navy also protected Brandenburg's involvement in the Atlantic slave trade, as the Brandenburger Gold Coast was used to transport between 17,000 and 30,000 enslaved Africans to the Americas between 1682 and 1721. By the year 1680, the Brandenburg Navy had almost thirty active warships. These ships were used primarily to secure control over hostile trade routes and maritime trading, as blockades and to provide naval defence, and to also provide reinforcement on various military operations, which would frequently involve engagements with unfriendly warships.

In 1682, Frederick William, the Great Elector, the prince-elector of Brandenburg, who was intensely involved in the navy's affairs, secured the navy a base at Greetsiel, but they shifted to Emden a year later. Frederick William died in 1688, and his descendants took no interest in the Brandenburg Navy. Frederick III and his grandson Frederick the Great recognized that they could never compete directly with the great maritime powers and concentrated instead on building the best army in Europe while maintaining good relations with naval powers such as Denmark and the Netherlands. The overseas colonies were eventually sold to the Dutch in 1721. In 1701, Frederick was crowned King in Prussia, marking a shift from Brandenburg to Prussia as the most important Hohenzollern realm. The Brandenburg Navy was consequently merged into the Prussian Navy that year.

== Ships in the Brandenburg Navy ==
List of ships in the Brandenburg Navy:

- Friedrich Wilhelm zu Pferde (frigate)
- Berlin (frigate)
- Dorothea (frigate)
- Rother Löwe (frigate)
- Carolus Secundus (frigate)
- Kurprinz von Brandenburg (frigate)
- Chur Prinz (frigate)
- Morian (frigate)
- Wappen von Brandenburg (frigate)
- Bracke (yacht)
- Große Jacht (yacht)
- Wasserhund (warship)
- Fuchs (warship)
- Einhorn (warship)
- Printz Ludwig (warship)
- Falke (warship)
- Jean Baptista (warship)
- Marie (warship)
- Spandau (warship)
- Stern (warship)
- Princesse Maria

== See also ==
- Military history of Germany

== Notes and references ==
Specific

General

- www.deutsche-schutzgebiete.de
- kurbrandenburgische marine

=== Literature ===
- Ulrich van der Heyden: Rote Adler an Afrikas Küste. Die brandenburgisch-preußische Kolonie Großfriedrichsburg in Westafrika. Berlin: Selignow-Verlag 2001, ISBN 3-933889-04-9
- Werner Rahn: Deutsche Marinen im Wandel: Vom Symbol nationaler Einheit zum Instrument internationaler Sicherheit, R. Oldenbourg Verlag, München 2005, ISBN 3-486-57674-7

This article is based on a translation of the corresponding article in the German Wikipedia.
