= Hanau-India =

Colonial project

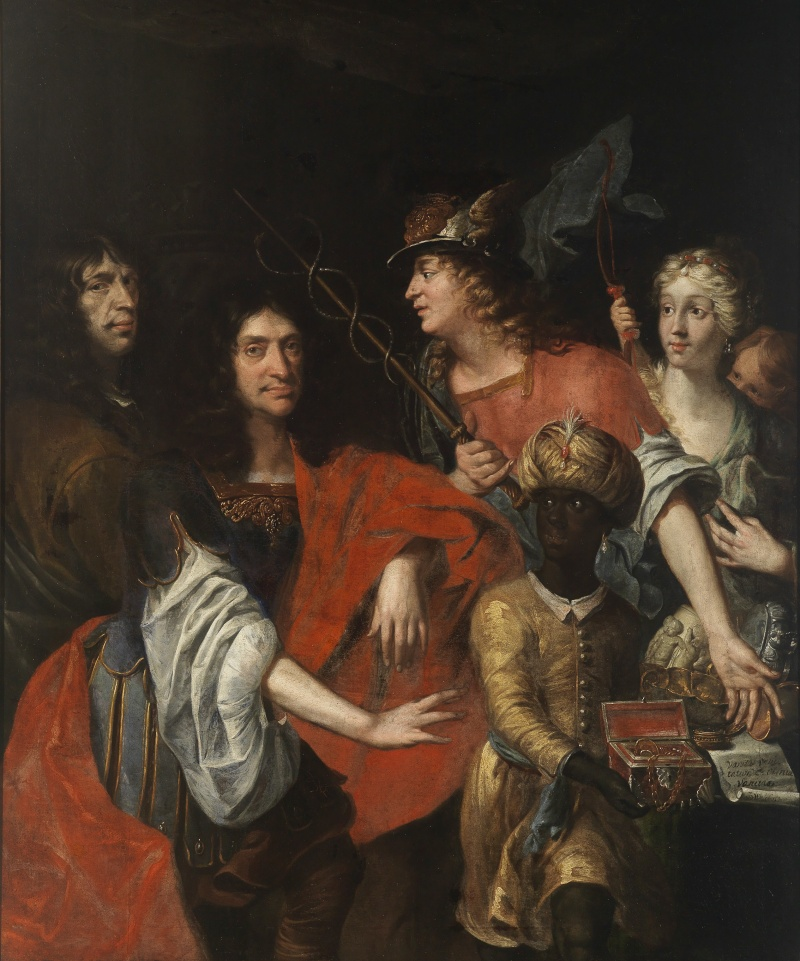
Johann David Welcker: Allegory on the acquisition of Hanau-India by Count Friedrich Kasimir of Hanau in 1669 (1676), Staatliche Kunsthalle Karlsruhe Inv.-Nr. 1164.

Hanau-India was the name of a colonial project agreed upon via treaty in 1669, but never realized, by the County of Hanau in present-day French Guiana , Suriname and northern Brazil .

== Background ==
The idea likely originated with Johann Daniel Crafft, who visited Guyana several times between 1656 and 1660. He presented the project in Mainz , but it met with little interest; however, he did meet Johann Joachim Becher . The idea of establishing an overseas colony was not unique. Other, similar projects, albeit on a smaller scale, were even partially implemented. Johann Joachim Becher had also negotiated a similar project with the Dutch West India Company (WIC) on behalf of the Bavarian court as early as 1664, but it did not come to fruition. He then introduced the project to Hanau . Count Friedrich Casimir of Hanau's goal was to achieve a positive trade balance with a colony in order to alleviate the financial difficulties of his county ( mercantilism ).

== The Contract ==
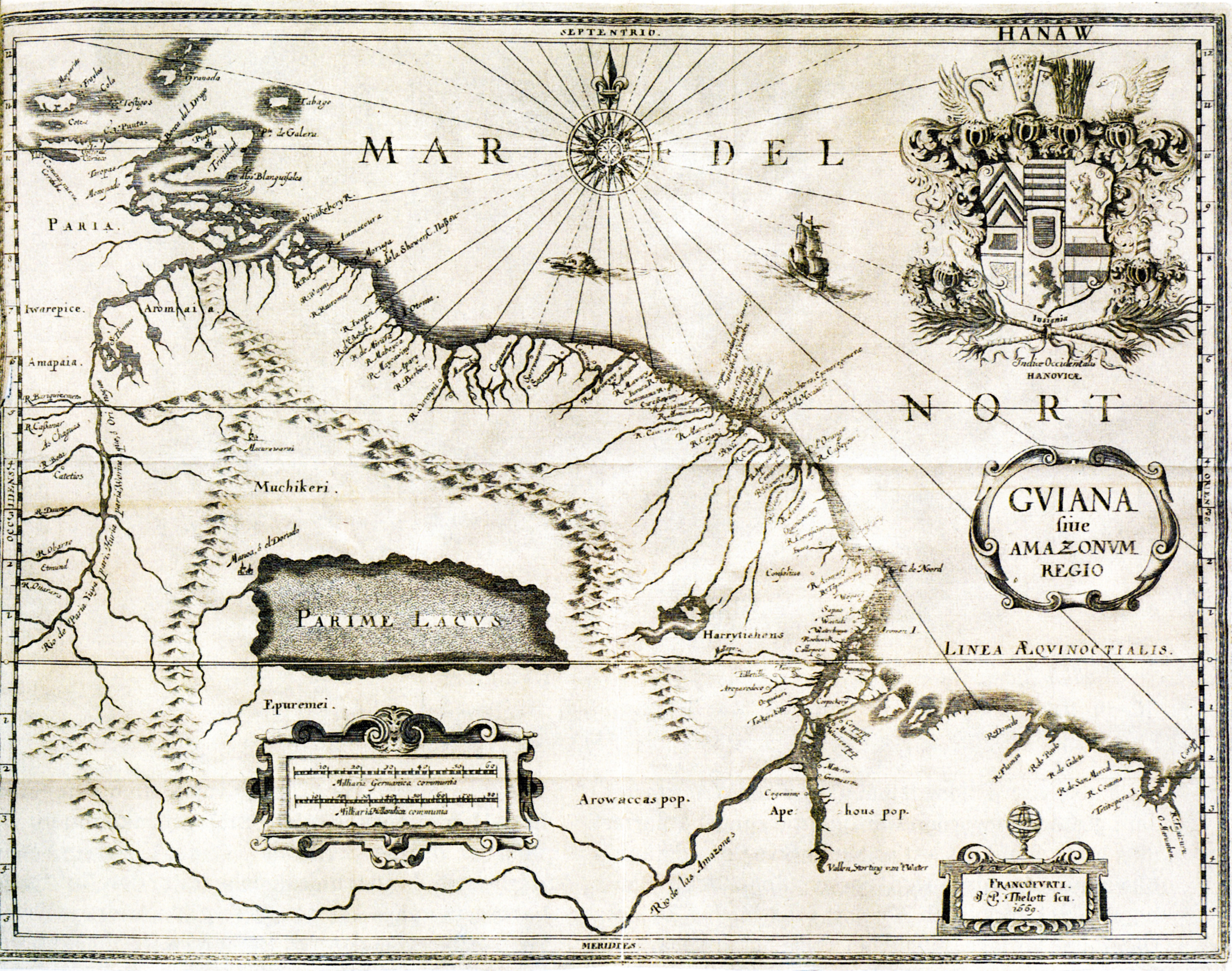
Historical map by Johann Philipp Thelott, 1669

Following prior contacts, a small delegation, commissioned by Count Friedrich Casimir and led by Johann Joachim Becher, traveled from Frankfurt am Main to Amsterdam on June 22, 1669, to begin negotiations with the West Indian Empire (WIC) regarding the colonial project. They arrived there on July 1, 1669. After negotiations on July 8 and 15, 1669, a treaty was concluded on July 29, 1669, which had already been approved by the States General on July 3, 1669. Johann Joachim Becher returned to Hanau on August 22, 1669. The treaty document was handed over in October 1669 to Johann Georg Seifert (from 1673: von Edelsheim ), who traveled to Amsterdam for this purpose.

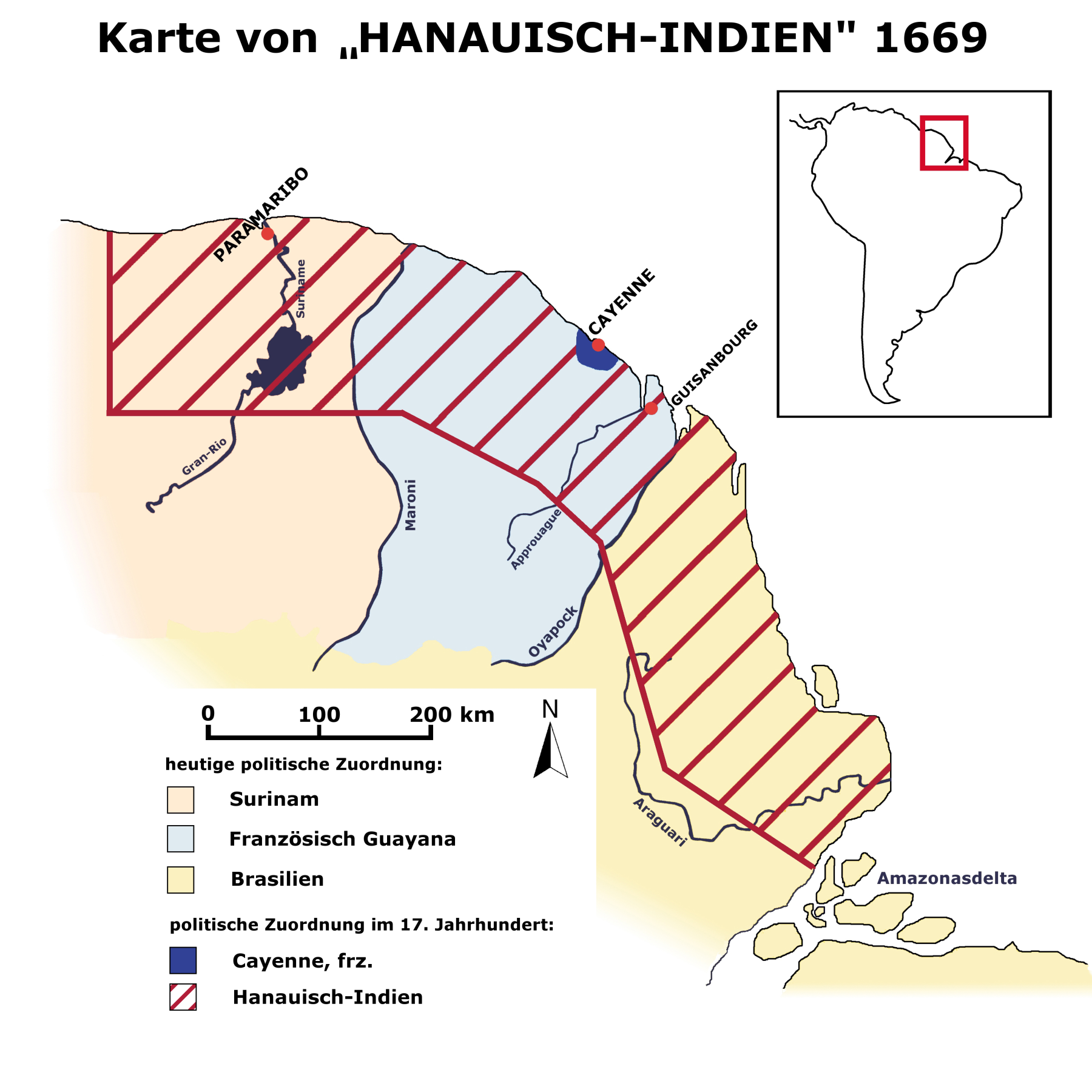
The territory of Hanauian India projected onto today's state borders

The treaty stipulated that Count Friedrich Casimir would receive an area of 3,000 Dutch square miles (almost 100,000 km^{2}) as a fief from the WIC . The area of the planned colony was far larger than the County of Hanau itself (approximately 44 Dutch square miles / just under 1,500 km^{2}). It was to be handed over upon the arrival of the first colonists. The plan was to establish the Kingdom of Hanau India there and to transform the inhabitants, referred to as Indians , into "friendly and civilized" people. The treaty granted extensive rights to the Dutch West India Company, such as a transport monopoly for traffic between Europe and the colony.

== Fate ==
From the outset, there was a lack of resources to finance such a project and a shortage of colonists to populate it. In fact, nothing was done after the treaty was signed with the West Indian Empire (WIC). The project was abandoned after Count Friedrich Casimir's partial disempowerment in 1670. It also failed due to the Franco-Dutch War . In 1672, Count Friedrich Casimir attempted to sell his colony to King Charles II of England , but it was met with no interest. Johann Wilhelm von Schröder acted as negotiator .
