= Emden Company =

Former German Charter Company

- Native name: Königlich Preußische Asiatische Compagnie in Emden nach Canton und China
- Formerly: Royal Prussian Asiatic Company in Emden to Canton and China
- Type: Trading company
- Industry: International trade
- Founded: May 24, 1751
- Founder: Frederick the Great
- Defunct: 1765
- Fate: Dissolved by Frederick the Great after the Seven Years' War and French occupation of Emden
- Headquarters: Emden, Prussia
- Area served: Primarily Canton, China
- Services: Trade
- Total equity: 861,000 thalers (1752) (1752)
- Owner: Shareholders (including Splitgerber & Daumin)

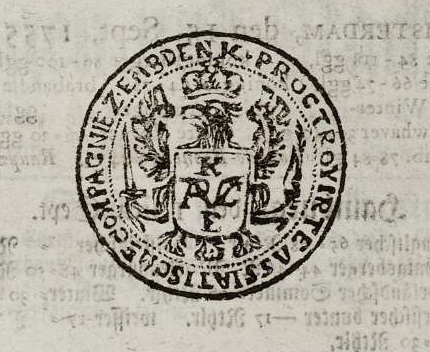
Official Seal of the Royal Prussian Asian Company

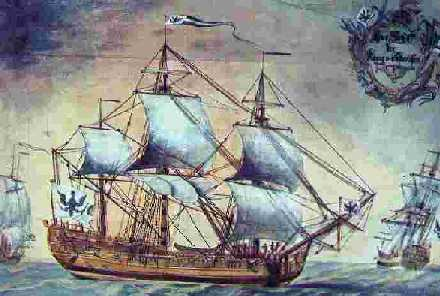
The Frigate King of Prussia based at Emden.

The Emden Company was a Prussian trading company which was established on 24 May 1751 to trade primarily with the city of Canton in China. Its full name was the Royal Prussian Asiatic Company in Emden to Canton and China (Königlich Preußische Asiatische Compagnie in Emden nach Canton und China), but it was generally known by the shorter name.

The company was made possible by the Prussian annexation of the port of Emden in 1744. This gave the Prussians a North Sea port. Frederick the Great established the company hoping to give Prussia a share of the valuable Asian trade similar to the British East India Company or the Dutch East India Company. There was great interest in the shares and 482 shares of 500 thaler (241,000 thaler in total) were subscribed on the day of foundation. One of the major shareholders was the banking and trading house Splitgerber & Daumin Berlin. The company had a capital of 861,000 thalers in 1752, distributed over 1,722 shares.

Although the small company was very successful, never losing any of its four ships, the business was destroyed by the outbreak of the Seven Years' War and the occupation of Emden by French troops in 1757 during the Invasion of Hanover. After the end of the war, Frederick dissolved the company in 1765. Throughout its existence, the company had sent sixteen trading ships to Canton, and upon its dissolution it managed to return the shareholders' initial capital along with a 2 percent dividend.

== See also ==
- Ostend Company
- Antwerp Company
- European chartered companies founded around the 17th century (in French)

== Bibliography ==
Simms, Brendan. Three Victories and a Defeat: The Rise and Fall of the First British Empire. Penguin Books, 2008.

Suebsman, Daniel. 'Chinese porcelain shipped by the Royal Prussian Asian Company of Emden. 1753-1756', in: Have a Cup of Tea! Chinese Porcelain and Tea in North-West Germany, Ostfriesisches Landesmuseum Emden, 2015.
