= Prussia (disambiguation) =

Prussia (German: Preußen) was a German state that formed the German Empire in 1871.

Prussia or Prussian may also refer to:

- Prussia (region), a historical region on the south-eastern coast of the Baltic Sea that lent its name to the later German state

== Countries ==
- State of the Teutonic Order (1230–1525), founded in the Prussian region by the Teutonic Order
- Prussian Confederation (1440–1466), an alliance of German Hanseatic cities in Prussia who rebelled against the Teutonic Knights
- Duchy of Prussia (1525–1618), a duchy established in the eastern part of Prussia
- Brandenburg-Prussia (1618–1701), a state created by the personal union of the Duchy of Prussia and the Margraviate of Brandenburg
- Kingdom of Prussia (1701–1918), a kingdom established in Brandenburg-Prussia; state in the German Empire after the unification of Germany

== Subdivisions ==
- Royal Prussia (1466–1772), a province of the Polish Crown, created by the separation of Prussia into two parts
- Province of Prussia (1829–1878), a province of the Kingdom of Prussia, created by a union of the Provinces of East and West Prussia
  - West Prussia (1773–1829; 1878–1919), a province of the Kingdom of Prussia, annexed from Poland in 1772 (former Royal Prussia)
  - East Prussia (1772–1829; 1878–1945), a province of the Kingdom of Prussia and the Free State of Prussia, created from former Ducal Prussia and Warmia in 1773; an exclave of Germany after World War I
- South Prussia (1793–1807), a province of the Kingdom of Prussia, annexed from Poland in 1793 and 1795 in the second and third partitions of Poland, respectively
- New East Prussia (1795–1807), a province of the Kingdom of Prussia, annexed from Poland in 1795 in the third partitions of Poland
- Free State of Prussia (1918–1947), a state of Germany after the abolition of the Kingdom of Prussia
  - Posen-West Prussia (1922–1938), a province of the Free State of Prussia (including the western parts of former West Prussia that were retained by Germany)
  - Regierungsbezirk West Prussia (1920–1938), administrative region of the Province of East Prussia (the eastern parts of former West Prussia that were retained by Germany)

== People and languages ==
- Prussians, an ethnic subgroup of Germans
  - Citizens of the state of Prussia
- Old Prussians, Baltic tribes formerly inhabiting the region of Prussia
- Old Prussian language, language of the Old Prussians, now extinct
- High Prussian, German dialect in East Prussia
- Low Prussian, German dialect in East Prussia

== Institutions ==
- Prussian Army, army of the Kingdom of Prussia
- Prussian Cultural Heritage Foundation, a foundation (est. 1957) holding museums and libraries left behind by the former Free State of Prussia
- Evangelical State Church in Prussia, a former Protestant church body under changing names (1817–2004)
- Prussian Navy, navy of the Kingdom of Prussia
- Prussian Military Academy
- Prussian Trust, German expellee company

== Cities ==
- Prussia in Saskatchewan, Canada, was renamed Leader in 1917.
- Prusia, near Pozuzo, Oxapampa, in the central jungle of Peru
- Prussia, Iowa, in the United States.
- King of Prussia, Pennsylvania, in the United States.

== Ships ==
- Prussia, a Hamburg America Line cargo steamship built in 1912

== See also ==
- Preußen (disambiguation)
- Preußisch (disambiguation)
- Borussia (disambiguation)
- Prussian blue (disambiguation)
- Russia (disambiguation)
