= Preußen =

Preußen or Preussen is the German word for Prussia.

It also refers to:

== Ships ==
- Preußen (ship), windjammer built in 1902
- SMS Preußen (1873), armored frigate
- SMS Preußen (1903), pre-dreadnought Battleship
- V 1101 Preußen, vorpostenboot

== Football ==
- BFC Preussen, football club in Berlin
- SC Preußen Münster, football club in Münster
- SV Viktoria Preußen 07, football club in Frankfurt
- Preußen Danzig, former football club in Danzig (Gdańsk)

== Other ==
- 5628 Preussen, asteroid
- Preußens Gloria, military song

== See also ==
- Preußisch (disambiguation)
- Prussia (disambiguation)
