= SMS Friedrich der Grosse =

SMS Friedrich der Grosse may refer to:

- SMS Friedrich der Grosse (1874), an armored frigate
- SMS Friedrich der Grosse (1911), a battleship

== See also ==
- Friedrich der Große (1896) or USS Huron (ID-1408), a passenger ship turned transport ship
