= SMS Preussen =

SMS Preussen (Ger.orth: Preußen) was the name of two vessels of the Imperial German Navy:

- SMS Preussen (1873), a turret ship
- SMS Preussen (1903), a battleship
