= Preussen-class ironclad =

Ironclad turret ship class of the German Imperial Navy

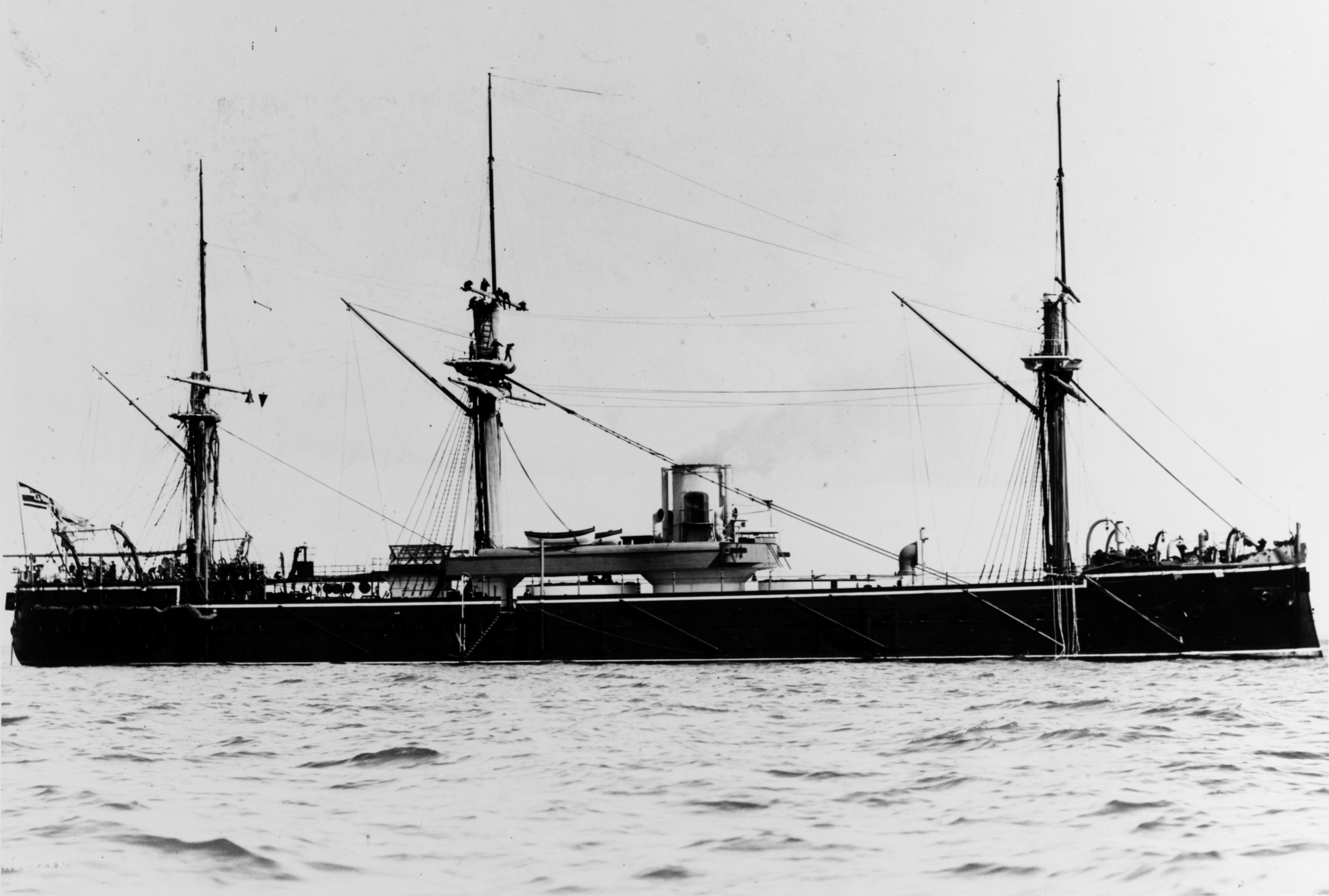
- Preussen in 1887

Class overview
- Builders: AG Vulcan; Kaiserliche Werft Kiel; Kaiserliche Werft Wilhelmshaven
- Operators: Imperial German Navy
- Preceded by: SMS Hansa
- Succeeded by: Kaiser class
- Built: 1868–1878
- In commission: 1876–1894
- Completed: 3
- Lost: 1
- Retired: 2

General characteristics
- Type: Turret ship
- Displacement: Design: 6,821 t (6,713 long tons); Full load: 7,718 t (7,596 long tons)
- Length: 96.59 m (316 ft 11 in)
- Beam: 16.30 m (53 ft 6 in)
- Draft: 7.11 m (23 ft 4 in)
- Installed power: 6 × boilers; 5,471 PS (5,396 ihp)
- Propulsion: 1 × Single-expansion steam engine; 1 × screw propeller
- Sail plan: Full-rigged ship
- Speed: 14 knots (26 km/h; 16 mph)
- Range: 1,690 nmi (3,130 km) at 10 kn (19 km/h)
- Complement: 46 officers; 454 enlisted men
- Armament: 4 × 26 cm (10 in) guns; 2 × 17 cm (6.7 in) guns
- Armor: Upper belt: 203 mm (8 in); Lower belt: 102 to 229 mm (4 to 9 in); Turrets: 203 to 254 mm (8 to 10 in)

The Preussen class of ironclad turret ships was a class of three ships built for the German Imperial Navy in the early 1870s. The lead ship, Preussen, was laid down in 1871 and launched in 1873. Friedrich der Grosse also was laid down in 1871 and launched in 1874. Grosser Kurfürst, although the first to be laid down, in 1869, was the last to be completed, launched in 1875. The ships served in the fleet starting in 1876, when Preussen was commissioned.

Grosser Kurfürst was lost in 1878 during maneuvers shortly after her commissioning, when a pair of small sailing boats crossed the bows of Grosser Kurfürst and König Wilhelm, which caused both ships to undertake emergency maneuvers. In the confusion, König Wilhelm collided with Grosser Kurfürst, causing the latter to sink. Both Preussen and Friedrich der Grosse served in the fleet until the 1890s, when they were relegated to secondary duties, including serving as harbor ships, and later as coal hulks. The ships were eventually scrapped following the end of World War I, in 1919 and 1920, respectively.

== Design ==
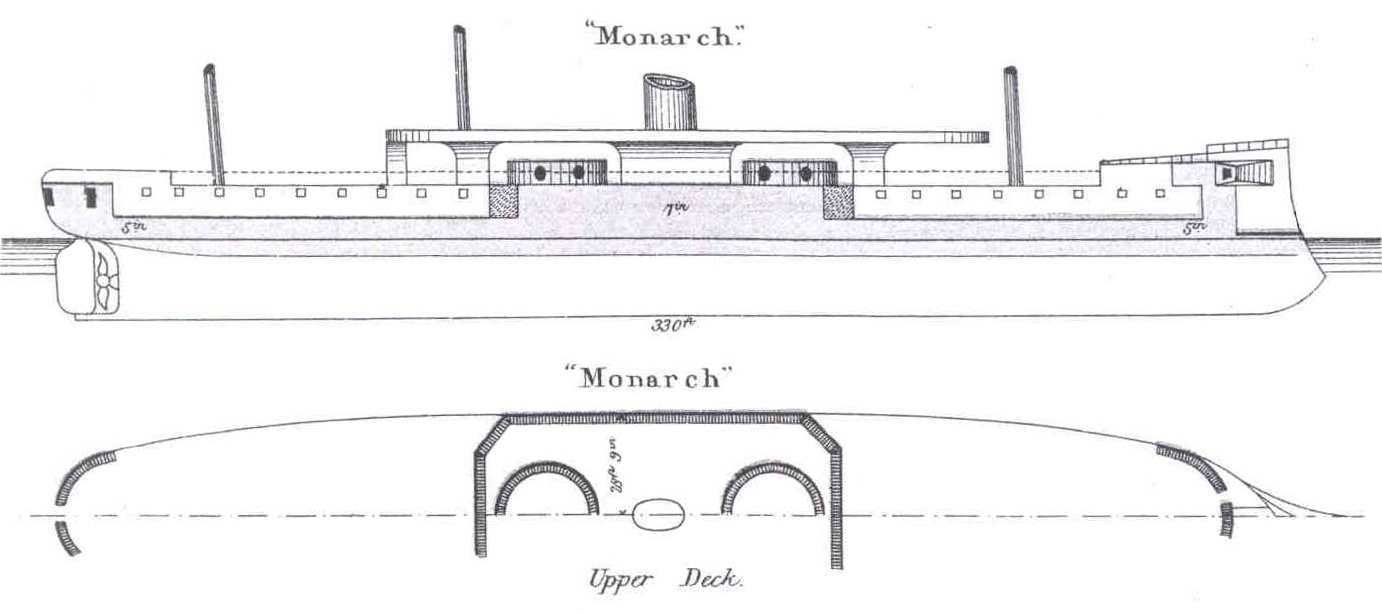
Plan and profile drawing of HMS Monarch, which strongly influenced the Preussen design

In 1867, the new North German Reichstag (Imperial Diet) approved a fleet plan that called for a fleet of sixteen ironclad warships (along with a number of other warships) by 1877. The ironclad fleet was intended to serve as a coastal defense force to prevent another blockade of German ports as had been conducted by the Danish Navy during the Second Schleswig War in 1864. By 1867, the Germans had acquired a pair of small ironclads—Arminius and Prinz Adalbert—and ordered three larger armored frigates—Friedrich Carl, Kronprinz, and König Wilhelm. All of these vessels were purchased from foreign shipbuilders, and in 1868 the first German-built warship, Hansa, was laid down. She was followed immediately by the Preussen class, which were to be the first uniform class of warships for the fleet.

The design for the Preussen class was prepared in 1868 under the direction of the Admiralitätsrat (Admiralty Council) by the chief designer, Carl Elbertzhagen. He had intended to build a casemate ship modeled on the Austro-Hungarian ironclad Custoza, which eschewed the traditional broadside arrangement for a smaller number of larger-caliber guns in a two-story casemate that was more flexible than a broadside battery. The first vessel, Grosser Kurfürst, was laid down according to this design, but while work was ongoing in 1869, Elbertzhagen redrafted the plan, creating a turret ship that mounted a pair of revolving twin-gun turrets of the type designed by Cowper Coles. The new vessel followed the same pattern as the British ironclad Monarch. Since the heavy turrets had to be mounted relatively low to prevent instability, a low freeboard was necessary, which reduced seakeeping. To remedy this deficiency, Elbertzhagen incorporated a built-up forecastle and sterncastle, with hinged bulwarks that could be raised while the ship was underway and lowered to employ the guns. The reworking of the design caused significant delays in construction of Grosser Kurfürst.

=== General characteristics ===
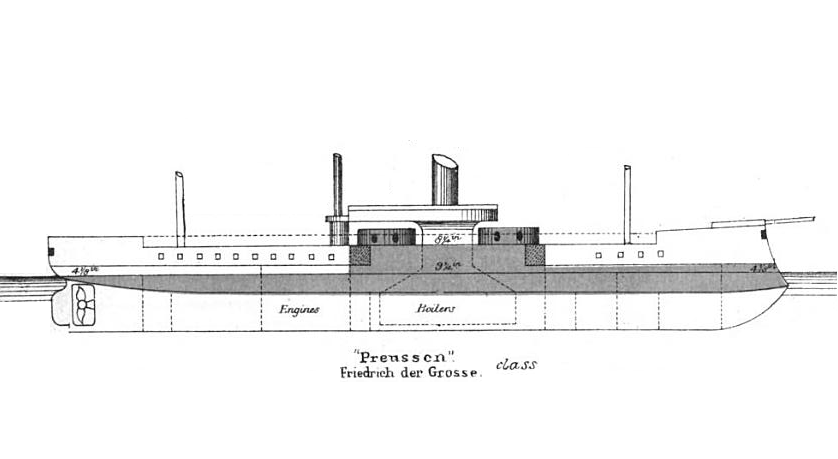
Profile drawing of a Preussen-class ironclad

The ships of the Preussen class were 94.50 m (310 ft) long at the waterline and 96.59 meters (316 ft 11 in) long overall. They had a beam of 16.30 m (53 ft 6 in) and a draft of 7.12 m (23 ft 4 in) forward and 7.18 m (23 ft 7 in) aft. As designed, the vessels displaced 6,821 metric tons (6,713 long tons). When the vessels were fully loaded, they displaced 7,718 t (7,596 long tons). Their hulls were built with transverse and longitudinal iron frames; iron plating covered teak backing. The ships had twelve watertight compartments and a double bottom that ran for 60 percent of the length of the hull.

The German navy regarded the ships as good sea boats, very sensitive to commands from the helm, and with a gentle motion. The ships had a tight turning radius, but were crank and slow while under sail. Their standard complement consisted of 46 officers and 454 enlisted men. The ships carried a number of smaller boats, including one picket boat, two launches, one pinnace, two cutters, two yawls, and two dinghies.

The three ships were powered by one 3-cylinder single expansion engine; Preussen's engine was built by AG Vulcan, while Friedrich der Grosse and Grosser Kurfürst were equipped with engines manufactured by F A Egells of Berlin. The ships' engines drove a single four-bladed screw that was 6.60 m (21 ft 8 in) in diameter. The engines were supplied with steam by six coal-fired transverse trunk boilers, which were provided by the Imperial Dockyard in Wilhelmshaven. The six boilers were trunked into a single large, retractable funnel amidships. She was also equipped with a full ship rig. Three generators provided 30 kilowatts of electrical power. The ships' top speed was 14 knots (26 km/h; 16 mph), at 5,471 metric horsepower (5,396 ihp). The ships were capable of storing 564 t (555 long tons; 622 short tons) of coal; this enabled the ships to steam for 1,690 nautical miles (3,130 km; 1,940 mi) at a cruising speed of 10 knots (19 km/h; 12 mph).

=== Armament and armor ===
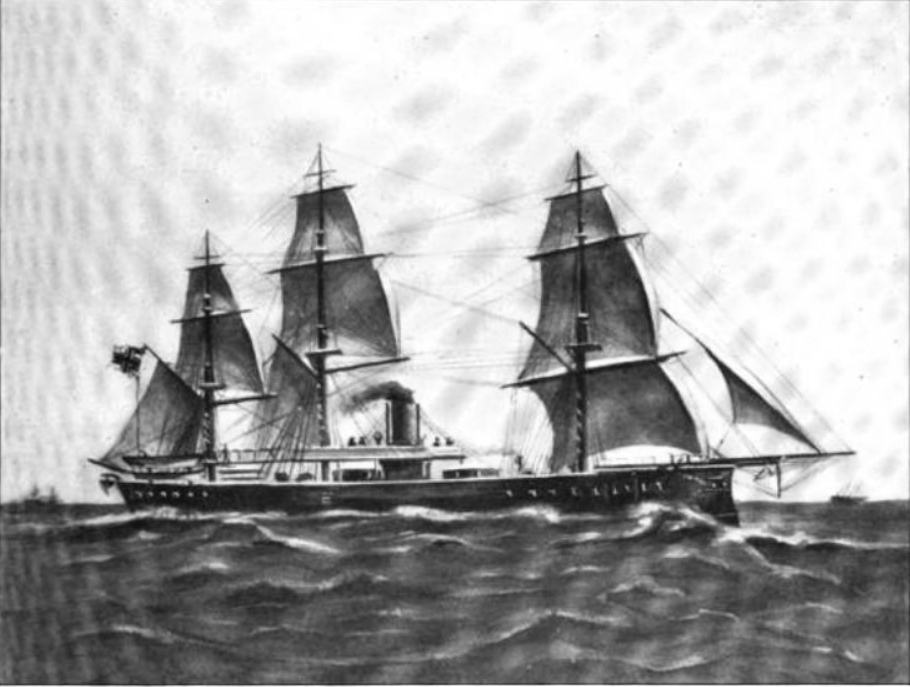
SMS Grosser Kurfürst under sail before her loss

The Preussen class ships were armed with a main battery of four 26 cm RK L/22 guns. These were originally built with a 26-centimeter (10.2 in) caliber. When it became known that shallower grooves (see rifling) were better, the existing gun barrels were bored up. Therefore, the actual caliber became 26.3-centimeter (10.4 in). These four guns were mounted in a pair of steam-powered twin-gun turrets placed amidships. The turrets were mounted on what would have been the battery deck. These guns were supplied with 400 rounds of ammunition. They could depress to −3° and elevate to 11°; this enabled a maximum range of 5,000 m (5,500 yd).

Since the fore and sterncastles blocked fire directly ahead or astern, the ships were also equipped with two 17 cm (6.7 in) RK L/25 chase guns, one on either end of the vessel. Two hundred rounds of ammunition were supplied to these guns. As with the 26 cm guns, the 17 cm weapons could elevate to 11° for a maximum range of 5,000 m.

Between 1889 and 1891, Preussen and Friedrich der Grosse were rebuilt and their armament was significantly augmented. Six and later ten 8.8 cm (3.5 in) SK L/30 quick-firing guns were installed, supplied with up to 2,500 rounds of ammunition. Two auto-cannons were added as well. Both ships also had five 35 cm (14 in) torpedo tubes added: Preussen's tubes were installed in the hull, underwater, while Friedrich der Grosse's tubes were placed above water. Both ships had a stock of 13 torpedoes.

The ships' armor was made of wrought iron and backed with teak. The armored belt was arrayed in two strakes. The upper strake was 203 mm (8.0 in) thick; the lower strake ranged in thickness from 102 to 229 mm (4.0 to 9.0 in). Both were backed with 234 to 260 mm (9.2 to 10.2 in) of teak. Their forward conning towers were protected with 30 mm (1.2 in) thick sides and 50 mm (2.0 in) thick slopes. The gun turrets had 25 mm (0.98 in) thick roofs and curved sides varying in thickness between 203 to 254 mm (8.0 to 10.0 in) backed with 260 mm (10 in) thick teak; the thicker armor was located on the fronts of the turrets, where they would be more likely to suffer hits, while the sides and rears received thinner protection.

== Construction ==
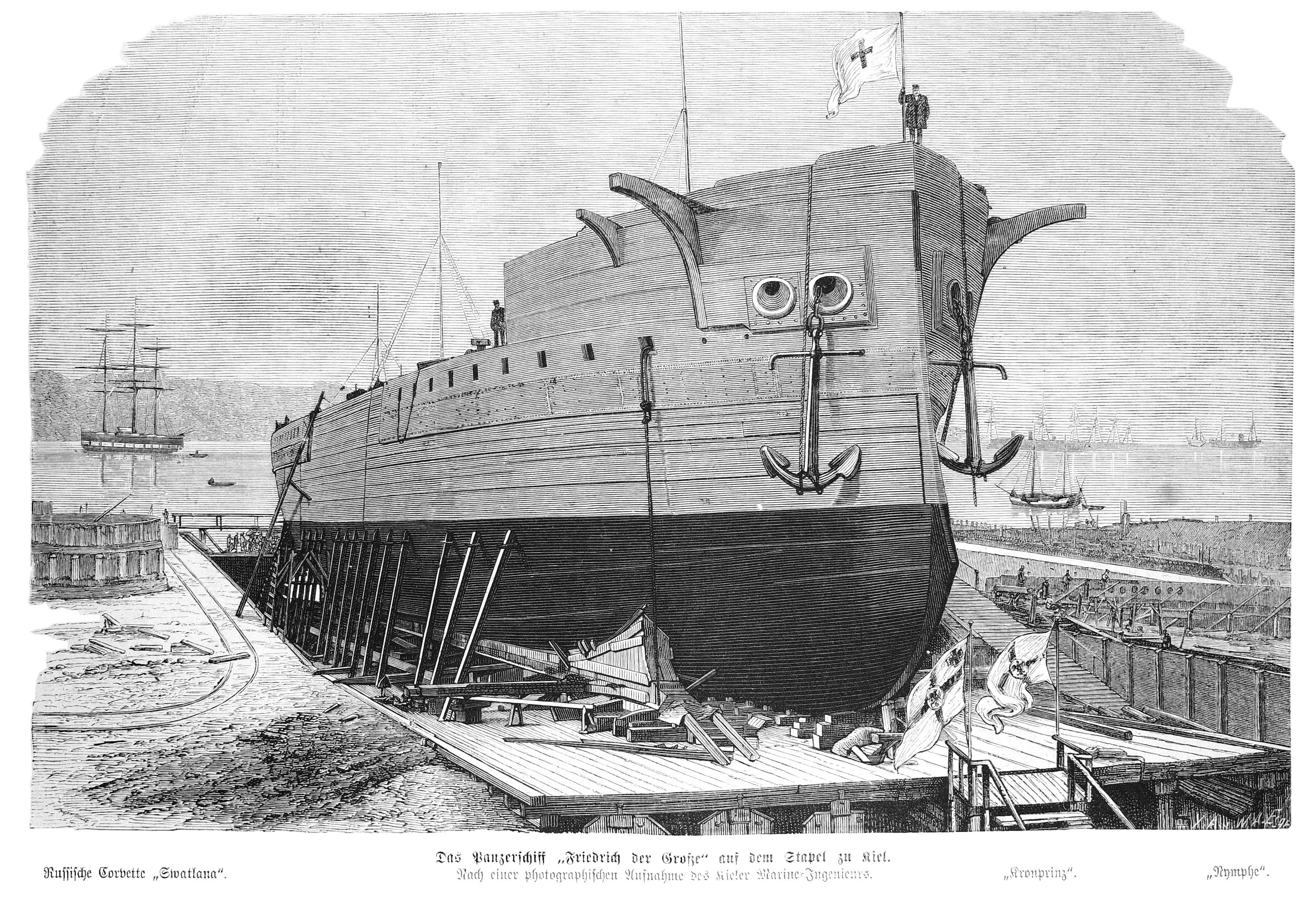
Friedrich der Grosse under construction in 1874

Grosser Kurfürst was laid down first in 1869, followed by the other two members of the class in 1871. Grosser Kurfürst and Friedrich der Grosse were built by the recently established (and thus inexperienced) imperial shipyards; the former by the Kaiserliche Werft in Wilhelmshaven and the latter by the Kaiserliche Werft in Kiel. Preussen was instead ordered from the private AG Vulcan shipyard in Stettin. Though begun two years before her sister ships, Grosser Kurfürst was completed last, owing to a combination of redesigning the ship after work began and the inexperience of the imperial dockyards. She was under construction for ten years, compared to eight for Friedrich der Grosse and just six for Preussen.

Ship Name	Builder	Laid Down	Launched	Commissioned
Grosser Kurfürst	Kaiserliche Werft, Wilhelmshaven	1869	17 September 1875	6 May 1878
Preussen	AG Vulcan, Stettin	1871	22 November 1873	4 July 1876
Friedrich der Grosse	Kaiserliche Werft, Kiel	1871	20 September 1874	22 November 1877

== Service history ==
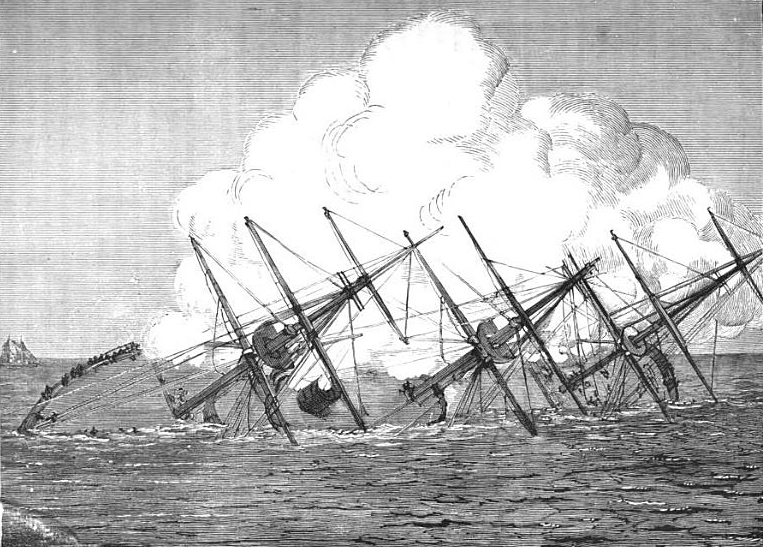
Grosser Kurfürst sinking in the English Channel

After her commissioning in July 1876, Preussen served with the fleet. She joined a squadron sent to the Mediterranean Sea in 1877 in response to unrest in the Ottoman Empire related to the Russo-Turkish War; the violence threatened German citizens living there. The squadron, under the command of Rear Admiral Carl Ferdinand Batsch, steamed to the ports of Haifa and Jaffa in July 1877, but found no significant tensions ashore. Batsch then departed and cruised the Mediterranean for the remainder of the summer, returning to Germany in October.

By May 1878, all three Preussen-class ships were ready for the annual summer maneuvers of the armored squadron. The three ships were joined by the large armored frigate König Wilhelm, and operated under the command of Rear Admiral Batsch. Friedrich der Grosse missed the maneuvers after running aground off Nyborg, leaving Batsch just three vessels. While steaming in the English Channel on 31 May, König Wilhelm accidentally rammed Grosser Kurfürst; the latter quickly sank with the loss of between 269 and 284 men. (Note: Figures for the number of fatalities vary. Erich Gröner reports that out of a crew of 500 men, 269 died in the accident, while Lawrence Sondhaus states that 276 men were killed. Aidan Dodson states that 284 were killed in the sinking.) Her loss spurred a series of investigations into the circumstances of the collision, which ultimately resulted in the acquittal of both Batsch, the squadron commander, and Count Alexander von Monts, the captain of Grosser Kurfürst. Political infighting over the affair led to ouster of Rear Admiral Reinhold von Werner from the navy.

Preussen and Friedrich der Grosse remained in the armored squadron for the training cruises starting in 1879 through 1883, when they were put into reserve and replaced by newer vessels, including the four Sachsen-class ironclads. The two ships were reactivated in 1889 to participate in cruises following the coronation of Kaiser Wilhelm II. These included a state visit to Great Britain in August 1889 and a tour of the Mediterranean in the winter of 1889–1890. The two ships resumed their duties in the training cycles into the early 1890s. Although Preussen was withdrawn from active service in 1891, Friedrich der Grosse continued to serve until the end of 1894. Upon leaving active duty, both ships were used in secondary roles as harbor ships and later as coal hulks for torpedo boats. They were both ultimately sold for scrapping in 1919 following the end of World War I. Both vessels were broken up by 1920.
