= Woodwren =

Woodwren or wood-wren may refer to:-

== Birds ==
- wrens in the genus Henicorhina

== Ships ==
- SS Woodwren, a British coaster in service 1947-53
