= SMS Friedrich der Grosse (1874) =

Ironclad turret ship of the German Imperial Navy

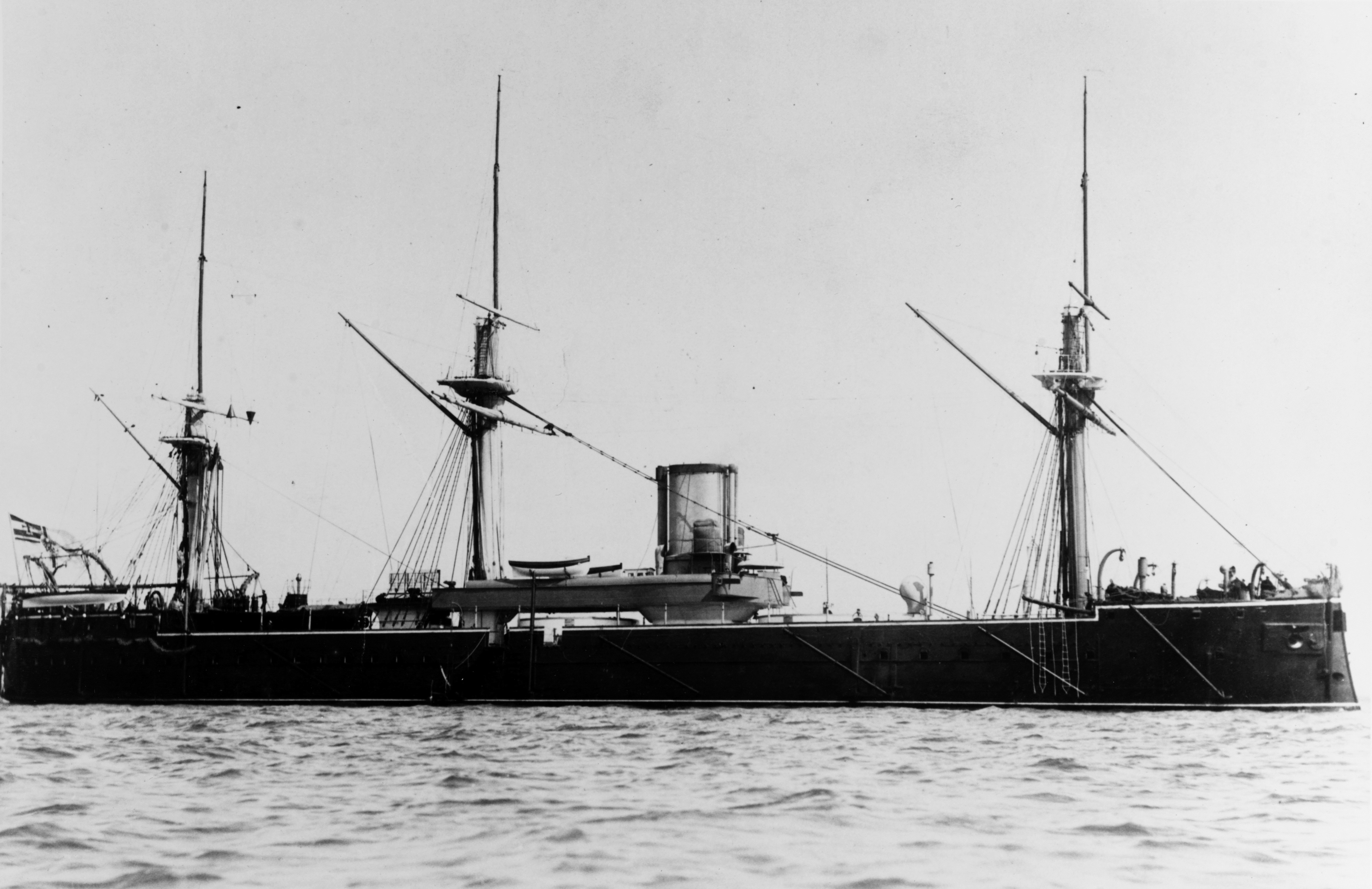
- Friedrich der Grosse in 1887

History
- Name: SMS Friedrich der Grosse
- Namesake: King Frederick the Great
- Builder: Kaiserliche Werft, Kiel
- Laid down: 15 April 1871
- Launched: 20 September 1874
- Commissioned: 22 November 1877
- Decommissioned: 12 October 1894
- Stricken: 21 January 1919
- Fate: Scrapped, 1920

General characteristics
- Class & type: Preussen-class ironclad
- Displacement: Design: 6,821 t (6,713 long tons); Full load: 7,718 t (7,596 long tons)
- Length: 96.59 m (316 ft 11 in)
- Beam: 16.30 m (53 ft 6 in)
- Draft: 7.11 m (23 ft 4 in)
- Installed power: 6 × boilers; 4,998 PS (4,930 ihp)
- Propulsion: 1 × Single-expansion steam engine; 1 × screw propeller
- Sail plan: Full-rigged ship
- Speed: 14 knots (26 km/h; 16 mph)
- Range: 1,690 nmi (3,130 km) at 10 kn (19 km/h)
- Complement: 46 officers; 454 enlisted men
- Armament: 4 × 26 cm (10 in) guns; 2 × 17 cm (6.7 in) guns
- Armor: Upper belt: 203 mm (8 in); Lower belt: 102 to 229 mm (4 to 9 in); Turrets: 203 to 254 mm (8 to 10 in)

SMS Friedrich der Grosse (Note: "SMS" stands for "Seiner Majestät Schiff", or "His Majesty's Ship".) (or Große (Note: This is the German "sharp S"; see ß.)) was an ironclad turret ship built for the German Kaiserliche Marine (Imperial Navy). She was the second of three Preussen-class ironclads, in addition to her two sister-ships Preussen and Grosser Kurfürst. Named for Frederick the Great, she was laid down at the Imperial Dockyard in Kiel in 1871 and completed in 1877. Her main battery of four 26 cm (10 in) guns was mounted in a pair of twin gun turrets amidships.

Friedrich der Grosse served with the fleet from her commissioning until 1896, though she was frequently placed in reserve throughout her career. The ship was a regular participant in the annual fleet training maneuvers, except in the mid-1880s when she was temporarily replaced by newer vessels. She participated in several cruises in the Baltic and Mediterranean Seas, often escorting Kaiser Wilhelm II on official state visits. The ship was removed from active service in 1896, after which she was used in secondary roles until 1919, then stricken from the naval register, sold to a scrapyard, and broken up for scrap the following year.

== Design ==
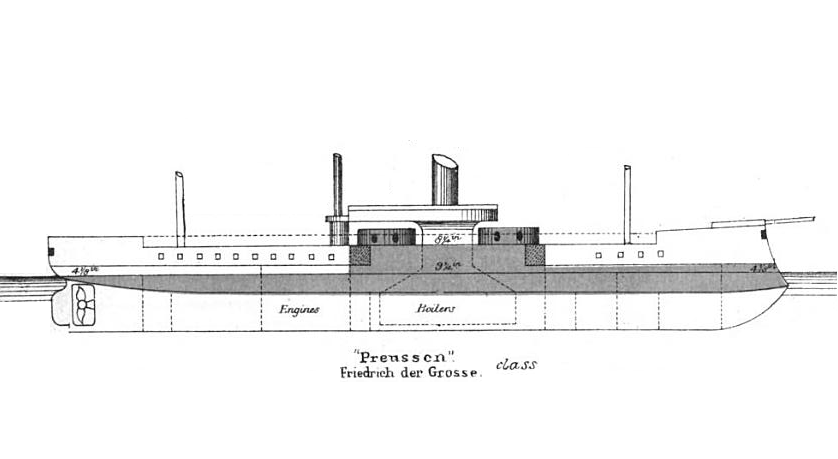
Line-drawing of Friedrich der Grosse

The three Preussen-class ironclads were authorized under the naval program of 1867, which had been approved by the Reichstag (Imperial Diet) to strengthen the North German Federal Navy in the wake of the Second Schleswig War, when the weak, then-Prussian Navy had been unable to break the blockade imposed by the Danish Navy. Initially ordered as casemate ships, the vessels were re-designed as turret ships; they were the first uniform class of ironclads built by for the German fleet.

Friedrich der Grosse was 96.59 meters (316.9 ft) long overall and had a beam of 16.30 m (53.5 ft) and a draft of 7.12 m (23.4 ft) forward. Friedrich der Grosse was powered by one 3-cylinder single expansion steam engine, which drove a single screw propeller. Steam was supplied by six coal-fired transverse trunk boilers, which were vented into a single funnel. The ship's top speed was 14 knots (26 km/h; 16 mph), at 4,998 metric horsepower (4,930 ihp). She was also equipped with a full ship rig. Her standard complement consisted of 46 officers and 454 enlisted men.

She was armed with a main battery of four 26 cm (10.2 in) L/22 guns mounted in a pair of gun turrets placed on the centerline amidships. (Note: "L/22" denotes the length of the gun in terms of caliber. A 22-caliber gun is 22 times as long as it is wide in diameter, so a 26 cm L/22 gun is 572 cm (225 in) long.) As built, the ship was also equipped with two 17 cm (6.7 in) RK L/25 chase guns, one in the bow and one in the stern. After being rebuilt in 1888–1890, her armament was increased by six and later ten 8.8 cm (3.5 in) L/30 quick-firing guns, a pair of machine guns, and five 35 cm (14 in) torpedo tubes in the ship's hull below the waterline.

Friedrich der Grosse's armor was made of wrought iron and backed with teak. The armored belt was arrayed in two strakes. The upper strake was 203 mm (8 in) thick; the lower strake ranged in thickness from 102 to 229 mm (4 to 9 in). Both were backed with 234 to 260 mm (9.2 to 10.2 in) of teak. The gun turrets were protected by 203 to 254 mm (8 to 10 in) armor on the sides, backed by 260 mm of teak.

== Service history ==
=== Construction – 1881 ===
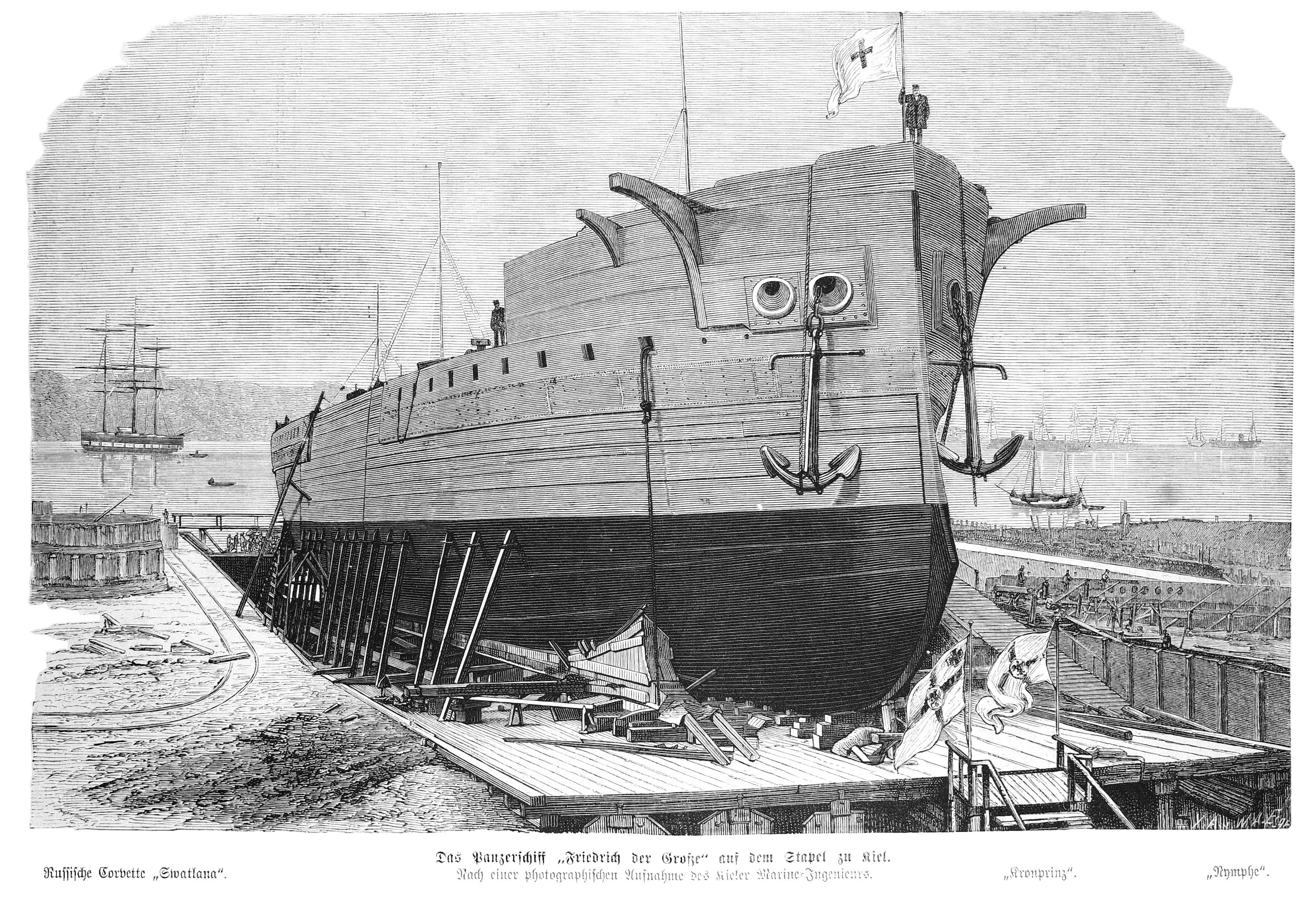
Friedrich der Grosse under construction

Friedrich der Grosse was ordered by the Imperial Navy from the Königliche Werft (Royal Dockyard) in Kiel on 9 January 1870, but the beginning of construction was delayed by the Franco-Prussian War that broke out later that year. The ship's keel was laid down on 15 April 1871 under construction number 1. The ship, named for the Prussian king Frederick the Great, was launched on 20 September 1874, and at the launching ceremony, Kaiser Wilhelm I christened the ship. She was commissioned to begin sea trials on 22 November 1877. Although laid down a year before her sister Preussen, Friedrich der Grosse was not completed until a year after; this was because she was built at a newly established and inexperienced Imperial Dockyard, while Preussen was built by AG Vulcan, an experienced private shipbuilder.

Her initial testing was carried out in the Baltic Sea, but trials were interrupted in early January 1878, when Friedrich der Grosse was transferred to Wilhelmshaven, where she was placed in reserve with a reduced crew under the command of Korvettenkapitän (Corvette Captain) Gustav Stempel. Here, final fitting out was completed, after which she resumed trials, which concluded on 19 May in Kiel. At that time, Kapitän zur See (KzS—Captain at Sea) Paul von Reibnitz relieved Stempel as the ship's commander. The month before, Friedrich der Grosse was assigned to the Ironclad Training Squadron to participate in the annual summer fleet maneuvers, under the command of Konteradmiral (Rear Admiral) Carl Ferdinand Batsch. Her newly commissioned sister-ship, Grosser Kurfürst, joined the squadron shortly before maneuvers were scheduled to begin. At the time, Friedrich der Grosse suffered from mechanical problems, and on 22 May, while steaming in bad weather from Kiel to Wilhelmshaven, she ran aground off Nyborg. The ship had to be towed free, and suffered serious damage to her hull, including a 60 m (200 ft) long gash in the outer skin of her double bottom. The damage, coupled with her chronic engine problems, forced her to miss the fleet maneuvers, which were cancelled soon after following the accidental sinking of her sister Grosser Kurfürst in a collision with the ironclad König Wilhelm. Friedrich der Grosse was decommissioned for repairs on 8 June.

In the aftermath of the loss of Grosser Kurfürst, the Navy canceled the summer 1878 maneuvers. Apart from the small ironclad Hansa, all armored warships were put in reserve until the following year. In May 1879, the armored squadron was reactivated, under the command of Konteradmiral Franz Kinderling. Friedrich der Grosse was recommissioned, still under Reibnitz's command on 5 May to join the unit, which also included Preussen and the older ironclads Friedrich Carl and Kronprinz. The squadron remained in the Baltic for the majority of the training period. Kinderling took his four ships out into the North Sea in June for a visit to Norway. While leaving Kiel on 23 June, Friedrich der Grosse lost one of her propellers. The four ships returned to Kiel in September, when the squadron was disbanded for the winter. The ships were visited by the Kaiser on 19 September, and Friedrich der Grosse was decommissioned six days later.

In the spring of 1880, the squadron was again reestablished, and Friedrich der Grosse was recommissioned to join it on 3 May; Reibnitz served a third stint as the ship's captain. She briefly conducted sea trials, beginning on 13 May, before joining the rest of the squadron on the 24th. The new armored corvette Sachsen replaced Kronprinz in the squadron that year. Wilhelm von Wickede, a former Austrian naval officer, replaced Kinderling as the squadron commander. In June, the Italian screw corvette Cristoforo Colombo visited the armored squadron in Kiel. Again, the squadron remained in the Baltic for the summer cruise, with the exception of a short visit to Wilhelmshaven and Cuxhaven in August. The year's training activities included battle practice in the western Baltic, followed by large-scale maneuvers in the North and Baltic Seas. The ship was decommissioned for the winter and recommissioned for the 1881 training cycle on 3 May. KzS Eduard von Knorr became the ship's captain at that time. The summer cruise that year followed the same pattern as the previous year, though Kronprinz returned in place of Sachsen, which was plagued with engine problems. Wickede again served as the commander. In July, the ships hosted a visit by the British reserve squadron, which by this time included the first British ironclad, HMS Warrior. Preussen and the rest of the squadron visited Danzig in September during a meeting between Kaiser Wilhelm I and the Russian Tsar Alexander III. Friedrich der Grosse was thereafter transferred from Kiel to Wilhelmshaven, where she joined the North Sea Naval Station, being decommissioned there on 30 September.

=== 1882–1919 ===
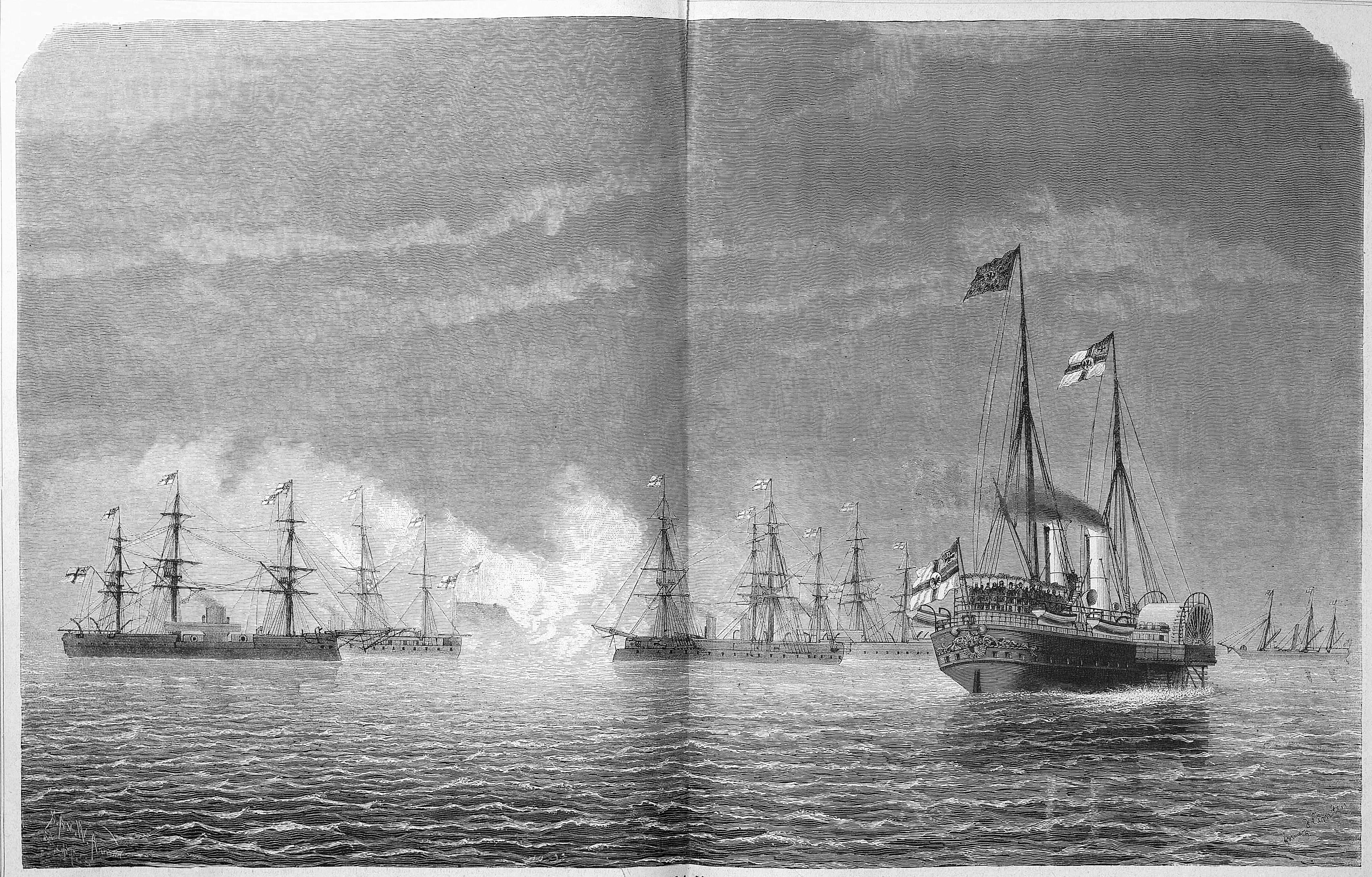
Illustration of the fleet conducting maneuvers, including Friedrich der Grosse and several other ironclads and other vessels

The 1882 training year followed a similar pattern to previous years; the ship was recommissioned on 2 May, again under Knorr's command. The summer cruise included the same four ironclads from the previous year, and was again commanded by Wickede, who had by then been promoted to Konteradmiral. Friedrich der Grosse was kept in reserve during the annual summer maneuvers starting in 1883, as new ships, including the rest of the Sachsen-class ironclads entered service. From 1883 to 1885, the ship underwent a modernization that included new boilers and a reconstructed poop deck. Two 37 mm (1.5 in) Hotchkiss guns and five torpedo tubes were added in above-water mounts. During this period, the ship was commanded by KzS Bartholomäus von Werner to undergo periodic sea trials as work on the ship was carried out. The ship was reactivated on 6 April 1888 to participate in the year's training activities. After conducting trials in the Jade Bay, before join the rest of the squadron in Kiel on 22 May. The ships embarked on a tour of the Baltic for the newly enthroned Kaiser Wilhelm II in July, by which time KzS Ernst von Reiche took command of the ship. The voyage included visits to St. Petersburg, Stockholm, and Copenhagen. They met Alexander III and the Swedish King Oscar II, who inspected the German warships and conferred decorations on the senior officers. Friedrich der Grosse participated in that year's fleet maneuvers, and on 29 September the ship departed the Baltic for Wilhelmshaven. She was decommissioned there temporarily before being reactivated on 1 October as the active ship of the newly created Reserve Division of the North Sea. In that role, she served as the guard ship in Wilhelmshaven, in company with the aviso SMS Wacht. KzS Oscar Klausa became the ship's captain at that time.

Friedrich der Grosse returned to Kiel on 4 May 1889 to join the Training Squadron for the year; she arrived three days later. In August 1889, Friedrich der Grosse participated in Kaiser Wilhelm II's visit to Great Britain. The ship was assigned to II Division, along with her sister Preusse and the central battery ironclads Kaiser and Deutschland, under command of Konteradmiral Friedrich von Hollmann. The fleet then conducted maneuvers in the North Sea before returning to Germany. The squadron was initially disbanded at the end of August, and Friedrich der Grosse went to Wilhelmshaven to undergo an overhaul. But the work was interrupted when she and the rest of II Division were recalled to become the training squadron for the fleet in 1889–1890, the first year the Kaiserliche Marine maintained a year-round ironclad force. Friedrich der Grosse and Preussen left Wilhelmshaven on 26 September to join the squadron in Plymouth, Britain, arriving there three days later. The squadron escorted Wilhelm II's imperial yacht to the Mediterranean; the voyage included state visits to Italy and the Ottoman Empire. The ships also escorted Wilhelm on a visit to Athens, Greece, for the marriage of his sister Sophie to Prince Constantine. The squadron remained in the Mediterranean until April 1890, when it departed for Germany. The ships stopped in Lisbon, Portugal, on the way back, before arriving in Wilhelmshaven on 22 April.

Friedrich der Grosse returned to the Kaiserliche Werft (Imperial Shipyard) in Wilhelmshaven for the overhaul that had been deferred from the previous year. The work was completed by 8 May, and Friedrich der Grosse immediately departed for Kiel to join the Training Squadron. The unit conducted maneuvers from 9 June to the end of the month before escorting Wilhelm II on a state visit to Christiania, Norway. She participated in the ceremonial transfer of the island of Helgoland from British to German control later in July. She was present during the fleet maneuvers in September, where the entire eight-ship armored squadron simulated a Russian fleet blockading Kiel. II Division, including Friedrich der Grosse. The exercises also included joint operations with army units along the coast of Schleswig. The maneuvers concluded on 11 September, and four days later the ship returned to Wilhelmshaven, where she was decommissioned on 22 September for a more thorough overhaul. Friedrich der Grosse remained out of service until 10 October 1891, when she was recommissioned and assigned to II Division of the Training Squadron. KzS Oscar von Schuckmann took command of the ship for her next two years in service. She took part in training operations in the winter of 1891–1892, which began with exercises in the North Sea before transitioning to the Baltic in January 1892. She took part in a naval review held in Kiel for the visit of Alexander III on 7 June. The 1892 maneuvers lasted from 23 August until 28 September, which included exercises in the North and Baltic Seas. The fleet was commanded by Konteradmiral Hans von Koester for the duration of the maneuvers. Friedrich der Grosse thereafter returned to Wilhelmshaven to resume her old role as guard ship in the Reserve Division there.

After returning to active service in 1893, Friedrich der Grosse embarked on a solo cruise in the Baltic before joining the rest of the fleet later that year. She participated in the 1893 maneuvers, which included a simulation of a French naval attack in the North Sea. In mid-October, she joined II Division, but had to return to Wilhelmshaven on 2 December for periodic maintenance. The following year, Friedrich der Grosse, König Wilhelm, and Deutschland joined the new battleship Brandenburg in the II Division of what had been redesignated as the Maneuver Squadron, under the command of Konteradmiral Otto von Diederichs. In April 1894, II Division conducted a training cruise to prepare for the annual summer maneuvers. While steaming off Frisia, König Wilhelm ran aground and Friedrich der Grosse assisted in pulling her free. The ships then proceeded to Scotland via Oslo and Bergen. The division returned to Kiel at the end of May to replenish its stocks of coal and provisions for the summer exercises. KzS Wilhelm Büchsel then took command of the ship; he was to be her final commander. The ships simulated a Russian attack on Germany's Baltic coast in the 1894 maneuvers.

The navy considered rebuilding the ship into an armored cruiser along similar lines to the Kaiser-class ironclads to relieve Kaiser in East Asian waters, but the plans came to nothing. Friedrich der Grosse was instead decommissioned on 12 October 1894 and assigned to the inactive reserve. She was transferred from the list of warships to the list of special purpose ships on 16 November 1896, and thereafter became a harbor ship. She was struck from the list of active vessels on 21 May 1906 and from late 1906 served as a coal hulk for torpedo boats. Friedrich der Grosse served in this capacity until after the end of World War I; she was removed from the naval register on 27 January 1919. She was sold to shipbreakers and broken up for scrap the following year in Rönnebeck.
