= SMS Grosser Kurfürst (1875) =

Ironclad turret ship of the German Imperial Navy

Coordinates: 51°0′36″N 1°9′39″E

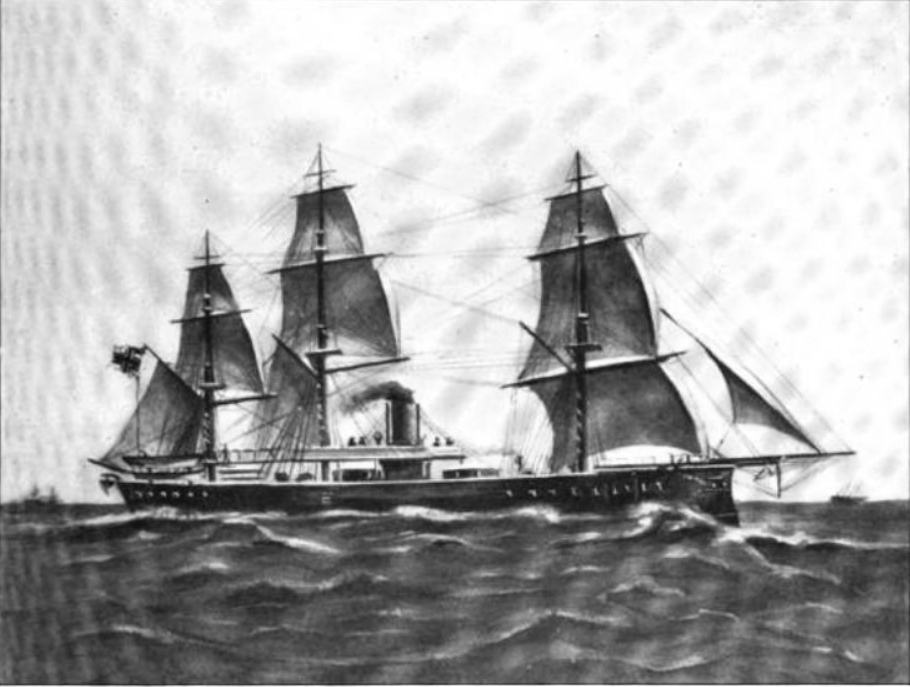
- SMS Grosser Kurfürst underway on her maiden voyage

History
- Name: SMS Grosser Kurfürst
- Builder: Kaiserliche Werft Wilhelmshaven
- Laid down: 1869
- Launched: 17 September 1875
- Commissioned: 6 May 1878
- Fate: Accidentally rammed and sunk by SMS König Wilhelm 31 May 1878

General characteristics
- Class & type: Preussen-class ironclad
- Displacement: Design: 6,821 t (6,713 long tons); Full load: 7,718 t (7,596 long tons)
- Length: 96.59 m (316 ft 11 in)
- Beam: 16.30 m (53 ft 6 in)
- Draft: 7.11 m (23 ft 4 in)
- Installed power: 6 × boilers; 4,998 PS (4,930 ihp)
- Propulsion: 1 × single-expansion steam engine and sail; 1 × screw propeller
- Sail plan: Full-rigged ship
- Speed: 14 knots (26 km/h; 16 mph)
- Range: 1,690 nmi (3,130 km) at 10 kn (19 km/h)
- Complement: 46 officers; 454 enlisted men
- Armament: 4 × 26 cm (10 in) guns; 2 × 17 cm (6.7 in) guns
- Armor: Upper belt: 203 mm (8 in); Lower belt: 102 to 229 mm (4 to 9 in); Turrets: 203 to 254 mm (8 to 10 in)

SMS Grosser Kurfürst (Note: "SMS" stands for "Seiner Majestät Schiff", or "His Majesty's Ship".) (or Großer (Note: This is the German "sharp S"; see ß.)) was an ironclad turret ship built for the German Kaiserliche Marine (Imperial Navy). She was laid down at the Imperial Dockyard in Wilhelmshaven in 1870 and completed in 1878; her long construction time was in part due to a redesign that was completed after work on the ship had begun. Her main battery of four 26 cm (10 in) guns was initially to be placed in a central armored battery, but during the redesign, this was altered to a pair of twin gun turrets amidships.

Grosser Kurfürst was sunk on her maiden voyage when she was accidentally rammed by the ironclad SMS König Wilhelm. The two ships, along with SMS Preussen, were steaming in the English Channel on 31 May 1878. The three ships encountered a group of fishing boats under sail; in turning to avoid them, Grosser Kurfürst inadvertently crossed König Wilhelm's path and was rammed, sinking within about fifteen minutes. Between 269 and 284 of her crew drowned. Her loss spurred a series of investigations into the circumstances of the collision, which ultimately resulted in the acquittal of both Rear Admiral Karl Ferdinand Batsch, the squadron commander, and Count Alexander von Monts, the captain of Grosser Kurfürst. Political infighting over the affair led to the ousting of Rear Admiral Reinhold von Werner from the navy.

== Design ==
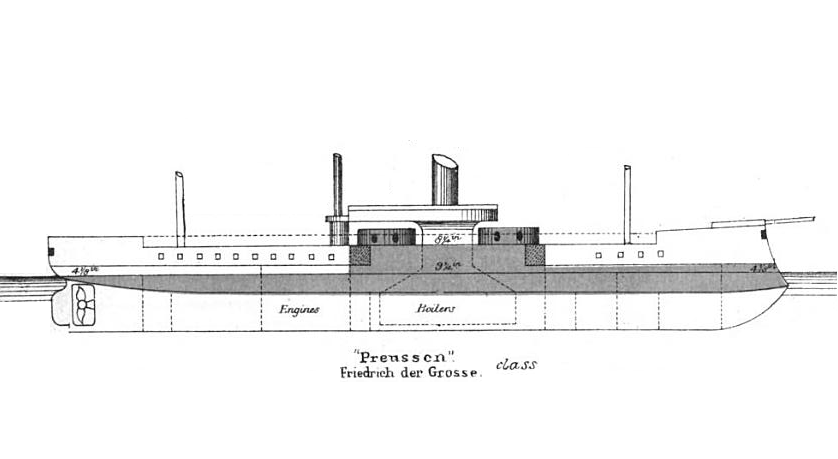
Line-drawing of a Preussen-class ironclad

The three Preussen-class ironclads were authorized under the naval program of 1867, which had been approved by the Reichstag (Imperial Diet) to strengthen the North German Federal Navy in the wake of the Second Schleswig War, when the weak Prussian Navy had been unable to break the blockade imposed by the Danish Navy. Initially ordered as casemate ships, the vessels were re-designed as turret ships; they were the first uniform class of ironclads built for the German fleet.

Grosser Kurfürst was 96.59 meters (316.9 ft) long overall and had a beam of 16.30 m (53.5 ft) and a draft of 7.12 m (23.4 ft) forward. The ship was powered by one 3-cylinder single-expansion steam engine, which drove a single screw propeller. Steam was supplied by six coal-fired transverse trunk boilers, which were vented into a single funnel. The ship's top speed was 14 knots (26 km/h; 16 mph), at 5,468 metric horsepower (5,393 ihp). She was also equipped with a full ship rig of sails. Her standard complement was 46 officers and 454 enlisted men.

She was armed with a main battery of four 26 cm (10 in) L/22 guns mounted in a pair of turrets placed on the centerline amidships. (Note: "L/22" denotes the length of the gun in terms of caliber. A 22 caliber gun is 22 times as long as it is wide in diameter, so a 26 cm L/22 gun is 572 cm (225 in) long.) As built, the ship was also equipped with two 17 cm (6.7 in) RK L/25 guns as chase guns, one in the bow and one in the stern. Grosser Kurfürst's armor was made of wrought iron backed with teak. The armored belt was arrayed in two strakes. The upper strake was 203 mm (8 in) thick; the lower strake ranged in thickness from 102 to 229 mm (4 to 9 in). Both were backed with 234 to 260 mm (9.2 to 10.2 in) of teak. The gun turrets were protected by 203 to 254 mm (8 to 10 in) armor on the sides, backed by 260 mm of teak.

== Service history ==
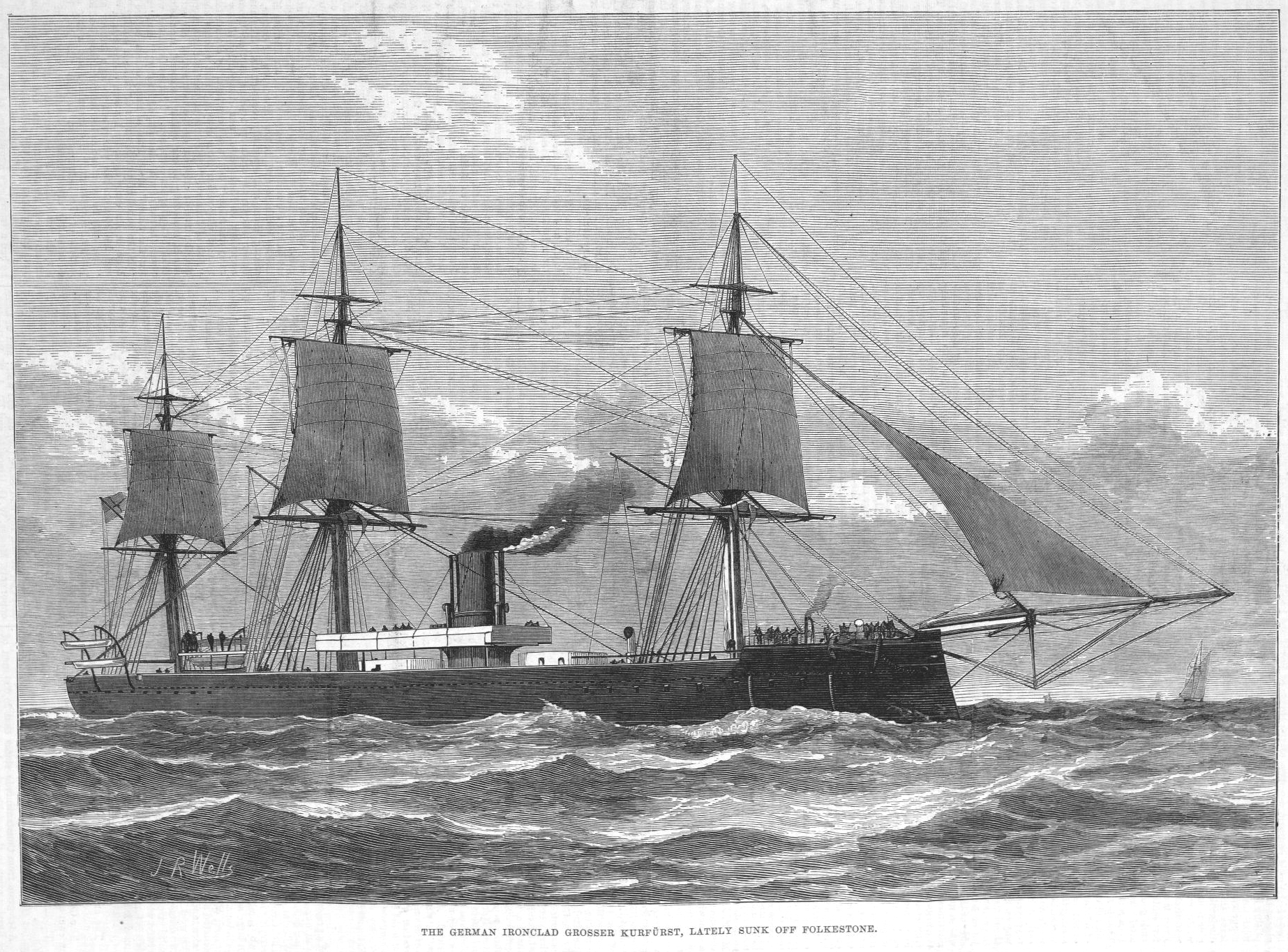
Grosser Kurfürst underway

Grosser Kurfürst ("Great Elector") was ordered by the Imperial Navy from the Kaiserliche Werft (Imperial Dockyard) in Wilhelmshaven; the date of her keel laying is unclear. According to the historian Erich Gröner, work on the ship began in 1869 under construction number 2, but the historians Hans Hildebrand, Albert Röhr, and Hans-Otto Steinmetz state that construction work on the newly built Kaiserliche Werft was not completed until December 1869, and that it was not clear whether any work on the ship had begun before the start of the Franco-Prussian War in July 1870 beyond collecting building materials. Furthermore, they state that the specific date has not survived in the available records. The ship's name was originally to have been Der Grosse Kurfürst, but it was changed slightly to Grosser Kurfürst during construction.

The ship was launched on 17 September 1875; at the launching ceremony, the Chief of the Imperial Admiralty, General Albrecht von Stosch, christened the ship on behalf of Peter II, Grand Duke of Oldenburg, who had been invited for the ceremony but was ill. Work on the ship was largely completed by December 1877, permitting the beginning of sea trials. She was formally commissioned of 6 May 1878, though she still had shipyard workers aboard. The ship was placed under the command of Kapitän zur See (Captain at Sea) Alexander von Monts. The lengthy construction period was the result of several factors: the delay caused by the Franco-Prussian War, the inexperience of the new imperial shipyard, and the re-design of the ship after work had begun.

=== Collision and loss ===
In April 1878, the armored squadron was reactivated for the annual summer training cycle, under the command of Konteradmiral Carl Ferdinand Batsch. Stosch ordered Grosser Kurfürst to join the unit, which included her sisters Preussen and Friedrich der Grosse, the large ironclad König Wilhelm, and the aviso Falke after her commissioning on 6 May. She was to join the rest of the unit at 27 May, just three weeks after her crew came aboard the ship and before they were sufficiently familiar with the vessel. Batsch recognized that the crew was not ready for major operation, but he instructed Grosser Kurfürst to join him anyway to comply with Stosch's orders. A grounding by Friedrich der Grosse caused serious damage to her hull and prevented her from taking part in the upcoming training cruise. The three ships left Wilhelmshaven on the 29th, bound for the Mediterranean Sea.

Shortly after leaving Germany, the squadron parted ways temporarily with Falke due to engine problems aboard the aviso. While crossing the North Sea, Grosser Kurfürst briefly had her rudder stuck, but her crew were able to free it while underway. The ship also had trouble keeping station with the other ironclads, in part due to poor quality coal, but also the inexperience of her boiler room personnel, who had trouble keeping pressure up in the boilers. The ships initially traveled in two columns, the left one led by König Wilhelm, which was followed by Preussen. Grosser Kurfürst steamed to their right by herself. At 02:55 on 31 May, the German ships entered the English Channel and temporarily shifted to a single file formation. The ships soon resumed their original formation, with Grosser Kurfürst steaming 400 m (1,300 ft) from the other ships. At 07:40, the ships passed the east light ship at Goodwin Sands, and fifty minutes later, entered the Strait of Dover.

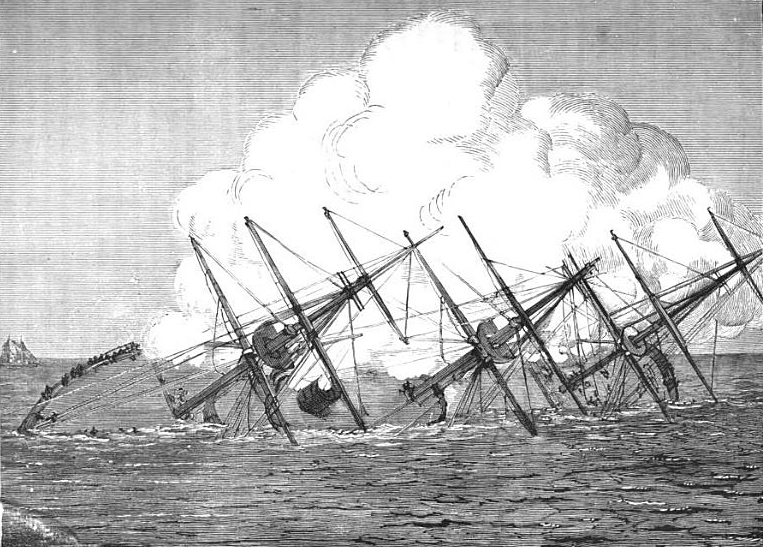
SMS Grosser Kurfürst sinking on her maiden voyage

Five minutes after entering the Dover strait, Batsch ordered Grosser Kurfürst to close to within 100 m (330 ft) as the waterway narrowed. Monts took direct command of the helm to comply with Batsch's command. At 09:00, the ships passed the narrowest point in the straits; they steamed at a speed of 9 knots (17 km/h; 10 mph). Shortly thereafter, while passing Folkestone, the ships encountered a barque and a brig sailing on a southeast course, some 600 m (2,000 ft) from the German vessels. In accordance with maritime regulations, König Wilhelm and Preussen turned to starboard to avoid a collision with the merchant vessels. Grosser Kurfürst conformed with the maneuver, but she and König Wilhelm accidentally closed with each other. Monts ordered his ship's engines to full power and turned hard to starboard in an attempt to avoid the flagship, while Batsch ordered König Wilhelm hard to port, but neither vessel was able to turn in time. König Wilhelm found herself pointed directly at Grosser Kurfürst; her ram bow tore a large hole in Grosser Kurfürst's side. The collision was so severe that Grosser Kurfürst was pushed back to port and part of her mizzenmast was torn off, among other damage to the upper works of the ship. Most of the ship's boats on the port side were also destroyed.

König Wilhelm disentangled from Grosser Kurfürst and slowly returned to her original course, and the latter attempted to follow the flagship on the port side. Flooding aboard König Wilhelm was quickly brought under control, but the crew aboard Grosser Kurfürst was unable to do so. This was in part due to the fact that the damage hole in her hull was at the location of one of her transverse watertight bulkheads. Worse, Grosser Kurfürst's remaining watertight bulkheads were not adequately sealed, which also contributed to her rapid sinking. As the ship took on more water and the list increased, water began to enter through open portholes as well. Monts had attempted to steer the fatally damaged ship into shallower water, but was unable to cross the approximate 1.5 nautical miles (2.8 km; 1.7 mi) before she capsized and sank. Shortly before sinking, about fifteen minutes after the collision, Monts ordered the crew to abandon ship.

König Wilhelm slowly approached and lowered all of her boats to pick up the men in the water, while Preussen stopped some 800 m (2,600 ft) away, her captain having decided to strictly follow regulations. Nearby British fishing boats and other vessels also joined the rescue effort. They picked up some sixty men. Monts was picked up by one of König Wilhelm's boats, but it capsized due to overcrowding; he thereafter helped another man stay afloat until they were picked up by another boat. Figures for the number of fatalities vary. Gröner reports that out of a crew of 500 men, 269 died in the accident; Hildebrand, Röhr, and Steinmetz concur with the fatality total, but state that there were only 487 men aboard the ship at the time of the sinking. Lawrence Sondhaus states that 276 men were killed, and Aidan Dodson reports 284 fatalities. Many of the bodies were ultimately buried in Cheriton Road Cemetery, Folkestone, where there is a substantial memorial. Arthur Sullivan, on his way to Paris, witnessed the incident, writing, "I saw it all – saw the unfortunate vessel slowly go over and disappear under the water in clear, bright sunshine, and the water like a calm lake. It was too horrible – and then we saw all the boats moving about picking up the survivors, some so exhausted they had to be lifted on to the ships."

König Wilhelm was badly damaged in the collision, with severe flooding forward. König Wilhelm's captain initially intended to beach the ship to prevent it from sinking, but determined that the ship's pumps could hold the flooding to an acceptable level. The ship made for Portsmouth, where temporary repairs could be effected to allow the ship to return to Germany. The survivors were carried home to Germany aboard the two ironclads and Falke, which had repaired her engines and arrived in Folkestone by that time. In the aftermath of the collision, the German navy held a court martial for Batsch, the squadron commander, and Captains Monts and Kuehne, the commanders of the two ships, along with Lieutenant Clausa, the first officer aboard Grosser Kurfürst, to investigate the sinking.

=== Inquiry ===
Diagram of the maneuvers of the German flotilla

In the ensuing inquiry, chaired by Konteradmiral Reinhold von Werner, Monts testified that he had not been given sufficient time to familiarize himself with the ship and its crew, who were themselves unfamiliar with the vessel. Monts argued that the mobilization process for the newly commissioned ship should have lasted four to six weeks, rather than the three he had been given. The day before the squadron left Wilhelmshaven, Batsch complained to Stosch that a significant number of dockyard workers were still finishing work on Grosser Kurfürst. Werner and the board determined that Batsch was at fault and exonerated Monts. Their report was issued on 22 July. Stosch had attempted to interfere in the investigation by blaming Monts to protect Batsch, who was his protege and his preferred successor. Stosch's attempts to manipulate the court martial prompted Kaiser Wilhelm I to issue a reprimand for his conduct.

Stosch was infuriated that the proceedings had been allowed to become a forum for criticism of his policies, for which he blamed Werner. He appealed to Kaiser Wilhelm, stating that the inquiry had unfairly blamed Batsch, and requested a new court-martial for the involved officers. Simultaneously, Stosch began a campaign to force Werner out of the navy. This was in part to ensure that Batsch would be next in line after Stosch retired. Despite his popularity, particularly with Kaiser Wilhelm I and his son, Werner was unable to resist Stosch's efforts to force his ouster. On 15 October 1878, he requested retirement.

The second court-martial again found Batsch guilty and Monts innocent of negligence. A third investigation, held in January 1879, reversed the decision of the previous verdicts and convicted Monts and the watch officer aboard König Wilhelm of negligence, and imposing a prison term of one month and two days for Monts, though the Kaiser refused to implement the punishment. This necessitated another trial, held in early June, which returned to the initial verdict and sentenced Batsch to six months in prison. The Kaiser commuted Batsch's sentence after he had served two months in the fortress at Magdeburg. Disappointed that his protégé had taken the blame for the sinking, Stosch requested another court-martial for Monts, who was found not guilty. The Kaiser officially approved the verdict, which put an end to the series of trials over the sinking of Grosser Kurfürst. Batsch submitted his resignation over the incident, but Wilhelm refused to accept it. Instead, he was promoted to vizeadmiral (vice admiral) on 3 February 1880.

=== Aftermath ===
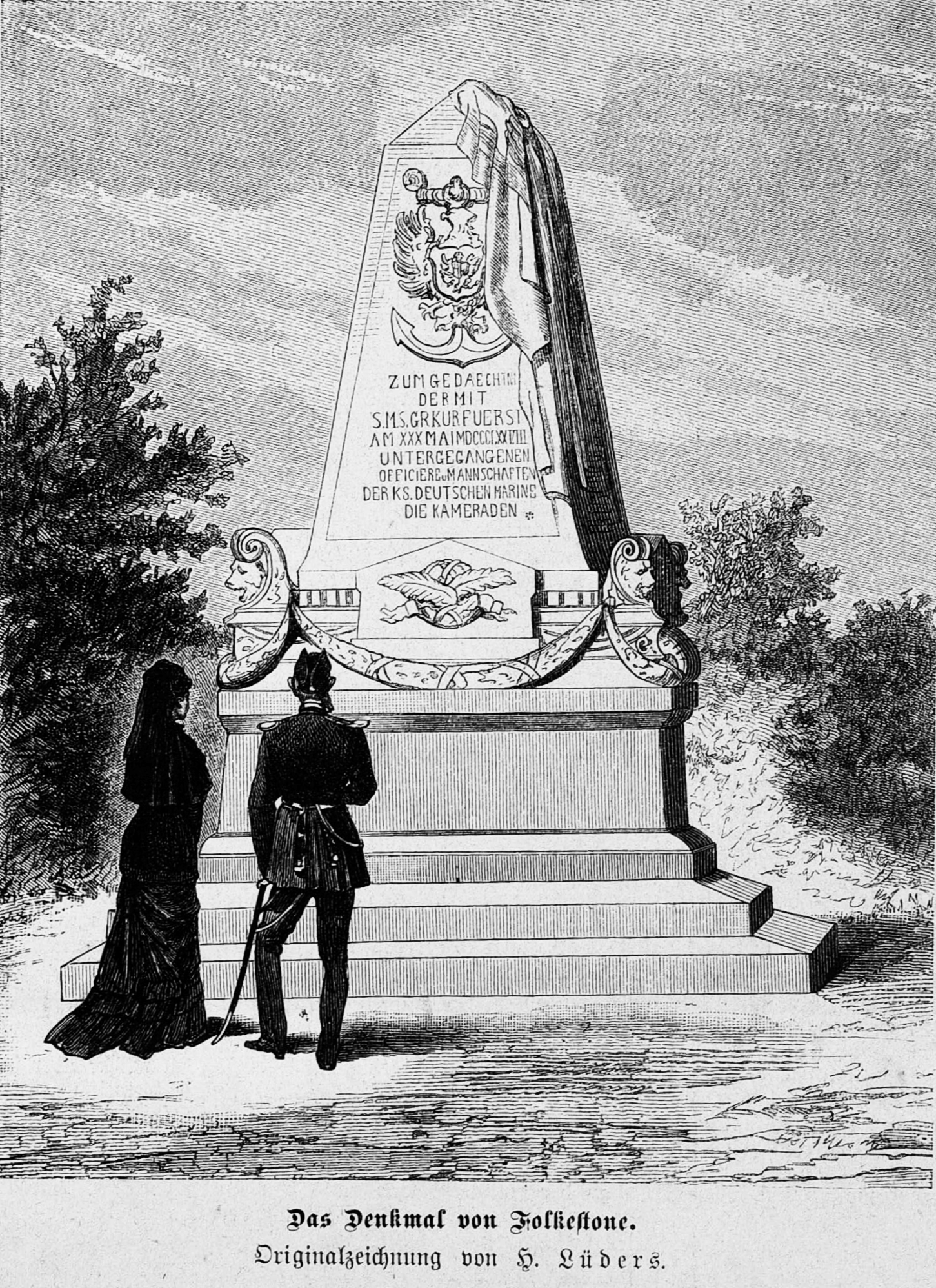
Illustration of the memorial in Folkestone

The incident provided clear evidence to senior naval leadership that new crews required significantly more time to familiarize themselves with a new ship before they could be pronounced ready for active service. The method for issuing commands to the rudder crews was also changed. Stosch's position both in the naval command structure and politically was weakened. Many navy officers ultimately blamed him for the accident, for having rushed the ship into service. They pointed to his career in the army, frequently citing the argument that "one cannot make a ship ready for service in a few days like a regiment or a brigade." Stosch was known to have been an ally of the liberal-left party of the Reichstag, but his relationship with the party was damaged when the reports on the incident, which he had promised to deliver to parliament, were labeled military secrets.

Another consequence of the sinking was to instill an aversion to naval expenditures in the German Reichstag that persisted for many years. Among the effects of this reluctance to spend on the navy was the refusal to authorize funding for new capital ships for most of the 1880s. In addition, the design for the ironclad Oldenburg, which was to have been a member of the Sachsen class, had to be reduced significantly as a result of the shortage of funds.

The lives lost in the sinking of the Grosser Kurfürst are commemorated by a large stone obelisk erected at the Cheriton Road Cemetery in Folkestone, which was erected on 12 January 1881. The sail training ship Niobe had brought it from Germany. Another monument was placed in front of the barracks of I. Seebataillon to memorialize the naval infantry who had died in the sinking.

An initial survey of the wreck by divers in the immediate aftermath of the sinking revealed the hull to be upside down and in good condition apart from the hole torn by König Wilhelm's ram. British authorities doubted the possibility of raising the ship, but the Germans nevertheless sent a team aboard a steamer Boreas and the aviso Loreley to make an initial attempt, which was not successful. A private salvage company offered to raise the wreck to recover her guns and other equipment, but it, too, came to nothing. Engineers at the Kaiserliche Werft in Kiel experimented using compressed carbon dioxide, but their tests did not work. The Germans considered additional projects to salvage the wreck as late as 1903.

In 2020, it was announced by Historic England that the memorial would be listed as a Grade II listed building, and the wreck itself would be scheduled under the Ancient Monuments and Archaeological Areas Act 1979, allowing recreational diving under license but prohibiting salvage or removal of artifacts.
