= Borussia =

Borussia is the Latin name for Prussia. It may refer to:

Sports clubs

Unless stated, each club (multi-sport or not) plays association football

- Tennis Borussia Berlin
- Borussia Bocholt
- Borussia Dortmund, multi-sport
- Borussia Düsseldorf, table tennis only
- HSV Borussia Friedenstal, multi-sport
- Borussia Fulda, multi-sport
- Borussia 06 Hildesheim (1946–2003)
- Borussia Mönchengladbach, multi-sport
- Borussia Neunkirchen
- Borussia-Preußen Stettin (1937–1945) multi-sport
- Wuppertaler SV, formerly Wuppertaler SV Borussia (2004–2013) multi-sport

Other uses

- Borussia-Park, the stadium of Borussia Mönchengladbach
- SS Borussia, a number of steamships including:
- Corps Borussia Bonn, Bonn student corps
- Corps Saxo-Borussia Heidelberg, Heidelberg student corps
- Borussia (anthem), patriotic song from Prussia
