= Alexander von Monts =

German admiral (1832–1889)

- Alexander Graf von Monts
- Born: 9 August 1832; Berlin, Prussia
- Died: 19 January 1889 (aged 56); Berlin
- Military career
- Allegiance: German Empire
- Branch: Prussian Navy; North German Federal Navy; Imperial German Navy
- Service years: 1849–1889
- Rank: Vizeadmiral
- Commands: SMS Loreley; SMS Grosser Kurfürst; SMS Vineta; North Sea Naval Station
- Conflicts: Second Schleswig War; *Battle of Jasmund; Austro-Prussian War; Franco-Prussian War

Alexander Graf von Monts de Mazin (born 9 August 1832 in Berlin; died 19 January 1889) was an officer in the Prussian Navy and later the German Imperial Navy. He saw action during the Second Schleswig War at the Battle of Jasmund on 17 March 1864 as the commander of the paddle steamer SMS Loreley. He served in a variety of roles through the 1860s and 1870s, including as the commander of the ironclad SMS Grosser Kurfürst, which sank after being rammed accidentally by the ironclad König Wilhelm on the former's maiden voyage in May 1875. Monts was ultimately cleared of wrongdoing in four courts-martial held by the chief of the German Imperial Admiralty, Albrecht von Stosch in an attempt to drive him from the navy. In 1883, Stosch was replaced by Leo von Caprivi, who appointed Monts the chief of the North Sea Naval Station. In 1888, he became the third chief of the Admiralty after Caprivi retired, though Monts remained in the position for just six months before he died.

== Early career ==
Monts was born on 9 August 1832 in Berlin, the son of Karl von Monts and his wife Karoline Luise Wilhelmine Antoinette von Byern. His father was a lieutenant general in the Prussian Army. Monts joined the Prussian Navy on 29 November 1849, being a number of "firsts" for the Prussian fleet. He was the first officer to have entered from a Gymnasium rather than from the merchant marine; he was the first Graf (Count) to enter the navy, and he was the first son of a general of the Prussian Army to opt for naval service. Monts began his basic training at the Marineschule (naval school) in Stettin on entering service, which lasted until 12 May 1850. The next day, he was assigned to the corvette SMS Amazone, where he served until 30 September. He then transferred to the training ship Mercur on 1 October. Monts left the ship on 2 November 1851, returning to the Marineschule for another period of instruction from 3 November 1851 to 10 May 1852. The following day he was assigned to the sailing frigate Gefion, and he remained aboard until 29 April 1854. He was promoted to what was then the rank of Leutnant zur See II Klasse (second lieutenant, second class) on 27 November 1856. Monts thereafter spent nearly two years aboard vessels of the British Royal Navy. Between 30 April 1854 and 19 January 1856, he served aboard the screw ship of the line HMS St George, the fourth-rate Indefatigable, the fifth-rate Active, and the iron gunvessel Sharpshooter.

After returning to Germany, he served several periods as watch officer aboard Mercur, Gefion, and the frigate Arcona, alternating between sea assignments and postings in Berlin at the sea cadet institute for various training courses. From 29 July to 22 October 1859, he served at the Königliche Werft (Royal Shipyard) in Danzig, after which he returned to Arcona for another assignment as watch officer and adjutant. Beginning on 16 January 1860, he also served as the flag lieutenant for the squadron. He remained aboard Arcona until 10 August 1862. Over the course of 1863, he served as the first officer and then commander aboard the yacht Grille and the commander of the gunboat Delphin. From 25 November 1863 to 14 January 1864, he served as the watch officer aboard the corvette Nymphe.

== Wars of German unification ==
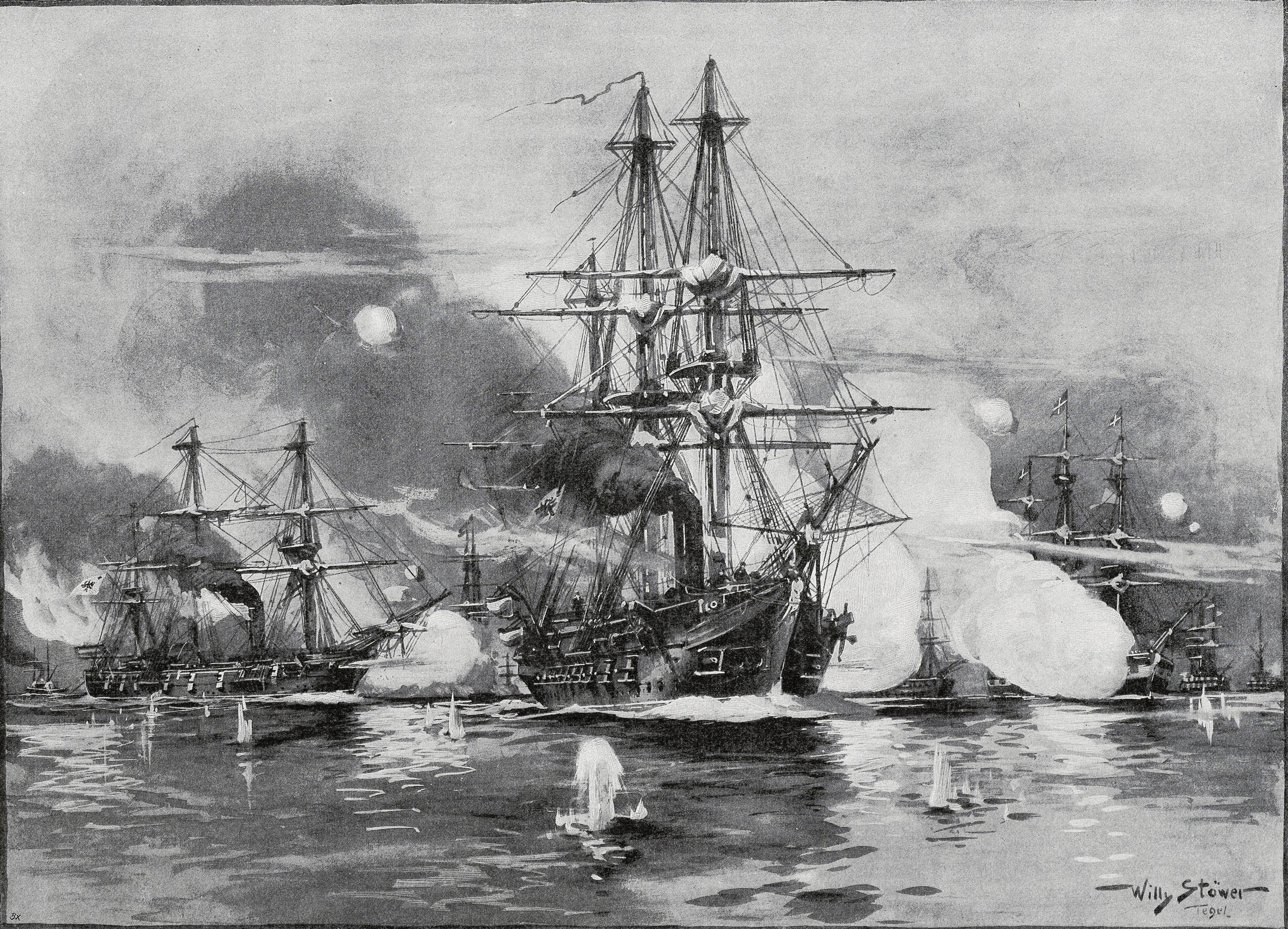
Painting of the battle, depicting the Prussian squadron, by Willy Stöwer

On 12 March 1864, Monts was promoted to the rank of Leutnant zur See I Klasse, which on 20 May was renamed as Kapitänleutnant. During the Second Schleswig War in 1864 he commanded the armed paddle steamer Loreley. He took part in the Battle of Jasmund on 17 March under the command of Eduard von Jachmann. After the war, he was posted for three years to the German Imperial Naval High Command in Berlin. There, he served as an adjutant and as a member of the commission for torpedo construction. The short Austro-Prussian War of the summer of 1866 took place during this period; since Monts did not have a posting at sea, he saw no action. He served aboard Niobe from 1 August 1867 to 27 May 1868. In November 1867, the Prussian Navy became the North German Federal Navy. On 20 February 1868 Monts was promoted to Korvettenkapitän (lieutenant commander) as part of the section for naval and coastal artillery. Monts became the commander of the Torpedo Command at Wilhelmshaven on 16 July 1870, three days before the outbreak of the Franco-Prussian War. The French Navy attempted to blockade Wilhelmshaven in the early months of the war, but the French ironclads lacked the coal capacity to remain on station long enough to maintain the blockade, and they did not attack the port directly; as a result, Monts saw no action during the war.

After the war, Monts became the commander of the I Torpedo Detachment, and concurrently served as the Inspector of Torpedo Systems. This role was created by the chief of the admiralty, Albrecht von Stosch, and was tasked with evaluating the effectiveness of the new Whitehead torpedoes; Stosch placed Monts in charge of the tests. He later commanded the artillery school ship Renown from 16 April 1873 to 31 August 1875, interrupted by a stint with the Artillery Testing Commission in late 1873 and early 1874. During this period, on 2 May 1874, he was promoted to the rank of Kapitän zur See. From 1 September 1875 to 17 November 1877, he commanded the frigate Vineta; during this period the ship went on an extended cruise around the world. While in East Asian waters, Monts was the senior-most officer of the German ship captains in the region, and thus he served as the overall commander.

== Grosser Kurfürst sinking ==
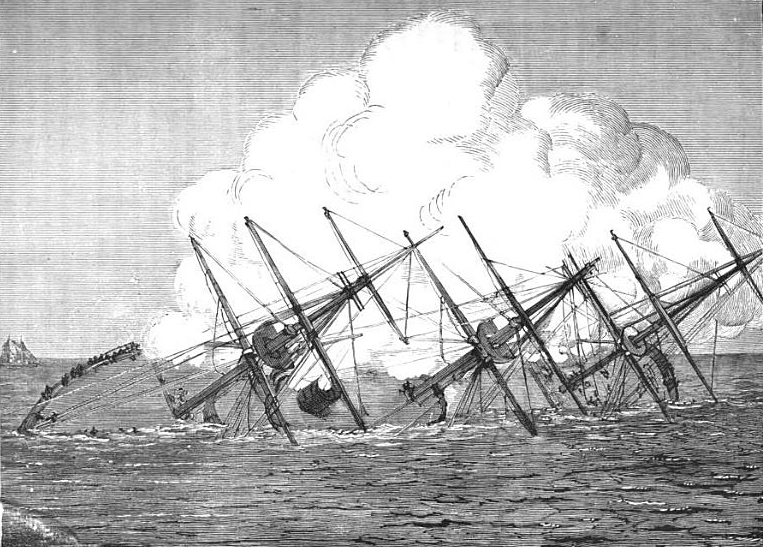
SMS Grosser Kurfürst sinking on 31 May 1878, with Monts aboard

The following year, he captained the newly commissioned ironclad SMS Grosser Kurfürst during the ship's accidental ramming and sinking by the ironclad König Wilhelm on 31 May 1878. The two ships (along with the ironclad Preussen) had been steaming off the coast of Great Britain, under the command of Carl Ferdinand Batsch, when they encountered a pair of sailing vessels. König Wilhelm turned to port too slowly and accidentally rammed Grosser Kurfürst, tearing a large hole in her hull below the waterline. The ship's inexperienced crew had left the watertight doors open, which led her to sink quickly. Monts himself was pulled from the water, but half of the ship's crew were killed in the sinking.

In the aftermath of the sinking, rivalries between Stosch and his opponents led Stosch to pursue four courts-martial to drive Monts from the navy in an effort to save Batsch, his own protege. Stosch also sought to suppress criticism Monts had leveled against Stosch's administration during the initial investigation. Stosch, an army officer, was infuriated that the proceedings had been allowed to become a forum for criticism of his policies, for which he blamed Konteradmiral (Rear Admiral) Reinhold von Werner, the chairman of the investigation. He appealed to Kaiser Wilhelm I, stating that the inquiry had unfairly blamed Admiral Batsch, and requested a new court martial for the officers involved in the incident. Simultaneously, Stosch began a campaign to force Werner out of the navy. This was in part to ensure that Batsch, his protégé, would be next in line after Stosch retired. The second court martial again found Batsch guilty and Monts innocent of negligence.

A third investigation, held in January 1879, reversed the decision of the previous verdicts and sentenced Monts to a prison term of one month and two days, though the Kaiser refused to implement the punishment. This necessitated another trial, which returned to the initial verdict and sentenced Batsch to six months in prison. The Kaiser commuted Batsch's sentence after he had served two months' time. Disappointed that his protégé had taken the blame for the sinking, Stosch requested another court martial for Monts, who was found not guilty. The Kaiser officially approved the verdict, which put an end to the series of trials over the sinking of Grosser Kurfürst. The situation became complicated for Stosch when Batsch agreed with Mont's critiques on the lack of emphasis Stosch had made on training. Wilhelm I refused to allow Stosch to fire Monts, in part because he had been acquitted by the courts-martial.

== Later career and Admiralty chief ==
On 12 April 1881 Monts was promoted to Konteradmiral. He became the chief of North Sea Naval Station on 23 July 1883. This appointment came after Leo von Caprivi replaced Stosch, which in turn led to Batsch retiring in protest for not having been named Stosch's replacement. Monts remained the chief of the North Sea Naval Station for five years. In January 1884, Caprivi, another army officer, formed an Admiralty Council that included Monts to advise him. Among the topics discussed was the direction the navy should adopt in terms of future construction; Monts and the other admirals advocated a continuation of the ironclad program begun under Stosch, but Caprivi preferred—and enacted—a program centered on coastal defense ships and torpedo boats. From 22 April to 15 September that year, Monts also held the role of commander of the training squadron. This included commanding the annual fleet training exercises from his flagship, the ironclad Baden. During the exercises, Caprivi instructed Monts to abandon the useless parade exercises of the Stosch era in favor of more practical training like night torpedo attacks. On 12 September, he was promoted to the rank of Vizeadmiral (Vice Admiral).

In late 1887, he again commanded the annual fleet maneuvers. In 1888, Kaiser William II appointed him head of the admiralty. Monts was the first naval officer to command the navy, and he was the last chief of the admiralty. In his new role, he did not correct the strategic confusion that marked the Caprivi era, where the German fleet acquired a mix of obsolescent ironclads, fully rigged corvettes, and ineffectual armored gunboats. Monts continued construction of the small Siegfried and Odin classes, but also included four large, ocean-going pre-dreadnought battleships of the Brandenburg class. The construction program also included a host of smaller vessels.

He died on 19 January 1889 in Berlin, after only six months in office. He did not live to see the passage of his construction program, and with his death, Wilhelm II abolished the Chief of the Admiralty position, dividing its responsibilities among three new offices. Monts was replaced by Baron Max von der Goltz in the Imperial Naval High Command and Karl Eduard Heusner became the State Secretary of the Reichsmarineamt (Imperial Naval Office). Monts was survived by his wife, Klara, who later died on 18 May 1902.
