= SS Borussia =

A number of steamships have carried the name Borussia.

- SS Borussia (1855 Prussia), first screw steamer built in Prussia, sank in 1874
- SS Borussia (1855 Scotland), built in Greenock for HAPAG, sank in 1879
- SS Borussia (1905), sank in 1907
- SS Borussia (1912), in service to 1939 (renamed 1945, and later scrapped)
