= Prussian blue (disambiguation) =

Prussian blue or Prussian Blue may refer to:

== Pigments ==
- Prussian blue, a dark blue pigment containing iron and cyanide
  - Prussian blue (medical use), the use of Prussian blue for medical treatment and diagnosis
  - Perls' Prussian blue, a stain used for medical diagnosis

== Music ==
- Prussian Blue (album), a 1973 album by Richard Clapton
- Prussian Blue (duo), a neo-Nazi white nationalist teen pop duo from California
- ""Prussian Blue", a song on Marianne Faithfull's 2011 album Horses and High Heels

== Fiction ==
- Prussian Blue (novel), a 1947 detective novel by Anne Hocking

== See also ==
- Dreams in Prussian Blue, a 2010 novel by Paritosh Uttam, adapted into the film Artist
- Russian Blue, a cat breed
