= SS Borussia (1912) =

1912 coaster by Nüscke & Co, Stettin

History
- Name: Borussia (1912–39); Timandra (1939–45); Empire Confal (1945–47); Woodwren (1947–53); Artemis (1950–53)
- Owner: A Kirsten (1912- ); Kölner Reederei AG (-1932); Rhein-London Linie GmbH (1932–45); Ministry of War Transport (1945); Ministry of Transport (1945–47); General Steam Navigation Co Ltd (1947–50)
- Operator: A Kirsten (1912- ); Edmund Halm & Co (-1932); Rhein-London Linie GmbH (1932–45); Ministry of War Transport (1945); Ministry of Transport (1945–47); General Steam Navigation Co Ltd (1947–50)
- Port of registry: (German Empire) Cologne (1912–19); (Weimar Republic) Cologne (1919–33); (Nazi Germany) Cologne (1933–45); (United Kingdom) London (1945–60)
- Builder: Nüscke & Co,
- Launched: 1912
- Identification: Code Letters HWCP (1912–34); Code Letters DGWC (1934–45)
- Fate: Scrapped

General characteristics
- Type: Coaster
- Tonnage: 948 GRT; 528 NRT
- Length: 219 ft 8 in (66.95 m)
- Beam: 33 ft 5 in (10.19 m)
- Depth: 13 ft 1 in (3.99 m)
- Installed power: Triple expansion steam engine
- Propulsion: Screw propeller

Borussia was a 948 GRT coaster that was built in 1912 by Nüscke & Co, Stettin for German owners. She was renamed Timandra in 1939. She was seized by the Allies at Rendsburg in May 1945, passed to the Ministry of War Transport (MoWT) and renamed Empire Confal. In 1947, she was sold into merchant service and renamed Woodwren. She was renamed Artemis in 1953 and hulked. The hulk was scrapped in 1960.

== Description ==
The ship was built in 1912 by Nüscke & Co, Stettin.

The ship was 219 feet 8 inches (66.95 m) long, with a beam of 33 feet 5 inches (10.19 m) a depth of 13 feet 4 inches (4.06 m). She had a GRT of 948 and a NRT of 528.

The ship was propelled by a six-cylinder triple expansion steam engine, which had two cylinders each of 11 4/5 inches (30 cm), 18 9/16 inches (47.1 cm) and 30 7/16 inches (77.3 cm) diameter by 18 7/16 inches (46.8 cm) stroke. The engine was built by Atlas Werke AG, Bremen.

== History ==
Borussia was built for A Kirsten, Hamburg. Her port of registry was Cologne and the Code Letters HWCP were allocated. By 1930, she had been sold to Kölner Reederei AG and was being operated under the management of Edmund Halm & Co. In 1932, she was sold to Rhein-London Linie GmbH. In 1934, her Code Letters were changed to DGWc. In 1939, Borussia was renamed Artemis. This change was not recorded by Lloyds Register, she continued to be listed as Borussia.

In May 1945, Titania was seized by the Allies at Rendsburg. She was passed to the MoWT and renamed Empire Confal. In 1947, she was sold to the General Steam Navigation Co Ltd and renamed Woodwren. In 1953, she was renamed Artemis and converted to a coal hulk, stationed at Gravesend, Kent. She was scrapped in 1960 at Queenborough, Kent.
