= Preußisch =

Preußisch is the German language adjective for "Prussian".

Preußisch may refer to:

Places in Germany

- Preußisch Oldendorf, town in North Rhine-Westphalia

Places outside of Germany

- Preußisch Eylau, now Bagrationovsk, Russia
- Preußisch Friedland, now Debrzno, Poland
- Preußisch Holland, now Pasłęk, Poland
- Preußisch Stargard, now Starogard Gdański, Poland

Other things

- Neue Preußische Zeitung, German newspaper
- Preußisches Herrenhaus, Prussian House of Lords
- Preußische Treuhand, German expellee company
