= SMS Preussen (1873) =

Ironclad turret ship of the German Imperial Navy

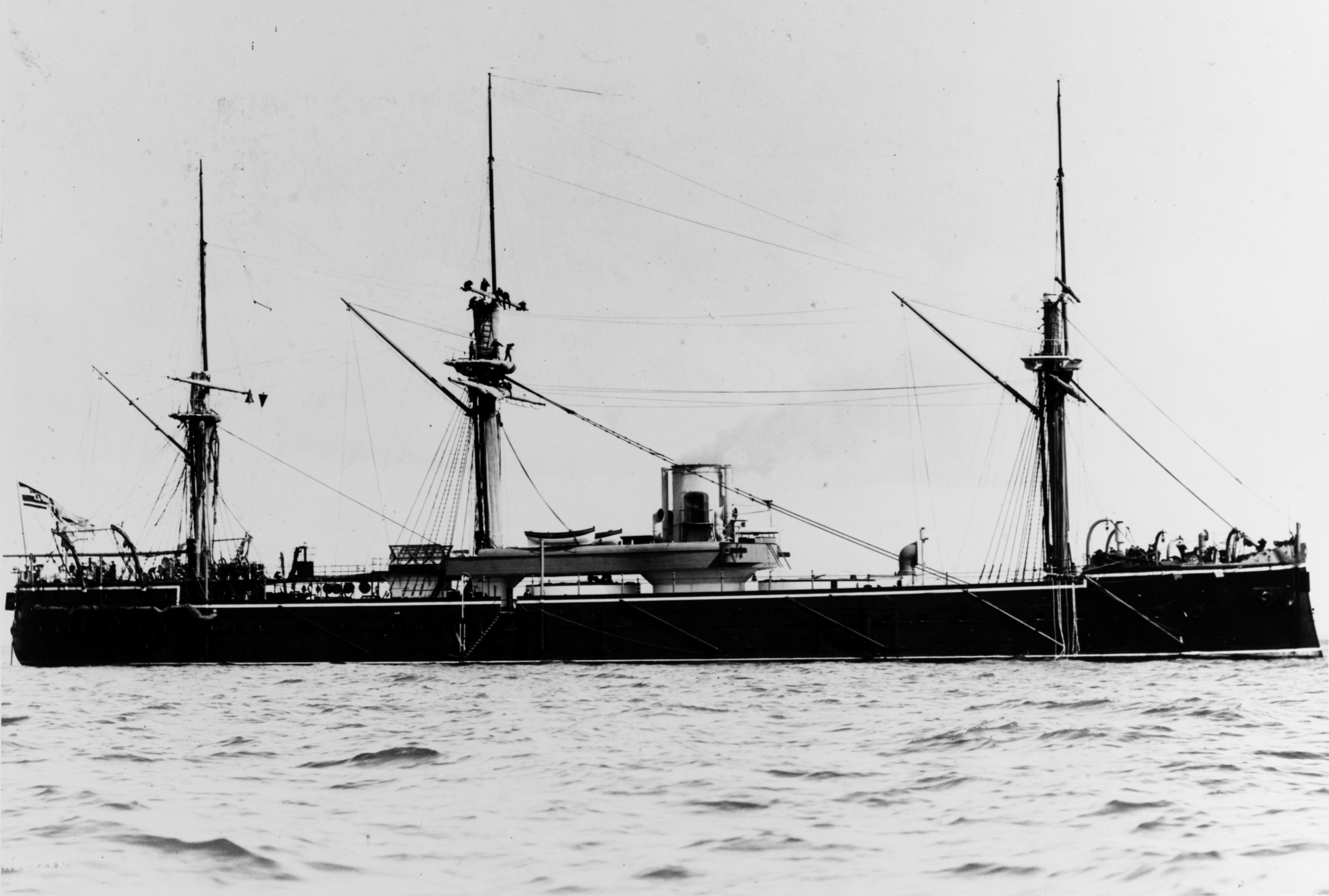
- Preussen in 1887

History
- Name: SMS Preussen
- Namesake: Prussia
- Builder: AG Vulcan, Stettin
- Laid down: 1871
- Launched: 22 November 1873
- Commissioned: 4 July 1876
- Decommissioned: 9 October 1891
- Fate: Scrapped 1919

General characteristics
- Class & type: Preussen-class ironclad
- Displacement: Design: 6,821 t (6,713 long tons); Full load: 7,718 t (7,596 long tons)
- Length: 96.59 m (316 ft 11 in)
- Beam: 16.30 m (53 ft 6 in)
- Draft: 7.11 m (23 ft 4 in)
- Installed power: 6 × boilers; 5,471 PS (5,396 ihp)
- Propulsion: 1 × Single-expansion steam engine; 1 × screw propeller
- Sail plan: Full-rigged ship
- Speed: 14 knots (26 km/h; 16 mph)
- Range: 1,690 nmi (3,130 km) at 10 kn (19 km/h)
- Complement: 46 officers; 454 enlisted men
- Armament: 4 × 26 cm (10 in) guns; 2 × 17 cm (6.7 in) guns
- Armor: Upper belt: 203 mm (8 in); Lower belt: 102 to 229 mm (4 to 9 in); Turrets: 203 to 254 mm (8 to 10 in)

SMS Preussen (Note: "SMS" stands for "Seiner Majestät Schiff", or "His Majesty's Ship".) was an ironclad turret ship built for the German Kaiserliche Marine (Imperial Navy). The ship was built by the AG Vulcan shipyard in Stettin in 1871–1876; she was commissioned into the fleet in July 1876. She was the first large warship of the German navy built by a private shipyard; all previous vessels had been ordered abroad or built by Royal or Imperial dockyards. Her main battery of four 26 cm (10.2 in) guns was mounted in a pair of twin gun turrets amidships.

Preussen served with the fleet from her commissioning until 1891, though she was frequently placed in reserve throughout her career. She cruised the Mediterranean Sea several times during her service, including during a mission in 1877 after unrest in the Ottoman Empire threatened German citizens living there. The ship was withdrawn from service at the end of 1891 and used as a harbor guard ship until 1896, when she was relegated to being a supply ship in Wilhelmshaven. She ended her career as a coal hulk for torpedo boats. In 1903, she was renamed Saturn so her name could be reused. The ship was ultimately sold to shipbreakers in 1919.

== Design ==
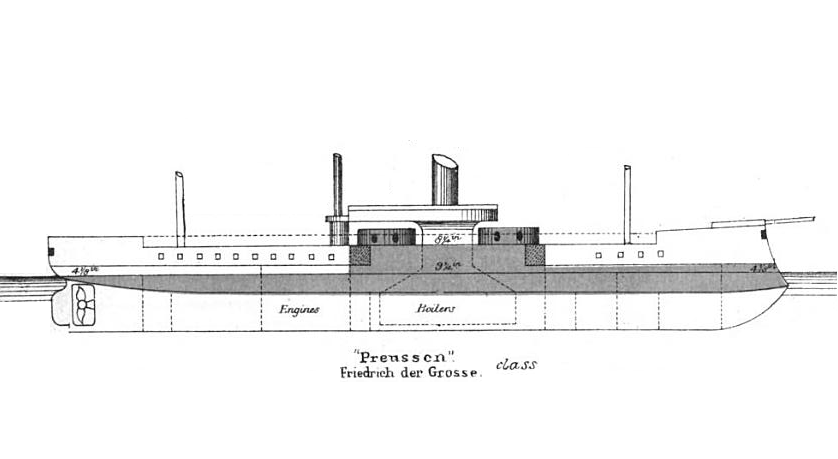
Profile drawing of SMS Preussen

The three Preussen-class ironclads were authorized under the naval program of 1867, which had been approved by the Reichstag (Imperial Diet) to strengthen the North German Federal Navy in the wake of the Second Schleswig War, when the weak, then-Prussian Navy had been unable to break the blockade imposed by the Danish Navy. Initially ordered as casemate ships, the vessels were re-designed as turret ships; they were the first uniform class of ironclads built by for the German fleet.

The ship was 96.59 meters (316.9 ft) long overall and had a beam of 16.30 m (53.5 ft) and a draft of 7.12 m (23.4 ft) forward. Preussen was powered by one 3-cylinder single-expansion steam engine, which drove a single screw propeller. Steam was supplied by six coal-fired transverse trunk boilers, which were vented into a single funnel. The ship's top speed was 14 knots (26 km/h; 16 mph), at 5,471 metric horsepower (5,396 ihp). She was also equipped with a full ship rig. Her standard complement consisted of 46 officers and 454 enlisted men.

She was armed with a main battery of four 26 cm (10.2 in) L/22 guns mounted in a pair of gun turrets placed on the centerline amidships. (Note: "L/22" denotes the length of the gun in terms of caliber. A 22 caliber gun is 22 times as long as it is wide in diameter, so a 26 cm L/22 gun is 572 cm (225 in) long.) As built, the ship was also equipped with two 17 cm (6.7 in) RK L/25 chase guns, one in the bow and one in the stern. After being rebuilt in 1888–1890, her armament was increased by six and later ten 8.8 cm (3.5 in) L/30 quick-firing guns, a pair of machine guns, and five 35 cm (14 in) torpedo tubes, all submerged in the ship's hull.

Preussen's armor was made of wrought iron and backed with teak. The armored belt was arrayed in two strakes. The upper strake was 203 mm (8 in) thick; the lower strake ranged in thickness from 102 to 229 mm (4 to 9 in). Both were backed with 234 to 260 mm (9.2 to 10.2 in) of teak. The gun turrets were protected by 203 to 254 mm (8 to 10 in) armor on the sides, backed by 260 mm of teak.

== Service history ==
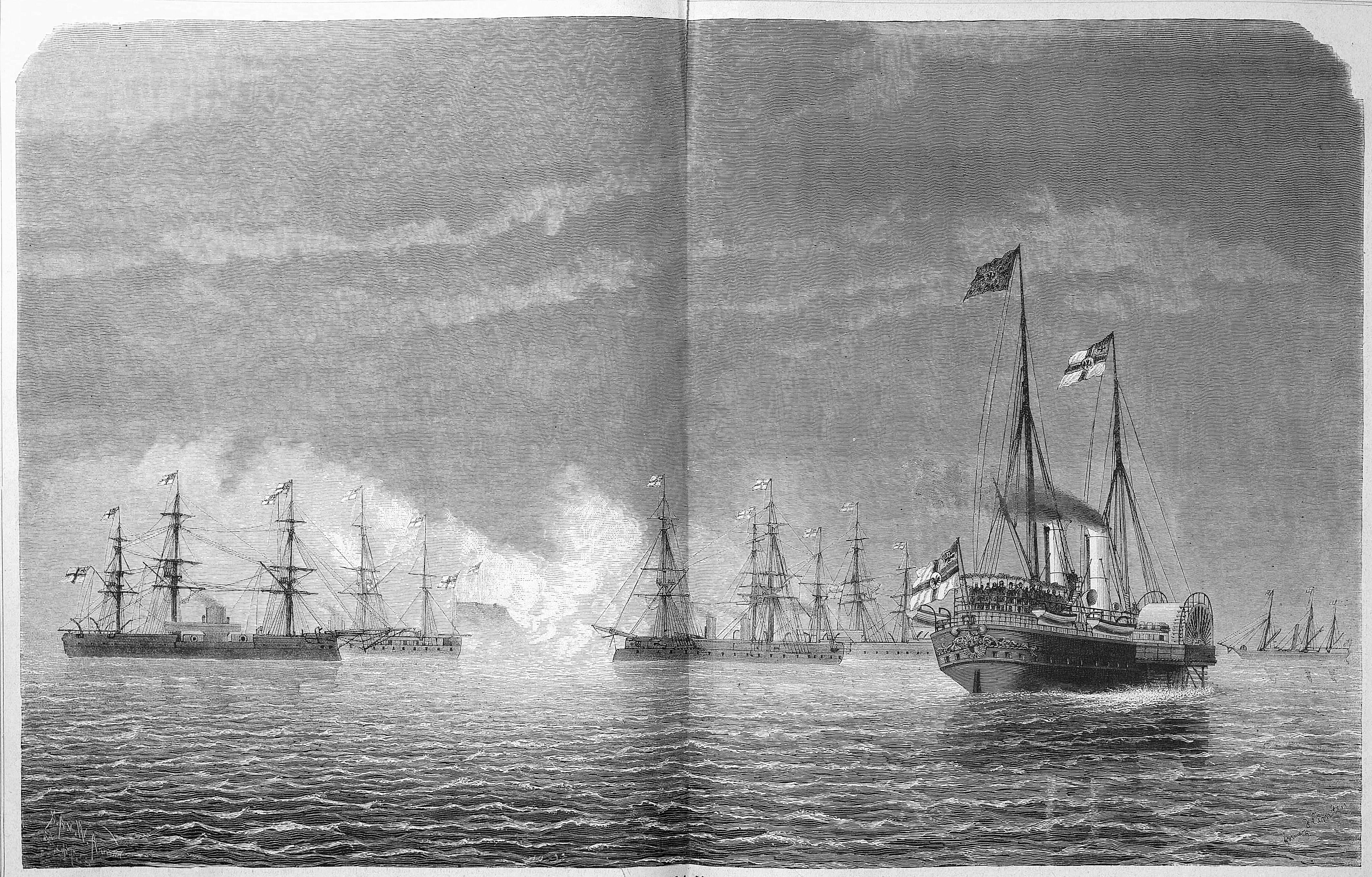
Illustration of the fleet conducting maneuvers, including Preussen and several other ironclads and other vessels

=== Construction – 1878 ===
Preussen was ordered by the Imperial Navy from the AG Vulcan shipyard in Stettin; work on the ship was delayed by the start of the Franco-Prussian War. Her keel was laid down in 1871 under construction number 66, after the war ended in a Prussian victory and German unification. This was the first time a private German shipbuilder was given a contract to build a large warship for the navy. The ship was launched on 22 November 1873, and during the ceremony she was christened by Crown Princess Victoria. After completing fitting-out work, apart from her armament, she was towed to Swinemünde on 23 November 1875. The ship was commissioned into the German fleet on 4 July 1876 and then moved to Kiel, where her guns were installed at the Kaiserliche Werft (Imperial Shipyard). Although she was the third and final ship in her class to be laid down, she was the first to be launched and commissioned. This was because her two sisters, Friedrich der Grosse and Grosser Kurfürst, were built by newly established Imperial dockyards, while Preussen was built by an experienced commercial ship builder.

After work on the ship was completed in late 1876, the ship began sea trials on 16 November. These were interrupted by the need to use the vessel's strengthened hull to break ice in the Baltic Sea for merchant vessels. This activity ended on 2 March 1877, allowing Preussen to resume trials, which concluded on 5 May. Two days later, she was assigned to the Ironclad Squadron to replace the ironclad Kronprinz, which was in need of an overhaul. The ironclad squadron, led by the flagship Kaiser, departed for the Mediterranean Sea on 30 May in response to unrest in the Ottoman Empire related to the Russo-Turkish War; the violence threatened German citizens living there. The squadron, which also included the ironclad Deutschland, the armored frigate Friedrich Carl, and the aviso Falke, was commanded by Konteradmiral (KAdm—Rear Admiral) Carl Ferdinand Batsch. The ships steamed to the ports of Haifa and Jaffa in July 1877, but found no significant tensions ashore. Batsch then departed and cruised the Mediterranean for the remainder of the summer, returning to Germany in October. On the way back, Preussen stopped in La Goulette, French Tunisia, by herself. She was badly damaged by severe weather on the way back to Germany, and after arriving 21 October, was dry-docked for repairs. She remained in commission, but had her crew reduced while the work was being carried out.

Diagram of the maneuvers of the German flotilla

In April 1878, Preussen participated in the fleet maneuvers, again under Batsch's command. By this time, she was joined by her two sister ships, Friedrich der Grosse and Grosser Kurfürst. The Ironclad Squadron was then to take a training cruise to the Mediterranean. After departing Germany on 29 May, the squadron proceeded through the English Channel, where the armored frigate König Wilhelm accidentally rammed Grosser Kurfürst; the latter quickly sank with the loss of 276 men. Preussen did not immediately begin rescue operations, and instead steered a wide circle before anchoring some 800 m (2,600 ft) away; she only picked up two men who had first been rescued by a British fishing trawler. Preussen then escorted the damaged König Wilhelm to Portsmouth, where the Royal Navy made available a dry dock for emergency repairs.

Albrecht von Stosch, the chief of the Kaiserliche Marine, ordered Batsch and his staff to return to Germany immediately aboard Preussen, escorted by Falke. The ships got underway on 3 Juneand arrived in Wilhelmshaven two days later; from there, they proceeded to Kiel, where they arrived on 10 June. Preussen's commander came under criticism for his failure to assist in the rescue operations directly, but he defended himself by arguing that he had followed the relevant regulations and that he could not have brought his vessel closer owing to the number of smaller fishing vessels in the area. Stosch accepted the explanation, but an inquiry led by KAdm Reinhold von Werner came to the opposite conclusion, which became part of a major controversy in the German naval command and eventually resulted in Werner's forced retirement.

The Mediterranean cruise was immediately cancelled, and within a week, the annual summer maneuvers for 1878 were also canceled. Preussen took on a contingent of naval cadets for a short training cruise in the Baltic, and later joined the screw corvette Prinz Adalbert for a training cruise with Prince Heinrich of Prussia aboard. On 9 November, Preussen was decommissioned for the winter.

=== 1879–1888 ===
On 5 May 1879, the armored squadron was reactivated, composed of Preussen, her sister Friedrich der Grosse, and the old armored frigates Kronprinz and Friedrich Carl. The annual summer training cruise was primarily conducted just in the Baltic Sea, apart from a short voyage in June to the coast of Norway. During the cruise, the ships stopped in Russia, where they were met by Tsar Alexander III; after returning to Germany, they were visited by Kaiser Wilhelm I in Danzig Bay. Preussen was also used to tow a new floating dry dock from Swinemünde to Kiel. The four ships returned to Kiel in September, where they were demobilized for the winter. On 24 March 1880, Preussen was reduced to the reserve fleet temporarily, before being reactivated on 3 May for service with the Ironclad Squadron. Wilhelm von Wickede, a former Austrian naval officer, replaced Batsch as the squadron commander. Again, the squadron remained in the Baltic for the summer cruise, with the exception of a short visit to Wilhelmshaven and Cuxhaven in August. During squadron exercises in July, Preussen was visited by Stosch, Crown Prince Friedrich, and his son, Prince Wilhelm.

The summer cruise in 1881 followed the same pattern as the year previous. Wickede again served as the commander. In July, the ships hosted a visit by the British reserve squadron, which by this time included the first British ironclad, HMS Warrior. Preussen and the rest of the squadron visited Danzig in September during a meeting between Kaiser Wilhelm I and Alexander III. Preussen saw active service in 1882 from 2 May to 25 September. The summer cruise included the same four ironclads from the previous year, and was again commanded by Wickede, who had by then been promoted to Konteradmiral. Preussen was kept in reserve during the annual summer maneuvers starting in 1883, as new ships, including the four Sachsen-class ironclads entered service. From 1883 to 1884, the ship underwent a modernization that included new boilers and a reconstructed poop deck. Her sailing rig was also reduced at that time. Further modernization work was carried out beginning in 1885, including the addition of two 37 mm (1.5 in) Hotchkiss guns and five submerged torpedo tubes were added in the hull. The work was completed on 4 November 1888, though she was not immediately recommissioned. She was instead assigned to the newly formed Reserve Division of the North Sea.

=== 1889–1919 ===
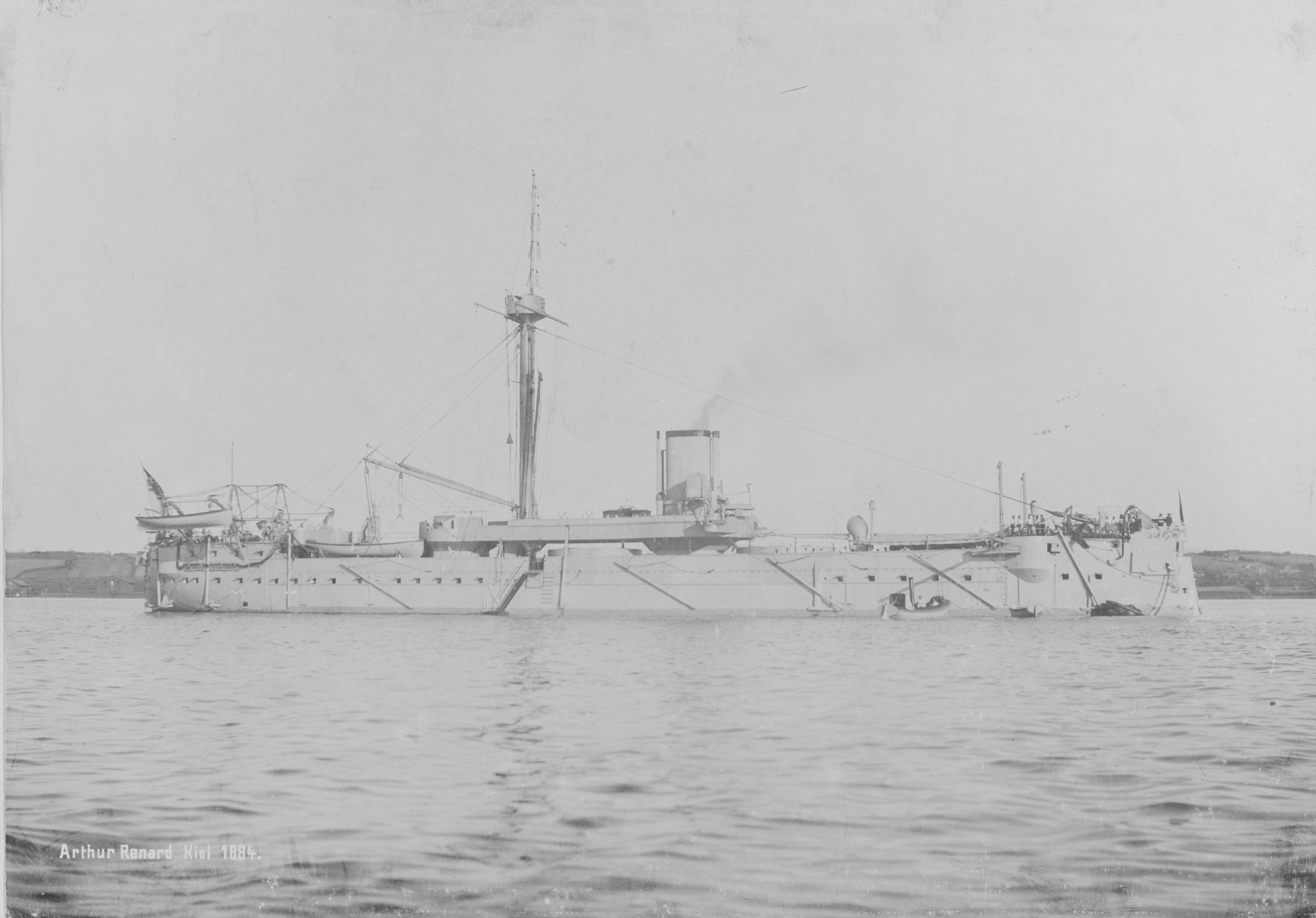
Preussen sometime after 1890

The ship was recommissioned on 1 May 1889 to take part in the annual summer training program with the fleet. These included exercises that began on 1 July. In August, Preussen participated in Kaiser Wilhelm II's first visit to Great Britain. The ship was assigned to II Division, along with her sister Friedrich der Grosse and the central battery ironclads Kaiser and Deutschland, under command of KAdm Friedrich von Hollmann. The fleet then conducted maneuvers in the North Sea before returning to Germany. Preussen and the rest of II Division became the Training Squadron for the fleet in 1889–1890, the first year the Kaiserliche Marine maintained a year-round ironclad force. The squadron escorted Wilhelm II's imperial yacht to the Mediterranean; the voyage began on 30 August and included state visits to Italy and the Ottoman Empire. The squadron remained in the Mediterranean through the spring of 1890, when it returned to Germany. The ships arrived back in Germany on 22 April.

Preussen returned to the Training Squadron, which was reorganized on 11 May. In June, she escorted the Kaiser on a state visit to Christiana, Norway. The ship participated in the ceremonial transfer of the island of Helgoland from British to German control in the summer of 1890. She was present during the fleet maneuvers in September, where the entire eight-ship armored squadron simulated a Russian fleet blockading Kiel. II Division, including Preuseen, served as the training squadron in the winter of 1890–1891. The squadron again cruised the Mediterranean, under the command of Konteradmiral Wilhelm Schröder. The voyage began on 12 November and concluded on 18 April 1891. After returning to Germany, Preussen underwent an extensive overhaul. The ship was recommissioned in mid-May 1891 for a final round of fleet maneuvers with II Division. Following the end of the training year, she was decommissioned for the last time on 9 October. She was reduced to a harbor guard ship at the end of 1891.

From 9 January to 11 July 1893, the ship was assigned to the Reserve Division of the North Sea. She was based in Wilhelmshaven as a harbor ship starting on 16 November 1896. She was renamed Saturn on 12 November 1903, so her name could be reused on the new battleship Preussen. The ship was formally stricken from the naval register on 21 May 1906. She was subsequently used as a coal hulk for torpedo boats. After being converted for this use, Saturn could hold up to 5,000 t (4,900 long tons; 5,500 short tons) of coal. She was eventually sold for scrapping on 27 June 1919 and broken up that year in Wilhelmshaven. Her figurehead is on display in the Militärhistorisches Museum der Bundeswehr in Dresden, while her bow ornament is located in the Deutsches Museum in Munich.
