= 26 cm RK L/22 =

1860s Krupp naval artillery gun

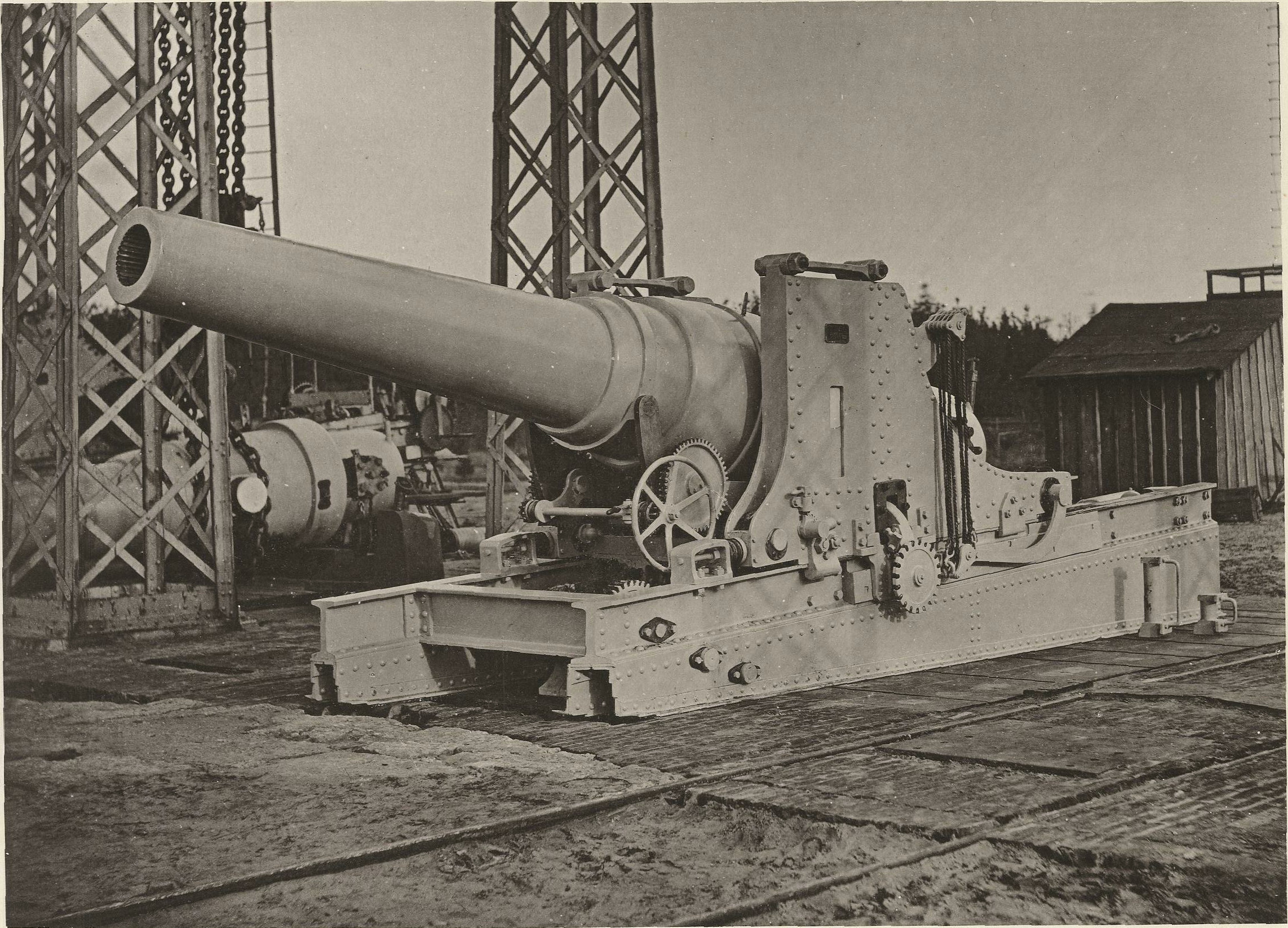
- The 26 cm RK L/22 M1870
- Type: Naval gun
- Place of origin: Kingdom of Prussia

Service history
- Used by: Imperial German Navy; Austro-Hungarian Navy; Turkey

Production history
- Designer: Krupp
- Designed: 1869
- Manufacturer: Krupp
- Produced: 1870

Specifications
- Mass: 22,000 kg
- Length: 5,720 mm (L/22)
- Caliber: 260.0 mm (Austrian) 262.5 mm (German)
- Breech: horizontal sliding wedge
- Muzzle velocity: 428 m/s. (Austrian in 1880); 490 m/s (German)

The 26 cm RK L/22 was a gun from a family of Krupp naval artillery guns designed in the late 1860s. The gun was used on warships of the Imperial German Navy and the Austro-Hungarian Navy. During World War I, it was used as coastal artillery by the Ottoman Empire.

== Context ==
=== Arming the fleets ===
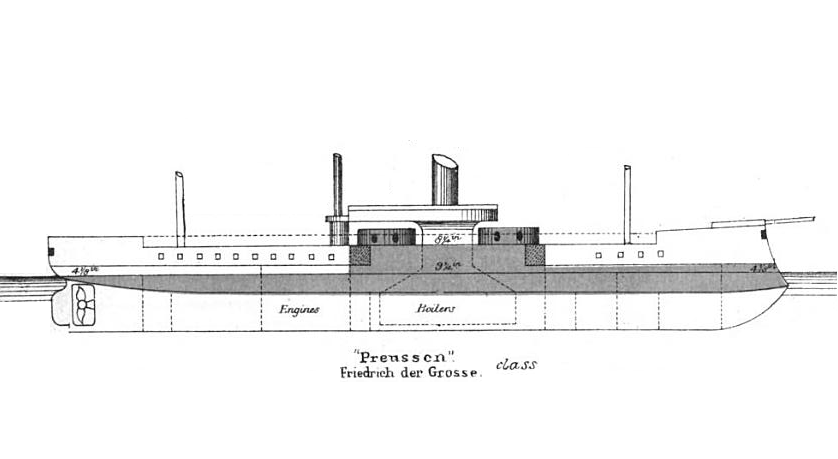
The turrets of Preussen

In 1868 comparative tests between Armstrong and Krupp heavy guns showed the superiority of the latter. The small North German Federal Navy then thought of the caliber system it wanted to use for its small fleet and its coastal defense. For its armored frigates which had broadside batteries it would use the short 21 cm and the short 24 cm gun. Longer versions of these guns would be used as chase guns.

For the projected Preussen-class ironclads, the 26 cm caliber was chosen, with the long 17 cm caliber as chase guns. The original Preussen class design would be changed to make it a class of turret ships. The order for the gun makes it seem as if it was especially meant for turret ships.

However, Austria Hungary also placed an order for the gun, and it used it to arm the casemate ironclad SMS Custoza. It shows that while its weight made it unsuitable as a broadside gun, the 26 cm RK L/22 could be used in many other roles.

=== Labels ===
The caliber system at first led to labels that consisted of the caliber, and (if necessary) the type of gun and whether it was long or short. The 26 cm gun was first known as '26 cm Ring Kanone (10"ge)'. As there was only one type of 26 cm gun, this was changed to '26 cm Kanone' in 1871. Soon after, a shorter variant was ordered, and so the gun became the 'lange 26 cm Ring Kanone'. However, as longer guns appeared, this led to confusion. In 1885, the German navy then adopted a naming system that included the length in calibers. The gun then became known as 26 cm Ring Kanone L/22, abbreviated to 26 cm RK L/22.

== Design and development ==
=== The first 26 cm gun ===
In Fall 1869 the Prussian Naval Ministry ordered Krupp to design a long 26 cm gun to be used only on the turret ships. In December next Krupp delivered the design. As designed, the barrel weighed 22,000 kg. It should fire chilled iron grenades with a velocity of 422 m/s, using a charge of 32 kg. On the inside, it had 36 grooves with a twist length of 70 calibers. The rifled part was 15 calibers long. The depth of the grooves of the 26 cm test barrel was 3.2 mm.

In 1870, the Admiralty ordered 8 26 cm guns at Krupp. The first 26 cm gun was delivered according to this design in 1871. The other guns were not finished on the inside. It would be tested against armor for the first time in August 1872. Another characteristic of this first gun was its caliber, i.e. 26 cm. This was probably too obvious to mention, but later it would deviate from the name.

=== Tests ===
At the end of 1872, the long 26 cm was still under test. As it was intended for a class that was from complete. Meanwhile, the use of prismatic pulver led to a desire to make the length of bore as long as possible. For the long 26 cm, it led to changing the length of the rifled part to 13.3 caliber. Tests also showed that parallel grooves were better than wedge grooves (Keilzüge).

When the German Admiralty requested Krupp to design a lighter version of the 26 and 17 cm guns, Krupp answered with a January 1872 memo. Krupp proposed that instead, it would increase charges, change the driving band from lead to copper, shift to parallel grooves, and introduce a progressive twist rate. The Admiralty then forwarded these proposals to the Artillerie Prüfungskommission (Artillery test commission).

The matter of finalizing the interior design of the long 26 cm gun now became part of switching to copper driving bands. In December 1874, the Admiralty decided to return to soft lead driving bands for the 26 cm gun.

=== Gunpowder ===
After the first 26 cm guns had been ordered, some success was obtained in the very complex matter of developing a gunpowder that burned slower. By 1871, Krupp had developed a new sort of prismatic powder. It allowed to increase the charge of the 26 cm gun from 32 to 37.5 kg, because it led to lower peak pressures than the previous gunpowder. In 1875, a new kind of prismatic pulver was tested. This was the gunpowder P.P. c/75. It made that the charge of the 26 cm gun could be increased to 47 kg of gunpowder.

=== Projectiles ===
The design of the chilled cast iron hartguss and the Lang Granate for the 26 cm gun was determined in December 1869.

== The Austrian 26 cm L/22 gun ==
SMS Custoza with 26 cm barrels sticking out

In 1871, Austria ordered 8 26 cm Ring Kanonen. It turns out that these were very similar to the first design that Krupp made for the German Navy.

The Austrian 26 cm L/22 would be used on board the casemate ship SMS Custoza. In 1880, this Austrian gun was described as: caliber 260 mm, length 5,720 mm, 32 grooves, twist length 70 calibers, weight 22,000 kg, breech 885 kg, and firing height of the carriage 1,185 m. It fired a steel grenade of 179.5 kg and a long grenade of 160.7 kg. The charge was 32 or 27 kg. The velocity was 428 or 420 m/s.

The Austrian gun was subject to a particular test in 1874 or before. It then fired a steel grenade of 179.5 kg and an ignition grenade of 160.7 kg. The steel grenade achieved a velocity of 426 m/s with a charge of 32 kg. For the ignition grenade, this was 370 m/s with a charge of 22 kg.

In 1887 these guns were described as 26 cm breechloaders. The barrel weighed 22 tons, the breech 885 kg, the carriage 8,520 kg, and it shot a projectile of 179.5 kg. The difference was in the charge. It now used a charge of 43.5 kg. The latter points to the Austrian gun later being adapted to slow burning gunpowder.

== The German 26 cm RK L/22 ==
=== The increase in caliber ===
The German navy had quite some time to test the 26 cm gun. The 21 and 24 cm guns had priority, and work on the Preussen-class ironclads was delayed by the lack of inexperience to construct such ships. Extensive testing of the gun showed that it would be useful to decrease the depth of the grooves of the gun, and to increase the charge. As part of the first order, only one of the 26 cm guns had been finished on the inside. Therefore, gun No. 2 was adapted. This gun was probably delivered in 1874. It got a rifled gun chamber which was bored out for an extra 220 mm, so it could accommodate a charge of 47–48 kg.

The most remarkable change had to do with the grooves. In order to obtain more shallow grooves, the barrel was bored out. The original caliber of 260 mm (measured between the grooves) became 262.5 mm, and so the depth of the grooves was reduced from 3.2 to 1.95 mm. There were 36 grooves with a 50 caliber long constant twist.

In the Summer of 1876, the changed gun No. 2 was tested. With a charge of 48 kg of PP c/75, the long grenade was fired with a velocity of 490 m/s at 50 m/s from the muzzle. For the chilled cast iron grenade this was 480 m/s. In October 1876 the Admiralty determined that this would be the construction of the gun. Hence the precise designation Lanage 26 cm Ring Kanone c/76.

=== Powder chamber and gunpowder ===
It was a general trend to increase the charge and also the size of the powder chamber of the Krupp Ring Kanonen. This obscures another trend, that is the decrease in the amount of space that each kg of gunpowder had to expand. E.g. in 1869, when the early Prismatic Pulver c/68 was used the average Krupp gun gave a kg of c/68 1,400-1,460 cm^{3} to expand. In 1876, when the PP c/75 was used, this was 1,263 cm^{3} for the long 26 cm gun with a 48 kg charge. This resulted in a peak pressure of 2,570-2,870 Atm.

=== Changed projectiles ===
In July 1875, the German Artillery Test Commission again pressed for copper driving bands on the projectiles for the heavy artillery. This led to new projectiles for the long 26 cm gun. The regular long grenade became 2.6 caliber long with a diameter of 260.5 mm. The chilled cast iron grenade was somewhat shorter at 2.5 caliber. These projectiles became known as c/76.

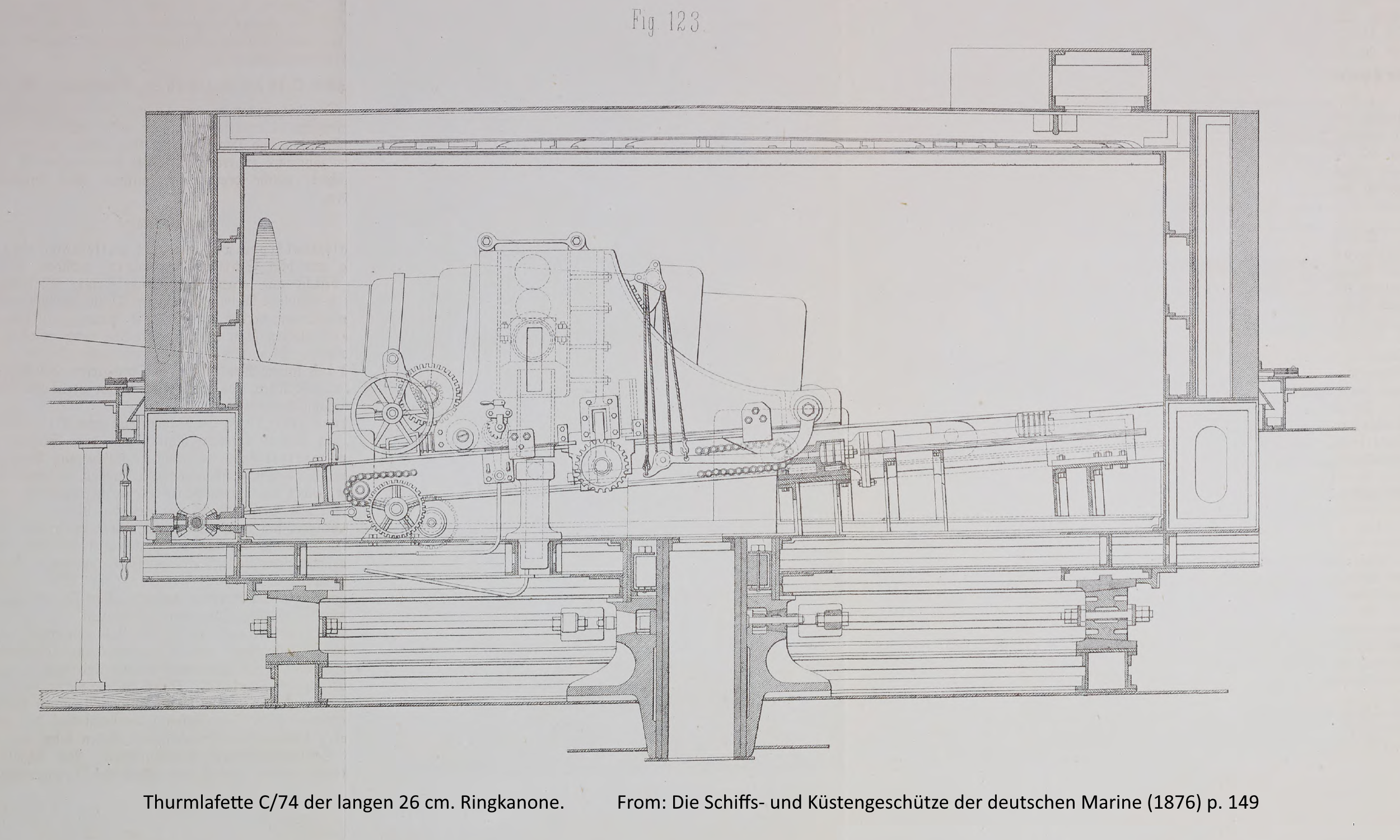
On a c/74 turret carriage

=== Durability test ===
The long 26 cm No. 2 was subjected to a durability test. Until Spring 1877 it fired 423 shots, of which 315 with a 47 or 48 kg charge. By then it was declared unserviceable for war, because it was no longer sure that it could withstand another 200 shots. Tests continued and in February 1878 it had fired 709 shots.

=== Carriages ===
As it would be placed in the turrets of the Preussen-class ironclads, the 26 cm RK would stand on the Thurmlafette c/74. This carriage was something special. It was a kind of minimum port carriage, that achieved elevation and declination by changing the firing height. That is, the trunnions could be moved into three positions: 1,477 mm, 1,727 mm, and 1,977 mm. See the image of the turret, but also the 1870 image of the gun. On the latter, the carriage does not show the trunnions of the gun.

There was also a Thurmlafette c/76 with a fixed firing height of 1,920 mm. This was used on board SMS Friedrich der Grosse, also of the Preussen class. It allowed the guns to elevate to 11° and to decline to 6.5°.

== Use ==
=== German Navy ===
The 26 cm RK L/22 was used on board the three Preussen-class ironclads, which each had two pairs of guns in two cupolas. This is in line with the 8 26 cm guns that the German Navy ordered at Krupp in 1870. In 1872 it ordered 4 more lange 26 cm Ring Kanonen and 8 kurze 26 cm Ring Kanonen. In 1873, it ordered one more lange 26 cm Ring Kanone. (Probably to replace the gun in the durability test, see above) In 1874, the German Navy ordered 12 more 26 cm Ring Kanone, probably short ones.

=== Austria ===
Austria used its own version of the 26 cm RK L/22 on board SMS Custoza.

=== Turkey ===
In 1873, Turkey ordered 10 26 cm guns.

== Further development ==
In 1875 Krupp began to switch from the Ring Kanone (RK) construction to the Mantel Ring Kanone (MRK). Already in 1876, even when the long 26 cm guns were not yet finished, the Admiralty decided that the next 26 cm gun would be a 19,000 kg MRK with 48 grooves.
