= 21 cm RK L/19 =

1870 Prussian Navy breech loader gun

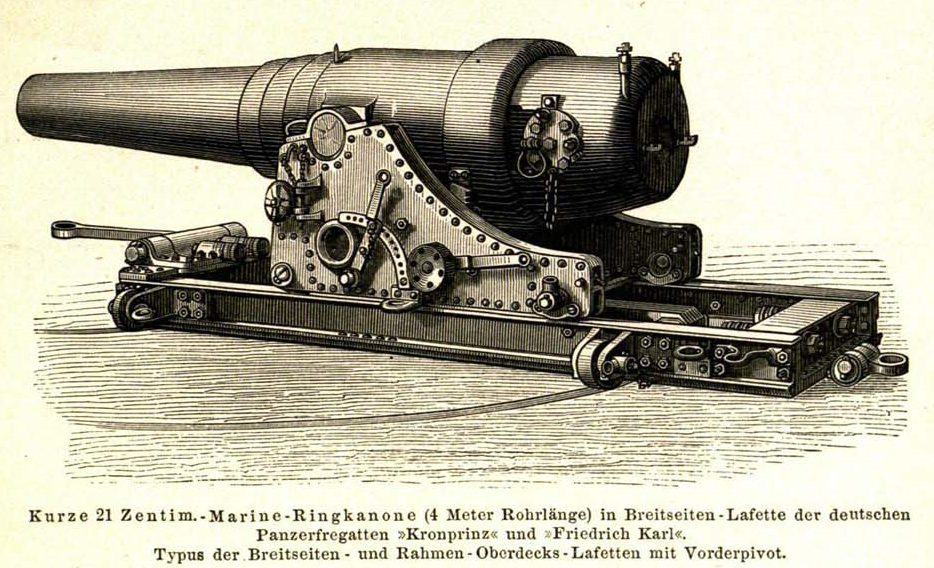
- Krupp 21 cm RK L/19 gun on a broadside carriage
- Type: Naval gun; Coastal artillery
- Place of origin: German Empire

Service history
- In service: cc 1870
- Used by: Prussian Navy; Imperial German Navy

Production history
- Designer: Krupp
- Manufacturer: Krupp

Specifications (L/19)
- Mass: 9,390 kg
- Length: 3.923 m (L/19)
- Caliber: 209.5 mm
- Breech: Horizontal sliding breech
- Muzzle velocity: 425 m/s
- Effective firing range: 3,750 m at 9.5°

The 21 cm RK L/19 was the later name of a rifled breech loader gun of the Prussian Navy. This gun started with a massive gun barrel, cast from steel in one piece. In 1868 a built-up gun barrel version was tested in Prussia and found to be much more powerful. Many of the massive guns were then changed to built-up guns. These changed guns became known as kurze Ring Kanone, and later as 21 cm Ring Kanone L/19.

== Massive steel gun barrels ==
=== Krupp breechloaders for the Prussian navy ===
In 1858, Prussia decided to use rifled breechloading guns of 9, 12 and 15 cm caliber for the fortress and siege artillery. This would also lead to replacing the smoothbore coastal and ship guns with these rifled guns.

However, tests against mock-up targets in 1860 and 1861 showed that while the 12 and 15 cm were satisfactory against wooden ships, they were almost useless against the standard 114 mm ship armor of the time. In mid-April 1862, this led to a recommendation to develop a 36-pdr caliber (17 cm) gun.

In late April 1862, another advice was to develop a 19.3 cm (48-pdr caliber) cast iron gun of about 5,500 kg. However, in the April 1864 Battle of Dybbøl the Danish ironclad Rolf Krake proved virtually immune to German artillery. From April to July 1864 new tests showed that on average, with a powder charge of 5 kg, the 19.3 cm gun would penetrate the standard 114 mm armor, but not the supporting layer of wood. During these trials, one of the 19.3 cm guns ripped and both suffered much from usage. Conclusions from the trials were that cast iron did not suffice for the gun, that the 19.3 cm caliber was too small, and that relative to the weight of the shot, the charge of the gun was too light.

=== Krupp gets orders from Russia ===
Meanwhile, Russia was quick to adapt the Krupp cast steel barrels. In 1863 it ordered 88 8 inch (20.33 cm) and 16 9 inch (22.86 cm) guns at Krupp, probably still muzzle loaders. In 1864 it tested Krupp 4-pounder field guns with two sliding wedge breech systems: the double breech and Krupp's simple breech. It then ordered 48 field guns with both types of breech. It also ordered test barrels with both types of breech for all calibers up to 9 inch. These orders gave Krupp the opportunity to expand its manufacturing and research capabilities.

Meanwhile, Russia furthered the foundation of the Obukhov Factory, which copied the Krupp designs.

=== The sliding wedge breech ===
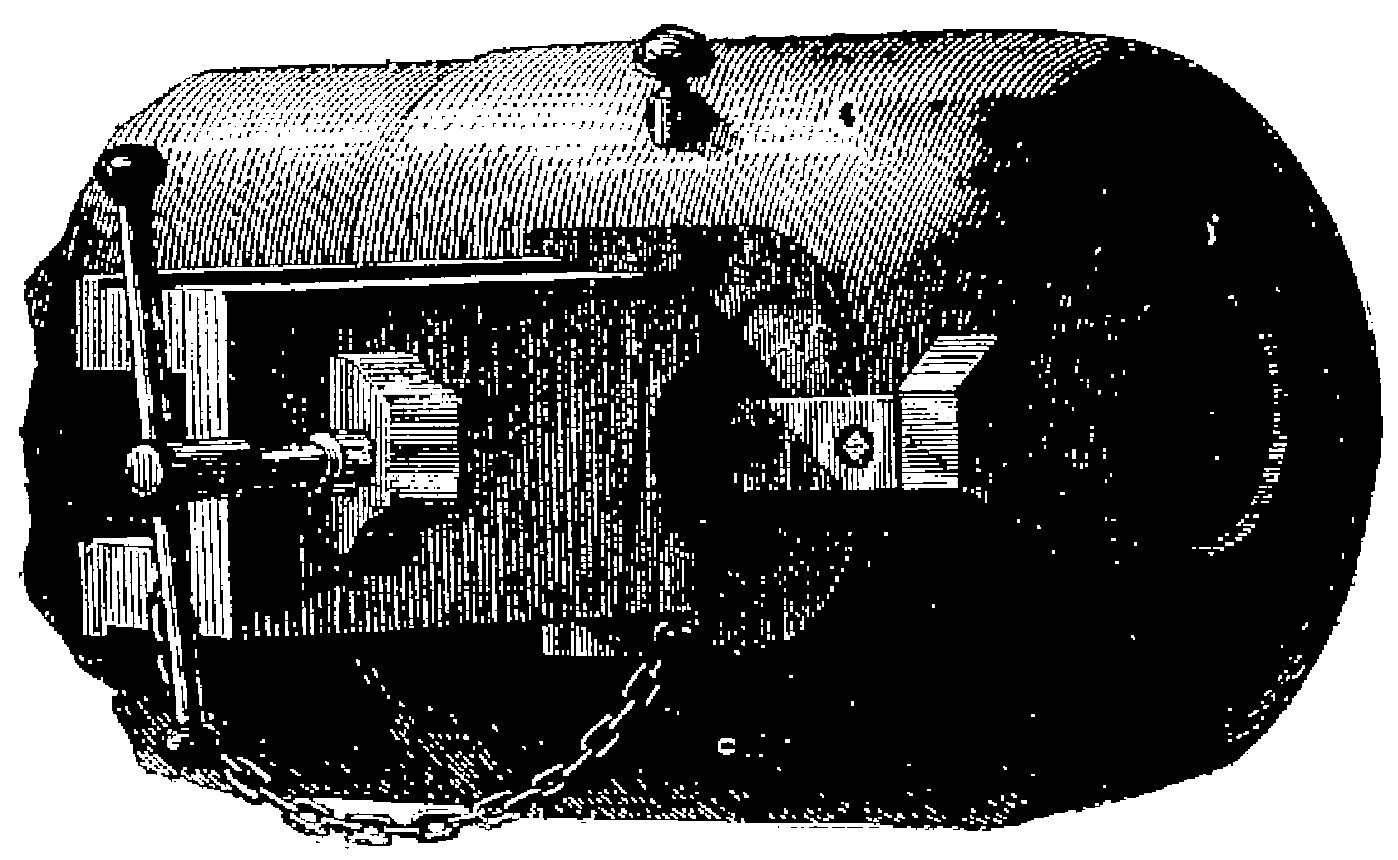
Sliding wedge with square edges

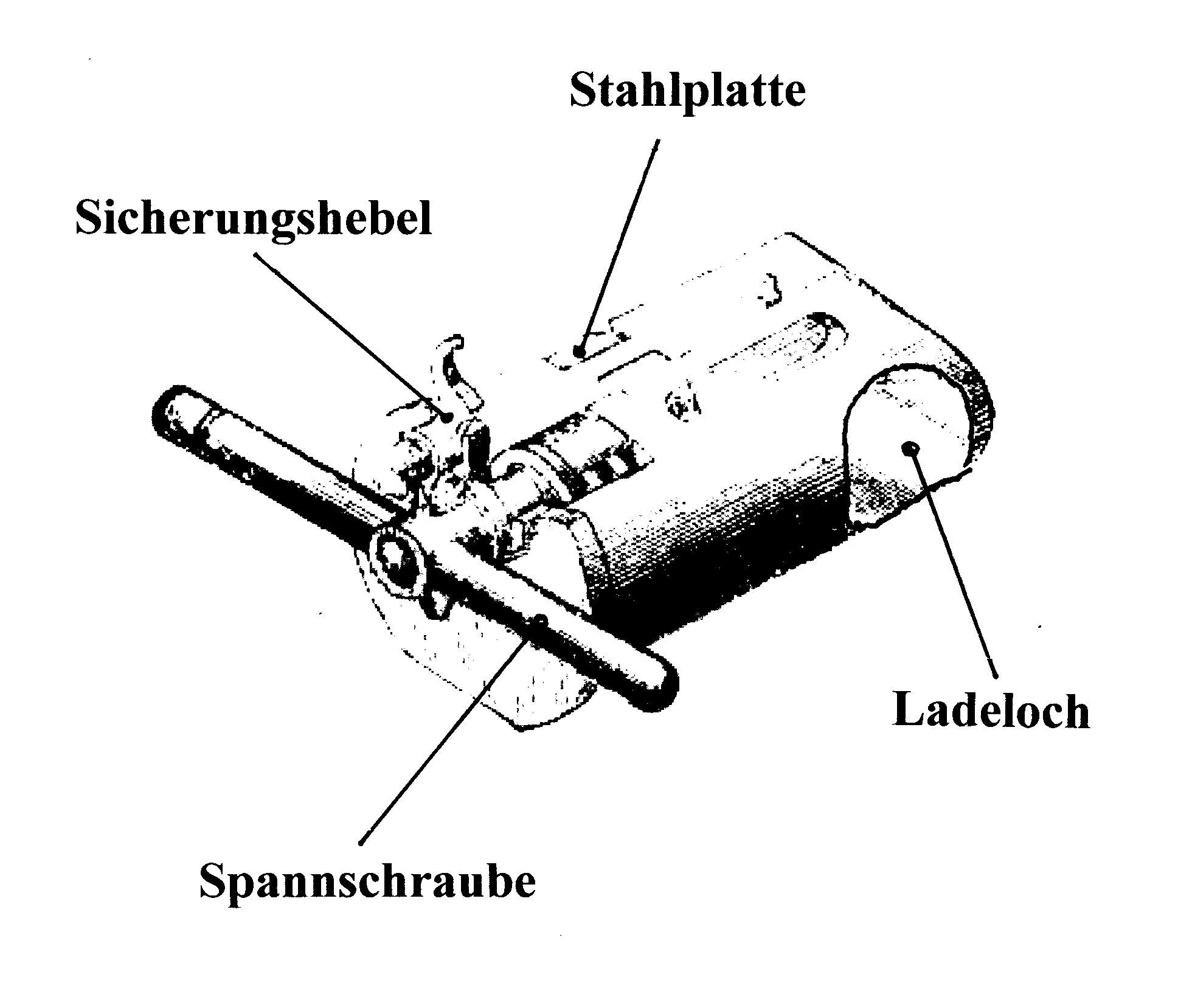
Cylindroprismatic breech block called Rundkeil

Many gun manufacturers used a breech loading system that closed the rear opening of the gun barrel, often with a screw like breech block. Krupp used the approach to slide a wedge through the rear part of the gun, the so-called sliding wedge breech block. Up till 1864 the Krupp sliding wedge breech called simple breech had an almost square diameter, only the corners of the breech hole were a bit rounded. That year Krupp invented the cylindroprismatic (halbcylindrischen) type of sliding wedge breech called Rundkeil, which it patented in 1865.

The Rundkeil was much more reliable, because it led to a more even distribution of forces. It was extensively tested in 1865, also with a light 21 cm (8 in) gun. These tests showed that a cylindroprismatic breech allowed for an over 50% lighter construction of the barrel near the breech. In 1866 Russia then switched to the Rundkeil by ordering 600 field guns with this system. For heavier calibers, a similar breech lock was invented by Krupp in 1868.

=== The 21 cm gun of 135 Ztr (6,750 kg) ===
In Fall 1864 the department of the navy ordered a 72-pdr rifled breechloader at Krupp, which it also designed. This would later be called the short massive steel gun of 21 cm, but the actual caliber was 207.6 mm. The barrel was made of massive steel and cast in one piece. It fired an about 100 kg shot and weighed 135 Ztr, or 6,750 kg. The first four barrels had a square double sliding breech. A later fifth barrel had a square simple sliding breech. These guns were 3,766 mm long.

The gun design would obviously solve some challenges, but the exact powder charge was still a matter of experiments. While the gun was tested with a charge of 9 kg in August 1865, the fifth barrel showed a rip in the barrel near the breech lock. Krupp then proposed some alterations, and got the order to make a redesign in 1865.

In August 1865, Five more barrels were then ordered to a redesign by Krupp. Four had the simple cylindroprismatic breech, while only one had a cylindroprismatic double breech so comparative tests could be held in December 1866. The navy ministry then decided to use a cylindroprismatic double breech, primarily because the lighter calibers already used a double breech, which had proven itself with the gunpowder charges used at the time.

In 1865 trials were held with the 21 cm gun and the 17 cm gun. On small and medium distances, the 21 cm gun with 8 kg charge would penetrate standard 114 mm armor with wooden backing with each shot. The 17 cm gun with 5 kg charge could not do that.

=== The 21 cm gun of 180 Ztr (9,000 kg) ===
The 21 cm gun of 135 Ztr had too much recoil. In general this leads to inaccuracy and damage to the carriage. In July 1867 the Prussian navy therefore ordered 10 heavier guns. These guns would use a slightly increased maximum charge, i.e. from 9 to 11 kg. In order to fit an existing carriage, they would be only a very little bit longer (total length of 3,923 mm), but in order to diminish recoil, they would be 45 Ztr heavier. This was very inefficient, because the added weight would not serve to make a stronger gun barrel. These guns had a cylindroprismatic double breech.

The Prussian war Office also ordered 10 of these barrels, destined for coastal defense. These barrels used Krupp's simple cylindroprismatic breech.

The Prussian war office and the navy also ordered two comparable bronze guns for trials.

=== The Austrian 21 cm gun of 7,124 kg ===
In 1865 Austria ordered 24 massive 8 inch guns. These had Krupp breeches and Broadwell rings. The very first barrel still had a square breech block, while all the later ones had a cylindro-prismatic breech block. The first gun had to be delivered in March 1866. Some more followed later.

The caliber of these guns was 8". According to a description, this was to be taken as 'Rheinlandische' inches. As this inch is the same as the Prussian inch, the caliber of this Austrian gun was the same as the Prussian. The Austrian gun weighed 12,699 Wiener Pfund, or 7,124 kg, including a breech block of 491 kg and a rear counter weight of 454 kg.

These guns were later changed to Ring Kanone 21 cm L/20.

== The Ring Kanone is developed ==
=== The Ring Kanone ===
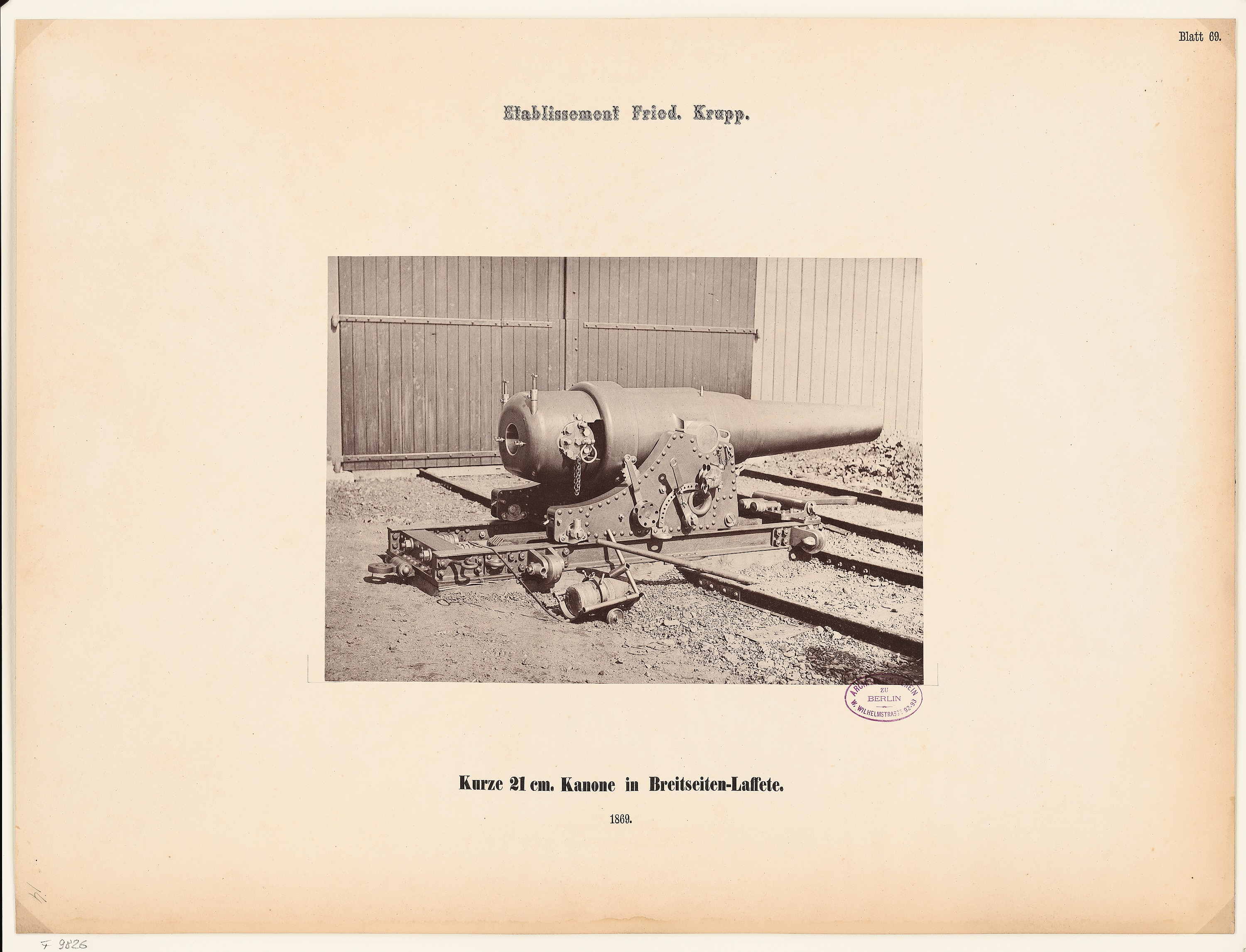
21 cm RK L/19 in 1869

The Ring Kanone was a type of built-up gun. It means that the barrel was constructed in layers. This allows to pre-stress the innermost tube of the barrel, allowing it to withstand much higher pressures. The invention of the abovementioned simple cylindroprismatic breech in 1864 was essential for developing the Ring Kanone, because it allowed to use much less metal near the breach, which in turn allowed a rational construction of the Ring Kanone. Krupp's work on the barrel itself heavily used the work of the Russian general Axel Gadolin, who had built on Lamé's work regarding elasticity and developed a practical application.

In 1866 Krupp created an 8" Ring Kanone and tested it. That same year Russia ordered 25 8" Ring Kanone, and a single 9" one. The latter was tested in Russia in 1867, and led to an order for 62 more 9" Ring Kanone in 1868.

=== Inch and Zoll ===
At the time, the first Prussian 21 cm Ring Kanone was called an 8 zöllige Ring Kanone. Zoll was the German word for inch. The Prussian Zoll was 26.154 mm, so 8 zoll is 209.2 mm. This is very close to te 209.5 mm given for the short 21 cm Ring Kanone, and exactly the same as the 20.92 cm of the later 21 cm RK L/22. It differs significantly from the 207.6 mm of the older massive guns. This explains why in one of Krupp's own histories of the first years that it manufactured guns, the older barrels were consistently referred to as 72-pdr. The new Ring Kanone were referred to as 8 zöllig.

=== Trials against the Woolwich gun ===
In January 1867 the Prussian Navy ordered two 9 inch Ring Kanone at Krupp (later known as 24 cm guns), both with the cylindroprismatic breech. The Prussian Navy also bought a RML 9-inch Armstrong Gun, a so-called Woolwich gun, which were muzzle loading British rifled guns. These were made for the Royal Navy in Woolwich, and for export by the Armstrong company in Elswick. It also had the 21 cm gun of 180 Ztr, ordered in July 1867.

In March 1868 trials of the 21 cm 180 Ztr and the 24 cm Ring Kanone were held against targets that represented the recent increases in armor thickness. The results were very bad, both guns failing against 178 and 124 mm armor.

Since a few years, the Boulengé chronograph enabled measurement of the speed of projectiles. The measuring device allowed the Prussians to see that the 24 cm gun fired with a much lower velocity than the British 9-inch gun. Even after increasing the powder charge to 25 kg, it did not get further than 361 m/s. The British 9 inch gun fired at 404 m/s.

In a 2 June 1868 direct trial between the Prussian 24 cm Ring Kanone and the British 9 inch gun, the British gun then showed itself clearly superior to the Krupp 24 cm Ring Kanone. The Krupp proponents concluded that the shot and the pulver which had been used were no good, and that the construction of the barrel had to be adapted for heavier charges.

The Prussian navy now began to press for the British gun, because the ironclads Friedrich Carl, Kronprinz and König Wilhelm had to be armed. On 20 June 1868 the defence minister then decided to delay the decision on this armament by six weeks. During this period, the proponents of the Krupp guns had to prove that by using slower burning prismatic gunpowder and ignition through the breech block, the 24 cm Krupp guns could achieve the same results as the British 9-inch muzzle loader. Already on 7 July 1868, a 24 cm Krupp gun that used a high load of prismatic gunpowder and ignition through the breech block, as well as new shot, clearly beat the Armstrong gun in a new trial.

=== The prototype 21 cm Ring Kanone of 8,750 kg ===
The reason to build a prototype 21 cm Ring Kanone was that the March 1868 trials had been even worse for the massive 21 cm gun of 180 Ztr than for the 24 cm Ring Kanone. The 21 cm gun fired at a very low speed of 320 m/s vs 347.5 m/s for the Krupp 24 cm and 404 m/s for the Woolwich gun. Therefore, the initial reaction was to increase the charge from 11 to 12.5 kg. However, this increased velocity by only 10 m/s, and it broke the double cylindroprismatic sliding breech of the gun. Therefore, the charge was reduced back to 11 kg. In the 20 June order that gave Krupp six weeks respite for the 24 cm gun, there were also orders to adapt a 21 cm gun for the cylindroprismatic sliding breech and breech ignition. It did not mention a 21 cm Ring Kanone

In mid-1868 it was clear that fixing the breech and the ignition would not be enough to get a satisfactory 21 cm gun. The charge had to be increased, and that could not be done with a massive barrel. In August 1868 Krupp then offered a 21 cm or 8 inch Ring Kanone with simple cylindroprosmatic breech and breech block ignition to the War Office for testing. This had been tested with a powder charge of 13 kg, but was designed to withstand a charge of 17 kg.

One can wonder how Krupp produced this new 21 cm Ring Kanone so quickly. The obvious explanation is that Krupp was already producing Ring Kanone for Russia, see above. However, the prototype gun itself was made from an existing 21 cm 180 Ztr gun. The powder room was bored out to the detriment of the length of the rifled part of the barrel. To compensate, the rifled part of the barrel towards the mouth was lengthened. The breech, caliber, and rifling remained the same. Much of the outer layer of the barrel was sliced off, and this was replaced with a lighter outer tube that made the barrel stronger. The total weight of the prototype barrel was 175 Ztr, or 8,750 kg.

Therefore, there were two 72-pdr guns of the 180 Ztr type in the 22 September 1868 trials. One was the 21 cm gun of 180 Ztr changed only to have a cylindroprismatic breech and ignition through the breech. The other gun was this prototype of the 21 cm Ring Kanone, which was of the same caliber. In detail the powder chamber of the prototype was 138 mm longer. The part of the barrel that was rifled was 372 mm longer than that of the 180 Ztr gun, 2,935 vs 2,563 mm.

Already on 30 September 1868, the Artillerie Prüfungskommission (Artillery Test Commission) noted that the new 21 cm Ring Kanone with simple breech was very powerful and much better than the previous 21 cm guns and the British Rifled muzzle loaders. It only required some work on its accuracy. For the prototype 21 cm Ring Kanone, the use of prismatic gunpowder increased its velocity from 354 to 424 m/s. In September 1868 trials with the 21 cm Ring Kanone showed that with a charge of 17 kg of prismatic gunpowder, it was equal to or even superior to the 24 cm gun firing with 24 kg of the same. This made that both guns were superior to the 9 inch Woolwich gun. However, for the 21 cm Ring Kanone, this had only been proven on small and medium distances.

After a duration trial proved that the 9 inch Woolwich gun was far less durable than the 24 cm Krupp gun, the War Office decided to cease all experiments with muzzle loading guns in January 1869.

== The 21 cm RK L/19 ==
=== The 21 cm RK L/22 ===
The 21 cm RK L/22 was the gun that Krupp would design based on all these trials. This became possible after the War Office decided to cease all experiments with muzzle loading guns in January 1869. This finalized the choice between Armstrong's system of Woolwich guns and Krupp's breech loading system. That year Krupp then got the order to design longer versions of the 24 and 21 cm guns, leading to the development of the 21 cm RK L/22.

With a new design, Krupp succeeded in increasing the length of the 21 cm Ring Kanonen by 3.3 calibers to 4.71 m. The gun got the name Langer Ring Kanone 72-pdr 180" lang 195 ztr. (180 Prussian inch = 470.7 cm, 195 ztr=9,750 kg) The barrel later got the name "lange 21 cm Ringrohre", the complete gun became the "lange 21 cm Ring Kanone". This became official in August 1871, when the German guns got new names based on the Metric system. In 1885 the lange Ring Kanone became the 21 cm RK L/22.

=== The 21 cm RK L/19, a converted gun ===
The 21 cm RK L/19 was created by adapting the old massive guns. The navy had Krupp change some of her 21 cm guns of 9,000 kg to short 21 cm Ring Kanone, which later became the 21 cm RK L/19. The length of 150" (3,923 mm) shows that the navy made the "kurze 21 cm Ring Kanone" from the 9,000 kg massive guns.

The first name for the adapted gun was "Kurzer Ring Kanone 72-pdr 150" lang". In August 1871 this became "Kurze 21 cm Marine Ring Kanone". At the same time the older massive 21 cm guns also got new names. The "72-pdr 144" lang of 135 ztr" became the "Kurze 21 cm Marine Stahl Kanone". The "72-pdr 150" lang of 180 Ztr" became the "21 cm Stahl Kanone". In 1885 the "Kurze Ring Kanone" became 21 cm RK L/19.

=== The Austrian 21 cm L/20 ===
The Austrian 21 cm L/20 can be considered to be a variant of the 21 cm RK L/19. When the Austrian massive 21 cm gun was changed to a built-up gun, the barrel was lengthened by two calibers in front, and shortened a bit at the rear. It was also adapted to be able to use the 17 kg charge used by the Prussian guns, and got breech ignition. After these changes, the barrel was 4,185 mm long and caliber was 209.2 mm. The barrel itself weighed 8,910 kg, and the breech block weighed another 490 kg. In trials, this adapted Austrian gun fired with a charge of 17 kg and then reached a velocity of 424 m/s. In April 1874, the elongated 21 cm gun was tested against armor in Pola.

== Use ==
=== As coastal artillery ===
The 10 lange 21 cm Stahl Kanone of the Allgemeines Kriegsdepartement would be lengthened and hooped, making them "21 cm Mantelrohre". This made it almost equal to the 21 cm RK L/22. These 10 guns were later sent to some land fortresses. This explains that they were not mentioned in the navy inventory later on.

=== Prussian and German ships ===
As reported elsewhere:

- The monitor SMS Arminius got four 21 cm L/19
- SMS Prinz Adalbert got one 21 cm L/19
- SMS Friedrich Carl would get two 21 cm RK L/22 and fourteen 21 cm L/19
- SMS Kronprinz would get two 21 cm RK L/22 and fourteen 21 cm L/19
- SMS Hansa had eight 21 cm L/19

=== Austrian ships ===
- The three Kaiser Max-class ironclads each had eight 21 cm RK L/20
