= SMS Kronprinz =

Two ships of the German Kaiserliche Marine (Imperial Navy) have been named SMS Kronprinz:

- SMS Kronprinz (1867), an armored frigate launched in 1867
- SMS Kronprinz (1914), a dreadnought battleship launched in 1914, later renamed Kronprinz Wilhelm

== See also ==
- SS Kronprinz Wilhelm
