= SMS Friedrich Carl =

Two ships of the German Kaiserliche Marine (Imperial Navy) have been named SMS Friedrich Carl:

- SMS Friedrich Carl (1867), an ironclad warship launched in 1867
- SMS Friedrich Carl (1902), an armored cruiser launched in 1902

== See also ==
- SS Friedrich Karl
- Friedrich Carl (disambiguation)
