= 21 cm RK L/22 =

1870 German Navy rifled breechloader

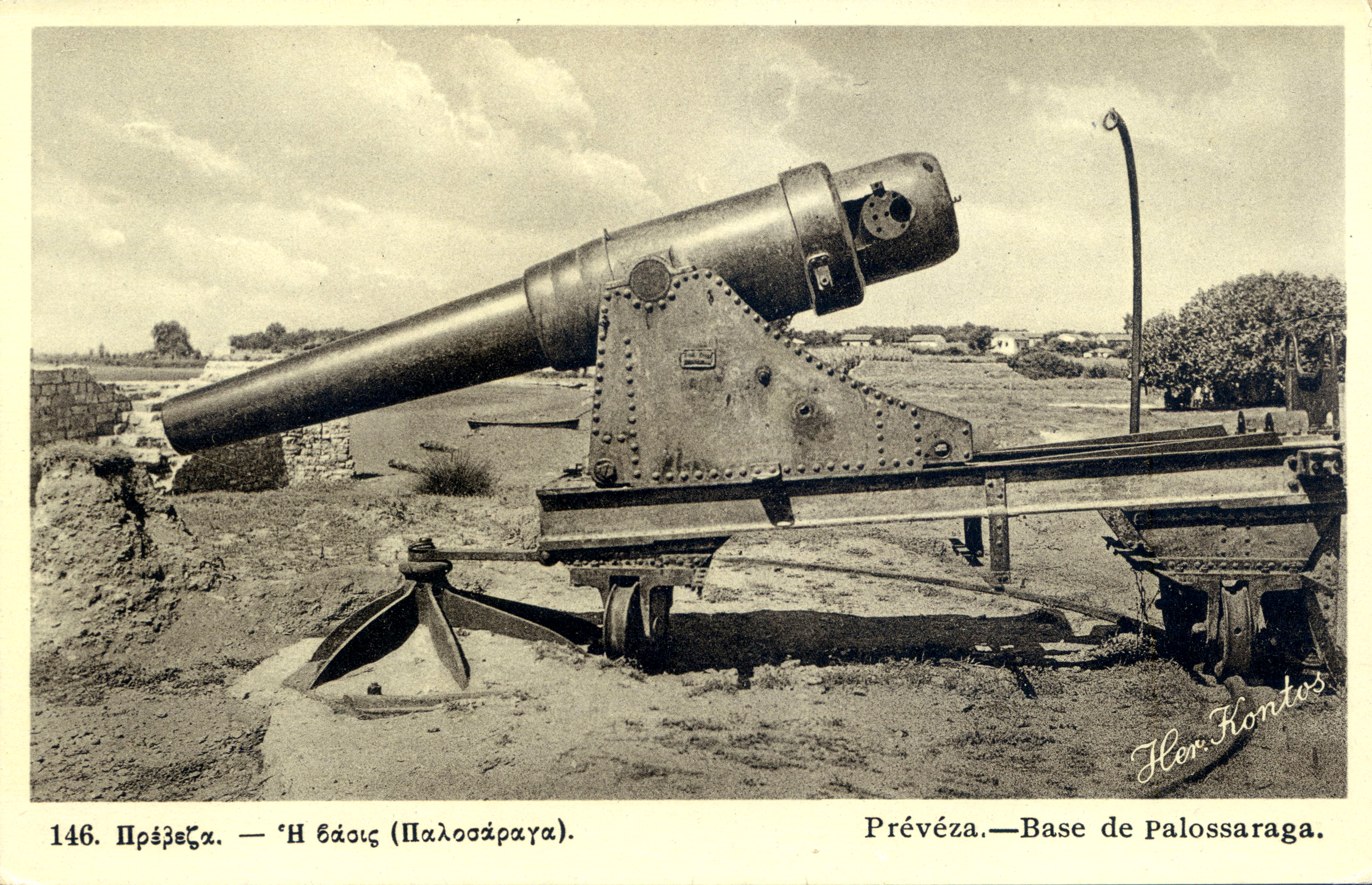
- Turkish 21 cm RK L/22 in Preveza, Greece
- Type: Naval gun; Coastal artillery
- Place of origin: Kingdom of Prussia

Service history
- In service: 1870
- Used by: Imperial German Navy; Turkey

Production history
- Designer: Krupp
- Manufacturer: Krupp

Specifications
- Mass: 10,327 kg (22,767 lb)
- Length: 4.708 m (15 ft 5.4 in) L/22
- Caliber: 209.2 mm (8.24 in)
- Breech: horizontal sliding wedge
- Muzzle velocity: 446 m/s.
- Effective firing range: 6,000 m (20,000 ft) at 14.10° elevation

The 21 cm RK L/22 was a 21 cm caliber Krupp gun that was purposefully designed to use a combination of prismatic gunpowder, a built-up gun barrel, and the Krupp cylindroprismatic sliding breech with broadwell ring.

== Background ==
After it had become clear that rifled cannon were required to penetrate armored ships, Prussia had set on a system of rifled breechloaders. When 15 cm (5.9 in) and 19.3 cm (7.6 in) caliber designs proved insufficient to penetrate standard 114 mm (4.5 in) armor plating, Prussia began to look at the 21 cm caliber.

In Fall 1864, the Prussian department of the navy ordered a 21 cm rifled breechloader, which it also designed. The barrel would be made of steel instead of iron, and would be massive (i.e. cast in one piece). It was followed by a similar 24 cm gun and a heavier 9,000 kg version of the 21 cm gun.

Meanwhile, Prussia had bought a RML 9-inch Armstrong Gun. This was a so-called Woolwich gun, which were muzzle loading British rifled guns. Prussia then held trials of this gun against the massive 21 cm gun and a 24 cm built-up gun it had acquired. In early and mid 1868, these trials showed that the Krupp 21 cm gun fired projectiles at a much slower speed than the British 9-inch gun, i.e. 320 m/s vs 404 m/s. The 24 cm built-up gun called Ring Kanone was much better, but still way too slow.

Krupp understood that a built-up gun barrel was necessary to withstand the increased gunpowder load required to match the power of the Woolwich guns. It made a prototype version of the massive 21 cm gun, with a barrel of the same length, but of a built-up construction. The powder chamber was bored out to accommodate a higher charge of (prismatic gunpowder), and it had a cylindroprismatic breech and a Broadwell ring. The new cylindroprismatic breechblock or Rundkeil (the German word 'Keil' means wedge), was as its name implies almost round. It was essential to withstand the higher explosive forces found in the built-up guns.

Already in late September 1868, it became known that this new 21 cm gun with simple breech was very powerful and much better than the previous 21 cm guns and the British rifled muzzle loaders. It only required some work on its accuracy. The war office then determined in late 1868 that all new guns of 21 and 24 cm would be built-up guns with Krupp's simple breech. It also decided to use ignition through the breech block.

In January 1869, the Prussian War Office decided to cease all experiments with muzzle loading guns. This decision finalized the choice between Armstrong's system of Woolwich guns and Krupp's breech loading system. Many of the existing Krupp 21 cm massive breechloaders were then converted to Ring Kanone. In August 1871, the German guns got new names based on the Metric system. The converted guns then got the name "kurze 21 cm Marine Ring Kanone". Later this name was changed to 21 cm RK L/19.

== Design and development ==
Now that Prussia had decided to use the Krupp system, it was time to make final designs that incorporated the knowledge that had been gained from the trials. In 1869 Krupp got the order to design longer versions of the 24 and 21 cm guns, but of the same weight. Gruson got orders to improve the shot. Meanwhile, they worked on designing an efficient gun carriage. Though the decision about whether the breechloaders would be made of cast steel or bronze was still open and would only be decided at a later date.

With a new design, Krupp succeeded in increasing the rifled length of the 21 cm Ring Kanone by 3.3 calibers to 4.71 m (15 ft 5 in). The weight of the gun was 9,950 kg (9.79 long tons). The breech block weighed another 377 kg.

The gun could fire an explosive Langgranate c\69 of 79.75 kg (175 lb 13 oz) and 2.5 caliber length. This had a velocity of 425 m/s (1,390 ft/s) at the mouth of the barrel. Maximum range with this shot was 6,000 m (20,000 ft). The hardened (Hartguss) shot c\69 weighed 98.25 kg (216 lb 10 oz). It had a velocity of 446 m/s (1,460 ft/s) at the mouth. Maximum range with this shot was 6,000 m.

The barrel got the name "lange 21 cm Ringrohre", the complete gun became the "lange 21 cm Ring Kanone". In 1885, the lange 21 cm Ring Kanone was renamed to 21 cm Ring Kanone L/22, abbreviated 21 cm RK L/22.

Meanwhile, the Woolwich guns started to use "Pebble gunpowder". This increased the velocity of the Woolwich guns and relative to gun weight, they were again more powerful, even though this did not apply to the 21 cm RK L/22. Krupp and the Germans responded by using a new prismatic powder, which allowed the use of a charge of 19 kg (41 lb 14 oz) for the 21 cm RK L/22. This increased velocity to 446 m/s.

=== Carriage ===
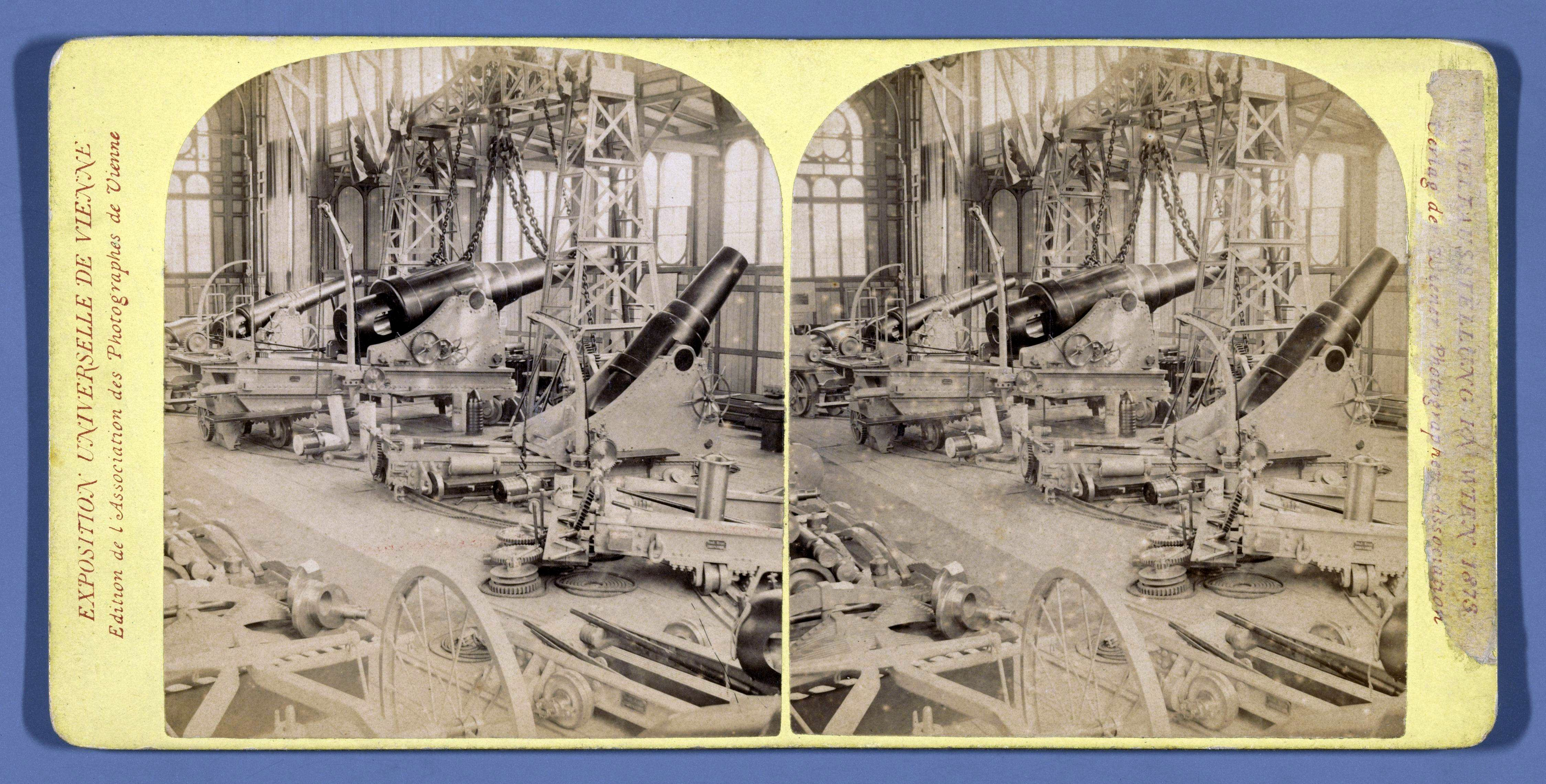
stereogram of Krupp guns displayed at the Vienna exhibition in 1873. The 21 cm RK L/22 is third from the right

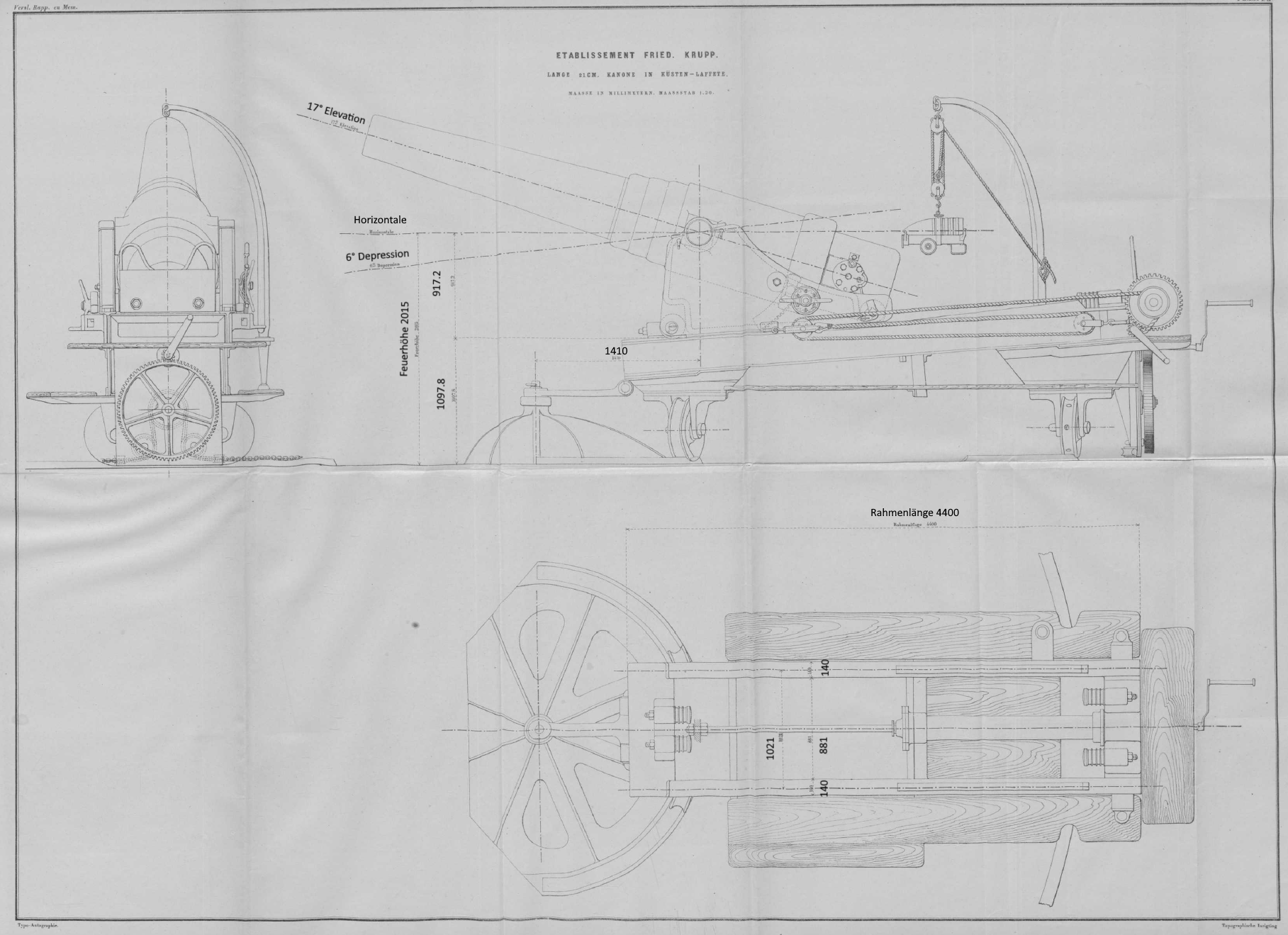
On a coastal carriage

For use in armored gun turrets, Gruson built the 21 cm Minimalscharten Lafette c/72. This served to bring the horizontal and vertical turning point of the gun to the gun port, instead of it being near the trunnions.

For coastal use, there were many standard carriages. The carriages used in the first trials were wrought iron broad side carriages from ships. These proved unsatisfactory, and so a design for new coastal carriages was made in the Sommer of 1866. This first model had a pivot in the center and after tests, it was judged unsuitable for war. In January 1868 the navy department had ordered an Amstrong ship carriage with a pivot on the front. In August 1868 the Artillerie Prüfungskommission (Artillery test commission) gave design guidelines for a new coastal artillery carriage. Krupp made a design and got an order for a single coastal carriage in Spring 1869. When the Franco Prussian War started in 1870, orders for carriages were quickly placed at Krupp and Gruson. These carriages became known as c/69 (Krupp) and c/70 (Gruson).

In 1870 the Prussian artillery test commission wanted to increase the gun protection against grenades coming in on a nearly flat trajectory. This required higher fortifications and a higher carriage. This led to the 21 cm Küsten Lafette für lange Ring Kanone 2 m Brustwehrhöhe c/73.

In the table below, 'Kst.L.' is short for Küsten Lafette, meaning 'coastal carriage'. The height of the trunnions was important to determine the maximum height of the protection in front of the gun.

Name in 1885	Org. name	Made by	Height	Weight	Comment
21 cm Kst.L. C/69 Nr I	21 cm Kst.L. für lange RK 1.6 m Brustwehrhöhe c/69	Krupp	2015 mm	7,000 kg	
21 cm Kst.L. C/69 Nr II	21 cm Kst.L. für lange RK	Krupp	2230 mm		
21 cm Kst.L. C/69 Nr III	21 cm Kst.L. für lange RK	Krupp	1800 mm		
21 cm apt. Kst.L. C/69		Krupp			Made from 24 cm Kst.L. used for 21 cm K L/22
21 cm Kst.L. C/70	21 cm Kst.L. für lange RK 1.6 m Brustwehrhöhe c/70	Gruson	2010 mm	6,500 kg	
?	21 cm Kst.L. für lange RK 2 m Brustwehrhöhe c/73		2367 mm	7,650 kg	
21 cm apt. Kst.L. C/79			2230 mm		
21 cm apt. Kst.L. C/85					Also used for 21 cm RK L/35

At the 1873 Vienna World's Fair Krupp exhibited its relatively new Ring Kanonen. The Krupp pavilion was visited by German and other military delegations. One of these included the Dutch captain Mazel. The Krupp agent gave him some detail about the exhibited guns. The long 21 cm gun on coastal carriage was on a carriage that weighed 7,200 kg and had the axis of the trunnions (height) at 2.015 m. This identifies the carriage as one that would later be named a c/69 carriage.

=== Obsolete ===
The development of the 21 cm RK L/22 kind of ended when Krupp started to develop the Mantel Ringrohr gun barrel. This consisted of a strong core in a weaker core and mantle, which were in turn surrounded by rings. This made a stronger gun barrel. In 1875/76 Krupp was testing a Mantel Ring Kanone of 21 cm with use of a 26 kg charge for a speed of 470 m/s.

== Use ==
=== Ships ===
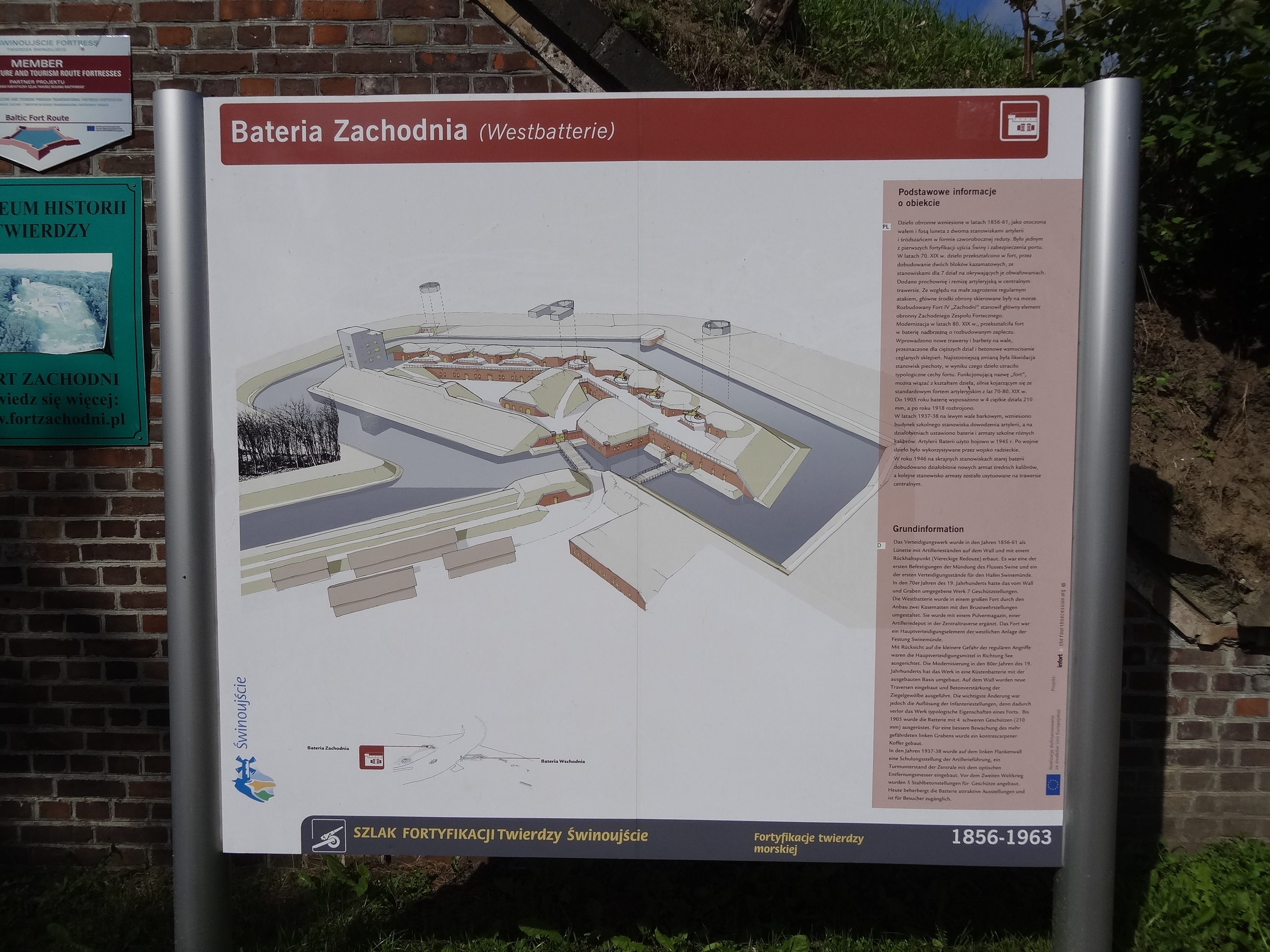
Western fort Świnoujście

- SMS Friedrich Carl (1867) would get 2 21 cm RK L/22 and 14 21 cm RK L/19
- SMS Kronprinz (1867) would get 2 21 cm RK L/22 and 14 21 cm RK L/19
- The two Kaiser-class ironclad had one 21 cm RK L/22 in her secondary armament

=== German coastal artillery ===
The first use of the 21 cm RK L/22 was during the 1870 Franco-Prussian War. About a dozen where hastily sent from the factory to defend the North Sea coast.

In Swinemünde / Świnoujście the 21 cm Ring Kanone was used in the Westbatterie, now the museum Zachodni Fort Artyleryjski.

Near Danzig, from 1896, the battery known in Polish as Bateria nr 11, W Lasku Brzeznienskim, was armed with 6 21 cm Ring Kanone on Coastal carriages.

=== Turkish coastal artillery ===
Turkey ordered 28 21 cm RK L/22 in 1873.

During the 1897 Greco-Turkish War a 21 cm RK L/22 was part of a coastal fortress called Hamidié Tabia just west of Preveza, now in Greece. This position was the only 19th century fortification at Preveza. The others were older stone fortifications without modern heavy artillery. On 19 and 20 April 1879 the Greek navy bombarded Hamidié Tabia, but this had little effect as the vast majority of the Greek grenades failed to explode. On 21 April, a 21 cm RK L/22 at Hamidié Tabia seems to have severely damaged the Greek ironclad Spetsai. At the time, the 22 caliber gun at Preveza was obsolete. In spite of its ammunition problems, the Greek navy should have been able to overcome it, if it had opted for a more direct attack instead of bombarding from a distance of 7–9 km.
