= SMS Friedrich Carl (1867) =

Armored frigate of the German Imperial Navy

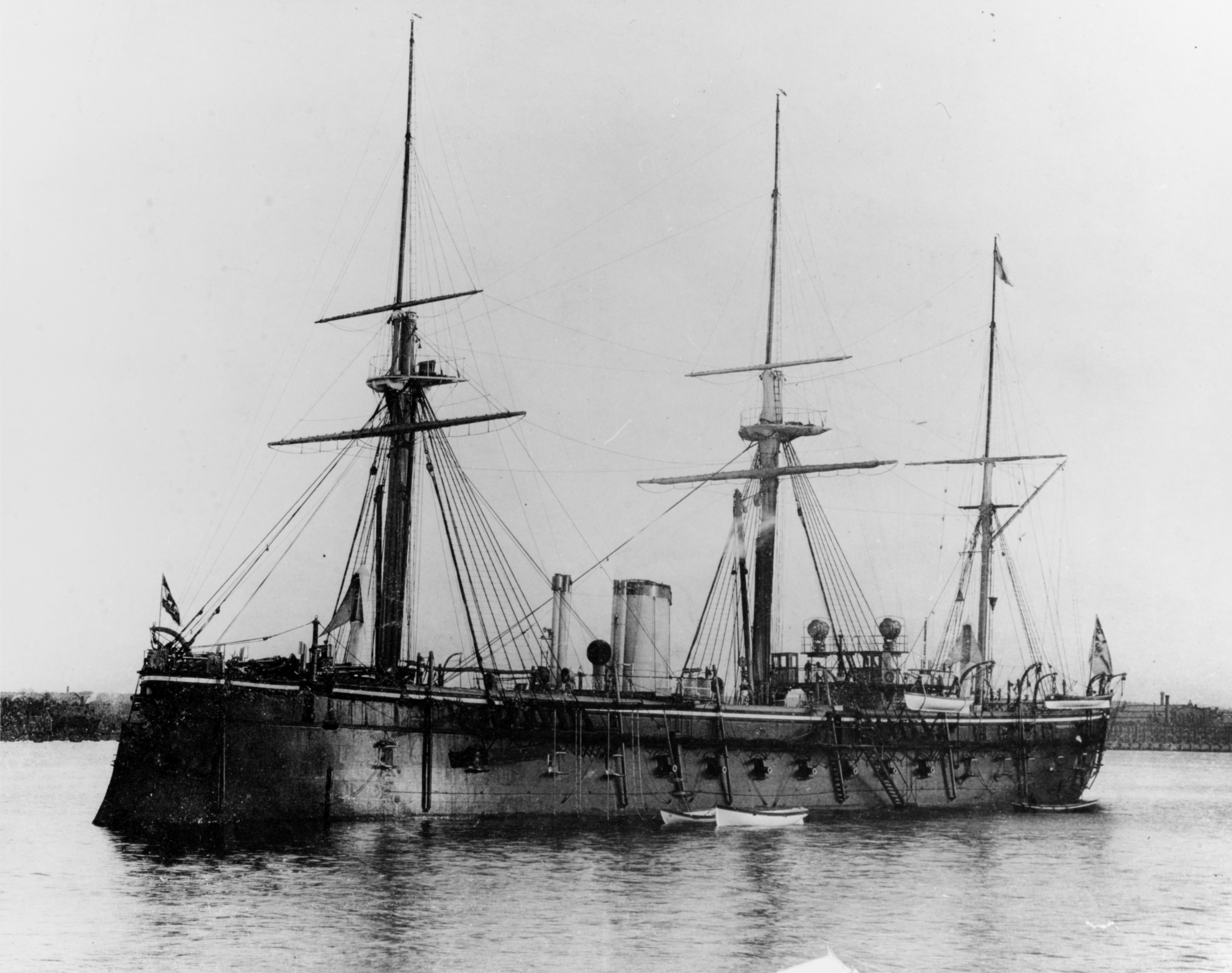
- Friedrich Carl in the late 1880s or early 1890s

Class overview
- Operators: Prussian Navy; Imperial German Navy
- Preceded by: Prinz Adalbert
- Succeeded by: Kronprinz

History

German Empire
- Name: SMS Friedrich Carl
- Builder: Société Nouvelle des Forges et Chantiers de la Méditerranée, La Seyne-sur-Mer
- Laid down: 1866
- Launched: 16 January 1867
- Commissioned: 3 October 1867
- Stricken: 22 June 1905
- Fate: Scrapped, 1906

General characteristics
- Type: Armored frigate
- Displacement: Full load: 6,932 t (6,823 long tons)
- Length: 94.14 m (308 ft 10 in)
- Beam: 16.60 m (54 ft 6 in)
- Draft: 6.90 m (22 ft 8 in)
- Installed power: 6 × boilers; 3,550 PS (3,501 ihp)
- Propulsion: 1 × single-expansion steam engine; 1 × screw propeller
- Sail plan: Barque-rigged
- Speed: 13.5 knots (25.0 km/h; 15.5 mph)
- Range: 2,210 nmi (4,090 km; 2,540 mi) at 10 knots (19 km/h; 12 mph)
- Crew: 33 officers; 498 enlisted men
- Armament: 2 × 21 cm (8.3 in) L/22 guns; 14 × 21 cm (8.3 in) L/19 guns
- Armor: Waterline belt: 127 mm (5.0 in); Conning tower: 114 mm (4.5 in)

SMS Friedrich Carl (Note: "SMS" stands for "Seiner Majestät Schiff", or "His Majesty's Ship".) was an ironclad warship built for the Prussian Navy in the mid-1860s. The ship was constructed in the French Société Nouvelle des Forges et Chantiers de la Méditerranée shipyard in La Seyne-sur-Mer; her hull was laid in 1866 and launched in January 1867. The ship was commissioned into the Prussian Navy in October 1867. The ship was the third ironclad ordered by the Prussian Navy, after Arminius and Prinz Adalbert, though the fourth ship to be acquired, Kronprinz, was ordered after but commissioned before Friedrich Carl.

Friedrich Carl served with the fleet from her commissioning in 1867 until 1895, when she was removed from front-line service to serve as a training ship. During the Franco-Prussian War in 1870–1871, the ship formed part of the main German squadron commanded by Vizeadmiral (Vice Admiral) Eduard von Jachmann. Engine trouble, however, plagued the ship and two of the other three vessels in the squadron; as a result, they made only two sorties from the port of Wilhelmshaven to challenge the French blockade. Neither resulted in combat.

Friedrich Carl was also deployed to Spain during an insurrection in 1873, during which she assisted in the seizure of three rebel vessels in two engagements. The ship was refitted at the Imperial Dockyard in Wilhelmshaven in the 1880s. She was renamed Neptun in 1902 and used as a harbor ship until June 1905, when she was removed from the naval register. The following year, she was sold to ship breakers in the Netherlands and dismantled for scrap.

== Design ==
Following the acquisition of the small ironclad warships Arminius and Prinz Adalbert, which were only usable in coastal areas, the Prussian Navy sought to acquire armored vessels capable of operations on the high seas. The purpose of the new ships would be primarily directed against Prussia's primary naval rival, Denmark, which in the recent Second Schleswig War had imposed a blockade of German ports that Prussia had not been able to break. Ironclads were at that time a recent development and the only option for sea-going warships was the armored frigate, modeled on traditional sailing ships with a battery on the broadside. The navy requested approval from the Landtag (Parliament) in 1865 for an expanded budget to acquire the needed vessels, but the parliament refused, prompting King Wilhelm I to circumvent the legislature with a decree on 4 July authorizing the purchase of two armored frigates.

At that time, Britain and France had the shipbuilders most experienced with the type, so the navy decided to order one vessel from each country. The contract for Friedrich Carl was placed on 9 January 1866 followed by that for Kronprinz four days later, from France and Britain respectively. The French-built Friedrich Carl was modeled on Couronne, albeit a smaller version of the French ironclad.

=== General characteristics ===
Friedrich Carl was 91.13 meters (299 ft) long at the waterline and 94.14 m (308 ft 10 in) long overall. She had a beam of 16.60 m (54 ft 6 in) and a draft of 6.90 m (22 ft 8 in) forward and 8.05 m (26 ft 5 in) aft. The ship was designed to displace 5,971 metric tons (5,877 long tons) at a normal loading, and up to 6,932 t (6,823 long tons) with a full load. The ship's hull was constructed with transverse and longitudinal iron frames. It contained eight watertight compartments and had a double bottom that ran for 76 percent of the length of the vessel.

Friedrich Carl was an excellent sea boat; the ship was responsive to commands from the helm and had a moderate turning radius. Steering was controlled with a single rudder. She was somewhat unbalanced, however, and a 6 degree rudder to port was required to keep the ship on a straight course. The ship's crew numbered 33 officers and 498 enlisted men, and while serving as a flagship, the crew was augmented with a command staff of 6 officers and 35 enlisted men. Friedrich Carl carried a number of smaller boats, including a large tender, two launches, a pinnace, two cutters, two yawls, and one dinghy.

A horizontal, two-cylinder single-expansion steam engine powered the ship. It drove a four-bladed screw propeller 6 m (19 ft 8 in) in diameter. Six trunk boilers, divided into two boiler rooms with eleven fireboxes in each, supplied steam to the engine at 2 standard atmospheres (200 kPa). Both boiler rooms were vented into a single funnel. The propulsion system was rated at 3,300 metric horsepower (3,255 ihp) and a top speed of 13 knots (24 km/h; 15 mph), though on trials Friedrich Carl managed to make 3,550 PS (3,501 ihp) and 13.5 knots (25.0 km/h; 15.5 mph). The ship carried 624 t (614 long tons) of coal, which enabled a maximum range of 2,210 nautical miles (4,090 km; 2,540 mi) at a cruising speed of 10 knots (19 km/h; 12 mph). A barque rig with a surface area of 2,010 square meters supplemented the steam engine, though in service they added little to the ship's performance.

=== Armament and armor ===
As built, Friedrich Carl was equipped with a main battery of twenty-six rifled 72-pounder cannon. After her delivery to Germany, these guns were replaced with a pair of 21-centimeter (8.3 in) L/22 guns and fourteen 21-centimeter (8.3 in) L/19 guns. The L/22 gun could depress to −5 degrees and elevate to 13 degrees, which provided a range of 5,900 m (6,500 yd). The shorter barreled L/19 guns had a wider range of elevation, from −8 to 14.5 degrees, but the shorter barrel imposed a lower muzzle velocity, which correspondingly reduced the range of the gun to 5,200 m (5,700 yd). The two types of gun fired the same shell, of which the total supply numbered 1,656 rounds of ammunition. The fourteen L/19 guns were placed in a central battery amidships, seven on either broadside. The L/22 guns were placed on either end of the ship to serve as chase guns.

Later in her career, six 37 mm (1.5 in) Hotchkiss revolver cannon were added to provide a defense against torpedo boats. Five 35 cm (14 in) torpedo tubes were also installed at that time. Two of the tubes were placed in the bow, two on the ship's sides, and one in the stern on the port side. All were placed above the waterline, and were supplied with a total of twelve torpedoes.

Friedrich Carl's armor consisted of wrought iron backed with heavy teak planking. The waterline armored belt consisted of 114 millimeters (4.5 in) of iron backed with 254 mm (10 in) of teak. Above the belt was a strake of iron plate of the same thickness of the belt, on 260 mm (10.2 in) of teak, which covered the central battery. The battery's roof was protected by 9-millimeter-thick (0.35 in) iron plating, intended to deflect shots that passed over the side of the ship or fragments from explosions. The ship's conning tower had 114 mm thick iron armor mounted on 400 mm (15.7 in) of teak.

== Service history ==
The Prussian Navy ordered Friedrich Carl from a French shipbuilder in 1865. She was laid down at the Société Nouvelle des Forges et Chantiers de la Méditerranée shipyard in La Seyne-sur-Mer the following year. The ship was launched on 16 January 1867; fitting out work was completed rapidly, and the ship was completed before the end of the year. Friedrich Carl was delivered to Prussia in October 1867 and commissioned into the fleet on the 3rd of the month. Crews for Friedrich Carl and Kronprinz were carried to the ships by the screw frigate Hertha and the screw corvette Medusa. Both ironclads were laid up without any armament on entering service, as the new guns that had been intended to have been installed suffered serious failures during testing in 1867–1868; the Kreiner breech blocks proved to be prone to failure and so Krupp-designed guns were installed instead, with the work completed by July 1869. in June 1870, Friedrich Carl collided with the Danish schooner Auguste Robert in the Dogger Bank. The schooner was abandoned; Dutch fishermen rescued her crew.

=== Franco-Prussian War ===
At the outbreak of the Franco-Prussian War in 1870, the greatly numerically inferior Prussian Navy assumed a defensive posture against a naval blockade imposed by the French Navy. Friedrich Carl and the broadside ironclads Kronprinz and König Wilhelm, along with the small ironclad ram Prinz Adalbert, had been steaming in the English Channel before the French declared war; they had left Plymouth on 10 July with the intention of steaming to Fayal in the Azores. On the 13th, however, they put into port and learned of the rising tension between France and Prussia. The ships therefore returned to Wilhelmshaven immediately, arriving on 16 July. France declared war on Prussia three days later on 19 July. Friedrich Carl, Kronprinz, and König Wilhelm were concentrated in the North Sea at the port of Wilhelmshaven. They were subsequently joined there by the turret ship Arminius, which had been stationed in Kiel.

Despite the great French naval superiority, the French had conducted insufficient pre-war planning for an assault on the Prussian naval installations, and concluded that it would only be possible with Danish assistance, which was not forthcoming. The four ships, under the command of Vizeadmiral (Vice Admiral) Eduard von Jachmann, made an offensive sortie in early August 1870 out to the Dogger Bank, though they encountered no French warships. Friedrich Carl and the other two broadside ironclads thereafter suffered from chronic engine trouble, which left Arminius alone to conduct operations. Friedrich Carl, Kronprinz, and König Wilhelm stood off the island of Wangerooge for the majority of the conflict, while Arminius was stationed in the mouth of the Elbe river. On 11 September, the three broadside ironclads were again ready for action; they joined Arminius for another major operation into the North Sea. It too did not encounter French opposition, as the French Navy had by this time returned to France.

Through the 1870s, the German armored fleet typically saw active service during the summer months. Over the winter, most of the vessels were placed in reserve with one or two kept in a state of reduced commission as guard ships. In June 1871, the screw corvette Nymphe was in Brazil while on an overseas cruise; some of her crew had been arrested following a fistfight in the country. The Germans threatened to deploy Kronprinz, three more corvettes, and two gunboats, which convinced the Brazilian government to release the crewmen. Beginning in September 1872, Friedrich Carl embarked on a world cruise with the screw frigate Elisabeth and the gunboat Albatross. They were joined by Elisabeth's sister ships Vineta and Gazelle while cruising through the Caribbean Sea.

=== Deployment to Spain ===
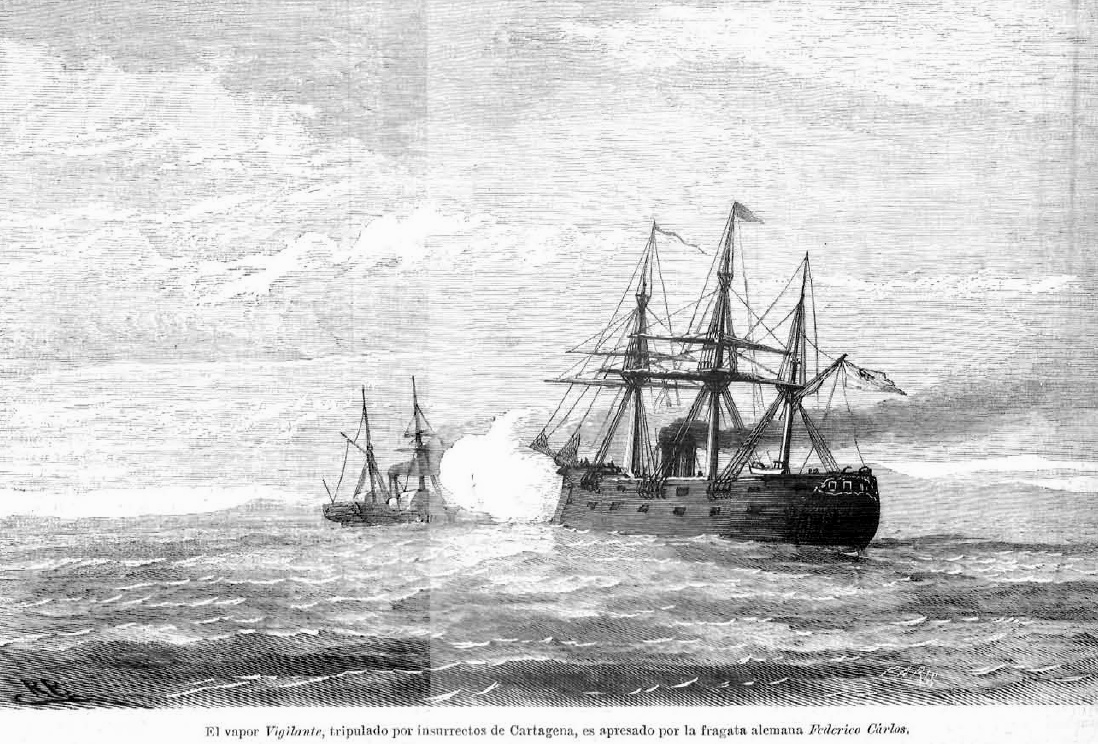
Illustration of the action between Friedrich Carl and the rebel steamer Vigilante

In early 1873, the First Spanish Republic was beset with the Cantonal Revolution. Friedrich Carl, under the command of Vizeadmiral Reinhold Werner, steamed to Spanish waters along with a pair of unarmored vessels. The ships joined a British squadron that had been patrolling the southern Spanish coast. A rebel faction of the Spanish Navy had seized four of the country's seven ironclads. Werner, the senior commander in the group, was given command of the Anglo-German force. The squadron blockaded two rebel ironclads in the port of Cartagena after they had bombarded a coastal town. While steaming off Alicante, Friedrich Carl encountered the rebel armed steamer Vigilante, seized the vessel, and returned it to the national government.

Friedrich Carl and the British ironclad HMS Swiftsure attacked two of the rebel ships—Vitoria and Almansa—without authorization from London or Berlin. The rebel vessels had attempted to extort the port of Almería. In the brief engagement, the Anglo-German force overwhelmed the rebels and seized both ships, which were subsequently turned over to the Spanish government. The rebels considered declaring war on Germany over the affair, but eventually decided against it. A captured rebel leader was briefly held on board Friedrich Carl. Werner's blockade eventually forced the rebels to surrender, after which Friedrich Carl returned to Germany. Chancellor Otto von Bismarck ordered a court-martial for Werner, whose actions Bismarck considered to be excessive. Bismarck prohibited the Imperial Navy from conducting "gunboat diplomacy" in the future.

=== Later service ===
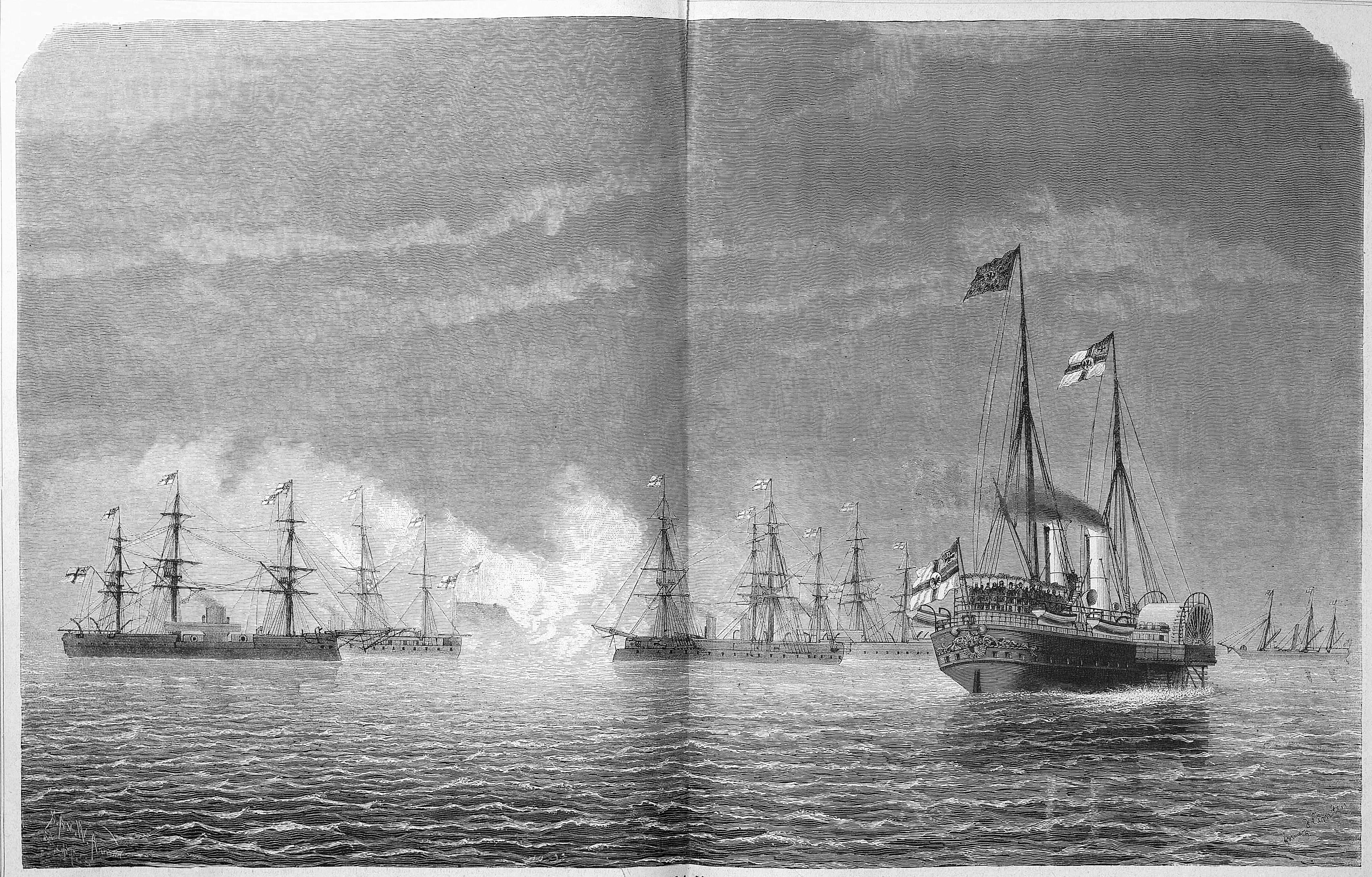
Illustration of the fleet conducting maneuvers, including Friedrich Carl and several other ironclads and other vessels

In 1876, the ironclad squadron—Kronprinz, Friedrich Carl, and the new ironclads Kaiser and Deutschland—were sent to the Mediterranean Sea in response to the murder of the German consul in Salonika in the Ottoman Empire. The German ships were joined by French, Russian, Italian, and Austro-Hungarian warships in an international demonstration condemning the murder. The Germans returned home in August and, after arriving in September, were laid up for the winter. The squadron went to the Mediterranean again in 1877, though this time it included Friedrich Carl, Kaiser, Deutschland, and the turret ship Preussen, along with the aviso Falke. During the cruise, the ships visited various ports in the Aegean Sea and along the Levant. Friedrich Carl remained laid up for the 1878 training cruise that saw the loss of the brand-new ironclad Grosser Kurfürst in an accidental collision with Kaiser. She returned to service in May 1879, serving as the flagship of the training squadron, which also included Kronprinz, Preussen, and Friedrich der Grosse. The ship remained in service through 1883; later that year, the training cycle concluded with a large-scale simulated attack on Kiel, with Friedrich Carl and the other ironclads acting as an "eastern" opponent. The defenders, led by the corvettes Luise and Blücher, were judged to have been victorious. The armored fleet operated entirely under steam power that year, the first time it did so.

In 1885, Friedrich Carl had torpedo nets installed; these remained on the ship until 1897. During the 1885 refit, she also received new boilers and a modified funnel that had a second uptake installed. The battery of six 37 mm Hotchkiss guns and five torpedo tubes were also fitted during this modernization. The ship took part in the 1885 maneuvers with the armored corvettes Bayern and Hansa. In 1887, she was present for the ceremonies marking the beginning of construction of the Kaiser Wilhelm Canal, which was to link the Kiel with the North Sea. On 22 December 1890, she ran aground on a rock at Mitylene, Lesbos, Greece. In 1895, the ship was disarmed; she was placed into service as a torpedo test ship on 11 August of that year. She served in this capacity until 21 January 1902, when she was renamed Neptun and used as a harbor ship. Her name was then freed to be reused on the new armored cruiser Friedrich Carl, which was launched on 22 June 1902. Neptun was used for experiments with a new apparatus designed by Georg Leue to transfer coal from a collier to another vessel while at sea. These were deemed successful, though subsequent tests involving the armored cruiser Prinz Heinrich proved to be a disappointment, and no further development was carried out. The ship was formally stricken from the naval register on 22 June 1905 and sold to a Dutch ship-breaking firm in March 1906 for 284,000 gold marks. The ship was then towed to the Netherlands and broken up for scrap.
