= SMS Kronprinz (1867) =

Armored frigate of the German Imperial Navy

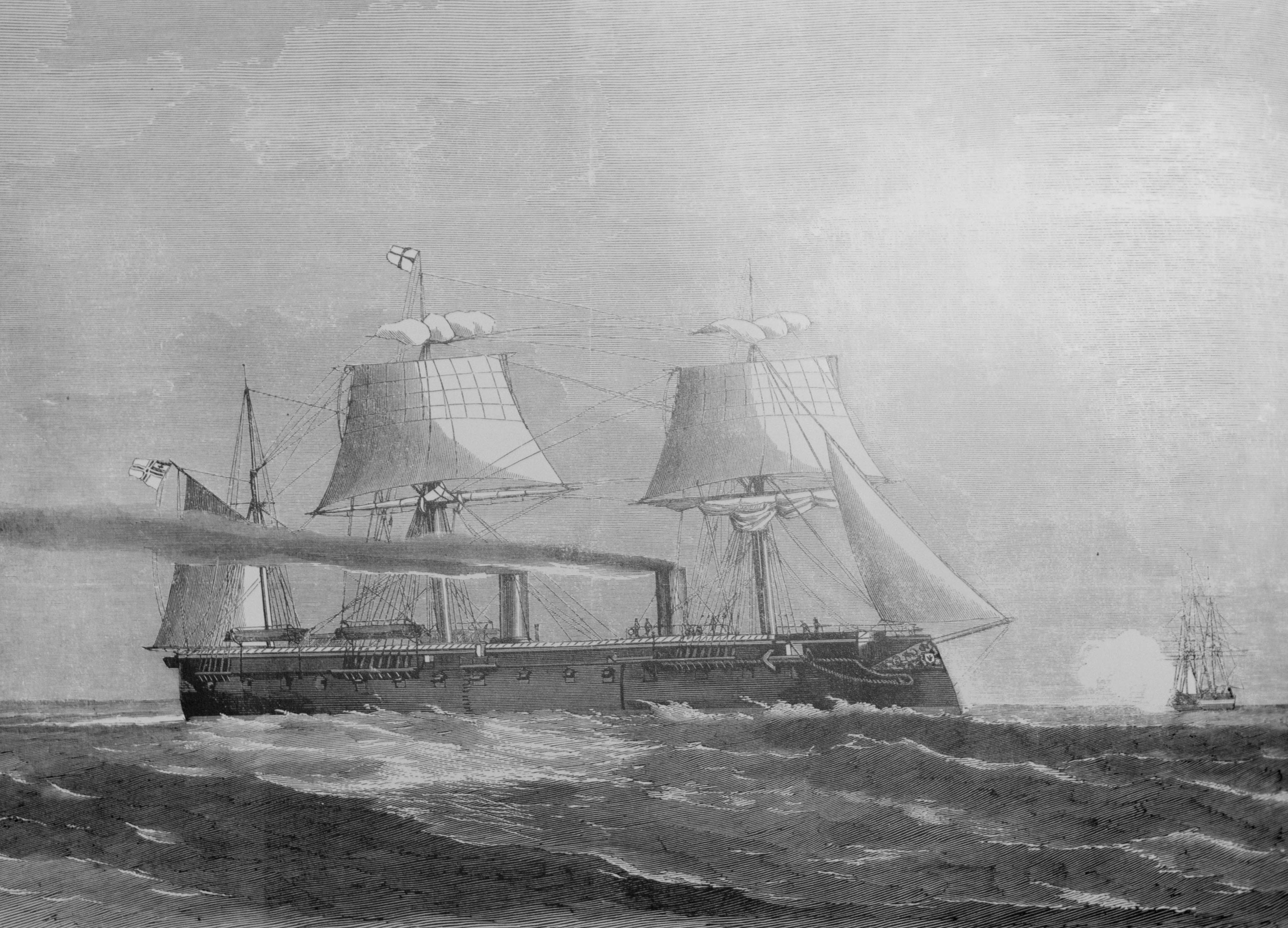
- Illustration of Kronprinz in 1868

Class overview
- Operators: Prussian Navy; Imperial German Navy
- Preceded by: Friedrich Carl
- Succeeded by: König Wilhelm

History

Prussia, later German Empire
- Name: Kronprinz
- Builder: Samuda Brothers, London
- Laid down: February 1866
- Launched: 6 May 1867
- Commissioned: 19 September 1867
- Decommissioned: 4 October 1892
- Fate: Scrapped in 1921

General characteristics
- Type: Armored frigate
- Displacement: Design: 5,767 t (5,676 long tons); Full load: 6,760 t (6,650 long tons)
- Length: 89.44 m (293 ft 5 in)
- Beam: 15.20 m (49 ft 10 in)
- Draft: 7.85 m (25 ft 9 in)
- Installed power: 8 × boilers; 4,500 PS (4,400 ihp)
- Propulsion: 1 × single-expansion steam engine; 1 × screw propeller
- Sail plan: Barque-rigged
- Speed: 13.5 knots (25.0 km/h; 15.5 mph)
- Range: 3,200 nmi (5,900 km; 3,700 mi) at 10 knots (19 km/h; 12 mph)
- Complement: 33 officers; 508 enlisted
- Armament: 2 × 21 cm (8.3 in) L/22 guns; 14 × 21 cm (8.3 in) L/19 guns
- Armor: Belt: 76 to 124 mm (3.0 to 4.9 in)

SMS Kronprinz (Note: "SMS" stands for "Seiner Majestät Schiff", or "His Majesty's Ship".) was a unique German ironclad warship built for the Prussian Navy in 1866–1867. Kronprinz was laid down in 1866 at the Samuda Brothers shipyard at Cubitt Town in London. She was launched in May 1867 and commissioned into the Prussian Navy that September. The ship was the fourth ironclad ordered by the Prussian Navy, after Arminius, Prinz Adalbert, and Friedrich Carl, though she entered service before Friedrich Carl. Kronprinz was built as an armored frigate, armed with a main battery of sixteen 21 cm (8.3 in) guns; several smaller guns were added later in her career.

Kronprinz saw limited duty during the Franco-Prussian War of 1870–1871. Engine troubles aboard the ship, along with the two other armored frigates in her squadron, prevented operations against the French blockade. Only two sorties in which Kronprinz participated were conducted, both of which did not result in combat. The ship served in the subsequent Imperial Navy until she was converted into a training ship for boiler room personnel in 1901. The ship was ultimately broken up for scrap in 1921.

== Design ==
Following the acquisition of the small ironclad warships Arminius and Prinz Adalbert, which were only usable in coastal areas, the Prussian Navy sought to acquire armored vessels capable of operations on the high seas. The purpose of the new ships would be primarily directed against Prussia's primary naval rival, Denmark, which in the recent Second Schleswig War had imposed a blockade of German ports that Prussia had not been able to break. Ironclads were at that time a recent development and the only option for sea-going warships was the armored frigate, modeled on traditional sailing ships with a battery on the broadside. The navy requested approval from the Landtag (Parliament) in 1865 for an expanded budget to acquire the needed vessels, but the parliament refused, prompting King Wilhelm I to circumvent the legislature with a decree on 4 July authorizing the purchase of two armored frigates.

At that time, Britain and France had the shipbuilders most experienced with the type, so the navy decided to order one vessel from each country. The contract for Kronprinz was placed on 13 January 1866, four days after that for Friedrich Carl, from Britain and France respectively. The British-built Kronprinz was modeled on the Defence and Hector classes. The British naval architect Edward Reed designed the ship, and resulted in a vessel similar to Friedrich Carl.

=== General characteristics and propulsion ===
Kronprinz was 88.20 meters (289 ft 4 in) long at the waterline and 89.44 m (293 ft 5 in) long overall. She had a beam of 15.20 m (49 ft 10 in) and a draft of 7.85 m (25 ft 9 in) forward and 7.45 m (24 ft 5 in) aft. The ship was designed to displace 5,767 metric tons (5,676 long tons) at a normal loading, and up to 6,760 t (6,650 long tons) at full load. The ship's hull was constructed with transverse and longitudinal iron frames. It contained nine watertight compartments and a double bottom that ran for 43 percent of the length of the vessel. The ship was an excellent sea boat; the ship was responsive to commands from the helm but had a large turning radius. Steering was controlled with a single rudder. The ship's crew numbered 33 officers and 508 enlisted men. Kronprinz carried a number of smaller boats, including a large tender, two launches, a pinnace, two cutters, two yawls, and one dinghy.

The ship's propulsion system was built by John Penn and Sons of Greenwich, England. A horizontal, two-cylinder single-expansion steam engine powered the ship. It drove a two-bladed screw 6.5 m (21 ft 4 in) in diameter. Eight trunk boilers, with four fireboxes in each, were divided into two boiler rooms. Each room was vented into its own funnel, which could be retracted while the ship was under sail. The boilers supplied steam to the engine at 2 standard atmospheres (200 kPa). The propulsion system was rated at 4,500 metric horsepower (4,400 ihp) and a top speed of 13.5 knots (25.0 km/h; 15.5 mph), though on trials Kronprinz managed to make 4,870 PS (4,800 ihp) and 14.7 knots (27.2 km/h; 16.9 mph). The ship carried up to 646 t (636 long tons) of coal, which enabled a maximum range of 3,200 nautical miles (5,900 km; 3,700 mi) at a cruising speed of 10 knots (19 km/h; 12 mph) and a range of 1,730 nmi (3,200 km; 1,990 mi) at 14 knots. A three-masted barque rig with a surface area of 1,980 square meters supplemented the steam engine.

=== Armament and armor ===
As built, Kronprinz was equipped with a main battery of thirty-two rifled 72-pounder cannon. After her delivery to Germany, these guns were replaced with a pair of 21 cm (8.3 in) L/22 guns and fourteen 21 cm RK L/19 guns. The L/22 gun could depress to −5 degrees and elevate to 13 degrees, which provided a range of 5,900 m (6,500 yd). The shorter barreled L/19 guns had a wider range of elevation, from −8 to 14.5 degrees, but the shorter barrel imposed a lower muzzle velocity, which correspondingly reduced the range of the gun to 5,200 m (5,700 yd). The two types of gun fired the same shell, of which the total supply numbered 1,656 rounds of ammunition. The fourteen L/19 guns were placed in a central battery amidships, seven on either broadside. The L/22 weapons were placed on the upper deck on the centerline on either end of the ship as chase guns.

Later in her career, six 3.7 cm (1.5 in) Hotchkiss revolver cannon in individual mounts were installed, along with five 35 cm (13.8 in) torpedo tubes. Two of the tubes were placed in the bow, one on each broadside, and one in the stern on the port side. All were placed above water, and were supplied with a total of 12 torpedoes.

Kronprinz's armor consisted of wrought iron backed with heavy teak planking. The iron component of the waterline armored belt ranged in thickness from 76 mm (3 in) in the stern to 124 mm (4.9 in) amidships and 114 mm (4.5 in) toward the bow. The entire belt was backed with 254 mm (10 in) of teak. Above the belt was a strake of iron plate that ranged in thickness from 114 to 121 mm (4.5 to 4.8 in) on 254 mm of timber, which protected the broadside battery. The battery's roof was protected by 9-millimeter-thick (0.35 in) iron plating, intended to deflect shots that passed over the side of the ship or fragments from explosions.

== Service history ==
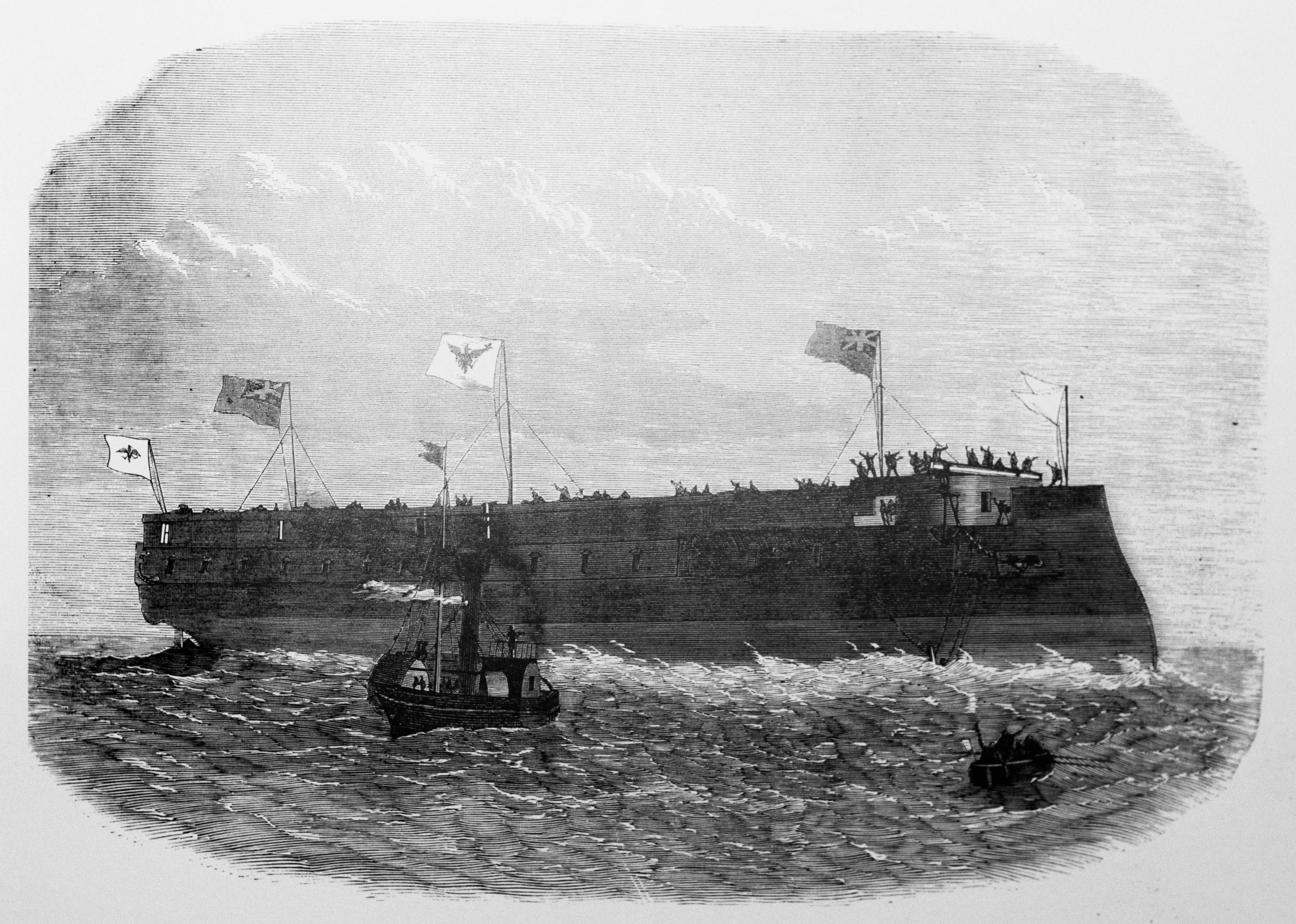
Sketch depicting Kronprinz after her launching in 1867, before fitting out

The order for the new ship was placed on 13 January 1866, and the keel for Kronprinz was laid down in late February at the Samuda Brothers shipyard in London. King Wilhelm decided on the name Kronprinz on 10 January 1867. In May, a delegation that included the Prussian ambassador to Britain, Albrecht von Bernstorff, and Kapitän zur See (KzS—Captain at Sea) Ludwig von Henk arrived to witness the ship's launching ceremony, which was held on 6 May. Samuda began sea trials on 6 August, which were supervised by representatives from the Prussian Naval Ministry, which included Henk. He became the ship's first commander on 19 September, when the ship was transferred to Prussian control and commissioned into the fleet. Crews for Friedrich Carl and Kronprinz were carried to the ships by the screw frigate Hertha and the screw corvette Medusa. The men from Hertha did not arrive in Portsmouth, Britain, after which the ship began another round of trials.

Kronprinz departed Britain on 24 October, and on the voyage from England to Prussia, the ship lost her main mast in a storm. The ship immediately went into dock for refitting upon arrival in Kiel on 28 October; the mast was repaired and the ship's armament was converted from the initial arrangement. She conducted further testing from 1 November, during which Prince Adalbert supervised portions of the trials. The ship was decommissioned again on 16 November. As with Friedrich Carl, the completion of the ship was delayed significantly by problems with the new Prussian guns. The weapons originally intended for the ships used Kreiner breech blocks that had proved to be prone to failure during a series of tests in 1867–1868. Krupp-designed guns were substituted, but Krupp had difficulty delivering the guns (and their carriages) in a timely manner, delaying her recommissioning until 11 May 1869. First, she returned to Britain to be dry-docked and have her hull cleaned of marine biofouling. She thereafter joined the newly created Ironclad Training Squadron for a period of exercises held from 30 August to 10 September in the Kieler Förde. At that time, the unit also included Friedrich Carl and König Wilhelm. Kronprinz was then decommissioned at Kiel-Ellerbek on 25 September.

Kronprinz was recommissioned on 30 April 1870 to take part in the normal peacetime training routine with the Ironclad Training Squadron. Through the 1870s, the German armored fleet typically saw active service during the summer months. Over the winter, most of the vessels were placed in reserve with one or two kept in a state of reduced commission as guard ships. In May 1870, the three ships were joined by Prinz Adalbert for a visit to Britain, though Friedrich Carl was damaged after running aground in the Great Belt. Kronprinz and the gunboat Cyclop had to tow Friedrich Carl back to Kiel for repairs, but damage to Friedrich Carl's screws required her to be taken to Britain, since Prussian facilities could not perform the necessary work. The ships arrived on 2 June, after which Kronprinz left to join the rest of the squadron at Plymouth, Britain. Kronprinz, König Wilhelm, and Prinz Adalbert continued on to Plymouth while Friedrich Carl returned to Kiel for repairs. The latter vessel quickly rejoined the ships there and on 1 July they departed for a training cruise to Fayal in the Azores, Portugal. But as tensions with France over the Hohenzollern candidacy for the vacant Spanish throne. While they cruised east through the English Channel, they learned of the increasing likelihood of war, and the Prussians detached Prinz Adalbert to Dartmouth to be kept informed of events. The rest of the squadron joined her there on 13 July, and as war seemed to be imminent, the Prussians ended the cruise and returned home. Kronprinz had to take Prinz Adalbert under tow for the voyage due to the latter's slow speed.

=== Franco-Prussian War ===
The ships arrived back in Wilhelmshaven on 16 July, three days before France declared war on Prussia over the Ems Dispatch, initiating the Franco-Prussian War. The greatly numerically inferior Prussian Navy assumed a defensive posture against a naval blockade imposed by the French Navy. Kronprinz, Friedrich Carl, and König Wilhelm were concentrated in the North Sea at the port of Wilhelmshaven, with a view toward breaking the French blockade of the port. They were subsequently joined there by the turret ship Arminius, which had been stationed in Kiel. For the duration of the conflict, Kronprinz was commanded by Captain Reinhold von Werner. Despite the great French naval superiority, the French had conducted insufficient pre-war planning for an assault on the Prussian naval installations, and concluded that it would only be possible with Danish assistance, which was not forthcoming.

The four ships, under the command of Vizeadmiral (Vice Admiral) Eduard von Jachmann, made an offensive sortie in early August 1870 out to the Dogger Bank, though they encountered no French warships. Kronprinz and the other two broadside ironclads thereafter suffered from chronic engine trouble, which left Arminius alone to conduct operations. Kronprinz, Friedrich Carl, and König Wilhelm stood off the island of Wangerooge for the majority of the conflict, while Arminius was stationed in the mouth of the Elbe river. On 11 September, the three broadside ironclads were again ready for action; they joined Arminius for another major operation into the North Sea. It too did not encounter French opposition, as the French Navy had by this time returned to France. Kronprinz was drydocked in Wilhelmshaven in mid-December for an overhaul that included cleaning her hull and repairing her propulsion system. In mid-January 1871, Werner began planning an operation for Kronprinz to raid the port of Cherbourg. He envisioned bombarding the coastal fortifications, sinking any ships in the harbor, and destroying port facilities. But the French soon began negotiations to end the war, leading to the naval command cancelling the attack. The French signed the armistice that ended the war on 28 January.

=== 1871–1877 ===
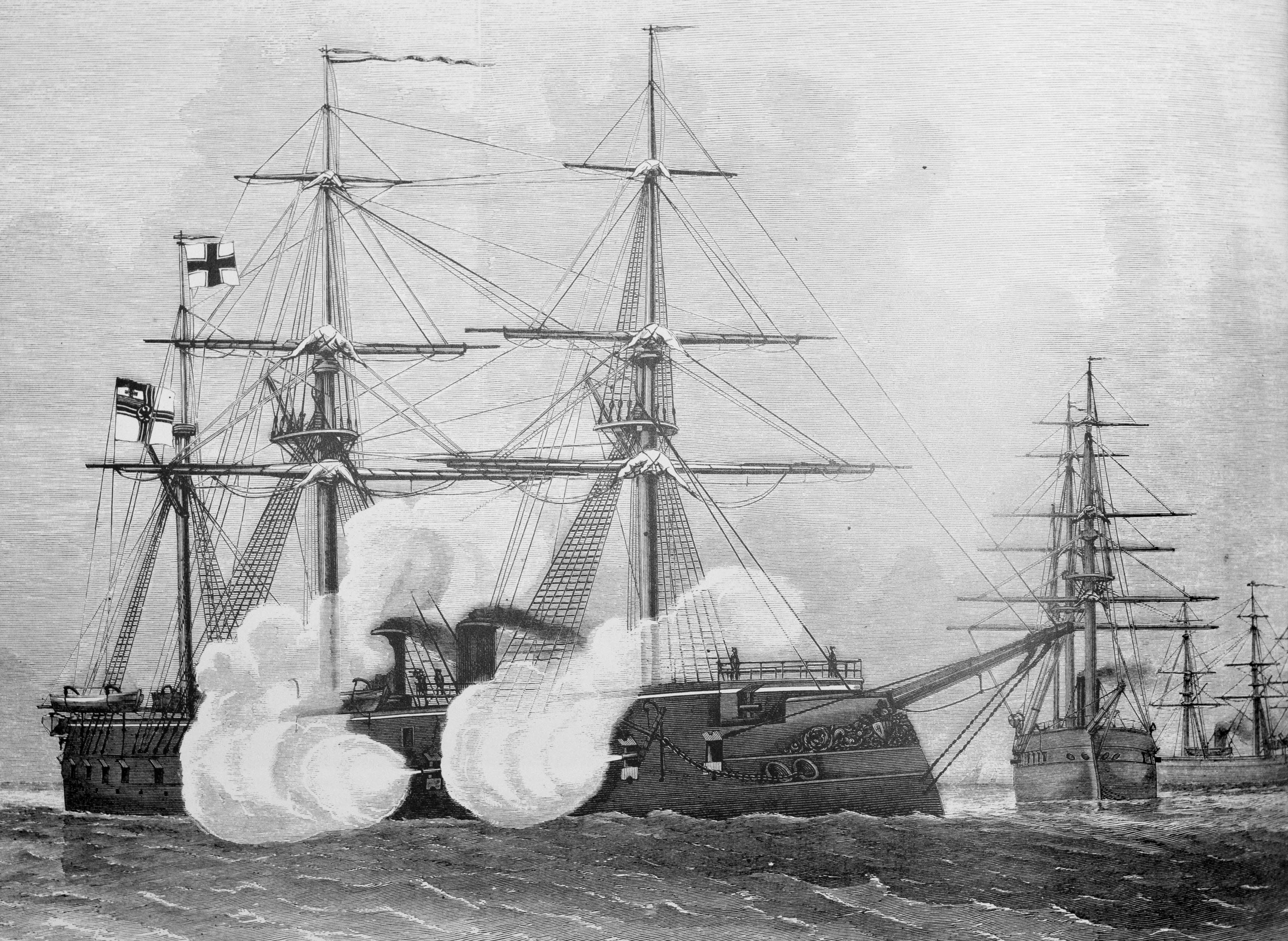
Kronprinz on maneuvers with Friedrich Carl and Ariadne

With the war over, Kronprinz sailed to Glückstadt on the Elbe to help oversee the repatriation of some 20,000 French prisoners of war. After that, she went to Kiel on 30 April, continuing on to Danzig, where she took the artillery training ship Thetis under tow to bring her back to Kiel. Kronprinz towed a floating dry dock from Swinemünde to Kiel in June 1871, with assistance from Cyclop and the paddle steamer Preussischer Adler. In September, Kronprinz was decommissioned for the winter. In October, the screw corvette Nymphe was in Brazil while on an overseas cruise; some of her crew had been arrested following a fistfight in the country. The Germans threatened to deploy Kronprinz, Friedrich Carl, three more corvettes, and two gunboats, which convinced the Brazilian government to release the crewmen. Kronprinz, which had been recommissioned on 18 December, was decommissioned again on 22 January 1872.

Kronprinz was reactivated in 1872, but she did not go to sea that year, and her crew largely remained ashore. She was laid up in 1873 until 19 November, when she was briefly recommissioned for the possibility of being sent to strengthen the German squadron operating off the coast of Spain during the Cantonal rebellion, but she was not deployed there. She returned to the Ironclad Training Squadron on 19 May 1874, this year serving as the squadron flagship. The unit that year included Friedrich Carl, the screw corvette Ariadne, and the gunboat Albatross. She flew the flag of now-Konteradmiral (Rear Admiral) Henk that year. The ships conducted individual training in May before concentrating in the Baltic Sea on 6 June for squadron maneuvers. The ships then embarked on a cruise to Britain that included a stop in the Isle of Wight, where Crown Prince Frederick and his wife, Victoria, were visiting. The squadron then departed for the Atlantic for maneuvers that were intended to test the ships' capabilities on the open ocean. The ships returned to Germany on 29 July, where the aviso Grille replaced Albatross. Further training exercises followed in the Baltic in August, after which Kronprinz was decommissioned in Wilhelmshaven.

Kronprinz was recommissioned on 19 May 1875 for another stint in the Ironclad Training Squadron; KzS Paul Grapow served as the ship's captain at that time. For the year's summer training cruise, Kronprinz and König Wilhelm were joined by the recently built ironclads Kaiser and Hansa, though the ships remained in German waters. That year, flagship duties passed back to König Wilhelm. The only event of note that year occurred on 25 July: while the squadron was moored in Swinemünde, Grapow died of a heart attack aboard Kronprinz. The next year, the ironclad squadron—Kronprinz, Friedrich Carl, Kaiser, and the new Deutschland—were sent to the Mediterranean Sea in response to the murder of the German consul in Salonika in the Ottoman Empire. The German ships were joined by French, Russian, Italian, and Austro-Hungarian warships in an international demonstration condemning the murder. The German squadron, with the exception of Kronprinz, returned home in August, where it was dissolved on the 23rd. In September, they were laid up for the winter, but Kronprinz remained in the Mediterranean the rest of the year, ultimately departing for Germany on 20 December. The ship arrived off the Jade Bay on 28 January 1877, but she encountered a severe storm and was not able to enter the bay. Large waves caused significant flooding, and her jibboom was broken off. She was finally able to enter the Jade on 1 February, where she docked at Wilhelmshaven. Repairs were completed by late 1877, causing her to miss the year's training exercises.

=== 1878–1921 ===
Kronprinz in Kiel in 1892

Kronprinz remained laid up for the 1878 training cruise that saw the loss of the brand-new ironclad Grosser Kurfürst in an accidental collision with Kaiser. She returned to service the following year when the squadron was reactivated in May; Friedrich Carl served as the flagship and the squadron also included the ironclads Preussen and Friedrich der Grosse. The ships visited Norway on the cruise. Kronprinz was again left in reserve for 1880, but she was recommissioned in 1881 to replace the new armored corvette Sachsen, which was suffering from unreliable engines. Once again, the ships remained in German waters. In May that year, Kronprinz towed the barracks ship Elbe from Wilhelmshaven to Kiel. The next two years followed the same pattern. Engine problems plagued the ship throughout her career; Kronprinz's engines broke down during the fleet maneuvers in May 1883. Two of the three other armored frigates also broke down, which forced the cancellation of the maneuvers. Later that year, the training cycle concluded with a large-scale simulated attack on Kiel, with Kronprinz and the other ironclads acting as an "eastern" opponent. The defenders, led by the corvettes Luise and Blücher, were judged to have been victorious. The armored fleet operated entirely under steam power that year, the first time it did so.

Kronprinz was docked for modernization in late 1883; she received new boilers and the six Hotchkiss revolver cannon and six torpedo tubes were installed. Her rigging was also reduced at that time. By 1884, the four Sachsen-class ironclads had entered service, and they formed the training squadron that year. Kronprinz had anti-torpedo nets installed in 1885; these were later removed in 1897. In 1887, she was present for the ceremonies marking the beginning of construction of the Kaiser Wilhelm Canal, which was to link the Kiel with the North Sea. She remained out of regular servie until 1 October 1891, when she was recommissioned to join the Training Squadron for its first winter training cruise, which went to Scotland and Norway. She remained in commission for the 1892 training year, which concluded with large scale fleet maneuvers in September. On 4 October, she was decommissioned for the last time and placed in reserve.

Kaiser Wilhelm II ordered the navy to modernize Kronprinz and Friedrich Carl and then sell the vessels to Qing China in 1894, with the proceeds to be used to build new cruisers for the German fleet. The plan was blocked by the First Sino-Japanese War, since Germany could not sell weapons to a belligerent state, which would have required a vote in the Reichstag. Wilhelm II suggested buying the vessels himself and then selling them to China to avoid the constitutional restraints on the transfer, but the shipyard that had been proposed to do the work—Germaniawerft—pointed out that even after reconstructing the 25-year-old ships, they would be far too slow even for the backwards Chinese fleet. Japan inquired about buying ships in Germany later in 1894, and they refused to consider the old ironclads for the same reason. The ship ultimately remained in reserve until 22 August 1901, when she was stricken from the naval register. Kronprinz was reconstructed at the Kaiserliche Werft (Imperial Dockyard) in Kiel that year. The propulsion system was overhauled and the eight J Penn & Sons boilers were removed. Two Dürr and two Thornycroft boilers were installed in their place. Her barque rig was cut down to 1,409 square meters (15,170 sq ft). After emerging from the reconstruction, Kronprinz served as a training ship for engine-room personnel, based in Kiel. The ship was ultimately sold to Bonn, a German ship-breaking firm, on 3 October 1921 for 5,000,000 marks. Kronprinz was broken up for scrap in Rendsburg-Audorf later that year.
