= SMS König Wilhelm =

Armored frigate of the German Imperial Navy

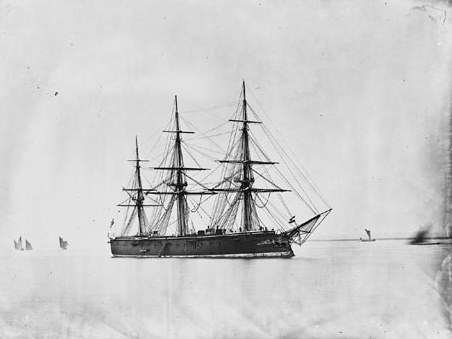
- König Wilhelm in Gravesend, England

Class overview
- Operators: Prussian Navy; Imperial German Navy
- Preceded by: Kronprinz
- Succeeded by: Hansa

History

Prussia; Germany
- Name: SMS König Wilhelm
- Namesake: Wilhelm I, King of Prussia
- Builder: Thames Iron Works, Leamouth, London
- Laid down: 1865
- Launched: 25 April 1868
- Commissioned: 20 February 1869
- Stricken: 4 January 1921
- Fate: Broken up, 1921

General characteristics
- Type: Armored frigate
- Displacement: Design: 9,757 t (9,603 long tons); Full load: 10,761 t (10,591 long tons)
- Length: 112.2 m (368 ft 1 in)
- Beam: 18.3 m (60 ft)
- Draft: 8.56 m (28 ft 1 in)
- Installed power: 8 × boilers; 8,000 PS (7,900 ihp)
- Propulsion: 1 × single-expansion steam engine; 1 × screw propeller
- Sail plan: 2,600 m^{2} (28,000 sq ft)
- Speed: 14 knots (26 km/h; 16 mph)
- Range: 1,300 nmi (2,400 km; 1,500 mi) at 10 knots (19 km/h; 12 mph)
- Crew: 36 officers; 694 enlisted men
- Armament: 19 × 24 cm K L/20 guns; 4 × 21 cm (8.3 in) guns
- Armor: Belt: 152 to 305 mm (6 to 12 in); Battery: 150 mm (5.9 in)

SMS König Wilhelm (Note: "SMS" stands for "Seiner Majestät Schiff", or "His Majesty's Ship".) (King William) was an armored frigate of the Prussian and later the German Imperial Navy. The ship was laid down in 1865 at the Thames Ironworks shipyard in London, originally under the name Fatih for the Ottoman Empire. She was purchased by Prussia in February 1867, launched in April 1868, and commissioned into the Prussian Navy in February 1869. The ship was the fifth ironclad ordered by the Prussian Navy, after Arminius, Prinz Adalbert, Friedrich Carl, and Kronprinz. She was built as an armored frigate, armed with a main battery of sixteen 24 cm (9.4 in) and five 21 cm (8.3 in) guns; several smaller guns and torpedo tubes were added later in her career.

The ship was for a time the largest and most powerful warship in the German navy; she served as its flagship during the Franco-Prussian War in 1870–1871, though engine troubles prevented the ship from seeing action. In 1878, the ship accidentally rammed and sank the ironclad Grosser Kurfürst, with great loss of life. König Wilhelm was converted into an armored cruiser in 1895–1896; by early 1904, however, she had been superseded by newer vessels. In May of that year, she was placed out of active service and used as a floating barracks and training ship, a role she held through World War I. In 1921, the ship was ultimately broken up for scrap, after a career spanning 52 years and three German states.

== Design ==
The ship had originally been ordered by the Ottoman Empire under the name Fatih from the Thames Ironworks shipyard in London, England in 1865. The vessel was built to a design created by the British naval architect Edward Reed, and at the time it was regarded in the press to be the most powerful vessel in the world. Some 1,800 metric tons (1,800 long tons) larger than the contemporary British ironclad HMS Hercules, she also carried a larger gun battery. But owing to the Ottoman inability to pay for the vessel, the builder placed the still-incomplete vessel for sale the following year. The Kingdom of Prussia had embarked on a program to acquire sea-going ironclad warships, and after having placed orders for two such vessels in British and French shipyards in 1865, opted to add Fatih to the Prussian Navy when the opportunity arose. The small Prussian fleet had been unable to defeat the Danish naval blockade in the Second Schleswig War of 1863–1864, and sought to strengthen its fleet with ironclads to prevent future blockades.

On entering service, the ship was the largest and most powerful vessel in the Prussian fleet, and served as its flagship. (Note: König Wilhelm was armed with 23 large-caliber guns; earlier ships, such as Friedrich Carl and Kronprinz, were armed with 16 guns, and later vessels, such as the Preussen and Kaiser classes, were armed with four and eight heavy guns, respectively. See Gröner, pp. 2–6.) Indeed, König Wilhelm remained the largest German vessel until 1891. This was in part due to the fact that Germany laid down only one small ironclad between 1876 and 1888; the four Brandenburg-class battleships, launched in 1891 and 1892, were the first ships to surpass König Wilhelm in size.

=== General characteristics and machinery ===
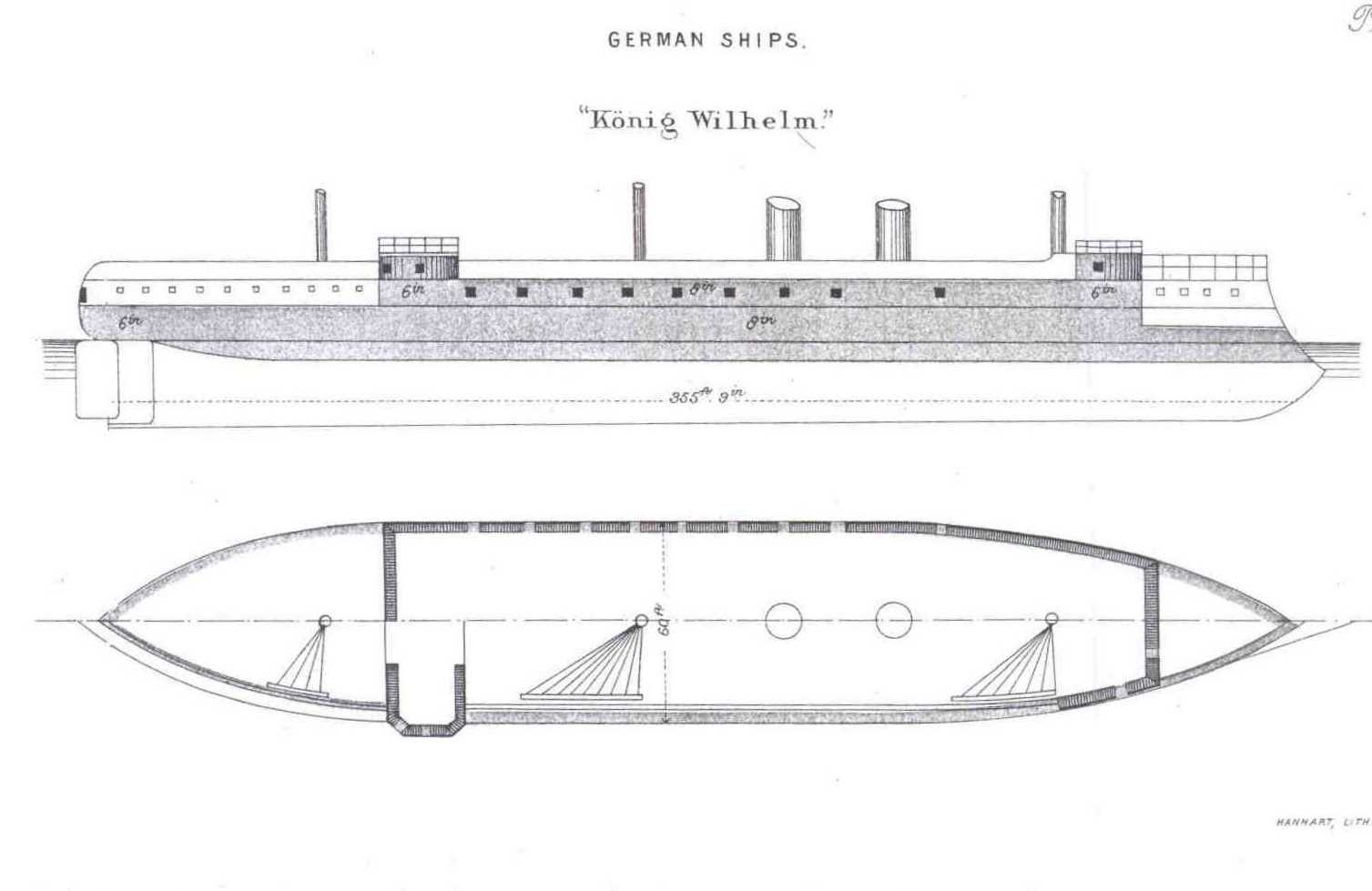
Plan and profile drawing of SMS König Wilhelm

König Wilhelm was 108.6 meters (356 ft 4 in) long at the waterline and 112.2 m (368 ft 1 in) long overall. She had a beam of 18.3 m (60 ft) and a draft of 8.56 m (28 ft 1 in) forward and 8.12 m (26 ft 8 in) aft. The ship was designed to displace 9,757 metric tons (9,603 long tons) at a normal loading, and up to 10,761 t (10,591 long tons) at full load. The ship's hull was constructed with transverse and longitudinal iron frames. It contained eleven watertight compartments and a double bottom that ran for 70 percent of the length of the vessel.

König Wilhelm was noted by the German navy as having had "satisfactory sea-keeping qualities"; the ship was responsive to commands from the helm and had a moderate turning radius. Steering was controlled with a single rudder. She suffered from severe roll but little pitch. The ship's crew numbered 36 officers and 694 enlisted men, and while serving as a flagship, the crew was augmented with a command staff composed of 9 officers and 47 enlisted men. König Wilhelm carried a number of smaller boats, including two picket boats, two launches, a pinnace, two cutters, two yawls, and one dinghy.

A horizontal, two-cylinder single-expansion steam engine, built by Maudslay, Son & Field of London, powered the ship. It drove a four-bladed screw propeller that was 7 m (23 ft) in diameter. J Penn & Sons of Greenwich built eight tank boilers for the ship. These were divided into two boiler rooms with twenty fireboxes in each, supplied steam to the engine at 2 standard atmospheres (200 kPa). Each boiler room was vented into its own funnel.

The propulsion system was rated at 8,000 metric horsepower (7,900 ihp) and a top speed of 14 knots (26 km/h; 16 mph), though on trials König Wilhelm exceeded both figures, reaching 8,440 metric horsepower (8,320 ihp) and 14.7 knots (27.2 km/h; 16.9 mph). The ship carried 750 t (740 long tons) of coal, which enabled a maximum range of 1,300 nautical miles (2,400 km; 1,500 mi) at a cruising speed of 10 knots (19 km/h; 12 mph). A ship rig with a surface area of 2,600 square meters (28,000 sq ft) supplemented the steam engine, though in service they added little to the ship's performance.

=== Armament and armor ===
As built, König Wilhelm was equipped with a main battery of thirty-three rifled 72-pounder cannon. After her delivery to Germany, these guns were replaced with nineteen 24 cm K L/20 guns, supplied with a total of 1,440 rounds of ammunition. Most of these guns were mounted in a central battery, with nine on either broadside. The nineteenth gun was a Chase gun placed in the stern, in the commandant's quarters. The guns could depress to −4° and elevate to 7.5°; at maximum elevation, the guns could reach targets out to 4,500 m (14,800 ft). The ship's armament was rounded out by four 21 cm (8.3 in) guns, which could depress to −5° and elevate to 13°. Their maximum range was 5,900 m (19,400 ft). The 21 cm guns were on the upper deck. Two were in the half-round towers near the stern, and two others were mounted near the bow as chase guns.

As built, the ship was protected by wrought iron plating mounted over teak backing. Protection at the waterline was thickest amidships, with an upper belt of iron armor 305 mm (12 in) thick, a lower belt of 178 mm (7 in) thick iron, and 250 mm (9.8 in) of teak behind the iron. The upper belt was reduced to 152 mm (6 in) in the stern but did not extend to the bow. The lower belt was 127 mm (5 in) thick in both the bow and stern, and the teak backing was 90 mm (3.5 in) for both ends of the ship. The central battery was protected with 203 mm (8 in) and 150 mm (5.9 in) thick plating amidships and on the bow and stern respectively and capped on either end with 150 mm thick transverse bulkheads.

=== Modifications ===
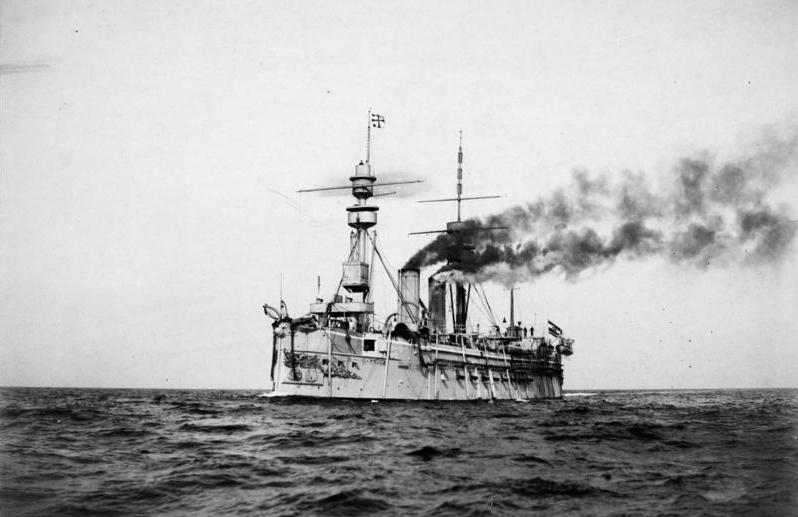
König Wilhelm after the 1895–1896 reconstruction into an armored cruiser

König Wilhelm received a number of modifications over the course of her long career. While under repair in the early 1880s, she received new boilers, and a new stem that removed her ram bow. An additional strake of belt armor that was 305 mm thick was added above the main belt. An armored conning tower was erected atop the old aft bridge. The sides of the conning tower were 50 to 100 mm (2.0 to 3.9 in) thick sloped plates, and they were capped with a 30 mm (1.2 in) thick roof. Her sailing rig was cut down, leaving just the masts and topmasts and only a few yards for signalling purposes. This amounted to a fairly significant weight savings, which was used for the installation of anti-torpedo nets and three torpedo tubes. Two of the latter were placed in the bow, firing forward, and the third was located in the stern.

König Wilhelm was reconstructed in the early 1890s with the hope of modernizing the old ironclad. Her armament was revised to twenty-two 24 cm L/20 guns, a single 15 cm (5.9 in) L/30 gun with 109 rounds mounted in the stern, and eighteen 8.8 cm (3.5 in) quick-firing guns on the upper deck, nine on each broadside. The 15 cm gun had a range of 8,900 m (29,200 ft). Two more 35 cm (14 in) torpedo tubes were also installed, one on both broadsides. In total, her five torpedo tubes were supplied with a total of 13 rounds. During her reconstruction into an armored cruiser, the iron armor was cut away and replaced with stronger steel armor. She received electric lighting and a central heating system. Her original masts were replaced with heavy military masts, each with two fighting tops for some of the light guns. The work was completed in October 1892.

More work was done in 1895–1896, which saw the incorporation of lessons from the recent First Sino-Japanese War: her wooden decks were replaced with steel and linoleum to reduce the risk of fire, as were her interior wooden bulkheads and stairs. A second armored conning tower was installed in place of her old fore bridge, and electrical hoists for her guns were added. After returning to service in 1896, she was redesignated as an armored cruiser.

Following her conversion into a training ship in 1907, most of her armament was removed. The ship only carried sixteen 8.8 cm L/30 guns, and in 1915, twelve of these were removed.

== Service history ==
The ship was laid down in 1865 and the Prussians purchased her on 6 February 1867, initially renaming her Wilhelm I. They changed her name again to König Wilhelm on 14 December, and she was launched on 25 April 1868. After completing fitting-out, she was commissioned less than a year later, on 20 February 1869. The ship's first commander was Kapitän zur See Ludwig von Henk. Shortly after entering service, she joined the ironclads Friedrich Carl and Kronprinz for training exercises in August and September.

=== Franco-Prussian War ===
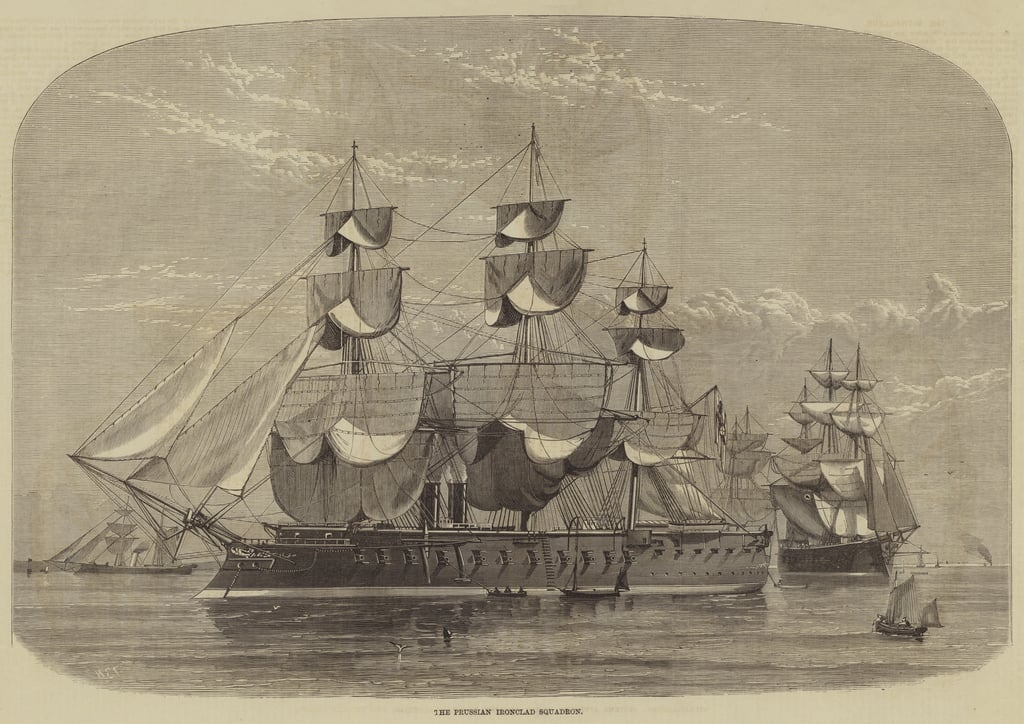
The Prussian ironclad squadron in 1870 at Plymouth, Illustrated Times

In May 1870, König Wilhelm, Kronprinz, and Friedrich Carl were joined by the ironclad ram Prinz Adalbert for a visit to Britain, though Friedrich Carl was damaged after running aground in the Great Belt. König Wilhelm, Kronprinz, and Prinz Adalbert continued on to Plymouth while Friedrich Carl returned to Kiel for repairs. The latter vessel quickly rejoined the ships there and on 1 July they departed for a training cruise to Fayal in the Azores, Portugal. But tensions with France over the Hohenzollern candidacy for the vacant Spanish throne were reaching a crisis point. While they cruised east through the English Channel, they learned of the increasing likelihood of war, and the Prussians detached Prinz Adalbert to Dartmouth to be kept informed of events. The rest of the squadron joined her there on 13 July, and as war seemed to be imminent, the Prussians ended the cruise and returned to home.

The ships arrived back in Wilhelmshaven on 16 July, three days before France declared war on Prussia over the Ems Dispatch, initiating the Franco-Prussian War. The greatly numerically inferior Prussian Navy assumed a defensive posture against a naval blockade imposed by the French Navy. Kronprinz, Friedrich Carl, and König Wilhelm were concentrated in the North Sea at the port of Wilhelmshaven, with a view toward breaking the French blockade of the port. They were subsequently joined there by the turret ship Arminius, which had been stationed in Kiel. Despite the great French naval superiority, the French had conducted insufficient pre-war planning for an assault on the Prussian naval installations, and concluded that it would only be possible with Danish assistance, which was not forthcoming.

The four ships, under the command of Vizeadmiral (Vice Admiral) Eduard von Jachmann, made an offensive sortie in early August 1870 out to the Dogger Bank, though they encountered no French warships. König Wilhelm and the other two broadside ironclads thereafter suffered from chronic engine trouble, which left Arminius alone to conduct operations. König Wilhelm, Friedrich Carl, and Kronprinz stood off the island of Wangerooge for the majority of the conflict, while Arminius was stationed in the mouth of the Elbe river. On 11 September, the three broadside ironclads were again ready for action; they joined Arminius for another major operation into the North Sea. It too did not encounter French opposition, as the French Navy had by this time returned to France.

=== Peacetime operations in the 1870s ===
After the war, the Prussian Navy became the Imperial Navy, and resumed its peacetime training routines. General Albrecht von Stosch became the chief of the Imperial Navy, and organized the fleet for coastal defense. Through the early 1870s, König Wilhelm and the other armored frigates operated intermittently, alternating between periods of training activity and stints in reserve. Typically, the ships were commissioned for summer training cycles before being laid up over the winter, with one or two ironclads kept in commission but with reduced crews to serve as guard ships. For the 1875 training year, König Wilhelm cruised with Kronprinz and the recently completed ironclads Hansa and Kaiser, though they stayed in local waters. König Wilhelm remained laid up through 1876 and 1877.

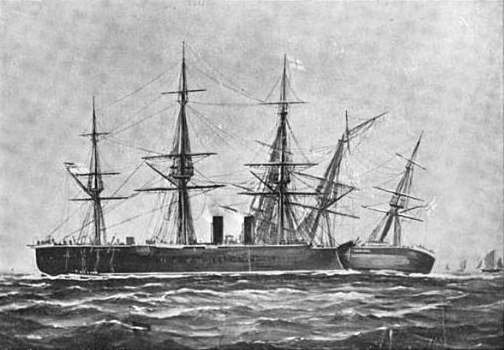
König Wilhelm collides with Grosser Kurfürst

König Wilhelm was recommissioned in early 1878 to take part in that year's training program. While steaming in the Straits of Dover on 31 May, König Wilhelm accidentally collided with the newly commissioned turret ironclad Grosser Kurfürst. The two ships, along with Preussen, had left Wilhelmshaven on the 29th. König Wilhelm and Preussen steamed in a line, with Grosser Kurfürst off to starboard. On the morning of the 31st, the three ships encountered a pair of sailing vessels off Folkestone. Grosser Kurfürst turned to port to avoid the boats while König Wilhelm sought to pass the two boats, but there was not enough distance between her and Grosser Kurfürst. She therefore turned hard to port to avoid Grosser Kurfürst, but the action was not taken quickly enough, and König Wilhelm found herself pointed directly at Grosser Kurfürst. König Wilhelm's ram bow tore a hole in Grosser Kurfürst.

A failure to adequately seal the watertight bulkheads aboard Grosser Kurfürst caused the ship to sink rapidly, in the span of about eight minutes. Out of a crew of 500 men, 269 died in the accident. König Wilhelm was also badly damaged in the collision, with severe flooding forward. König Wilhelm's captain initially planned on beaching the ship to prevent it from sinking, but determined that the ship's pumps could hold the flooding to an acceptable level. The ship made for Portsmouth, where temporary repairs could be effected to allow the ship to return to Germany. On the voyage back to Germany, she collided with the British smack Tom off Norderney. Tom lost her bowsprit, topmast and mizzen mast. She was escorted in to Great Yarmouth by the smack Glance.

In the aftermath of the collision with Grosser Kurfürst, the German navy held a court martial for Rear Admiral Batsch, the squadron commander, and Captains Monts and Kuehne, the commanders of the two ships, along with Lieutenant Clausa, the first officer aboard Grosser Kurfürst, to investigate the sinking. The damage to König Wilhelm necessitated a lengthy period of repairs from 1878 to 1882. The work was carried out at the Imperial Dockyard in Wilhelmshaven, and also included reboilering and replacement of the ship's ram. Her 21 cm guns were replaced with 24 cm guns, providing the ship with a uniform gun battery.

=== Later service ===
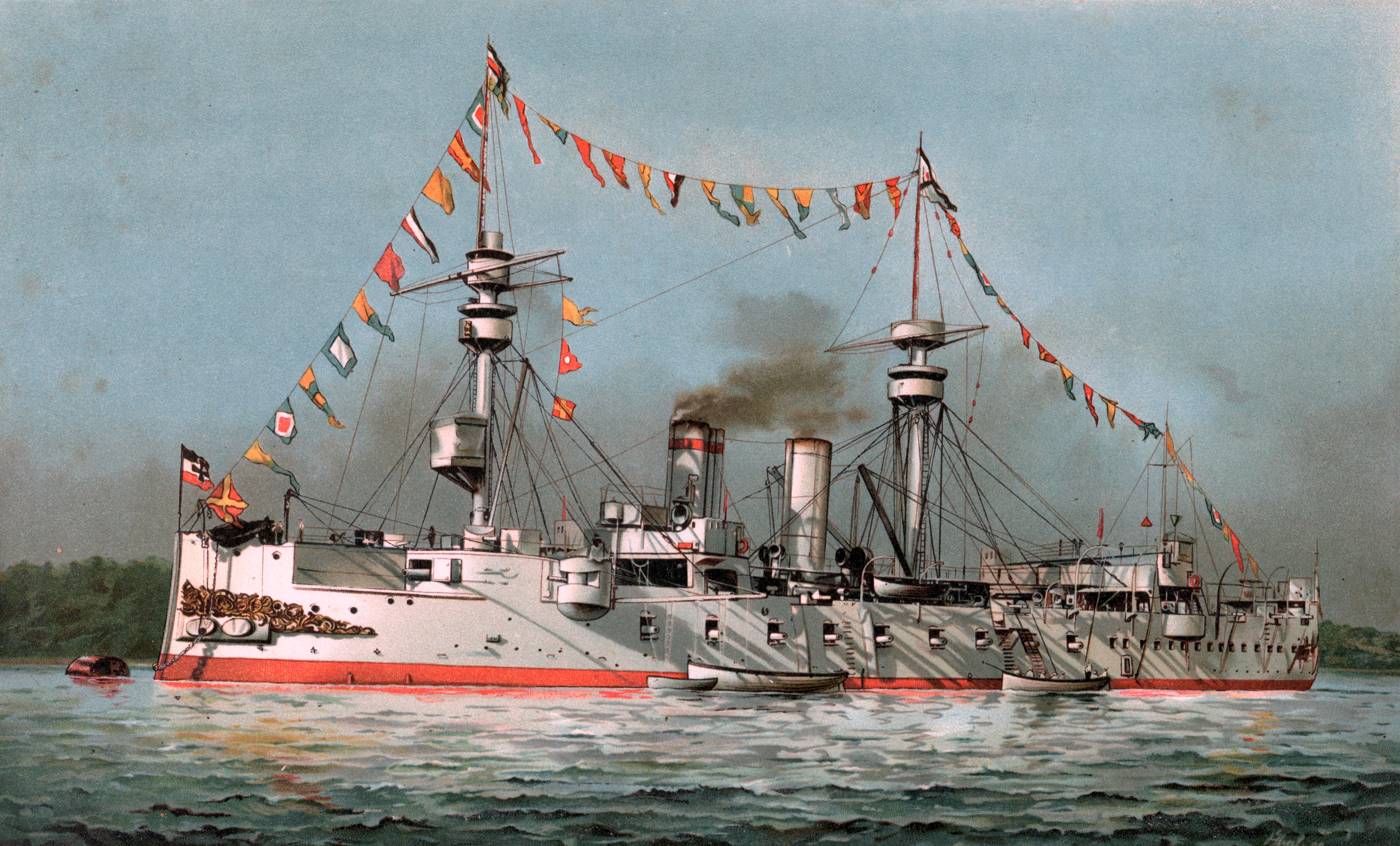
König Wilhelm as a training ship

Torpedo nets were fitted to the ship from 1885 to 1897. König Wilhelm returned to service in 1887 to participate in the ceremonies marking the beginning of construction of the Kaiser Wilhelm Canal, which was to link Kiel with the North Sea. She remained in commission for the summer training exercises, serving with I Division of the fleet. The ship participated in the 1888 training cycle as well, along with Kaiser and the ironclads Bayern and Württemberg. She did not see activity from 1889 to late 1892, but she was reactivated to take part in the training cruise of the winter of 1892–1893.

By 1893, König Wilhelm had been assigned as the flagship for II Division of the German fleet; the four Sachsen-class armored corvettes composed I Division. The ship flew the flag of Admiral Otto von Diederichs, and was based in Wilhelmshaven. On 20 February 1894, a special ceremony was held on board the ship to commemorate the 25th anniversary of her commissioning. Kaiser Wilhelm II attended the ceremony, as did Ludwig von Henk, who had by that time retired as a Vizeadmiral. In April 1894, II Division conducted a training cruise to prepare for the annual summer maneuvers. During the cruise, König Wilhelm ran aground on a mud bank off the Frisian coast. Deutschland and Friedrich der Grosse quickly pulled the ship free with minimal damage. The ships then proceeded to Scotland via Oslo and Bergen. The division returned to Kiel at the end of May to replenish its stocks of coal and provisions for the summer exercises. During the 1894 maneuvers, von Diederich's II Division acted as the opposing force in the Baltic, simulating a Russian fleet attacking Germany's Baltic coast. Following the conclusion of maneuvers in September, Diederichs left the squadron and was replaced by Admiral Karl Barandon.

In 1895, König Wilhelm went into drydock at the Blohm and Voss shipyard in Hamburg for an extensive reconstruction into an armored cruiser. The vessel's armament was increased, the ship rig was removed, and new fighting masts were installed in place of the old masts. The ship's crew was dramatically increased, to 38 officers and 1,120 enlisted men. Work lasted through 1896, and the ship was returned to the fleet in her new guise on 25 January 1897. On 26 June, she represented Germany at the Fleet Review for Queen Victoria's Diamond Jubilee. She served with the fleet until 1904, when she was removed from active duty. Starting on 3 May 1904, she became a harbor ship. She was then used as barracks ship and training vessel for naval cadets, based in Kiel, starting on 1 October 1907. Two years later, König Wilhelm was moved to the Naval Academy at Mürwik, where she continued in these duties. Starting in 1910, the old corvette Charlotte served as a support vessel for the ship. The light cruiser Medusa replaced Charlotte as König Wilhelm's auxiliary vessel in 1917. König Wilhelm served through World War I, until 1921, after Germany's defeat. On 4 January 1921, the ship was stricken from the naval register and broken up for scrap in Rönnebeck.
