= Ludwig von Henk =

German naval officer (1820–1894)

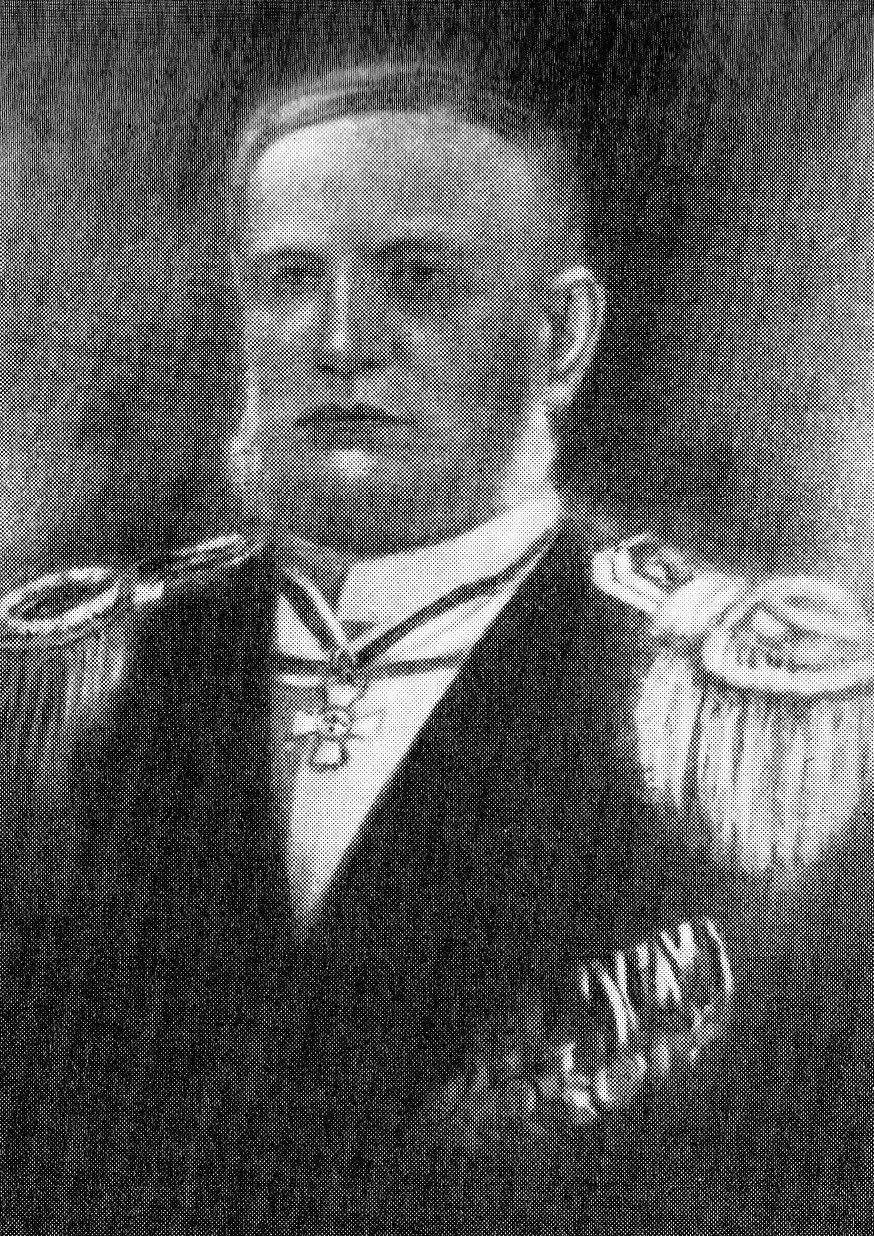
- Born: Ludwig Henk; 4 March 1820; Anklam
- Died: 17 October 1894 (aged 74); Berlin
- Burial place: Columbiadamm Cemetery, Berlin; 52°28′53″N 13°24′34″E
- Military career
- Allegiance: Prussia; German Empire
- Branch: Prussian Navy; Imperial German Navy
- Service years: 1849–1879
- Rank: Vizeadmiral
- Commands: Commander of Marinestation der Nordsee

Ludwig von Henk (4 March 1820, Anklam – 17 October 1894) was a German naval officer, who distinguished himself in the Prussian Navy and later in the Imperial German Navy of the German Empire. He retired as a Vice-Admiral.

== Naval career ==
Henk was born in Anklam, Province of Pomerania. He began his career in merchant ships, making journeys to Brazil, the Mediterranean, and the Black Sea. In 1844, he was promoted to captain. After the establishment of the Prussian Navy in 1849, he entered as an auxiliary officer, becoming a Kapitänleutnant (KL—Captain Lieutenant) in 1855 and a Korvettenkapitän (Corvette Captain) in 1859. From August to October 1858, he commanded the aviso Grille.

In 1861 he went to Berlin as the head of the Hydrographic Bureau in the Prussian War Ministry. In 1865, he became captain of the steam corvette SMS Nymphe, which was sent to the Mediterranean.

During the Austro-Prussian War of 1866, Henk was commander of the Prussian North Sea Fleet.

Over the winter of 1866–1867, Henk commanded the steam frigate Gazelle on a cruise to the Mediterranean, in company with the gunboat Blitz. Gazelle struck a merchant ship in Constantinople in February 1867; Henk had been asleep at the time of the collision and the investigation placed the blame for it on his executive officer, KL Johannes Weickhmann. The Admiralty recalled Gazelle in April due to the damage sustained in the accident.

In 1867 was promoted to the rank of Kapitän zur See (Captain at Sea).

During the Franco-Prussian War of 1870–1871, he commanded the armored frigate König Wilhelm, part of the North Sea squadron commanded by Konteradmiral (Rear Admiral) Eduard von Jachmann. The Prussian fleet sortied only twice to attack the French blockade fleet in the North Sea, in early August and 11 September 1870, but on both occasions the fleet failed to locate any French vessels. For much of the war, König Wilhelm struggled with machinery problems that left her confined to port.

After war's end became commander of the Marinestation der Nordsee (North Sea naval station).

In 1871, he was promoted to flag rank as Konteradmiral and was ordered to Berlin as Director of the Admiralty the following year, where he served as the deputy to Albrecht von Stosch, the chief of the Admiralty. Henk was chosen in large part to reduce the threat to the position of Stosch, a general of the Prussian Army with no naval experience. Henk was an officer of middle-class background, had initially served in the merchant marine before entering the navy, and though he had been exonerated by the investigation into the Gazelle collision, it nevertheless had damaged his reputation. Later in 1872, the idea for establishing a permanent "flying squadron" of cruising warships to respond to crises around the world was raised, but Henk rejected it on the grounds that it was excessively expensive; Stosch sided with Henk and the proposal came to nothing. For the majority of his tenure as Director of the Admiralty, Henk was restricted to technical matters after 1874 in a move by Stosch to further limit the challenge Henk might pose to him. As a result, he had authority only on matters of ship building, ordnance, and supply.

He remained there until July 1879.

During this time he was promoted further (1877) to Vizeadmiral (Vice Admiral), and the following year was raised to the hereditary peerage. He retired in 1879 and was given a pension.

Between 1890 and 1893, Henk served in the Reichstag as a member of the German Conservative Party, representing the electoral district of Ueckermünde-Wollin. He died in Berlin.
