= SMS Deutschland (1874) =

Armored frigate of the German Imperial Navy

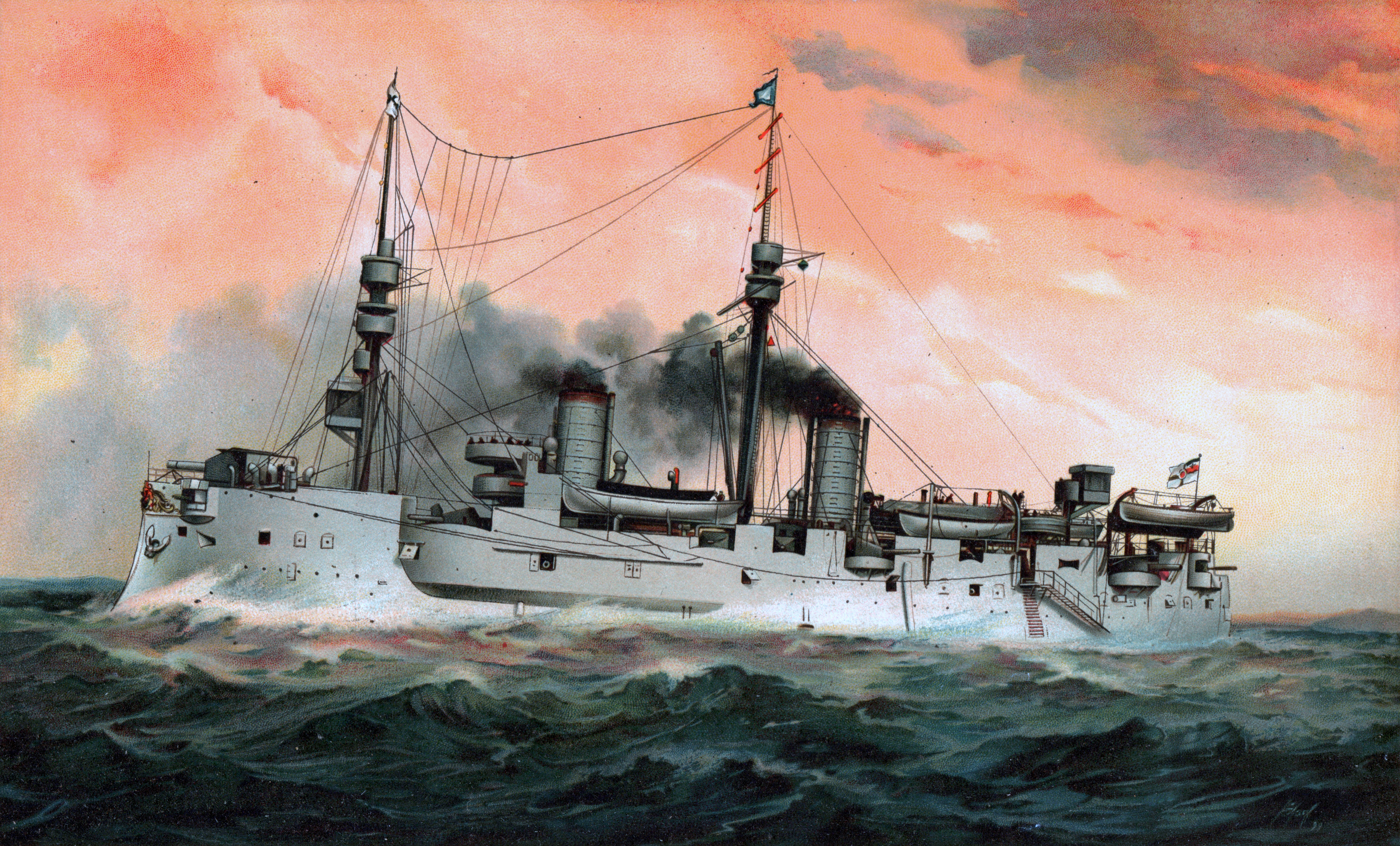
- Deutschland in 1902

History

German Empire
- Name: SMS Deutschland
- Namesake: Deutschland (Germany)
- Builder: Samuda Brothers, Great Britain
- Laid down: 1872
- Launched: 12 September 1874
- Commissioned: 20 July 1875
- Renamed: Jupiter, 22 November 1904
- Reclassified: Hulk
- Fate: Scrapped at Hamburg, 1909

General characteristics
- Class & type: Kaiser-class ironclad
- Displacement: Design: 7,645 t (7,524 long tons); Full load: 8,940 t (8,800 long tons)
- Length: 89.34 m (293 ft 1 in)
- Beam: 19.1 m (62 ft 8 in)
- Draft: 7.39 m (24 ft 3 in)
- Installed power: 8 × boilers; 5,779 metric horsepower (5,700 ihp)
- Propulsion: 1 × single-expansion steam engine; 1 × screw propeller
- Speed: 14.6 knots (27.0 km/h; 16.8 mph)
- Range: 3,200 nmi (5,900 km; 3,700 mi) at 10 knots (19 km/h; 12 mph)
- Complement: 32 officers; 568 enlisted men
- Armament: 8 × 26 cm (10.2 in) guns; 1 × 21 cm (8.3 in) gun
- Armor: Belt: 127 to 254 mm (5 to 10 in); Deck: 38 to 51 mm (1.5 to 2.0 in); Battery: 203 mm (8 in)

SMS Deutschland (Note: "SMS" stands for "Seiner Majestät Schiff", or "His Majesty's Ship".) was the second and final ship of the Kaiser-class ironclads; SMS Kaiser was her sister ship. Named for Germany (Deutschland in German), the ship was laid down in the Samuda Brothers shipyard in London in 1872. The ship was launched in September 1874 and commissioned into the German fleet in July 1875. Deutschland mounted a main battery of eight 26 cm (10.2 in) guns in a central battery amidships. She was the last capital ship built for the German Navy by a foreign ship-builder; all subsequent ships were built in Germany.

Deutschland served with the fleet from her commissioning until 1896, though she was frequently placed in reserve throughout her career. The ship was a regular participant in the annual fleet training maneuvers conducted with the exception of the mid-1880s, when she was temporarily replaced by newer vessels. She participated in several cruises in the Baltic and Mediterranean, often escorting Kaiser Wilhelm II on official state visits. Deutschland was rebuilt in the early 1890s as an armored cruiser, though she was too slow to perform satisfactorily in this role. Nevertheless, she spent three years in the East Asia Squadron before returning to Germany in 1900. She was used in secondary roles after 1904, until 1908 when she was sold and broken up for scrap.

== Design ==
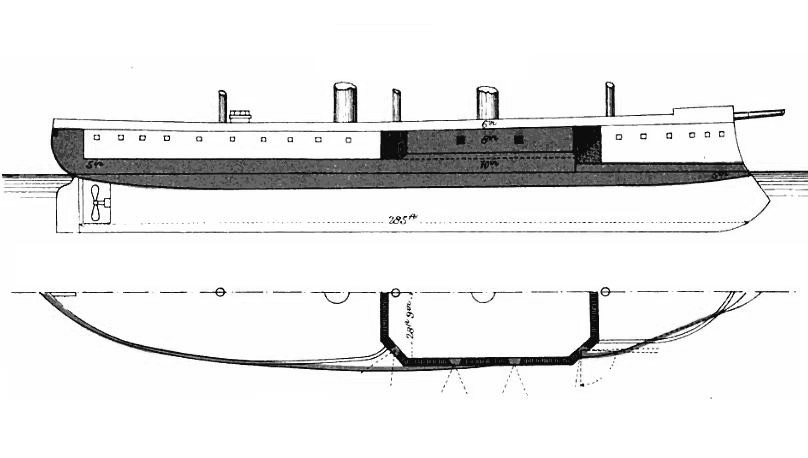
Plan and profile drawing of SMS Deutschland

The two Kaiser-class ironclads were authorized under the naval program of 1867, which had been approved by the Reichstag (Imperial Diet) to strengthen the North German Federal Navy in the wake of the Second Schleswig War, when the weak, then-Prussian Navy had been unable to break the blockade imposed by the Danish Navy. Designed by Edward James Reed in 1869, the ships were among the most powerful casemate ships built by any navy, though they were rendered obsolescent by the time they were completed by the advent of the turret ship.

Deutschland was 89.34 meters (293.1 ft) long overall and had a beam of 19.1 m (63 ft) and a draft of 7.39 m (24.2 ft) forward. She displaced 7,645 t (7,524 long tons) normally and up to 8,940 t (8,800 long tons) at full load. Deutschland was powered by one 2-cylinder single-expansion steam engine, which was supplied with steam by eight coal-fired trunk boilers. The boilers were vented into two widely spaced funnels. The propulsion system was rated at 14.6 knots (27.0 km/h; 16.8 mph) from 5,779 metric horsepower (5,700 ihp). She was also equipped with a full ship rig to supplement the steam engines. Her standard complement consisted of 32 officers and 568 enlisted men.

She was armed with a main battery of eight 26 cm RK L/20 (10.2 in) guns mounted in a central casemate located amidships. Two guns fired directly to each broadside, two fired in limited arcs ahead and to the side, and the remaining pair could engage targets in an astern arc. As built, the ship was also equipped with a single 21 cm (8.3 in) L/22 chase gun.

Deutschland's armor consisted of wrought iron; her armor belt was 127 to 254 mm (5 to 10 in) thick, above which a strake of armor that was 203 mm (8 in) thick protected the main battery guns in the casemate.

=== Modifications ===
Deutschland was heavily rebuilt into an armored cruiser between 1894 and 1897. She received a secondary battery of eight 15 cm (5.9 in) L/35 guns, one of which was placed on the forecastle, one on the stern, and the remainder on the upper deck, three per broadside. She also had eight 8.8 cm (3.5 in) L/30 guns installed, six of which were on the upper deck and the other pair in the bow. Four 3.7 mm (0.15 in) auto-cannon were added for defense against torpedo boats. She also received five 35 cm (13.8 in) torpedo tubes, all mounted in the ship's hull below the waterline.

She had an armor deck that was 38 to 51 mm (1.5 to 2.0 in) thick installed, and several watertight bulkheads were installed to improve the ship's resistance to flooding. Her entire rigging equipment was removed and two heavy military masts were installed in place of the fore and main masts. Her mizzenmast was replaced by a light pole mast for signalling purposes.

== Service history ==
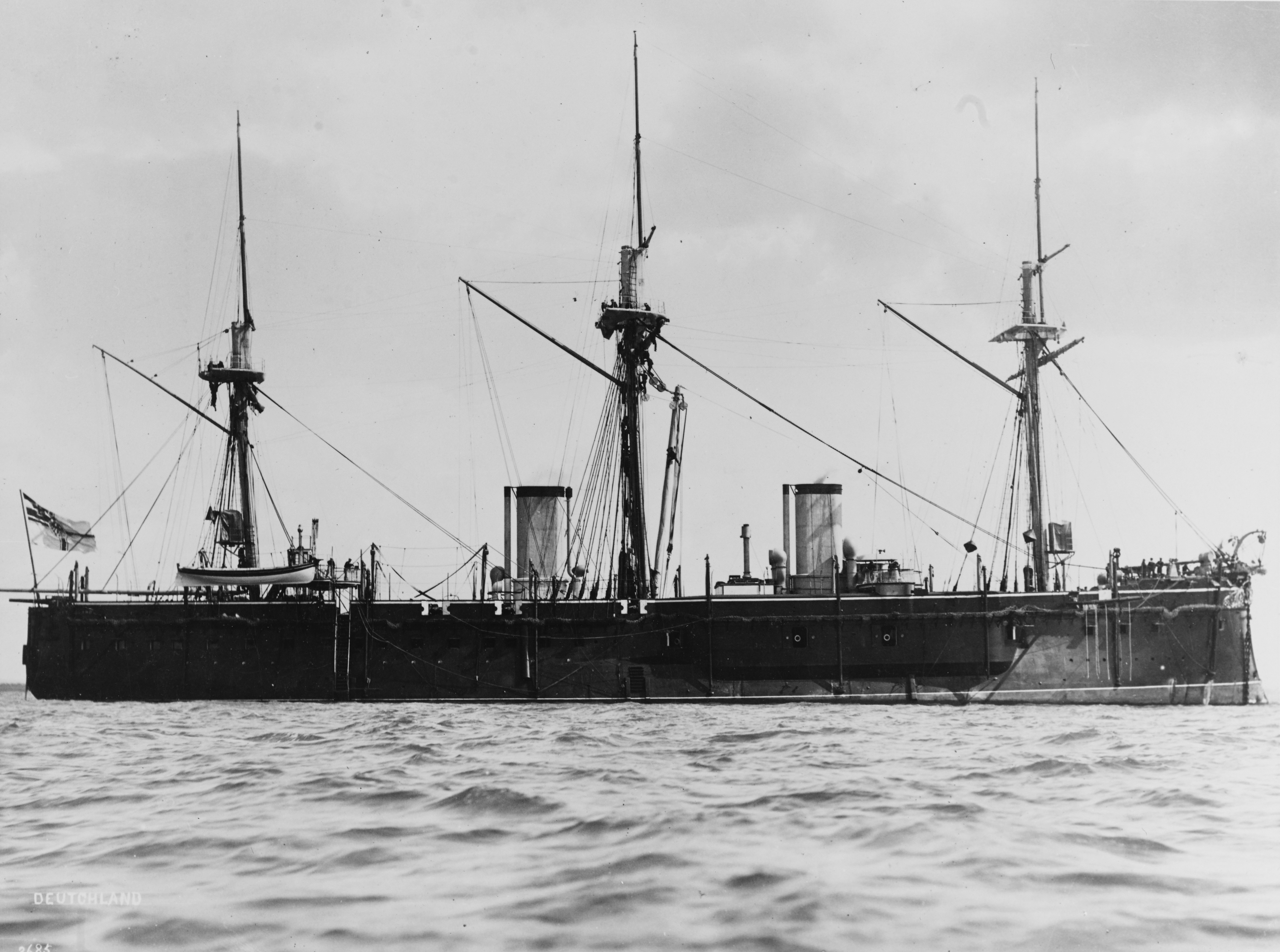
Deutschland in her original configuration

Deutschland was ordered by the Imperial Navy from the Samuda Brothers shipyard in London, UK; her keel was laid in 1872. Deutschland and her sister Kaiser were ordered shortly after the end of the Franco-Prussian War, under the assumption that the French would quickly attempt a war of revenge. The ship was launched on 12 September 1874 and commissioned into the German fleet on 20 July 1875. She was the last German capital ship built by a foreign shipbuilder.

Following her commissioning in July 1875, a German crew sailed Deutschland to Germany. She arrived too late, however, to participate in the annual summer training maneuvers. The ship was ready for the 1876 maneuvers; the squadron consisted of Deutschland, her sister Kaiser, and the older ironclads Friedrich Carl and Kronprinz, commanded by Rear Admiral Carl Ferdinand Batsch. At around the time Batch's squadron was working up for the summer cruise, the German consul in Salonika, then in the Ottoman Empire, was murdered. Further attacks on German citizens living in the area were feared, and so Batsch was ordered to sail to the Mediterranean Sea to stage a naval demonstration in June 1876. After arriving with the four ironclads, he was reinforced by three unarmored vessels. After the threat of violence subsided in August, Batsch departed with Kaiser and Deutschland; the other two ironclads remained in the Mediterranean for the rest of the summer.

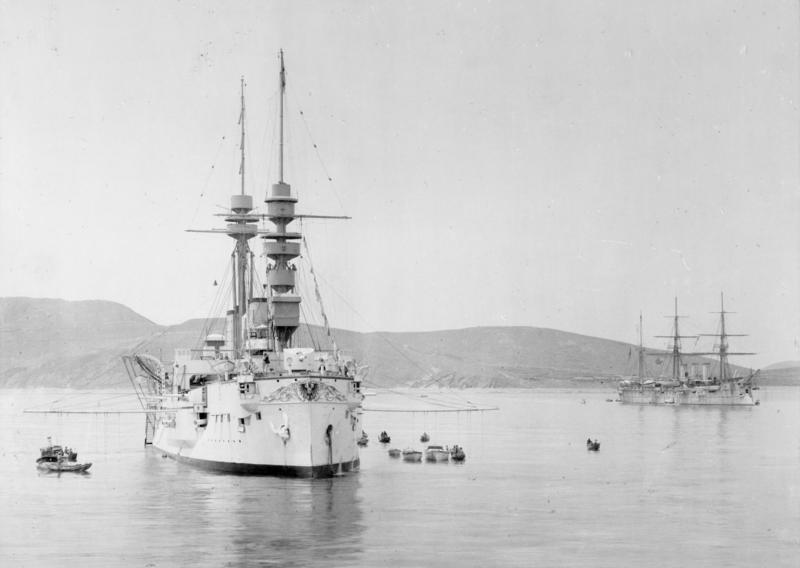
SMS Deutschland in 1898 at Port Arthur, China

For the 1877 maneuvers, the new turret ironclad Preussen replaced Kronprinz. The squadron was again sent to the Mediterranean, in response to unrest in the Ottoman Empire related to the Russo-Turkish War; the violence threatened German citizens living there. The squadron, again under the command of Batsch, steamed to the ports of Haifa and Jaffa in July 1877, but found no significant tensions ashore. Batsch then departed and cruised the Mediterranean for the remainder of the summer, returning to Germany in October. The newly commissioned Friedrich der Grosse and Grosser Kurfürst, sister ships of Preussen, replaced Deutschland and Kaiser in the 1878 maneuvers, during which Grosser Kurfürst was accidentally rammed and sank with great loss of life. Deutschland and her sister Kaiser remained in reserve for the next six years. They were reactivated in the spring of 1883 for the summer maneuvers under the command of Wilhelm von Wickede. Due to their long period out of service, their engines proved troublesome during the training cruise. Indeed, the maneuvers were temporarily put on hold when the steam plants in Deutschland, Kaiser, and Kronprinz broke down. Regardless, the 1883 cruise was the first year the German navy completely abandoned the use of sails on its large ironclads. Deutschland went into reserve during the 1884 maneuvers, which were conducted by a homogeneous squadron composed of the four Sachsen-class ironclads.

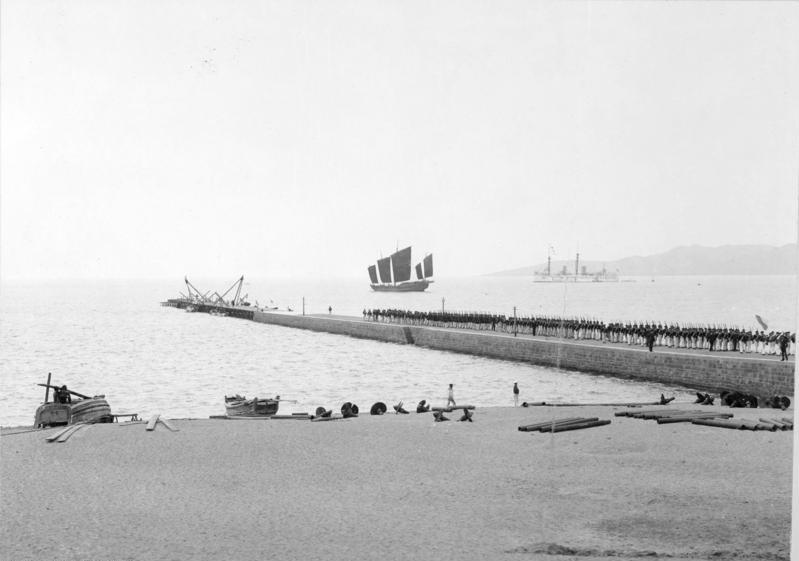
German marines from Deutschland practicing landing maneuvers on the long pier in Tsingtao; Deutschland is visible in the distance

The ship did not see active duty again until the summer of 1889, when Deutschland joined the fleet that steamed to Great Britain to celebrate the coronation of Kaiser Wilhelm II; the ship joined her sister Kaiser and the turret ships Preussen and Friedrich der Grosse in II Division. The fleet then held training maneuvers in the North Sea under command of Rear Admiral Friedrich von Hollmann. Deutschland and the rest of II Division became the training squadron for the fleet in 1889–1890, the first year the Kaiserliche Marine maintained a year-round ironclad force. The squadron escorted Wilhelm II's imperial yacht to the Mediterranean; the voyage included state visits to Italy and the Ottoman Empire. The squadron remained in the Mediterranean until April 1890, when it returned to Germany. Deutschland participated in the ceremonial transfer of the island of Helgoland from British to German control in the summer of 1890. She was present during the fleet maneuvers in September, where the entire eight-ship armored squadron simulated a Russian fleet blockading Kiel. II Division, including Deutschland, served as the training squadron in the winter of 1890–1891. The squadron again cruised the Mediterranean, under the command of Rear Admiral Wilhelm Schröder.

During the winter of 1892–1893, Deutschland participated in a training squadron alongside the old ironclad König Wilhelm and the new coastal defense ships Siegfried and Beowulf. The squadron carried over for the fleet maneuvers during the summer of 1893, when they were joined by the four Sachsen-class vessels. In November 1893, the Deutschland, König Wilhelm, and Friedrich der Grosse were joined by the brand-new pre-dreadnought battleship Brandenburg, under the command of Otto von Diederichs. The squadron participated in the fall maneuvers in 1894, which simulated a two-front war against France and Russia; Deutschland's squadron acted as the Russian fleet during the exercises. Between 1894 and 1897, Deutschland was rebuilt in the Imperial Dockyard in Wilhelmshaven. The ship was converted into an armored cruiser. Despite the modernization, she remained quite slow. Kaiser and the old ironclad König Wilhelm were similarly converted. Deutschland rejoined the fleet on 25 January 1897.

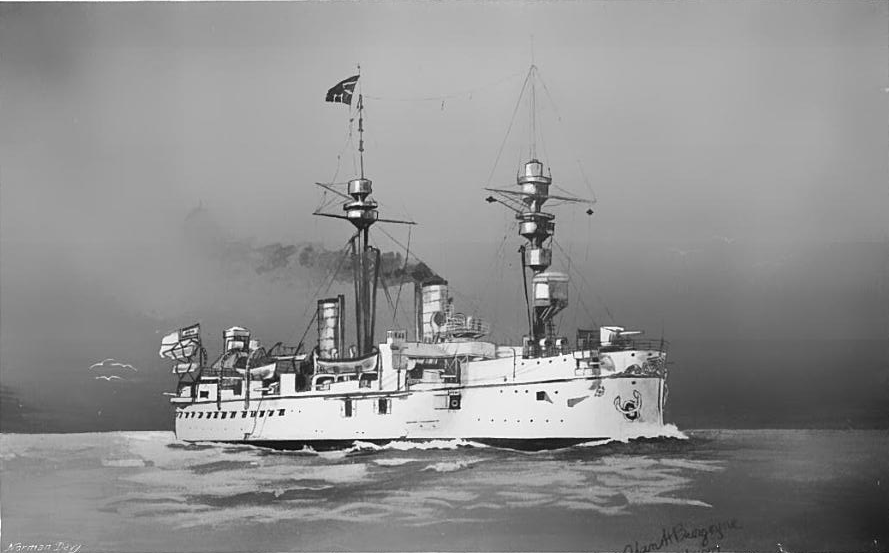
Deutschland as an armored cruiser

Following Diederichs's seizure of Jiaozhou Bay in November 1897, Deutschland, the protected cruiser Kaiserin Augusta, and the light cruisers Gefion and Cormoran reinforced the East Asia Cruiser Division. The arrival of the four ships allowed the division to be expanded to the East Asia Squadron. Prince Heinrich, with his flag aboard Deutschland, departed Germany in December 1897 with Gefion; the two ships arrived in Hong Kong in March 1898. Prince Heinrich took the two ships on a tour of Asia, culminating in a state visit to Beijing in April. While most of the Squadron went to the Philippines to safeguard German interests during the Spanish–American War in the summer of 1898, Deutschland, Gefion, and Irene remained in Chinese waters. On 14 April 1899, Diederichs left the East Asia Squadron; command passed to Prince Henry and Deutschland became the Squadron flagship.

Deutschland remained on the East Asia station until early 1900, when she traveled via the Mediterranean and Portsmouth to Kiel. After returning to Germany, Deutschland was used as a harbor ship, starting on 3 May 1904. She was renamed Jupiter on 22 November of that year. On 21 May 1906, the ship was stricken from the naval register and was converted to a target ship in 1907. The conversion work included adding watertight bulkheads and additional ballast. The first exercise was held in Howacht Bight on 16 June 1908. The armored cruiser Prinz Adalbert, which was at that time part of the gunnery training school, shelled Jupiter. Further trials were carried out through December, involving several other ships. Over the course of the exercises, Jupiter received some 140 hits from calibers ranging from 24 cm (9.4 in) down to 10.5 cm (4.1 in), though she was not significantly damaged by shell hits above the waterline. She was sunk twice, however, by shells that struck the water and penetrated the hull below the side armor. The Germans learned two important lessons from these tests: warships were difficult to sink by shellfire alone, but they were vulnerable to the until-then unknown phenomenon of diving shells. Deutschland was raised both times she sank, but tests were discontinued after the second time. The Kaiserliche Marine sold the ship at the end of 1908 for 120,000 marks; she was broken up for scrap the following year in Hamburg-Moorburg.
