= Admiral Hoffman =

Admiral Hoffman may refer to:

- Kurt-Caesar Hoffmann (1895–1988), German Navy vice admiral
- Paul Hoffmann (naval officer) (1846–1917), Imperial German Navy vice admiral
- Roy Hoffmann (born 1925), U.S. Navy rear admiral
- Theodor Hoffmann (admiral) (1935–2018), East German Navy admiral

== See also ==
- Michel Hofman (fl. 1970s–2020s), Belgian Navy admiral
