= Greek ship Vasilefs Georgios =

At least two ships of the Hellenic Navy have borne the name Vasilefs Georgios (Greek: Βασιλεύς Γεώργιος) after King George I of Greece:

- Greek ironclad Vasilefs Georgios, an armoured corvette launched in 1868 and scrapped in 1915.
- Greek destroyer Vasilefs Georgios, a destroyer launched in 1938. In 1942 she was commissioned into the Kriegsmarine first as ZG3 and then as Hermes. She was scuttled in 1943.
