= Paul Hoffmann (naval officer) =

- Born: June 20, 1846; Berlin, Germany
- Died: April 18, 1917 (aged 70); Munich, Germany
- Military career
- Allegiance: German Empire
- Branch: Imperial German Navy
- Service years: 1863-1902
- Rank: Vizeadmiral
- Commands: SMS Möwe; SMS Kaiser; SMS Siegfried; East Asia Squadron; II Battle Squadron; I Battle Squadron

Paul Hoffmann (20 June 1846 – 18 April 1917) was an officer of the Imperial German Navy (Kaiserliche Marine), who rose to the rank of vice-admiral.

In 1889 he was captain of SMS Kaiser, the lead ship of the Kaiser-class armored frigates commissioned on 13 February 1875. From 21 October to 12 November 1889, he had Emperor Wilhelm II as his guest during the Emperor's Mediterranean tour visiting Genoa, Athens, Istanbul and Venice. His diary entries from that period are interesting to the study of the Emperor's personality and enthusiasm for naval matters, and for the later service of the Emperor's brother Prince Heinrich in the Mediterranean.

From 1894 to 1896 he was head of the German East Asia Squadron stationed in Chinese waters.

== Bibliography ==
- Hildebrand, Hans; Henriot, Ernest (1988). H — O (in German). Vol. 2. Osnabrück: Biblio-Verl. pp. 123–124. ISBN 3764814993.
