= SMS Kaiser (1874) =

Armored frigate of the German Imperial Navy

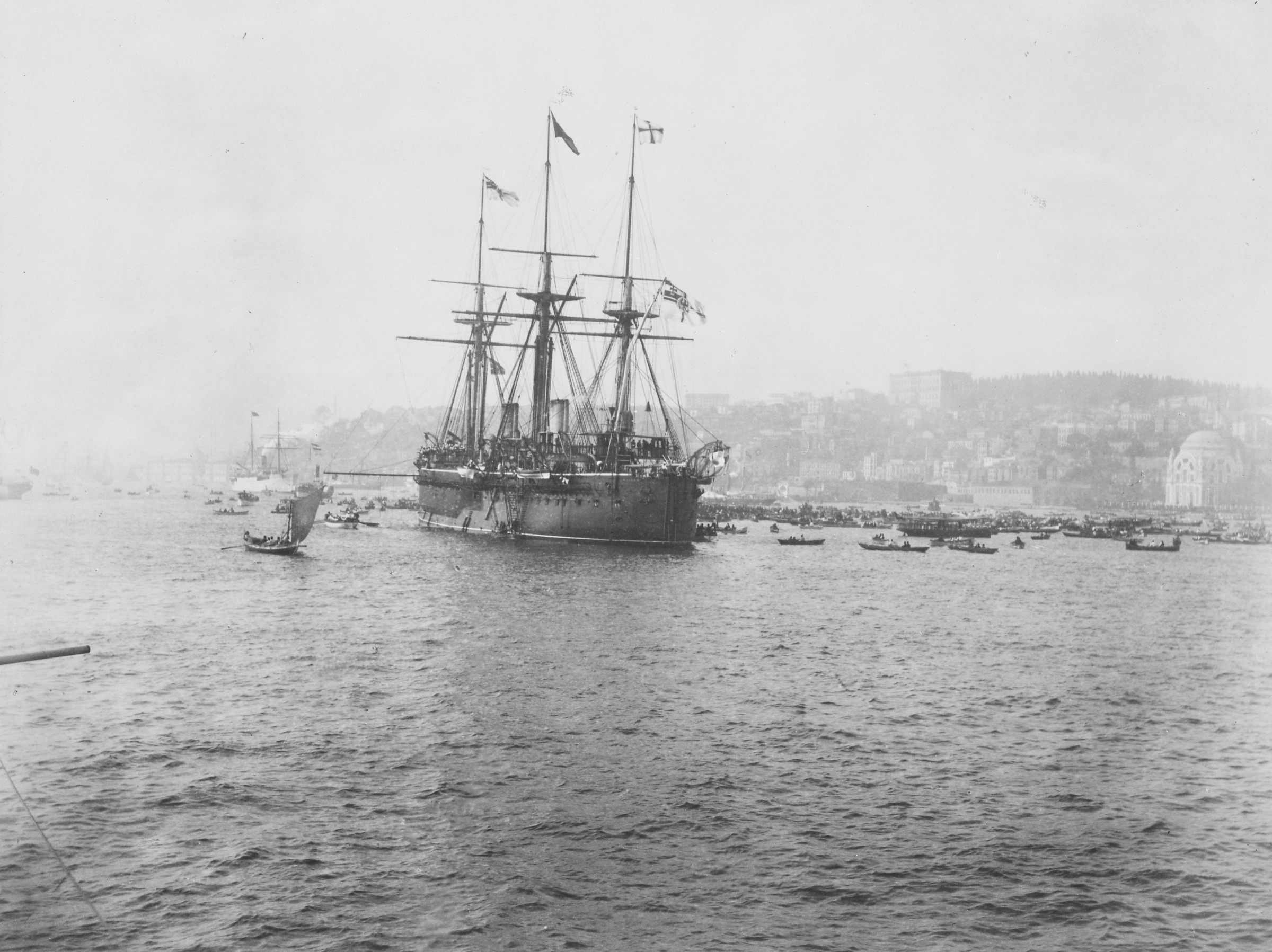
- SMS Kaiser in Constantinople

History

German Empire
- Name: SMS Kaiser
- Namesake: Kaiser
- Builder: Samuda Brothers, London
- Laid down: 1871
- Launched: 19 March 1874
- Commissioned: 13 February 1875
- Renamed: Uranus, 12 October 1905
- Fate: Scrapped at Harburg, 1920

General characteristics
- Class & type: Kaiser-class ironclad
- Displacement: Design: 7,645 t (7,524 long tons); Full load: 8,940 t (8,800 long tons)
- Length: 89.34 m (293.1 ft)
- Beam: 19.1 m (63 ft)
- Draft: 7.39 m (24.2 ft)
- Installed power: 8 × boilers; 5,779 metric horsepower (5,700 ihp)
- Propulsion: 1 × single-expansion steam engine; 1 × screw propeller
- Speed: 14.6 knots (27.0 km/h; 16.8 mph)
- Range: 2,470 nmi (4,570 km; 2,840 mi) at 10 knots (19 km/h; 12 mph)
- Complement: 32 officers; 568 enlisted men
- Armament: 8 × 26 cm (10.2 in) guns; 1 × 21 cm (8.3 in) gun
- Armor: Belt: 127 to 254 mm (5 to 10 in); Deck: 38 to 51 mm (1.5 to 2.0 in); Battery: 203 mm (8 in)

SMS Kaiser (Note: "SMS" stands for "Seiner Majestät Schiff", or "His Majesty's Ship".) was the lead ship of the Kaiser-class ironclads; SMS Deutschland was her sister ship. Named for the title "Kaiser" (German: Emperor), held by the leader of the then newly created German Empire, the ship was laid down in the Samuda Brothers shipyard in London in 1871. The ship was launched in March 1874 and commissioned into the German fleet in February 1875. Kaiser mounted a main battery of eight 26 cm (10.2 in) guns in a central battery amidships.

Kaiser served with the fleet from her commissioning until 1896, though she was frequently placed in reserve throughout her career. The ship was a regular participant in the annual fleet training maneuvers conducted with the exception of the mid-1880s, when she was temporarily replaced by newer vessels. She participated in several cruises in the Baltic and Mediterranean, often escorting Kaiser Wilhelm II on official state visits. Kaiser was rebuilt in the early 1890s as an armored cruiser, though she was too slow to perform satisfactorily in this role. Nevertheless, she spent several years as the flagship of the East Asia Squadron before returning to Germany in 1899. She was used in secondary roles after 1904, until after the end of World War I in 1919, when she was broken up for scrap.

== Design ==
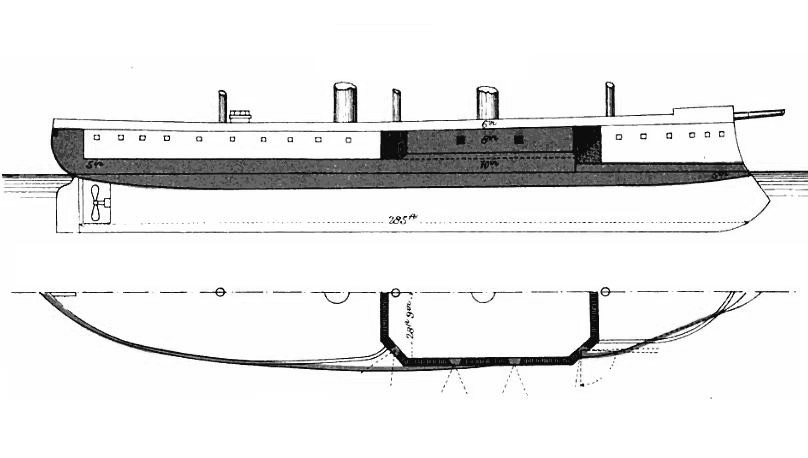
Plan and profile drawing of SMS Kaiser

The two Kaiser-class ironclads were authorized under the naval program of 1867, which had been approved by the Reichstag (Imperial Diet) to strengthen the North German Federal Navy in the wake of the Second Schleswig War, when the weak, then-Prussian Navy had been unable to break the blockade imposed by the Danish Navy. Designed by Edward James Reed in 1869, the ships were among the most powerful casemate ships built by any navy, though by the time they were completed they were rendered obsolescent by the advent of the turret ship.

The ship was 89.34 meters (293.1 ft) long overall and had a beam of 19.1 m (63 ft) and a draft of 7.39 m (24.2 ft) forward. She displaced 7,645 t (7,524 long tons) normally and up to 8,940 t (8,800 long tons) at full load. Kaiser was powered by one 2-cylinder single-expansion steam engine, which was supplied with steam by eight coal-fired trunk boilers. The boilers were vented into two widely spaced funnels. The propulsion system was rated at 14.6 knots (27.0 km/h; 16.8 mph) from 5,779 metric horsepower (5,700 ihp). She was also equipped with a full ship rig to supplement the steam engines. Her standard complement consisted of 32 officers and 568 enlisted men.

She was armed with a main battery of eight 26 cm RK L/20 (10.2 in) guns mounted in a central casemate located amidships. Two guns fired directly to each broadside, two fired in limited arcs ahead and to the side, and the remaining pair could engage targets in an astern arc. As built, the ship was also equipped with a single 21 cm (8.3 in) L/22 chase gun.

Kaiser's armor consisted of wrought iron; her armor belt was 127 to 254 mm (5 to 10 in) thick, above which a strake of armor that was 203 mm (8 in) thick protected the main battery guns in the casemate.

=== Modifications ===
The ship was converted into an armored cruiser; her heavy 26 cm guns were kept and she received a secondary battery that consisted of six 10.5 cm (4.1 in) L/35 guns, nine 8.8 cm (3.5 in) L/30, and one 15 cm (5.9 in) L/30 chase gun. She also had twelve 3.7 cm (1.5 in) auto-cannons fitted for defense against torpedo boats. Five 35 cm (13.8 in) torpedo tubes were installed. Three were in the hull above the waterline; one was in the stern and the other two were on the broadsides. The other two tubes were in the bow, below the waterline. In addition, she had an armor deck that was 38 to 51 mm (1.5 to 2.0 in) thick installed, and several watertight bulkheads were installed to improve the ship's resistance to flooding.

Her entire rigging equipment was removed and two heavy military masts were installed in place of the fore and main masts. Her mizzenmast was replaced by a light pole mast for signalling purposes. The ship had a maximum speed of 14 knots (26 km/h; 16 mph) by that time, and a cruising speed of 8.5 knots (15.7 km/h; 9.8 mph).

== Service history ==
Kaiser was ordered by the Imperial Navy from the Samuda Brothers shipyard in London; her keel was laid in 1871. Kaiser and her sister Deutschland were ordered shortly after the end of the Franco-Prussian War, under the assumption that the French would quickly attempt a war of revenge. The ship was launched on 19 March 1874 and commissioned into the German fleet on 13 February 1875.

After commissioning in February 1875, Kaiser spent the spring working up her engines to be ready for the annual summer training cruise. She joined the older ironclads Kronprinz and König Wilhelm and the new Hansa, under the command of Vice Admiral Ludwig von Henk. The four-ship squadron remained in German waters for the entirety of the cruise, which finished with a review of the flotilla in Rostock by Kaiser Wilhelm I in September. The squadron was reactivated the next spring; Rear Admiral Carl Ferdinand Batsch replaced Henk as the squadron commander. Kaiser served as the flagship of Batsch's squadron, which also included Kaiser's sister Deutschland, Kronprinz, and Friedrich Carl.

At around the time Batch's squadron was working up for the summer cruise, Henry Abbott, the German consul in Salonika, then in the Ottoman Empire, was murdered. Further attacks on German citizens living in the area were feared, and so Batsch was ordered to sail to the Mediterranean Sea to stage a naval demonstration in June 1876. After arriving with the four ironclads, he was reinforced by three unarmored vessels. After the threat of violence subsided in August, Batsch departed with Kaiser and Deutschland; the other two ironclads remained in the Mediterranean for the rest of the summer.

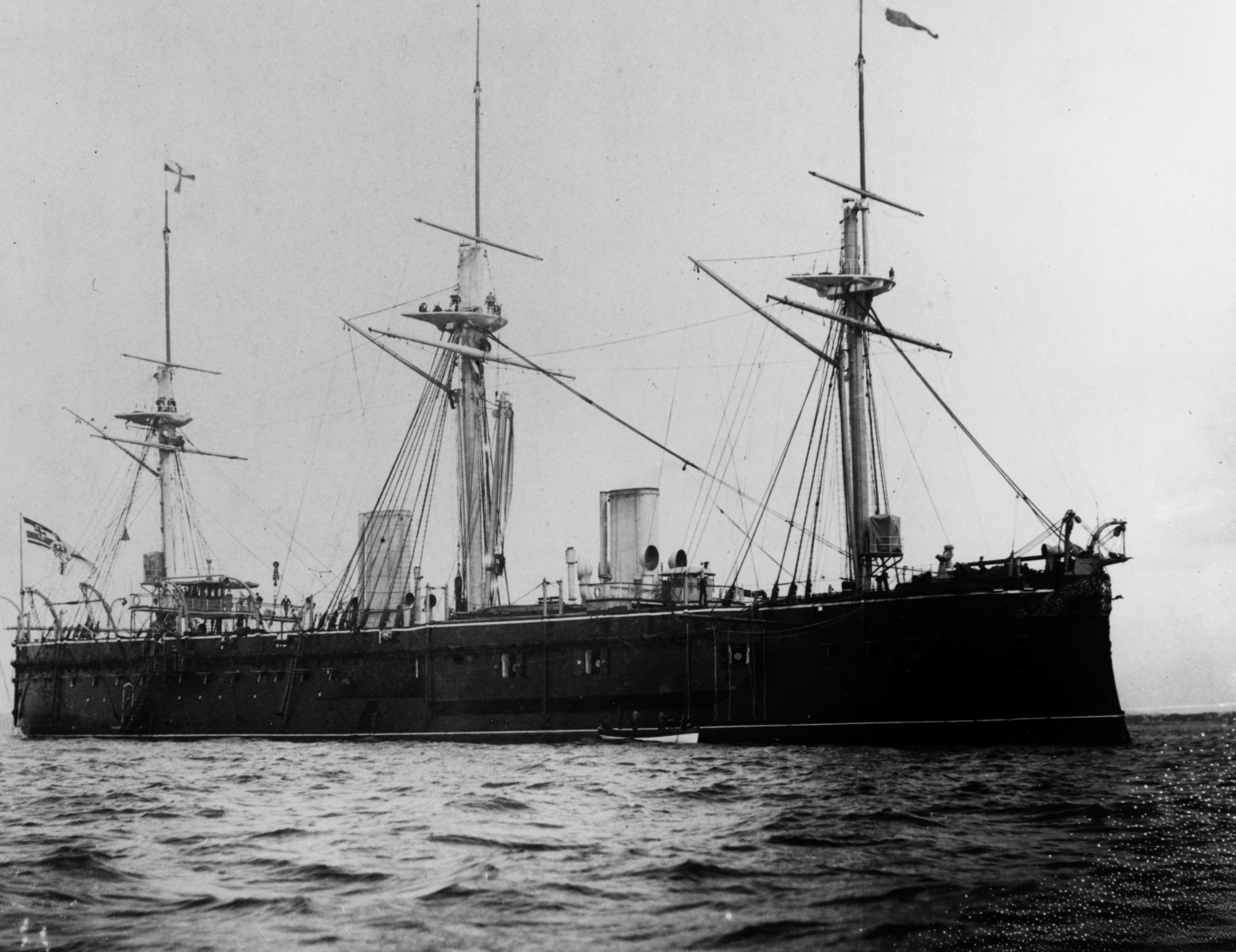
Kaiser in 1887

Kaiser joined the 1877 summer squadron, composed of Deutschland, Friedrich Carl, and the new turret ironclad Preussen. The squadron was again sent to the Mediterranean, in response to unrest in the Ottoman Empire related to the Russo-Turkish War; the violence threatened German citizens living there. The squadron, again under the command of Batsch, steamed to the ports of Haifa and Jaffa in July 1877, but found no significant tensions ashore. Batsch then departed and cruised the Mediterranean for the remainder of the summer, returning to Germany in October. The newly commissioned Friedrich der Grosse and Grosser Kurfürst, sister ships of Preussen, replaced Kaiser and Deutschland in the 1878 maneuvers, during which Grosser Kurfürst was accidentally rammed and sank with great loss of life.

Kaiser and her sister Deutschland remained in reserve for the next six years. During this time the single 21 cm (8.3 in) secondary gun was replaced by seven 15 cm (5.9 in) guns, five torpedo tubes were added and the rigging was reduced. The ships were reactivated in the spring of 1883 for the summer maneuvers under the command of Wilhelm von Wickede. Due to their long period out of service, their engines proved troublesome during the training cruise. Regardless, the 1883 cruise was the first year the German navy completely abandoned the use of sails on its large ironclads. Kaiser went into reserve during the 1884 maneuvers, which were conducted by a homogenous squadron composed of the four Sachsen-class ironclads. The ship did not see active duty again until August 1887, when she joined König Wihelm and Oldenburg as the I Squadron for three weeks of maneuvers with the rest of the fleet.

In May 1888, Kaiser represented Germany at Barcelona's World Fair, which held a naval review. During the summer of 1889, Kaiser joined the fleet that steamed to Great Britain to celebrate the coronation of Kaiser Wilhelm II; the ship joined her sister Deutschland and the turret ships Preussen and Friedrich der Grosse in II Division. The fleet then held training maneuvers in the North Sea under command of Rear Admiral Friedrich von Hollmann. Kaiser and the rest of II Division became the training squadron for the fleet in 1889–1890, the first year the Kaiserliche Marine maintained a year-round ironclad force. The squadron escorted Wilhelm II's imperial yacht to the Mediterranean; the voyage included state visits to Italy and the Ottoman Empire. The squadron remained in the Mediterranean until April 1890, when it returned to Germany.

Kaiser participated in the ceremonial transfer of the island of Helgoland from British to German control in the summer of 1890. She was present during the fleet maneuvers in September, where the entire eight-ship armored squadron simulated a Russian fleet blockading Kiel. II Division, including Kaiser, served as the training squadron in the winter of 1890–1891. The squadron again cruised the Mediterranean, under the command of Rear Admiral Wilhelm Schröder. Between 1891 and 1895, Kaiser was rebuilt in the Imperial Dockyard in Wilhelmshaven for conversion into an armored cruiser. Despite this modernization, she remained quite slow for a cruiser. Deutschland and König Wilhelm were similarly converted.

=== Service in East Asia ===
In 1895, commanded by Paul Jaeschke, Kaiser reinforced the East Asia Division, which also included the protected cruisers Irene and Prinzess Wilhelm and several smaller vessels. During the period of diplomatic tension between Britain and Germany caused by the Kruger telegram sent by Wilhelm II, Kaiser and several other overseas cruisers were ordered to return to German waters. This order was quickly reversed, as it was decided it would be seen as an act of weakness by Britain. In April 1896, while entering the port of Amoy, Kaiser struck an uncharted rock. Only minor damage was done to the hull, but the ship was still out of service for twenty-two days for repairs in Hong Kong. Kaiser served as the flagship of Rear Admiral Otto von Diederichs during his tenure as the division commander. Diederichs was tasked with locating a suitable concession to be used as the main port of the East Asia Division; after surveying a number of sites aboard Kaiser, Diederichs settled on Jiaozhou Bay. In the wake of two violent incidents against Germans in China, Wilhelm II gave Diederichs permission to seize Jiaozhou by force in November 1897.

After dusk on 10 November, Kaiser left Shanghai and headed toward Jiaozhou. Prinzess Wilhelm and the unprotected cruiser Cormoran were to leave the following day to allay suspicion. The three ships rendezvoused on the 12th at sea; Diederichs intended to steam into Jiaozhou on the 14th and seize the port. At 06:00 on the 14th, Cormoran steamed into the bay to bring the Chinese forts under fire, while Kaiser and Prinzess Wilhelm sent a landing force of some 700 men ashore. In the span of two hours, Diederichs's forces had captured the central and outlying forts and destroyed the Chinese telegraph, preventing them from notifying their superiors of the German attack. After negotiating with General Chang, the commander of the Jiaozhou garrison, Diederichs succeeded in forcing the Chinese concession of Jiaozhou to Germany, which he proclaimed at 14:20. Diederichs was promoted to vice admiral following the successful seizure of the port, and the division became enlarged to squadron size with the addition of several warships, including Kaiser's sister Deutschland.

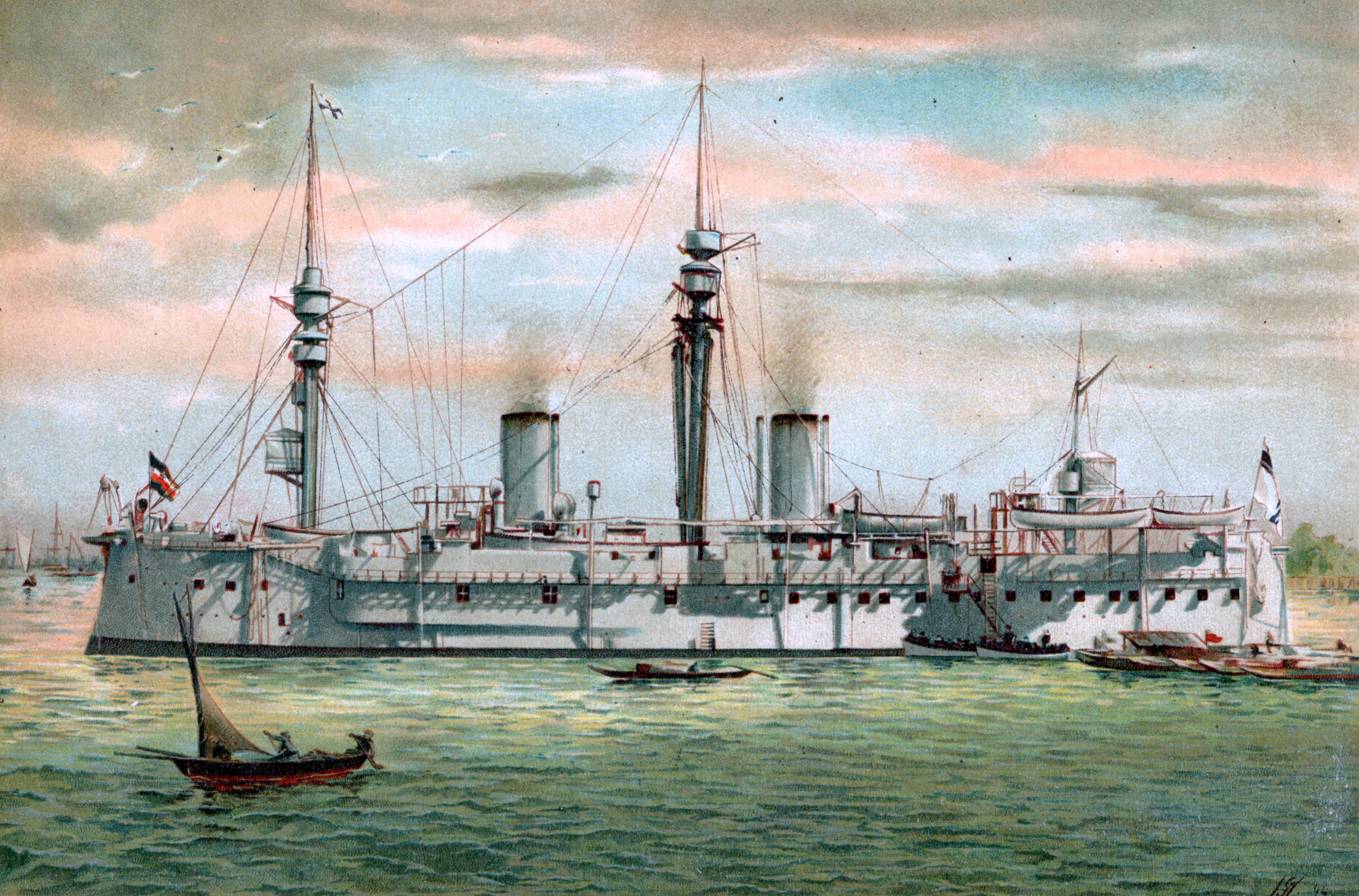
Kaiser as the harbor ship Uranus

In May 1898, Diederichs sent Kaiser to Nagasaki for periodic maintenance. The Spanish–American War, which saw action in the Philippines at the Battle of Manila Bay, necessitated a German naval presence in the area to protect German nationals. Kaiser was still in Nagasaki undergoing repairs, so Diederichs ordered her and Prinzess Wilhelm, also in dock for maintenance, to meet him in Manila as soon as was possible. Crew transfers during the repair process necessitated Irene and Cormoran to meet in Manila as well; this concentration of five warships in the Philippines caused a serious crisis with the American Navy. Rear Admiral George Dewey objected to the size of the German force and to a meeting between Diederichs and Governor General Augustin, the Spanish governor of the Philippines. The German naval forces left the Philippines after the fall of Manila in August, though tensions with the United States continued for some time after.

Following his departure from Manila in August 1898, Diederichs took Kaiser south to the Dutch East Indies. There, the ship represented Germany during celebrations for the coronation of Queen Wilhelmina. The ship then returned to Hong Kong via Singapore, before proceeding to Fuzhou for gunnery practice. While steaming into the bay, however, the ship ran aground on an uncharted rock. The screw corvette Arcona and Cormoran arrived to tow Kaiser off the rocks, after which Diederichs sent her back to Hong Kong for repairs. Kaiser remained overseas until 1899, when she returned to Germany. She was reduced to a harbor ship on 3 May 1904 and renamed Uranus on 12 October 1905. The ship was stricken from the naval register on 21 May 1906 and used as a barracks ship for Württemberg in Flensburg. Uranus was broken up in 1920 in Harburg.
