= Kaiser-class ironclad =

Armored frigate class of the German Imperial Navy

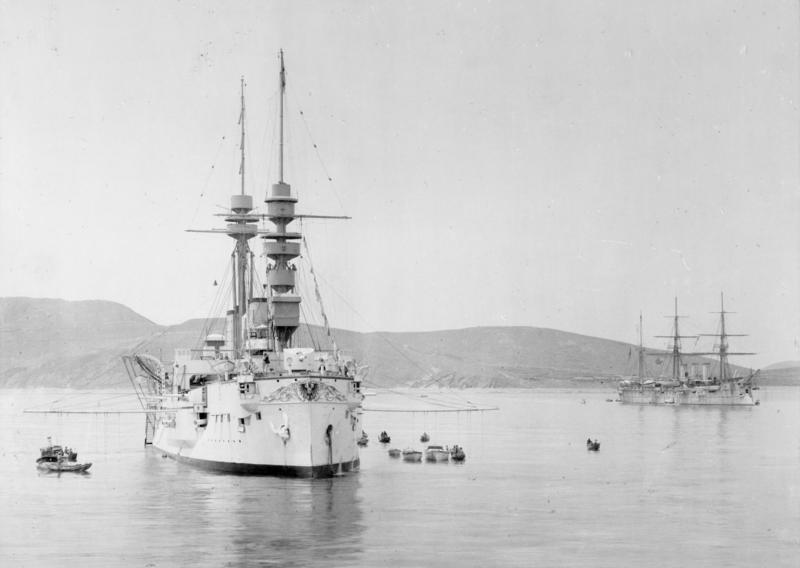
- SMS Deutschland

Class overview
- Operators: Imperial German Navy
- Preceded by: Preussen class
- Succeeded by: Sachsen class
- Built: 1871–1875
- In service: 1875–1904
- Completed: 2
- Retired: 2

General characteristics (as built)
- Class & type: Central battery ship
- Displacement: Design: 7,645 t (7,524 long tons); Full load: 8,940 t (8,800 long tons)
- Length: 89.34 m (293 ft 1 in)
- Beam: 19.1 m (62 ft 8 in)
- Draft: 7.39 m (24 ft 3 in)
- Installed power: 8 × boilers; 5,600 metric horsepower (5,500 ihp)
- Propulsion: 1 × single-expansion steam engine; 1 × screw propeller
- Speed: 14 knots (26 km/h; 16 mph)
- Range: 2,470 nmi (4,570 km; 2,840 mi) at 10 knots (19 km/h; 12 mph)
- Complement: 32 officers; 568 enlisted men
- Armament: 8 × 26.3 cm (10.4 in) guns; 1 × 21 cm (8.3 in) gun
- Armor: Belt: 127 to 254 mm (5 to 10 in); Deck: 38 to 51 mm (1.5 to 2.0 in); Battery: 203 mm (8 in)

The Kaiser class of ironclad warships was a pair of vessels built for the German Kaiserliche Marine (Imperial Navy) in the early 1870s. The lead ship, Kaiser, was laid down in 1871 and launched in 1874. Deutschland was laid down in 1872 and launched in 1874; both ships were built by the Samuda Brothers shipyard in London. They were the last German capital ships built by a foreign shipyard. Built as armored frigates, the ships were armed with a main battery of eight 26 cm (10 in) guns in a central armored battery and were capable of a top speed of 14 knots (26 km/h; 16 mph).

Both ships served with the fleet following their commissioning in 1875, though they spent a significant part of their career in reserve, as Germany maintained only a small number of ships on active duty for training cruises in the period. The ships were substantially rebuilt in the 1890s into armored cruisers and stationed in Asia for three years. Kaiser was the flagship of Otto von Diederichs's East Asia Squadron during the Jiaozhou Bay Leased Territory seizure in November 1897. Following their return to Germany in 1899–1900, the ships were used in several secondary roles, including as harbor and barracks ships. The ships were stricken from the naval register in 1906; Deutschland was used as a target ship before being sold for scrap in 1908, though Kaiser served on as a floating barracks until she was sold in 1920.

== Design ==
In 1867, the new North German Reichstag (Imperial Diet) approved a fleet plan that called for a fleet of sixteen ironclad warships (along with a number of other warships) by 1877. The ironclad fleet was intended to serve as a coastal defense force to prevent another blockade of German ports as had been conducted by the Danish Navy during the Second Schleswig War in 1864. By the end of the decade, nine ships had either been purchased abroad or laid down in German shipyards. Two more ships, which would become the Kaiser class, were authorized and ordered from Britain. The design for these vessels was prepared in 1869 by Edward Reed, though work was delayed until 1871. General Albrecht von Stosch, who had by 1872 become the chief of the Imperial Admiralty, objected to the use of a British shipbuilder, preferring to use the contracts to encourage domestic shipbuilding. As a result, they proved to be the last German capital ships built abroad.

Reed designed the vessels as casemate ships, mounting a smaller battery of guns, albeit of a larger caliber, compared to traditional broadside ironclads. The casemate arrangement was more flexible than the broadside, as guns could be moved between different firing ports, and since the casemate was sponsoned out over the hull, the guns could be directed forward and aft. Upon completion in 1875, the two vessels were regarded by foreign navies as the most powerful vessels of the type, though they were by then obsolescent compared to the latest turret ships being built. They nevertheless led to the British Royal Navy to order two more ships of the same type: HMS Alexandra and Temeraire, which carried even larger guns.

=== General characteristics ===
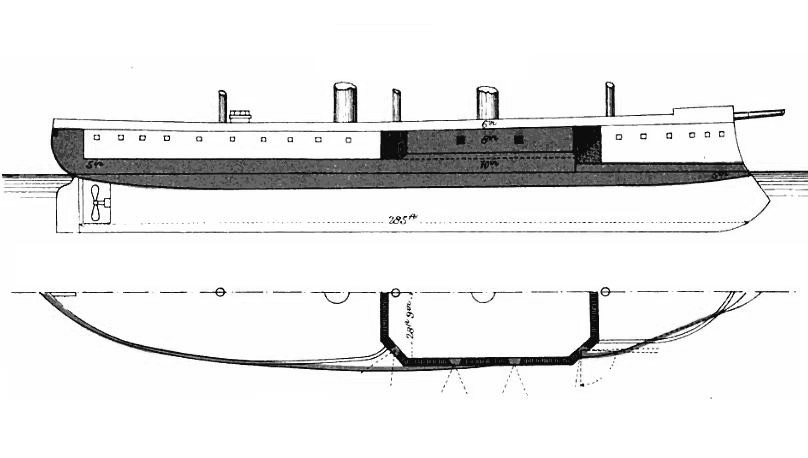
Plan and profile drawing of the Kaiser class; the shaded areas represent the portion of the ships protected by armor

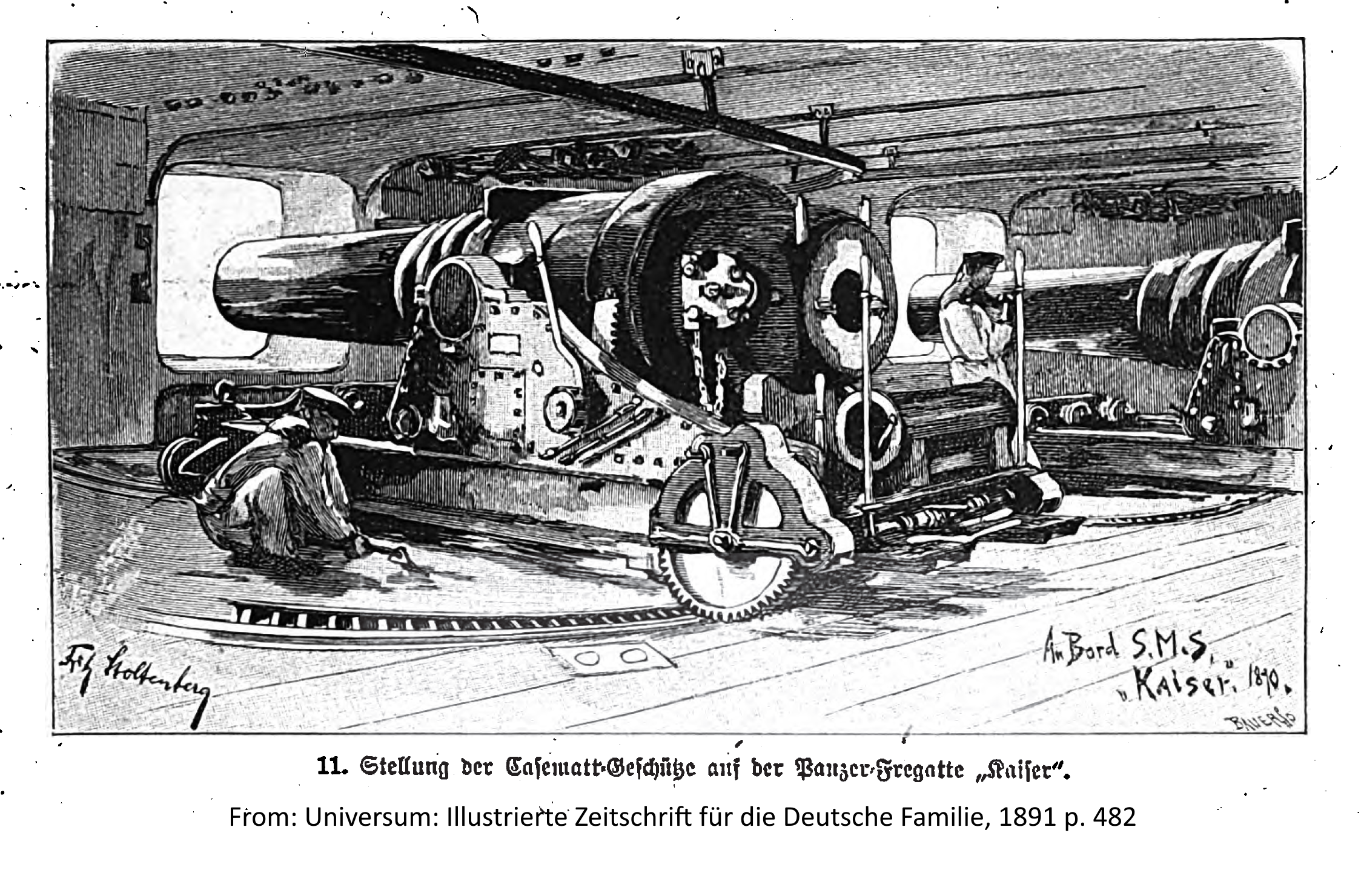
26 cm RK L/20 in the battery of SMS Kaiser, 1890

The Kaiser-class ships were 88.5 m (290 ft 4 in) long at the waterline and 89.34 meters (293 ft 1 in) long overall. They had a beam of 19.1 m (62 ft 8 in) and a draft of 7.39 m (24 ft 3 in). At the designed displacement, the vessels displaced 7,654 metric tons (7,533 long tons). When the vessels were fully loaded, they displaced 8,940 t (8,800 long tons). Their hulls were built with transverse bulkheads and double longitudinal iron frames; iron plating covered teak backing. The ships had nine watertight compartments and a double bottom that ran for 59 percent of the hull length.

The German navy regarded the ships as good sea boats, very sensitive to commands from the helm, and with a gentle motion. The ships had a moderate turning radius and were very stable. Their standard complement consisted of 32 officers and 568 enlisted men, and while serving as a squadron flagship, this could be augmented by an additional nine officers and 47 sailors. When serving as the second flagship, the crew was increased by six officers and 35 enlisted men. After their reconstruction in the 1890s, the ships' crews were significantly increased, to 36 officers and 620 enlisted men. The size of the command staffs grew as well, to 11 officers and 57 enlisted for the squadron flagship and nine officers and 48 men for the second flagship. The ships carried a number of smaller boats, including one picket boat, two launches, one pinnace, two cutters, two yawls, and two dinghies.

The two ships were powered by a two-cylinder single-expansion steam engine built by John Penn and Sons of Greenwich. The ships' engines drove a single four-bladed screw propeller that was 6.86 m (22 ft 6 in) in diameter. The engines were supplied with steam by eight coal-fired trunk boilers, which were also provided by J Penn & Sons. The eight boilers were trunked into two large, retractable funnels. They were also equipped with a full ship rig with a total surface area of 1,623 m^{2} (17,470 sq ft). Three generators provided 30 kilowatts of electrical power. The ships' designed speed was 14 knots (26 km/h; 16 mph), at over 5,600 metric horsepower (5,500 ihp). The ships were designed to store 680 t (670 long tons; 750 short tons) of coal, though Deutschland was modified to carry up to 880 t (870 long tons; 970 short tons). Kaiser was able to steam for 2,470 nautical miles (4,570 km; 2,840 mi) at a cruising speed of 10 knots (19 km/h; 12 mph), though due to her significantly greater fuel capacity, Deutschland could steam for 3,200 nmi (5,900 km; 3,700 mi) at that speed. At maximum speed, the ships' ranges were reduced to 1,115 nmi (2,065 km; 1,283 mi) and 1,440 nmi (2,670 km; 1,660 mi), respectively.

=== Armament and armor ===
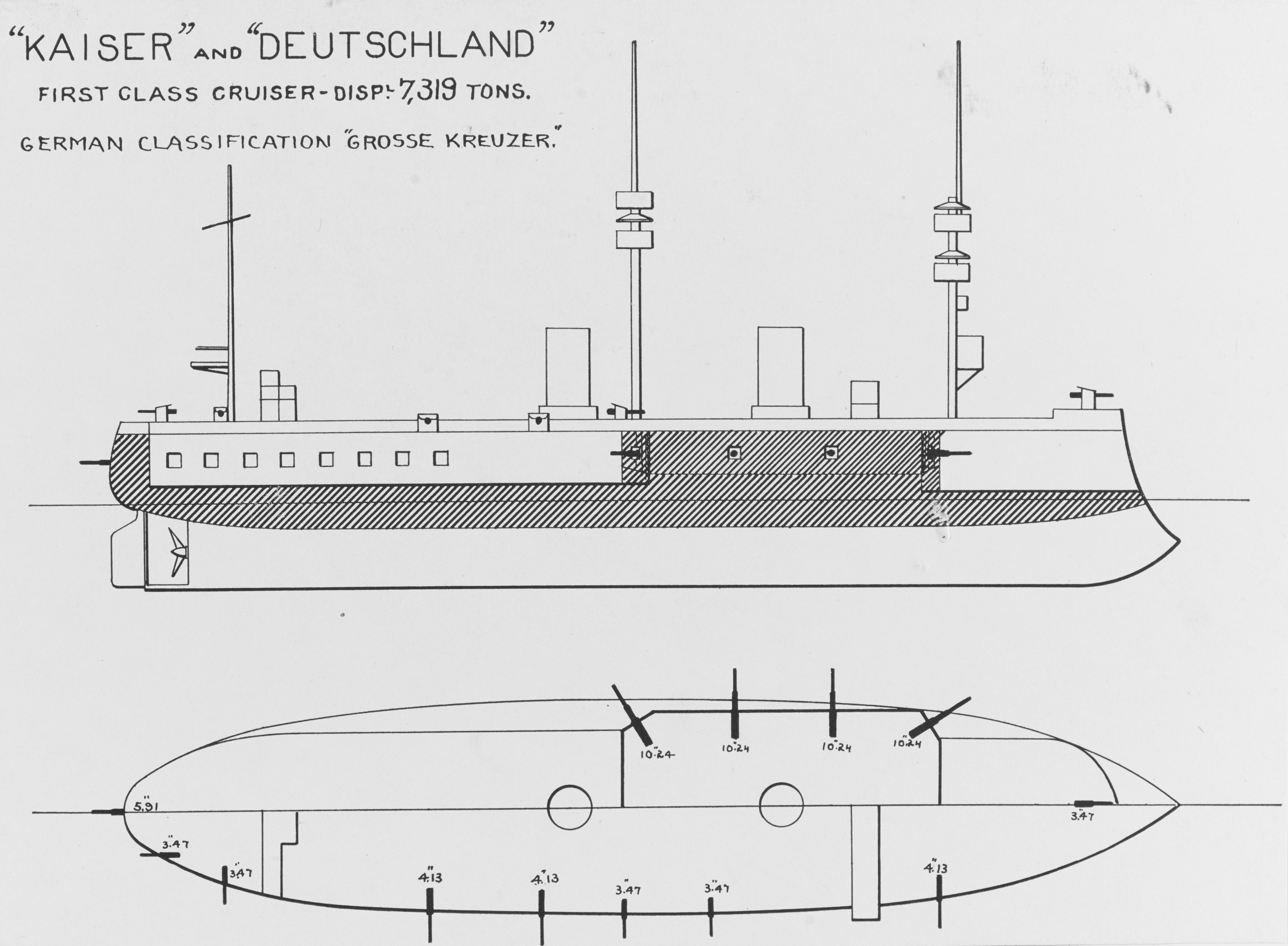
Plan and profile drawing of the Kaiser class after conversion into armored cruisers

The Kaiser-class ships were armed with a main battery of eight 26-centimeter (10.2 in) L/20 guns mounted in a central armored casemate amidships. (Note: L/20 denotes the length of the gun in terms of bore caliber. An L/20 gun is twenty calibers, meaning it is twenty times as long as it is wide in diameter.) These guns were supplied with 768 rounds of ammunition. They could depress to −4° and elevate to 9°; this enabled a maximum range of 5,200 m (5,700 yd). As built, the ships were also equipped with one 21 cm (8.3 in) L/22 gun. The 21 cm weapon had a maximum range of 5,900 m (6,500 yd).

Between 1891 and 1897, Kaiser and Deutschland were rebuilt and the secondary armament was significantly increased. In addition to the eight main guns Kaiser was equipped with one 15 cm (5.9 in) L/30 gun, six 10.5 cm (4.1 in) SK L/30 quick-firing guns, and nine 8.8 cm (3.46 in) SK L/30 quick-firing guns, while eight 15 cm L/30 and eight 8.8 cm SK L/30 guns were installed on Deutschland. Four 3.7 cm (1.5 in) auto-cannon were added as well. Both ships also had five 35 cm (13.8 in) torpedo tubes added: Deutschland's tubes were installed in the hull, underwater, while Kaiser's tubes were placed above water. Both ships had a stock of 13 torpedoes.

The ships' armor was made of wrought iron and backed with teak. The armored belt ranged in thickness from 127 to 254 mm (5 to 10 in) and was backed with 90 to 226 mm (3.5 to 8.9 in) of teak. Their decks were 38 to 51 mm (1.5 to 2.0 in) thick. Kaiser's conning tower was protected with a 30 mm (1.2 in) thick roof and 50 mm (2 in) thick sides, while Deutschland's had a 30 mm thick roof and 100 mm (3.9 in) thick sloped side armor. The central battery, which housed the ships' main armament, was 203 mm (8 in) thick on the broadside and 178 mm (7 in) thick on the sloped ends. This was backed with 264 mm (10.4 in) and 192 mm (7.6 in) thick sections of teak, respectively.

== Ships ==
Ship Name	Builder	Laid Down	Launched	Commissioned
Kaiser	Samuda Brothers, London	1871	19 March 1874	13 February 1875
Deutschland	Samuda Brothers, London	1872	12 September 1874	20 July 1875

== Service history ==
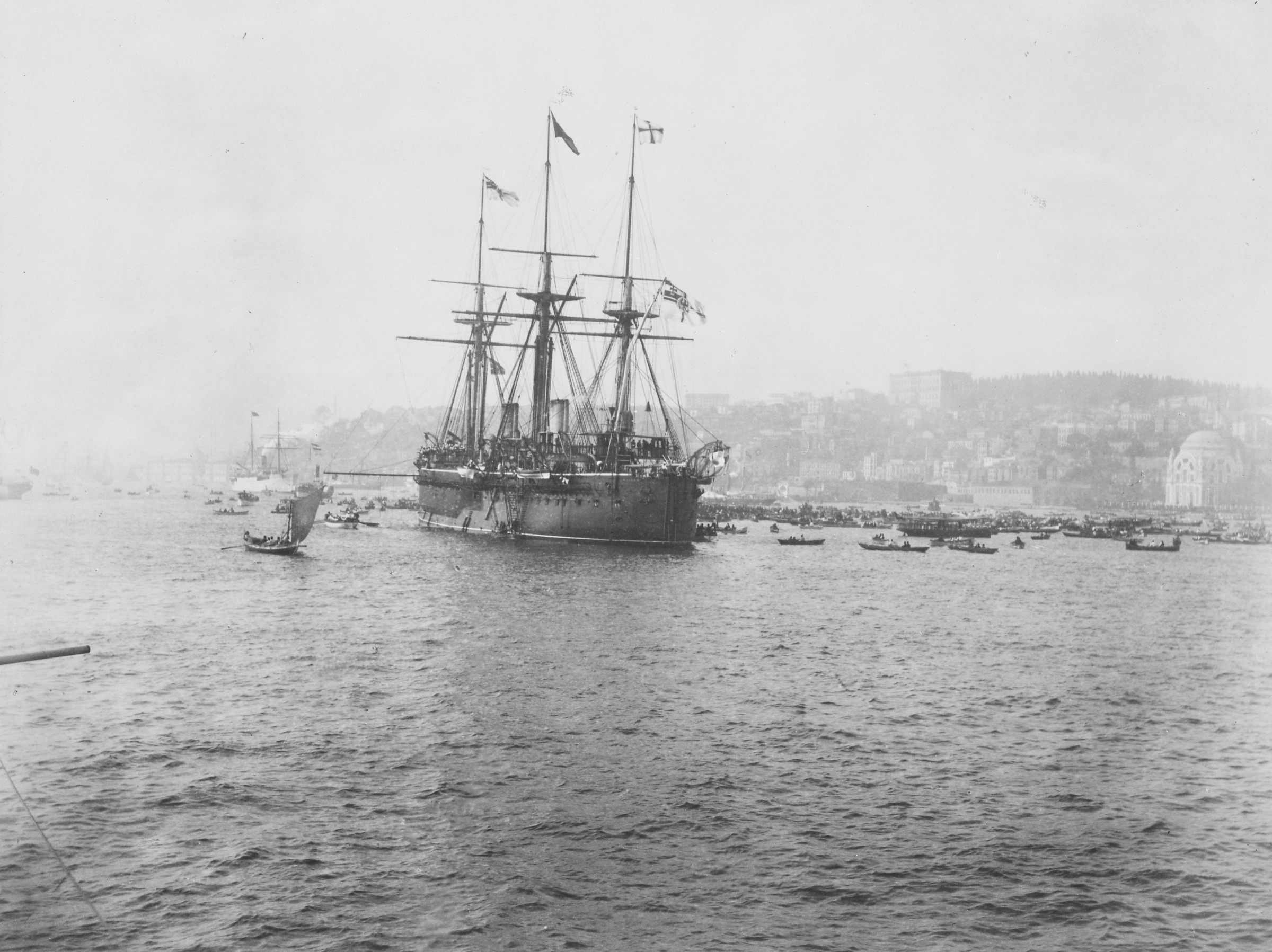
Kaiser in Constantinople

After their commissioning in 1875, both ships served with the fleet. They formed half of a squadron sent to the Mediterranean Sea in 1877 in response to unrest in the Ottoman Empire related to the Russo-Turkish War; the violence threatened German citizens living there. The squadron, under the command of Rear Admiral Carl Ferdinand Batsch, steamed to the ports of Haifa and Jaffa in July 1877, but found no significant tensions ashore. Batsch then departed and cruised the Mediterranean for the remainder of the summer, returning to Germany in October.

Kaiser and Deutschland were placed in reserve after the 1878 maneuvers were cancelled and remained there for a decade, with the exception of the 1883 maneuvers. During the maneuvers, both ships' steam engines proved troublesome, and indeed forced a temporary halt to the training exercises when they simultaneously broke down. The two ships were reactivated in 1889 to participate in cruises following the coronation of Kaiser Wilhelm II. These included a state visit to Great Britain in August 1889 and a tour of the Mediterranean in the winter of 1889–1890.

Between 1891 and 1897, the two ships were heavily rebuilt as armored cruisers. They were significantly rearmed with a large number of medium and smaller caliber guns. Kaiser served in Asian waters from 1897 to 1899, while her sister was on the Asia station from 1898 to 1900. Admiral Otto von Diederichs, then the commander of the East Asia Squadron, used Kaiser for his flagship. The ship was involved in the Jiaozhou Bay Leased Territory seizure in November 1897 and was later deployed to protect German interests in the Philippines during the Spanish–American War in 1898.

Kaiser and Deutschland were reduced to harbor ships on 3 May 1904. Kaiser was renamed Uranus on 12 October 1905 and Deutschland became Jupiter on 22 November of that year. The ships were stricken from the naval register on 21 May 1906; Deutschland was used briefly as a target ship in 1907 while Kaiser was used as a barracks ship for Württemberg in Flensburg. The Kaiserliche Marine sold Deutschland in 1908 for 120,000 marks; she was broken up for scrap the following year in Hamburg-Moorburg. Kaiser was ultimately broken up in 1920 in Harburg.
