= Greek ironclad Vasilefs Georgios =

Ironclad warship of the Greek Navy

History

Greece
- Name: Vasilefs Georgios
- Namesake: King George
- Builder: Thames Ironworks, Blackwall, London
- Launched: 28 December 1867
- Completed: 1868
- Decommissioned: 1915
- Reclassified: Training ship, early 1900s
- Fate: Scrapped, 1915

General characteristics (as built)
- Type: Armored corvette
- Displacement: 1,774 long tons (1,802 t)
- Length: 200 ft 2 in (61.0 m)
- Beam: 33 ft (10.1 m)
- Draft: 16 ft (4.9 m)
- Installed power: 2,100 ihp (1,600 kW)
- Propulsion: 1 shaft, 1 steam engine
- Sail plan: Schooner rigged
- Speed: 12 knots (22 km/h; 14 mph)
- Range: 1,300 nautical miles (2,400 km; 1,500 mi) at 10 knots (19 km/h; 12 mph)
- Complement: 152
- Armament: 2 × 9-inch (228.6 mm) rifled muzzle-loading guns; 2 × 20-pounder rifled breech-loading guns
- Armor: Belt: 4.5–7 in (114–178 mm); Battery: 6 in (152 mm)

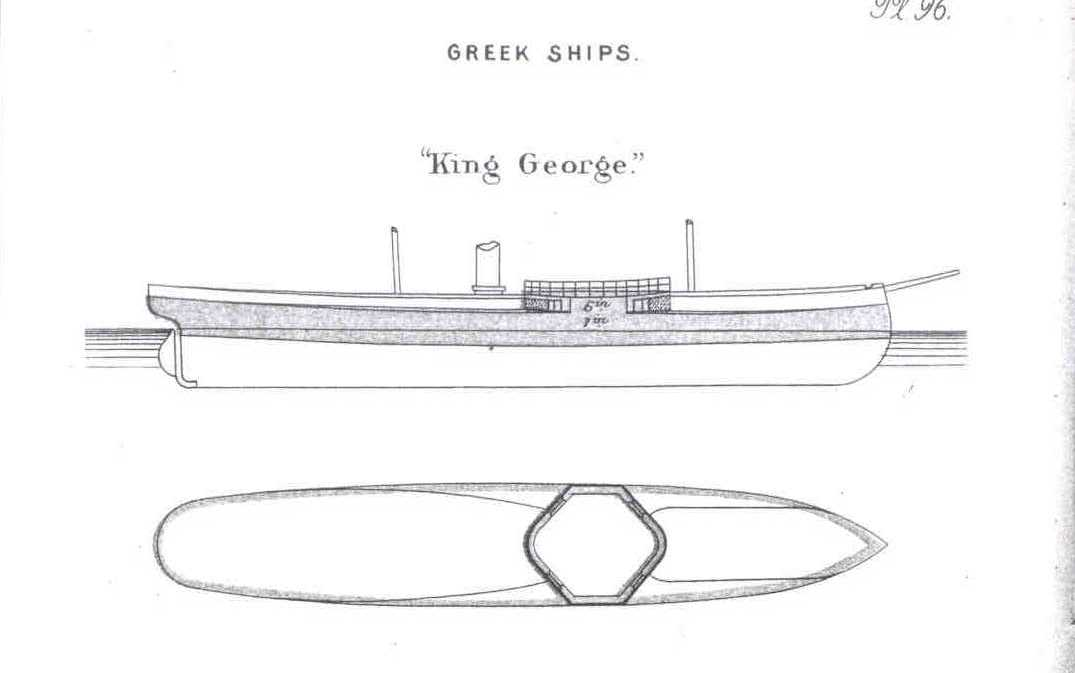

The Greek ironclad Vasilefs Georgios (Greek: Βασιλεύς Γεώργιος) was an armored corvette built in Great Britain for the Royal Hellenic Navy during the 1860s. She became a cadet training ship before she was stricken from the Navy List in 1912. The ship was scrapped in 1915.

== Description ==
Vasilefs Georgios had a length overall of 213 feet 3 inches (65.0 m) long, a beam of 33 feet 2 inches (10.1 m) and a mean draft of 20 feet (6.1 m). The ship displaced 1,774 long tons (1,802 t). She had horizontal single-expansion steam engines that drove two propellers. The engines were designed to produce a total of 2,400 indicated horsepower (1,800 kW) to give the ship a speed of 14 knots (26 km/h; 16 mph), but only produced 2,100 ihp (1,600 kW) for a speed of 12 knots (22 km/h; 14 mph). For long-distance travel, Vasilefs Georgios was fitted with two masts and schooner rigged. She carried 210 long tons (210 t) of coal that gave her a range of about 1,300 nautical miles (2,400 km; 1,500 mi) at full speed. The ship had a crew of 120 officers and crewmen.

Vasilefs Georgios was armed with a pair of Armstrong nine-inch (229 mm) rifled muzzle-loading guns. The ship was a central-battery ironclad with the armament concentrated amidships in a hexagonal armored citadel. The citadel was protected by six-inch (152 mm) plates and the entire ship's side was covered by armor that had a maximum thickness of seven inches (178 mm) amidships and reduced to four point five inches (114 mm) at the ends.

== Construction and service ==
Vasilefs Georgios, named for King George I of Greece, was built by Thames Ironworks, Blackwall, London. She was launched on 28 December 1867 and completed the following year. In February 1870, Vasilefs Georgios was damaged at sea, guns in one of her turrets being dislodged. She put in to Lisbon, Portugal on 9 February for repairs, her crew refusing to proceed. The ship became a training ship for naval cadets around the end of the 19th century. She was stricken in 1912. Vasilefs Georgios was broken up in 1915.

== Bibliography ==
- Chesneau, Roger & Kolesnik, Eugene M., eds. (1979). Conway's All the World's Fighting Ships 1860–1905. Greenwich: Conway Maritime Press. ISBN 0-8317-0302-4.
- Gardiner, Robert & Gray, Randal, eds. (1985). Conway's All the World's Fighting Ships 1906–1921. Annapolis: Naval Institute Press. ISBN 0-87021-907-3.
- "Greek Ironclads Olga and Georgios". Warship International. X (2). Naval Records Club: 212–214. 1973. ISSN 0043-0374.
- Silverstone, Paul H. (1984). Directory of the World's Capital Ships. New York: Hippocrene Books. ISBN 0-88254-979-0.
