= 26 cm RK L/20 =

1870s Krupp naval artillery gun

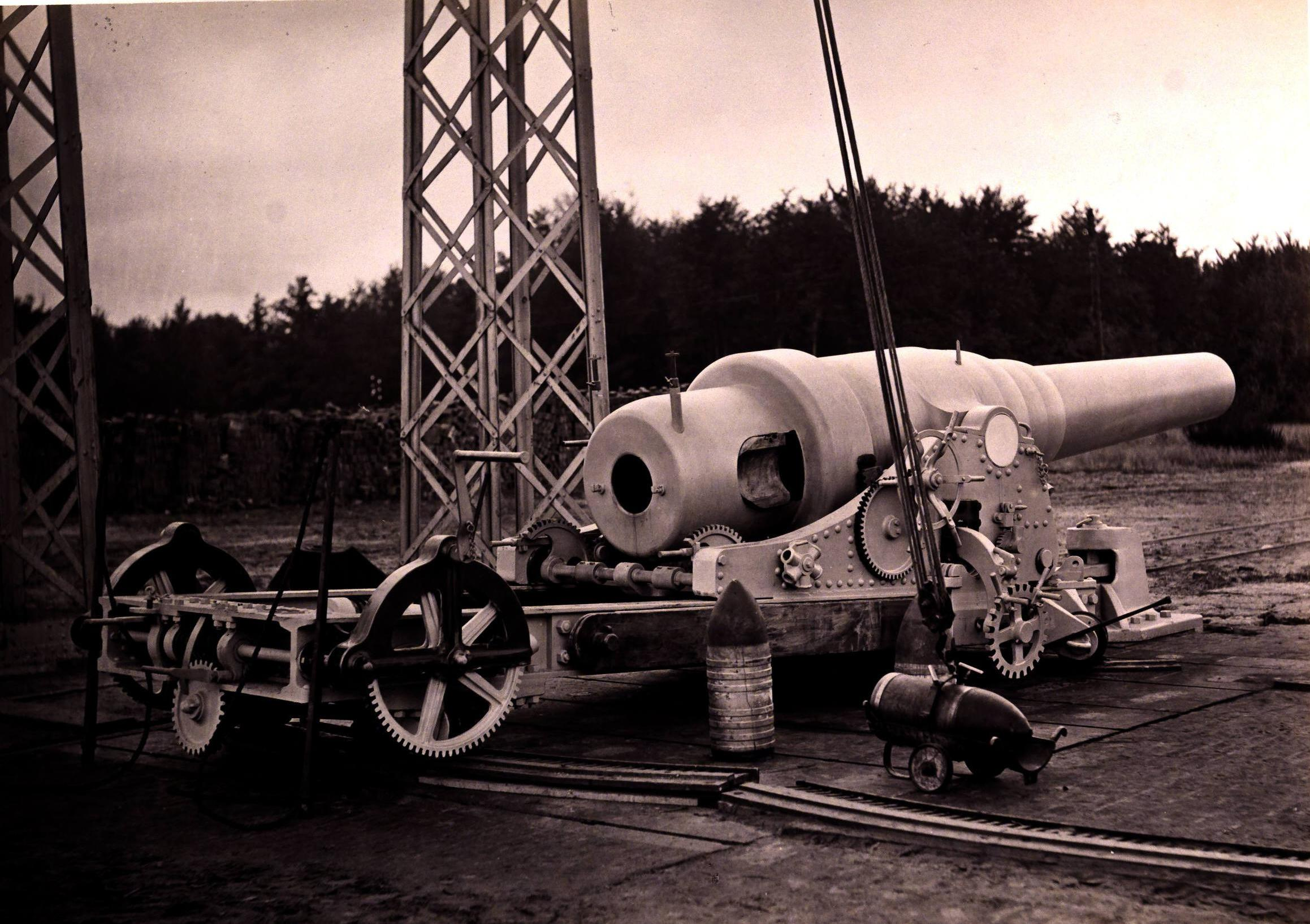
- The 26 cm RK L/20 model 1870
- Type: Naval gun
- Place of origin: Kingdom of Prussia

Service history
- Used by: Imperial German Navy

Production history
- Designer: Krupp
- Designed: 1870
- Manufacturer: Krupp

Specifications
- Mass: 18,000 kg
- Length: 5,200 mm (L/20)
- Caliber: 260.0 mm (Original) 262.5 mm (Adapted)
- Breech: horizontal sliding wedge
- Muzzle velocity: 1875: 436 m/s.; later: 500 m/s

The 26 cm RK L/20 was a gun from a family of Krupp naval artillery guns designed in the late 1860s. The gun resembled the 26 cm RK L/22, but was shorter, so it could be used in the central battery of certain ships. The gun came in an early variant with a 260 mm caliber. Later, these guns were adapted to 263 mm caliber.

== Context ==
In the late 1860s, Krupp designed a number of Ring Kanone (a type of built-up guns) for use on board ships, and for use as coastal artillery. These had the 15, 21, and 24 cm caliber in common and were about 20 calibers long. After these guns had proved themselves in extensive tests, Krupp got the order to design longer versions. These were 22 calibers long (L/22).

It was immediately clear that these three calibers would not be enough in the near future. Therefore, the coastal artillery would be expanded with the 28 cm caliber. For use on board ships, the heaviest caliber would be only 26 cm.

== The early 26 cm RK L/20 (260 mm) ==
=== Development ===
The long 26 cm gun for use on board ships was designed in 1869 and was only meant for the turret ships of the Preussen class. As turret ships required fewer guns than broadside ships, these guns could generally be heavier (22t). In part, this explains why the first 26 cm gun was long, 5,720 mm/260 mm = L/22.

As the weight of the long 26 cm gun was too high for specific ships, the German Admiralty ordered a lighter 'kurze 26 cm Ring Kanone' in 1871. This 26 cm RK L/20 weighed 18,000 kg. The barrel had 36 parallel grooves which were 3.2 mm deep and had a twist length of 50 calibers. The overall barrel length was 5,200 mm and caliber was 260 mm.

In 1873/4 the use of copper driving bands was tested for the long 26 cm gun. In 1874 a short 26 cm barrel (No. 13) with 36 parallel grooves and a twist length of 50 calibers was tested with projectiles which had copper driving bands. However, these tests were not successful, and so in December 1874, the Admiralty decided to go back to using lead for driving the projectile through the barrel.

At first, the short 26 cm gun was known simply as 'kurze 26 cm Ring Kanone'. As the length of guns increased, it became part of the name of a gun. The 'kurze 26 cm Ring Kanone' thus became the '26 cm Ring Kanone L/20, abbreviated to 26 cm RK L/20.

=== Gunpowder ===
In 1872, the Prussian Artillerie Prüfungskommission (Artillery Test Commission) decided to test slower burning gunpowders for the 26 and 28 cm guns. In December 1875, the Admiralty decided that the Prismatic Gunpowder P.P. c/75 would be used. This slower burning gunpowder made it possible to increase the charge of the gun, even while the peak pressure remained lower.

=== Carriages ===
The 26 cm RK L/20 initially had two carriages. The first was the Rahmenlafette für eine Pforte c/75. This had a trunnion height of 1,230 mm. It allowed elevation to 11° and declination to 6.5°. It weighed 9,200 kg. Later a model C/84 was made for the gun.

=== The Vienna model ===
At the 1873 Vienna World's Fair, Krupp exhibited a 26 cm RK L/22. It is of course interesting to check whether this gun was the same as that used by the German Navy. The gun was described as: 5.2 m long, 260 mm caliber; length of bore 4,420 mm, weight 18,000 kg. These rough characteristics were the same.

This Vienna gun shot two projectiles: A steel grenade of 184 kg was propelled to a velocity of 450 m/s by 37.5 kg of gunpowder. A cast steel long grenade of 159 kg was fired by a charge of 30 kg of gunpowder and then reached the same velocity. The difference was in the rifling of this gun. The Vienna gun had 64 parallel grooves that gave a twist length of 18.2 m (L/70). In between the grooves, the lands (areas between the grooves) were 4.25 mm wide. The gun that was used by the German Navy had 36 parallel grooves and lands of 5 mm. Therefore, the gun shown in Vienna is still a 26 cm Ring Kanone L/20, but of a slightly different model.

=== Characteristics ===
In Spring 1875, the ballistic tables for the 26 cm RK L/20 were made. With the hardened grenade c/69 of 189.3 kg and a charge of 35 kg, the projectile attained a velocity of 436 m/s. With the long grenade c/75 of 172.5 kg and a charge of 30 kg, the projectile attained a velocity of 423 m/s. The table reached to 3,000 and 4,000 m. This also ended the development of the 26 cm RK L/20. It was then put into service.

The 26 cm RK L/20 as put into service had a caliber of 260 mm. The barrel had a total length of 5,200 mm, length of bore was 4,420 mm, 3,250 mm of the barrel was rifled. The chamber was not rifled. At the muzzle, 36 parallel grooves were 17.66 mm wide. The grooves gave a constant twist of 50 calibers length. It weighed 18,000 kg.

== The late 26 cm RK L/20 (263 mm) ==
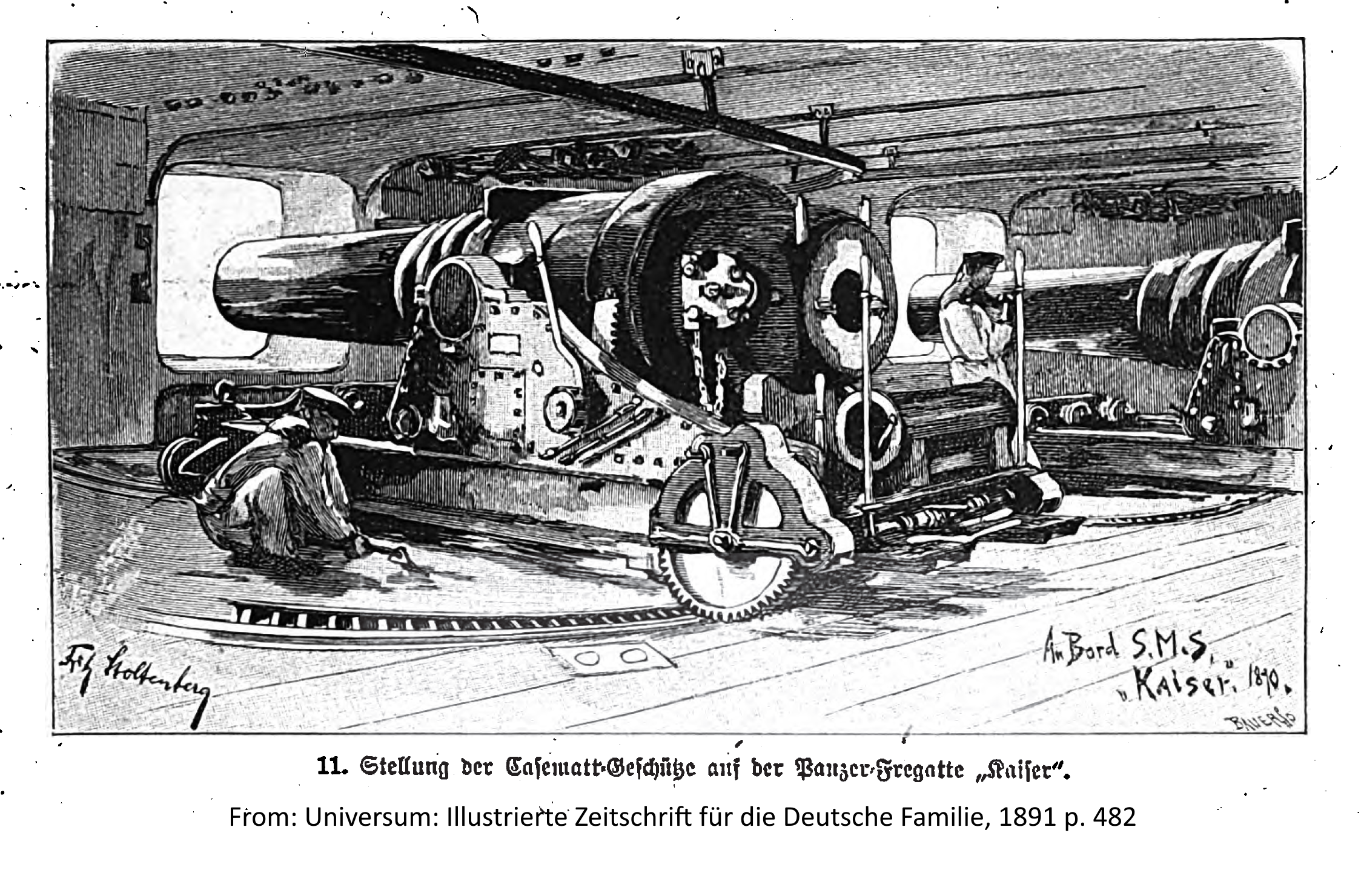
26 cm RK L/20 in the battery of SMS Kaiser, 1890

In the Summer of 1874, the Artillery Test Commission tested a 17 cm gun with a rifled chamber (Geschossraum) and copper driving bands. This resulted in a strong increase in accuracy as well as an increase in velocity of about 10 m/s. Meanwhile, the use of shallower grooves came into play.

Meanwhile, the matter of the nature of the driving bands came up again. In July 1875 the Artillery Test Commission declared that for the 26, 28, and 30.5 cm calibers, copper driving bands should be used.

In order to test these improvements, a long and a short 26 cm gun were adapted. In early 1876 the short 26 cm barrel No. 25 was bored up to 262.5 mm with a groove depth of 1.95 mm and got a rifled chamber. In Summer 1876 it attained positive results for accuracy. These tests were successfully repeated in 1877 and so the admiralty decided to change the short 26 cm gun along these lines in Fall 1877. However, the change could not be done yet, because the guns were on board ships that were in service.

By 1885, there were 5 kinds of 26 cm projectiles in the German Navy: 26 cm Granate C/75 aptirt, 26 cm Granate L/2,6, 26 cm Hartgussgranate C/69 aptirt, 26 cm Hartgussgranate L/2,5, 26 cm Stahlgranate L/2,5. All three kinds of 26 cm guns then in service with the navy, i.e. the 26 cm MRK L/22, the 26 cm RK L/22, and the 26 cm RK L/20, could fire all these projectiles, albeit with lighter charges for the L/20.

The change of the 26 cm L/20 was certainly successful. With the later gunpowder P.P. C/82, the gun could use a charge of 57 kg. It then fired the long grenade L/2,6 of 162 kg with a velocity of 500 m/s. The steel grenade L/2,5 attained a velocity of 481 m/s.

== Use ==
=== German Navy ===
In Germany, the 26 cm RK L/20 was used on board the Kaiser-class ironclads. The two ships of this class each had 8 26 cm RK L/20 placed in a central battery.
