= East Asia Squadron =

Division of the Imperial German Navy in the Pacific Ocean (1890s-1914)

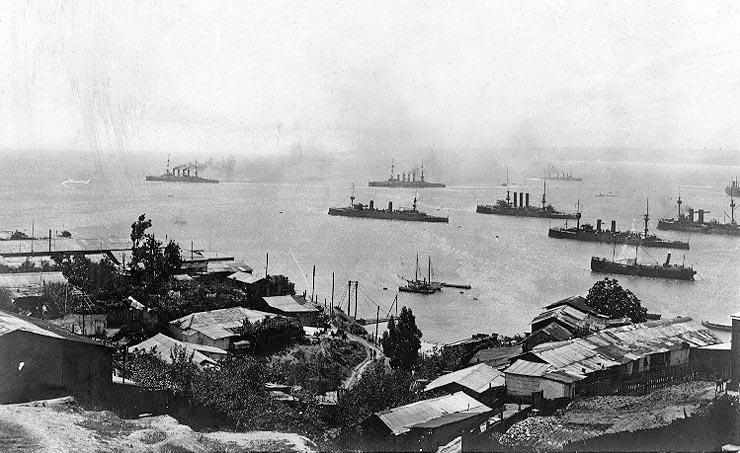
The East Asia Squadron (in the rear, under steam) leaving Valparaíso harbour in Chile, with Chilean Navy cruisers in the foreground

The German East Asia Squadron (German: Kreuzergeschwader / Ostasiengeschwader) was an Imperial German Navy cruiser squadron which operated mainly in the Pacific Ocean between the mid-1890s until 1914, when it was destroyed at the Battle of the Falkland Islands. It was based at Germany's Kiautschou Bay Leased Territory in China.

== Background ==
The Treaty of Peking of September 1861 between the Kingdom of Prussia and China allowed Prussian warships to operate in Chinese waters. As East Asia grew in economic and political importance to the recently united Germany, in 1881, a flying squadron was formed for the area under the command of a flag officer. Since African colonies were then seen as of greater value, an African Cruiser Squadron was established in 1885 with permanent status, and shortly thereafter the Imperial German Navy reduced the East Asia presence to two small gunboats.

From 1888 to 1892, Leipzig was flagship of the German East Asia Squadron, initially under Vice Admiral Karl August Deinhardt, appointed 14 July when the ship was in Aden and took command of the ship at Zanzibar on 2 August, and of the squadron 31 August at Manda-Bay (Kenya). The planned voyage to the South Sea was cancelled with the first signs of troubles in East Africa. As such she took part in the suppression of the Abushiri Revolt in German East Africa. On 8 May 1889 a landing party from the ship also took part in the storming of the Buschiri lager near Bagamojo. Another landing party from the ship took part in the capture of Pangani on 8 July 1889. After the end of the uprising, the ship put into Cape Town for an overhaul (August/September). In early September, Deinhardt received a telegram from Emperor Wilhelm II to report to his ship in the eastern Mediterranean.

The East Asia Division in the early 1890s; from left to right: Arcona, Marie, Irene, and Alexandrine

The ship entered the Mediterranean on 28 October and joined the training squadron off the island of Mitilini on 1 November. The emperor met Deinhardt on 6 November, who was returning from Constantinople, honored the members of the East African cruiser squadron with a special cabinet order. All the German vessels left for Italy and docked at Venice on November 12 to continue repairs interrupted at Cape Town. After 15 December, they departed for Malta waters then headed to Port Said, where Christmas and New Years was spent.

Sailing solo, Leipzig set out for the Far East on 27 January 1890, with SMS Carola, SMS Schwalbe, and SMS Sperber returned to East Africa, traveling only with gunboats Iltis and Wolf. The squadron's new commander Rear Admiral Victor Valois assumed command on 16 March. This was a routine period, including visits to Kotchin in India (20 March), traveled to Chinese and Japanese ports where Valois meet-up with his flagship at Nagasaki, From there they traveled to Hong Kong, and Manila to Singapore, where they meet up with SMS Sophie. They subsequently traveled in July through Indonesia, the Strait of Dampier, the Bismarck Archipelago, then to Newcastle, Sydney (15 September) and Jervis Bay in Australia. They were joined by SMS Alexandrine in Australia and after repairs to the Leipzig from damage that occurred in the Suez Canal, they traveled on to Samoa and New Zealand (November), and at the start of 1891 some visits to Hong Kong (14 February) and Chinese ports in March, running aground at Wusung-Road before its visit to Nanking.

In May 1891, at Yokohama, Valois was ordered to protect German interests in Chile against the Chilean Civil War. She ran out of coal on the way there and had to be towed for 97 hours. After stopping briefly in San Francisco, she traveled to Valparaiso arriving on 9 July. They traveled on to Iquique and Coquimbo during July and August. As the war came to a head, they returned to Valparaiso on 20 August and Leipzig and the British corvette HMS Champion sent a joint landing party to Valparaíso to protect the British and German quarters of the city. At the end of the Civil War, Leipzig visited various South American ports and then Cape Town. In March 1892, she anchored in Delagoa Bay, from which the Cruiser Squadron's new commander Friedrich von Pawelsz led a delegation to Paul Kruger, the new president of the South African Republic. The African Cruiser Squadron itself returned to Germany for deactivation at Kiel in 1893.

== Formation ==
With the outbreak of the First Sino-Japanese War in 1894, Germany revived her interest in China. With full support from Kaiser Wilhelm II, the German admiralty created an East Asia Cruiser Division (Kreuzerdivision in Ostasien) with the modern light cruiser SMS Irene and three aging small ships under the command of Rear Admiral Paul Hoffmann. "His orders directed him to protect German interests and to examine possible sites for a German base in China." Hoffmann found his ships lacking for the job and petitioned the admiralty for replacements for the three aging ships. His request was granted and the armored frigate SMS Kaiser, the light cruiser SMS Prinzess Wilhelm and the small cruiser SMS Cormoran were sent. But without a base, Hoffmann depended on the British at Hong Kong, the Chinese at Shanghai and the Japanese at Nagasaki for technical and logistical support of his ships. Wilhelm II, his chancellor, foreign minister and the naval secretary all saw the need for a base in East Asia; the German ambassador to China complained "... our ships cannot swim about here forever like homeless waifs."

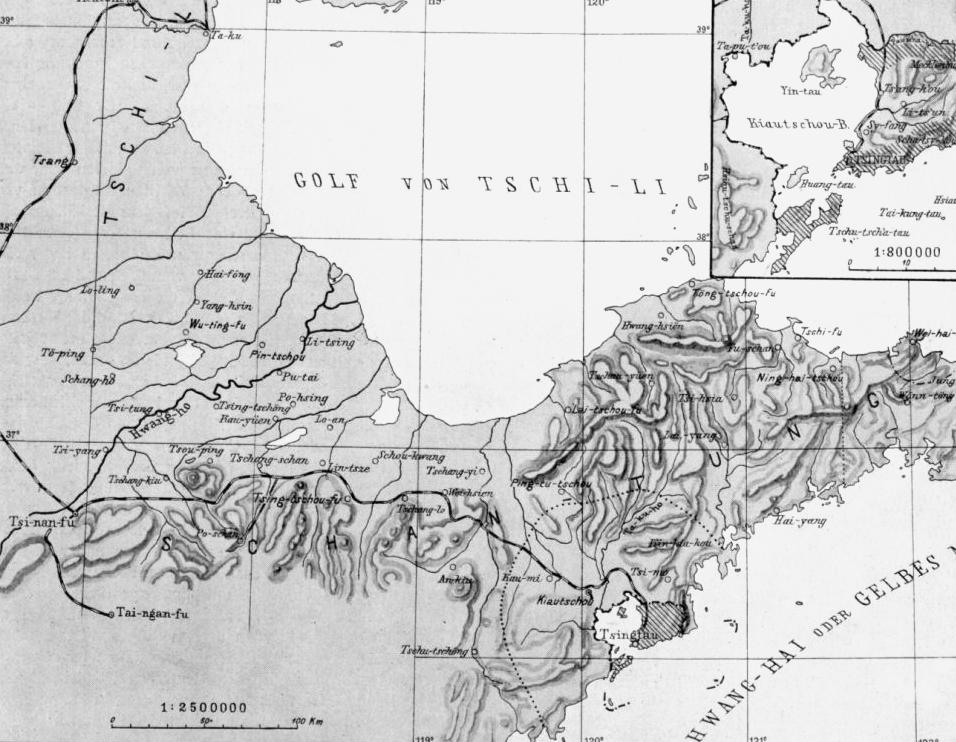
German 1912 map of the Shandong Peninsula showing the Kiautschou Bay Leased Territory

Rear Admiral Alfred von Tirpitz replaced Hoffmann in June 1896 with orders to find a site for a base and to evaluate four potential locales on the Chinese coast. Although Tirpitz favored the bay at Kiautschou, others in the government advocated for other sites, and even Tirpitz wavered on his commitment in his final report. Tirpitz was recalled by Wilhelm II, and after he returned to Berlin he lost interest in East Asia; he was now developing a battle fleet.

Rear Admiral Otto von Diederichs succeeded Tirpitz as commander of the Cruiser Division. Although the navy had not yet committed to a specific site for a base due to high-level indecision, Diederichs asserted "Kiautschou alone is the goal of my efforts."

=== Seizure of Tsingtao ===
German offers to buy the site were refused, but the murder of two German missionaries on 1 November 1897 in the Juye Incident provided the casus belli for Diederichs to land troops on 14 November 1897. The imperial navy had a rather tenuous hold on Jiaozhou until the region was reinforced by the arrival of the protected cruiser SMS Kaiserin Augusta and in January 1898 the marines of the Seebataillon disembarked to form the garrison for Tsingtao (now Qingdao).

With the convention at Peking on 6 March 1898, the German ambassador and Chinese viceroy signed a 99-year lease for Jiaozhou and colonization of the territory began in earnest. A naval base with a supporting, neighboring infrastructure (including the Tsingtao brewery) was then built at the impoverished fishing village of Tsingtao to create the Ostasiatische Station [East Asian Station] of the Imperial Navy.

Diederichs was recalled to Berlin in 1899 to serve as chief of the admiralty staff; he was succeeded at Tsingtao by Rear Admiral Prince Heinrich of Prussia. A series of other commanders of the East Asia Cruiser Squadron followed: Rear Admirals Curt von Prittwitz, Felix von Bendemann, Alfred Breusing, Carl Coerper, Friedrich von Ingenohl, Erich Gühler, Günther von Krosigk, and the fleet's last commanding officer, Maximilian von Spee. In these years a broad replacement and upgrade program provided for the assignment of modern ships to Tsingtao.

== Boxer Rebellion ==
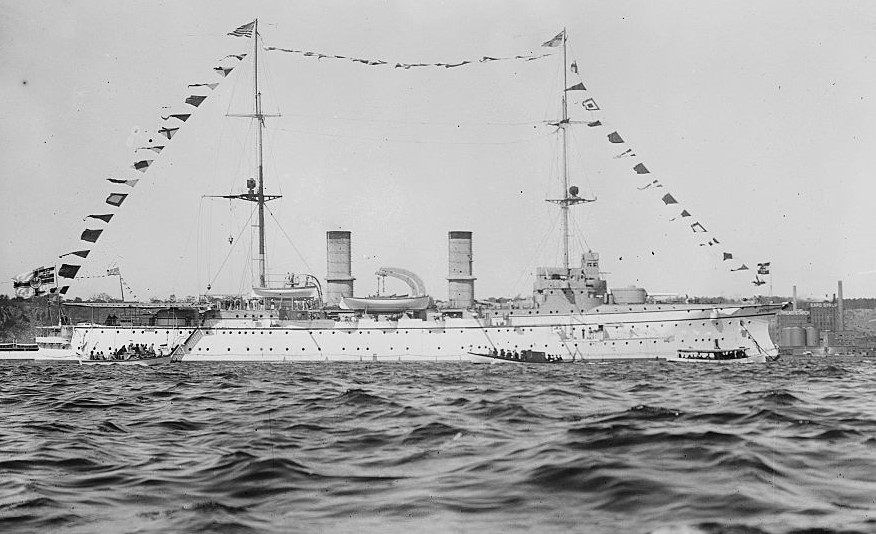
SMS Hertha with only two funnels as a training ship after her time in China

From February 1900 until 1902, Admiral Felix von Bendemann commanded the East Asia Squadron (Ostasiengeschwader) from his flagships SMS Irene, and then Hertha. When Bendemann took command of the East Asia Squadron, he found it unprepared for the challenges presented by the brewing Boxer Rebellion. He actually had to borrow charts from the Russians and maps from the British in order to operate in the Yellow Sea. Nevertheless, he forcefully advanced the idea of taking the Taku Forts and the ships under his command were able to make a noteworthy contribution in the Battle of Taku Forts (1900). On 8 June 1900, he brought the large cruisers SMS Hansa, SMS Hertha and the small cruisers SMS Gefion and SMS Irene before the Taku Forts (together with warships of other nations) to land detachments of marines (Seebatallione) for the protection of their citizens in Tientsin. Lieutenant Otto Weniger, the commander of SMS Gefion then became commander of a landing corps of 500 marines, which took part in the failed Seymour Expedition for the relief of the Peking delegations later in June.

== 1913 ==
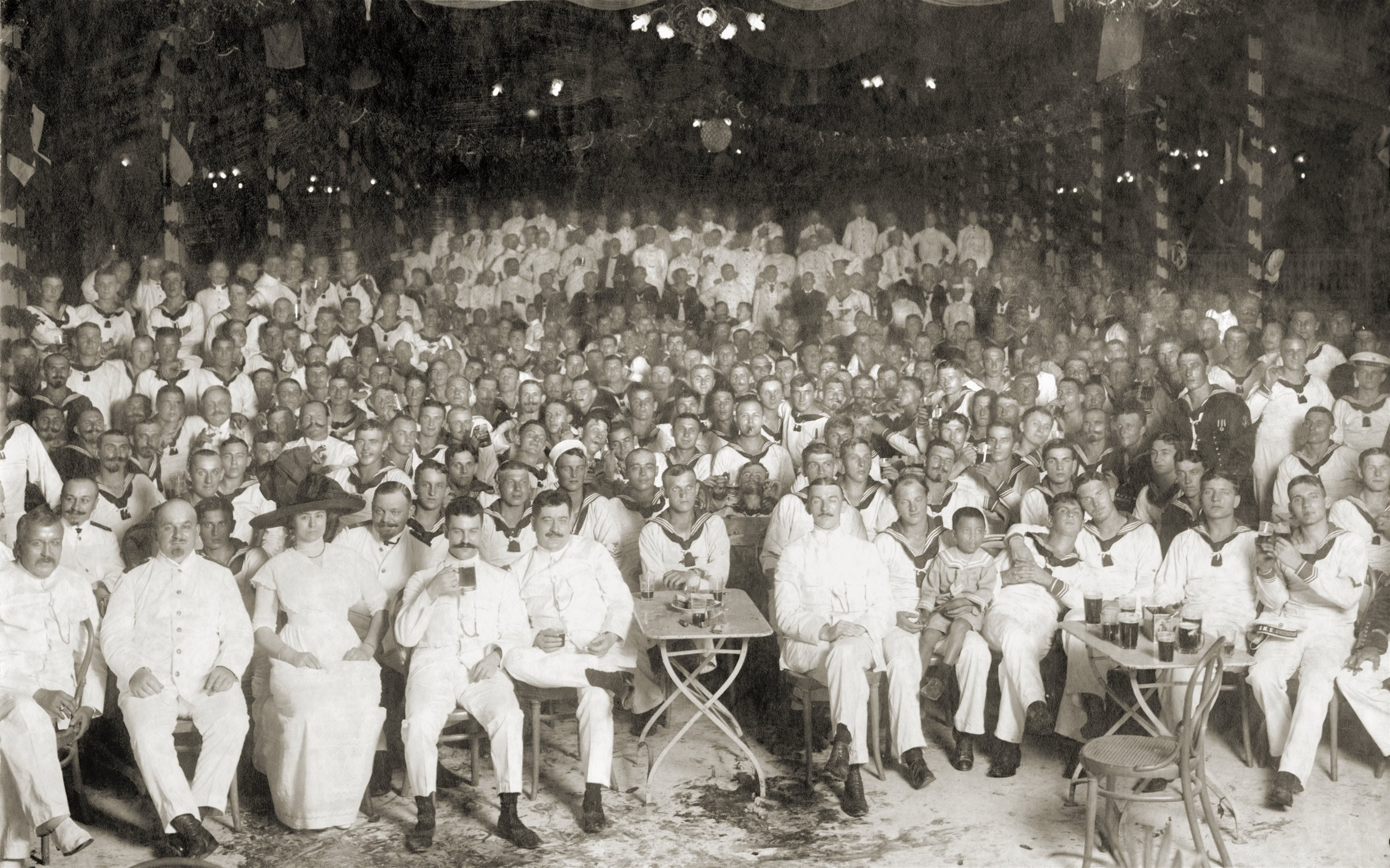
Men of the squadron ashore in Batavia on 27 January 1913

In January 1913, the squadron visited Batavia (now Jakarta), Indonesia.

== World War I ==
East Asia on the eve of World War I

In 1914, the East Asia Squadron numbered a total of five major warships under the command of Spee:

- Scharnhorst-class cruiser
  - SMS Scharnhorst
  - SMS Gneisenau
- Dresden-class cruiser
  - SMS Emden
- Bremen-class cruiser
  - SMS Leipzig
- Königsberg-class cruiser
  - SMS Nürnberg

Routes of the East Asian Squadron during the First World War

Also assigned to the squadron in 1914 were the old Bussard-class unprotected cruisers SMS Geier and Cormoran, torpedo boats SMS S90 and SMS Taku, and a variety of gunboats.

At the outbreak of World War I in August 1914, Spee found himself both outnumbered and outgunned by Allied navies in the region. He was especially wary of the Imperial Japanese Navy and the Royal Australian Navy — in fact he described the latter's flagship, the battlecruiser HMAS Australia, as being superior to his entire force by itself.

Spee said of his predicament: "I am quite homeless. I cannot reach Germany. We possess no other secure harbor. I must plough the seas of the world doing as much mischief as I can, until my ammunition is exhausted, or a foe far superior in power succeeds in catching me."

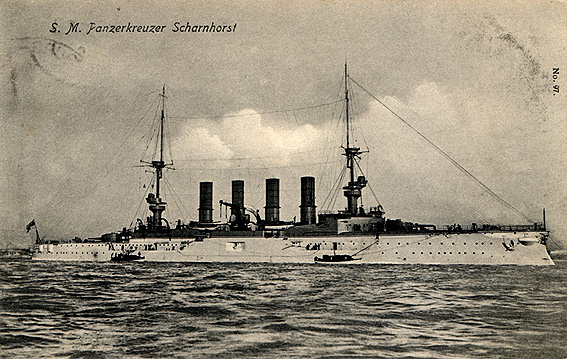
Scharnhorst (prewar postcard)

The initial successes by Emden led to Spee allowing her captain, von Muller, to take his ship on a lone commerce-raiding campaign in the Indian Ocean, while the cruisers of the squadron would head towards the eastern Pacific and the South American coast, where there were neutral countries with pro-German sympathies (notably Chile) where Spee could potentially obtain supplies. The cruiser Cormoran was left behind due to the poor state of her engines, which had led her to be stripped to outfit the captured Russian vessel Ryazan as a commerce raider renamed SMS Cormoran.

=== Raids by Emden ===
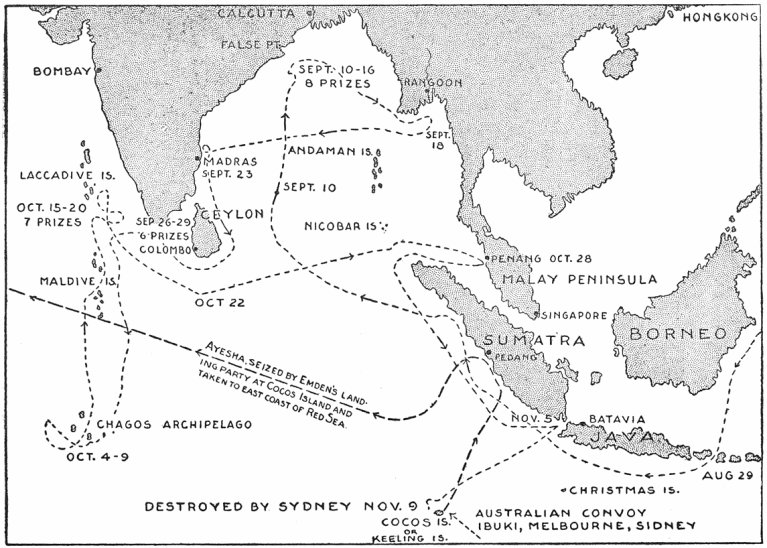
Route taken by SMS Emden during commerce raiding operations

Emden disrupted trade throughout the Indian Ocean, intercepting 29 ships and sinking those belonging to Britain or its allies. At the Battle of Penang she sank the Russian protected cruiser Zhemchug and the French destroyer Mousquet, catching the Russian ship by surprise while in harbor. At Madras she destroyed oil-storage facilities through shelling. The ship finally met its end on 9 November 1914 after a prolonged struggle with HMAS Sydney at the Battle of Cocos.

=== Sailing the Pacific ===
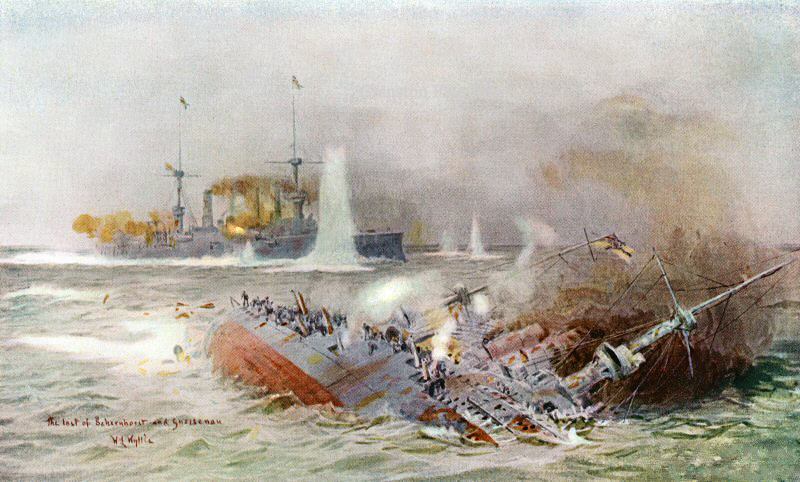
The Battle of the Falkland Islands was a crushing defeat for the East Asia Squadron.

At the outbreak of World War I, nearly all the ships of the East Asia Station were dispersed at various island colonies on routine missions; the armored cruisers Scharnhorst and Gneisenau were at anchor at Ponape in the Carolines. The fleet then rendezvoused at Pagan Island in the northern Marianas – the commanders planning the logistics of their long journey to Germany, with the ships coaling. The light cruiser Nürnberg was dispatched to Honolulu in the United States Territory of Hawaii to gather war news since all German undersea cables through British controlled areas were cut. Spee headed for German Samoa with Scharnhorst and Gneisenau, then east, conducting the Bombardment of Papeete in French Polynesia. The East Asia Squadron coaled at Easter Island from colliers that had been on station throughout the Pacific. The unprotected cruiser Geier, which had failed to rendezvous at Pagan, tried to join Spee's squadron until forced to intern itself at Hawaii on 17 October 1914 due to mechanical breakdowns. Realizing that Allied activity in the Pacific had increased to such a level that he was vastly outnumbered and losing the element of surprise, Spee decided to move his fleet around Cape Horn into the Atlantic and force his way north in an effort to reach Germany. While off the coast of Chile, the squadron met up with the light cruiser Dresden, which had been operating as a commerce raider in the Atlantic and had rounded Cape Horn in an effort to increase chances of success. At this point, Dresden joined Spee's flag and set out with the rest of the East Asia Squadron.

The main body of the squadron engaged the British 4th Cruiser Squadron on 1 November 1914 at the Battle of Coronel, sinking two British cruisers, HMS Good Hope and HMS Monmouth. It was while attempting to return home via the Atlantic that most of the squadron was destroyed on 8 December 1914 in the Battle of the Falkland Islands by a superior British force of battlecruisers and cruisers. SMS Dresden and a few auxiliary vessels escaped destruction and fled back to the Pacific, where the auxiliaries were interned at Chilean ports and Dresden was scuttled at the Battle of Más a Tierra.

Scharnhorst and Gneisenau's path across the Pacific Ocean

The four small gunboats Iltis, Jaguar, Tiger, Luchs and the torpedo boats SMS Taku and S90 of the East Asia Squadron that had been left at Tsingtao were scuttled by their crews just prior to the capture of the base by Japan in November 1914, during the Siege of Tsingtao. Four small river gunboats and some two dozen merchantmen and small vessels evaded Allied capture in inland waters of China until 1917, when China seized most of them save for two river gunboats, which were destroyed by their crews.

== See also ==
- Imperial German Navy order of battle (1914)
