= List of ironclad warships of Germany =

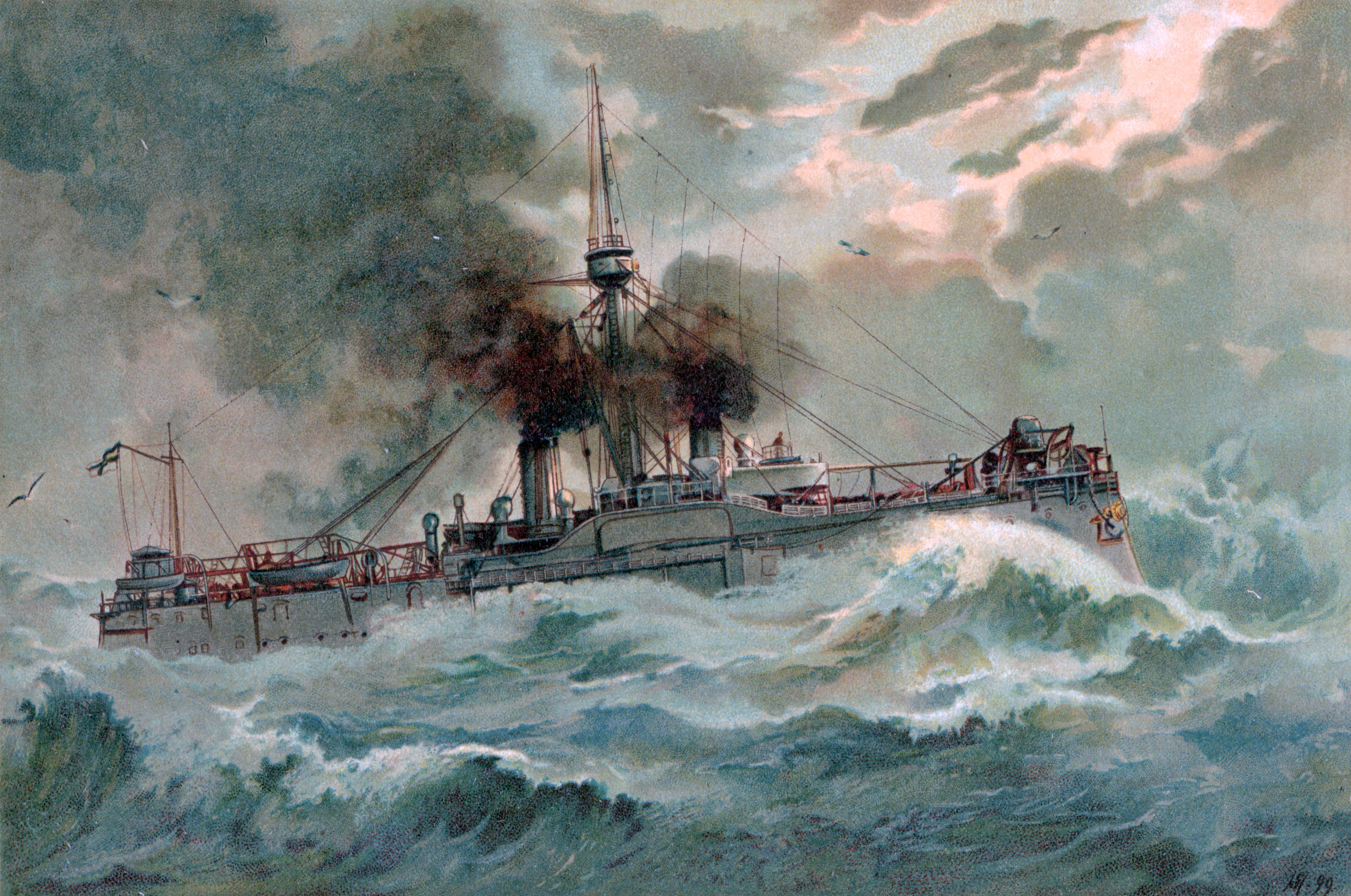
A 1902 lithograph of SMS Oldenburg, Germany's last ironclad

Between the mid-1860s and the early 1880s, the Prussian and later Imperial German Navies purchased or built sixteen ironclad warships. (Note: The Imperial Navy also acquired a number of armored gunboats, including the Rhein class of riverine monitors and the Wespe-class "flatiron gunboats." Despite their armor plating, they are not commonly described as ironclads. The term "ironclad" in this period frequently referred to armored capital ships that succeeded the sailing or steam-powered ship of the line and preceded pre-dreadnought battleships, though other historians have used the term more generally, especially in relation to the small armored ships operated by the US Navy during the American Civil War. Arminius and Prinz Adalbert were significantly smaller than later German ironclads, though they are typically included in lists of ironclad capital ships.) In 1860, however, the Prussian Navy consisted solely of wooden, unarmored warships. The following year, Prince Adalbert and Albrecht von Roon wrote an expanded fleet plan that included four large ironclads and four smaller ironclads. Two of the latter were to be ordered from Britain immediately, as German shipyards were at the time incapable of building such vessels. The rival Danish fleet had three ironclads in service by the time the Second Schleswig War broke out in 1864; as a result, Prussia purchased the ironclads Arminius and Prinz Adalbert, then under construction in Britain and France, respectively. The British, sympathetic to the Danish cause, delayed delivery of both Arminius and Prinz Adalbert until after the combined Austro-Prussian victory. Both ships entered service by 1865.

The Prussian Navy had acquired three more ships—Friedrich Carl, Kronprinz, and König Wilhelm—by the outbreak of the Franco-Prussian War in 1870. A fourth was ordered from Prussian shipbuilders, but would not be completed in time to see service during the war. In the aftermath of the war in 1871, the various Germanic states were unified under Prussian dominance as the German Empire; the Prussian Navy became the core of the Imperial Navy. The three turret ships of the Preussen class were built in Germany in the early 1870s, followed by two Kaiser-class vessels in the middle of the decade, the last capital ships ordered from foreign yards by Germany. A different strategic plan affected the next design, the four Sachsen-class ships. These vessels were intended to operate from fortified bases against a naval blockade, not on the high seas. The last ironclad built by Germany, Oldenburg, was originally to have been a fifth member of the Sachsen class, but dissatisfaction with those ships led to a new design. The German Navy temporarily ceased construction of capital ships in the 1880s, due to the poor performance of the Sachsen class and the rise of the Jeune École; instead, concentration was focused on creating a large force of torpedo boats for coastal defense. (Note: At the end of the decade, the German Navy returned to capital ship construction with a series of small coastal defence ships followed by ocean-going battleships.)

Key
Armament	The number and type of the primary armament
Armor	The maximum thickness of the armored belt
Displacement	Ship displacement at full combat load (Note: Historian Erich Gröner states that full load was defined as "[equal to] type displacement plus full load fuel oil, diesel oil, coal, reserve boiler feed water, aircraft fuel, and special equipment.")
Propulsion	Number of shafts, type of propulsion system, and top speed generated
Cost	Cost of the ship's construction
Service	The dates work began and finished on the ship and its ultimate fate
Laid down	The date the keel assembly commenced
Commissioned	The date the ship was commissioned

== Ships ==
=== SMS Arminius ===
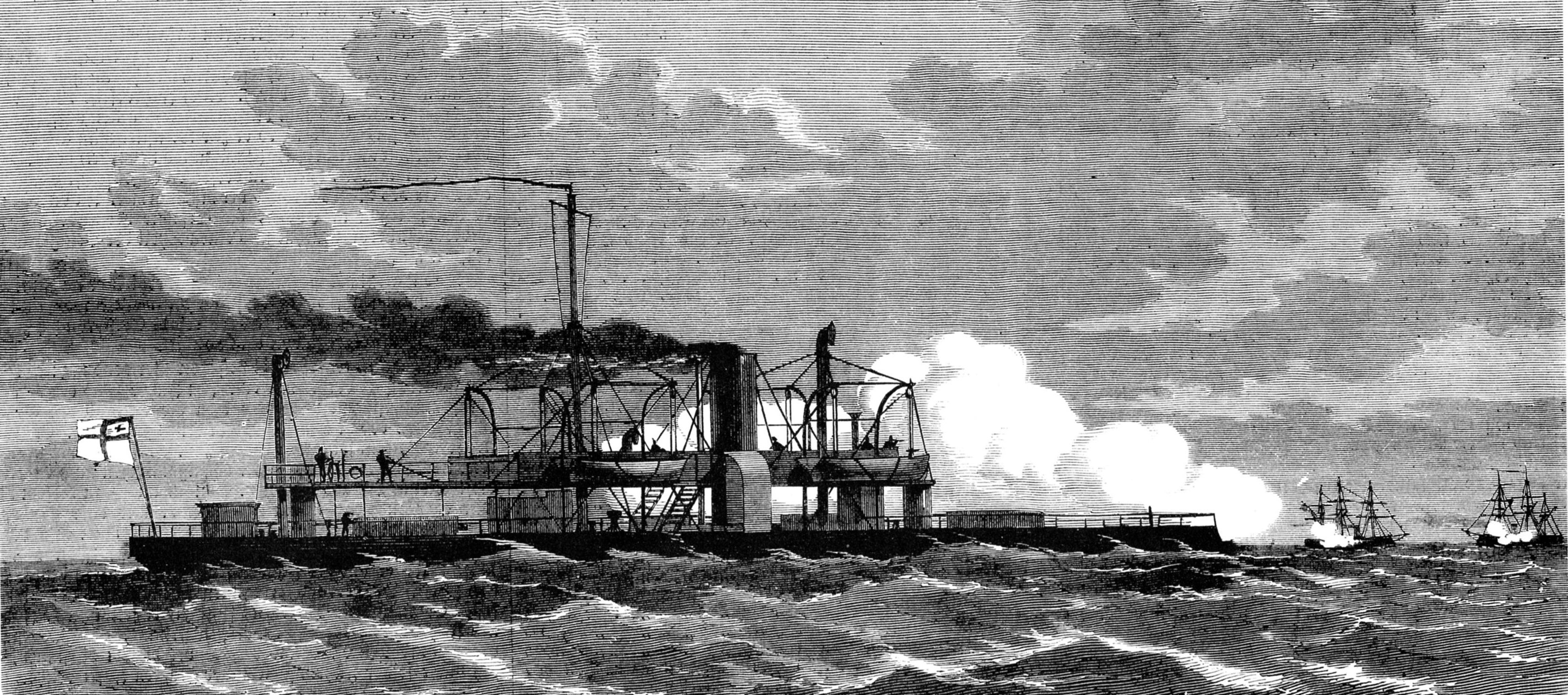
Illustration of SMS Arminius engaging French warships during the Franco-Prussian War

Arminius was an ironclad warship of the Prussian Navy, later the Imperial German Navy. The ship was designed by the British Captain Cowper Coles and built by the Samuda Brothers shipyard in London as a speculative effort; Prussia purchased the ship during the Second Schleswig War against Denmark, though the vessel was not delivered until after the war. The ship was the first German turret ship, armed with four 21 cm (8.3 in) guns in a pair of revolving gun turrets amidships.

Arminius served as a coastal defense ship for the first six years of her service with the Prussian Navy. She saw extensive service in the Austro-Prussian and Franco-Prussian wars during the process of German unification. The vessel was the primary challenge to the French blockade of German ports during the latter conflict. After the wars, Arminius was withdrawn from front-line service and used in a variety of secondary roles, including as a training ship for engine-room crews and as a tender for the school ship Blücher. The ship was eventually sold in 1901 and broken up for scrap the following year.

Summary of the Arminius class
Ship	Armament	Armor	Displacement	Propulsion	Cost	Service		
Ship	Armament	Armor	Displacement	Propulsion	Cost	Laid down	Commissioned	Fate
SMS Arminius	4 × 21 cm (8.3 in) guns	114 mm (4.5 in)	1,829 t (1,800 long tons)	1 shaft, 1 steam engine, 10 kn (19 km/h; 12 mph)	1,887,000 gold marks	1863	22 April 1865	Broken up in 1902

=== SMS Prinz Adalbert ===
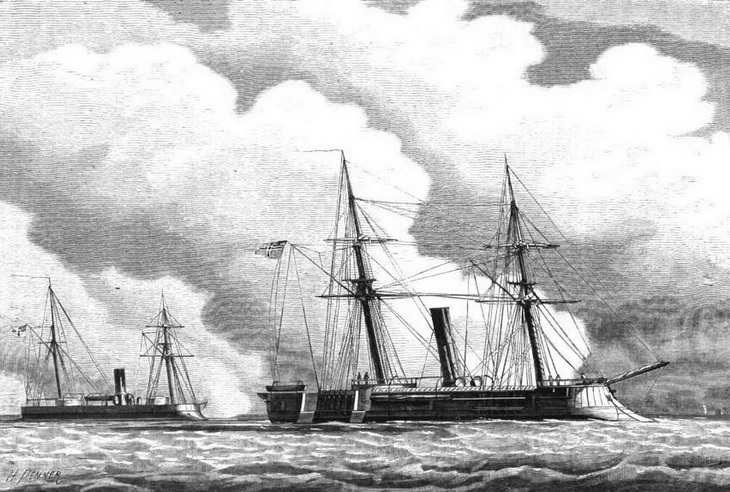
Prinz Adalbert (right) and Arminius (left)

Prinz Adalbert was originally ordered by the Confederate States Navy, but the Prussian Navy purchased the ship during the Second Schleswig War against Denmark. Like Arminius, the vessel was not delivered until after the war. The vessel was designed as an armored ram, but also carried three guns: one 21 cm and two 17 cm (6.7 in) pieces in fixed armored turrets. She was named after Prince Adalbert of Prussia, an early proponent of German naval power. The ship was poorly constructed and as a result had a very limited service career. She was heavily modified after her delivery to Prussia in 1865 and briefly served with the fleet between 1866 and 1871. During the Franco-Prussian War in 1870–1871, the ship was assigned as a guard ship in Hamburg. After the war, it was discovered that the internal wood construction was badly rotted; she was therefore removed from service in October 1871. Prinz Adalbert was stricken from the naval register in May 1878 and broken up for scrap that year.

Summary of the Prinz Adalbert class
Ship	Armament	Armor	Displacement	Propulsion	Cost	Service		
Ship	Armament	Armor	Displacement	Propulsion	Cost	Laid down	Commissioned	Fate
SMS Prinz Adalbert	1 × 21 cm 2 × 17 cm (6.7 in)	127 mm (5.0 in)	1,560 t (1,540 long tons)	2 shafts, 2 steam engines, 9.5 kn (17.6 km/h; 10.9 mph)	1,863,000 gold marks	1863	1864	Broken up in 1878

=== SMS Friedrich Carl ===
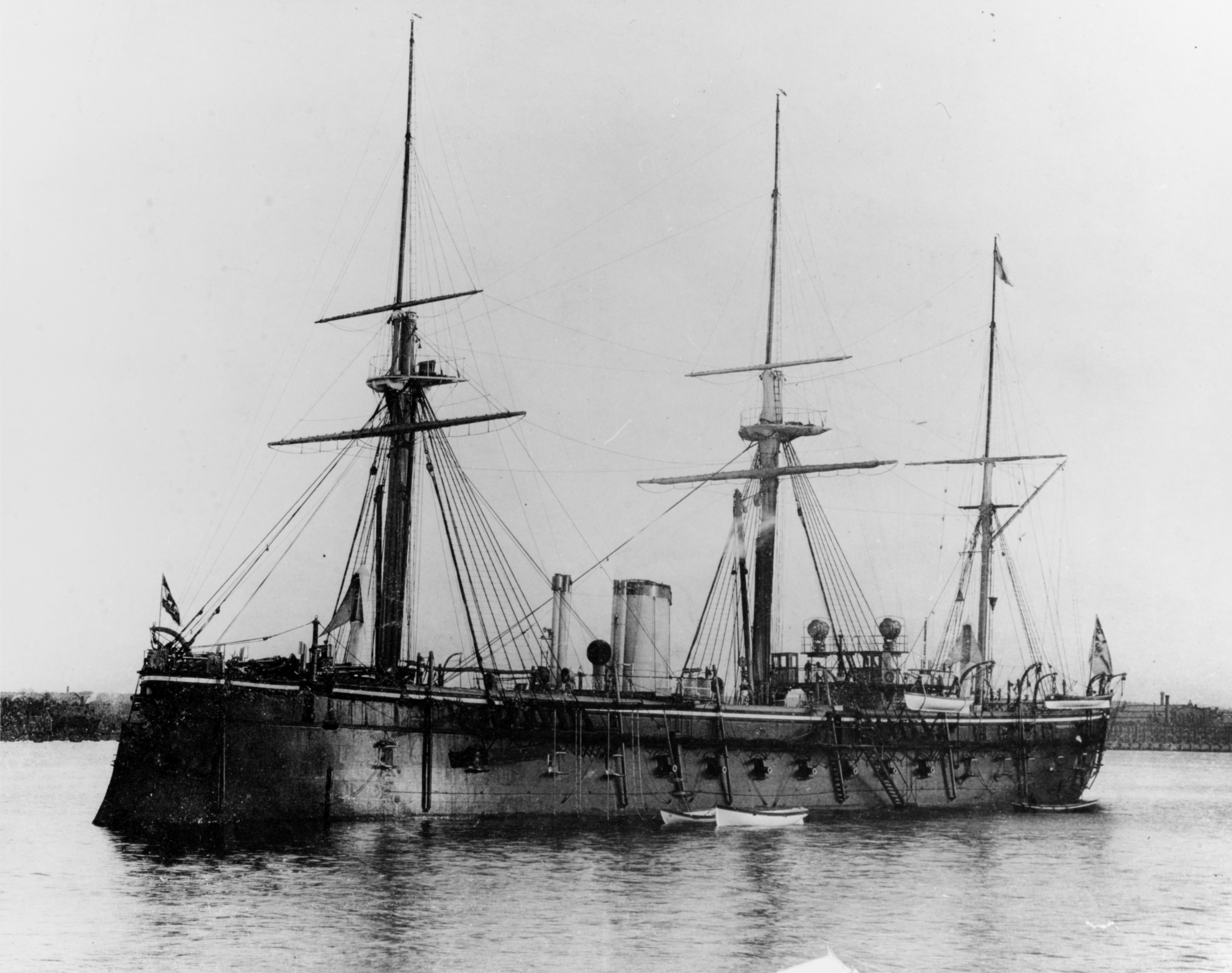
Friedrich Carl in the late 1880s or early 1890s

Friedrich Carl was built for the Prussian Navy in the mid-1860s in the French Societé Nouvelles des Forges et Chantiers shipyard in Toulon. Built as an armored frigate, she mounted her main battery of sixteen 21 cm guns on the broadside. Her hull was laid in 1866 and launched in January 1867. The ship was commissioned into the Prussian Navy in October 1867, after which she served with the fleet. During the Franco-Prussian War, the ship formed part of the main German squadron commanded by Vice Admiral Jachmann. Engine trouble, however, plagued the ship and two of the other three vessels in the squadron; as a result, they made only two sorties from the port of Wilhelmshaven to challenge the French blockade. Neither resulted in combat.

Friedrich Carl was also deployed to Spain during an insurrection in 1873, during which she assisted in the seizure of three rebel vessels in two engagements. The ship was refitted at the Imperial Dockyard in Wilhelmshaven during the 1880s. Friedrich Carl was withdrawn from active service in 1895, when she was converted into a training ship. She was renamed Neptun in 1902 and used as a harbor ship until June 1905, when she was removed from the naval register. The following year, she was sold to ship breakers in the Netherlands and dismantled for scrap.

Summary of the Friedrich Carl class
Ship	Armament	Armor	Displacement	Propulsion	Cost	Service		
Ship	Armament	Armor	Displacement	Propulsion	Cost	Laid down	Commissioned	Fate
SMS Friedrich Carl	16 × 21 cm	127 mm (5.0 in)	6,932 t (6,823 long tons)	1 shaft, 1 steam engine, 13.5 kn (25.0 km/h; 15.5 mph)	6,453,000 gold marks	1866	3 October 1867	Broken up in 1906

=== SMS Kronprinz ===
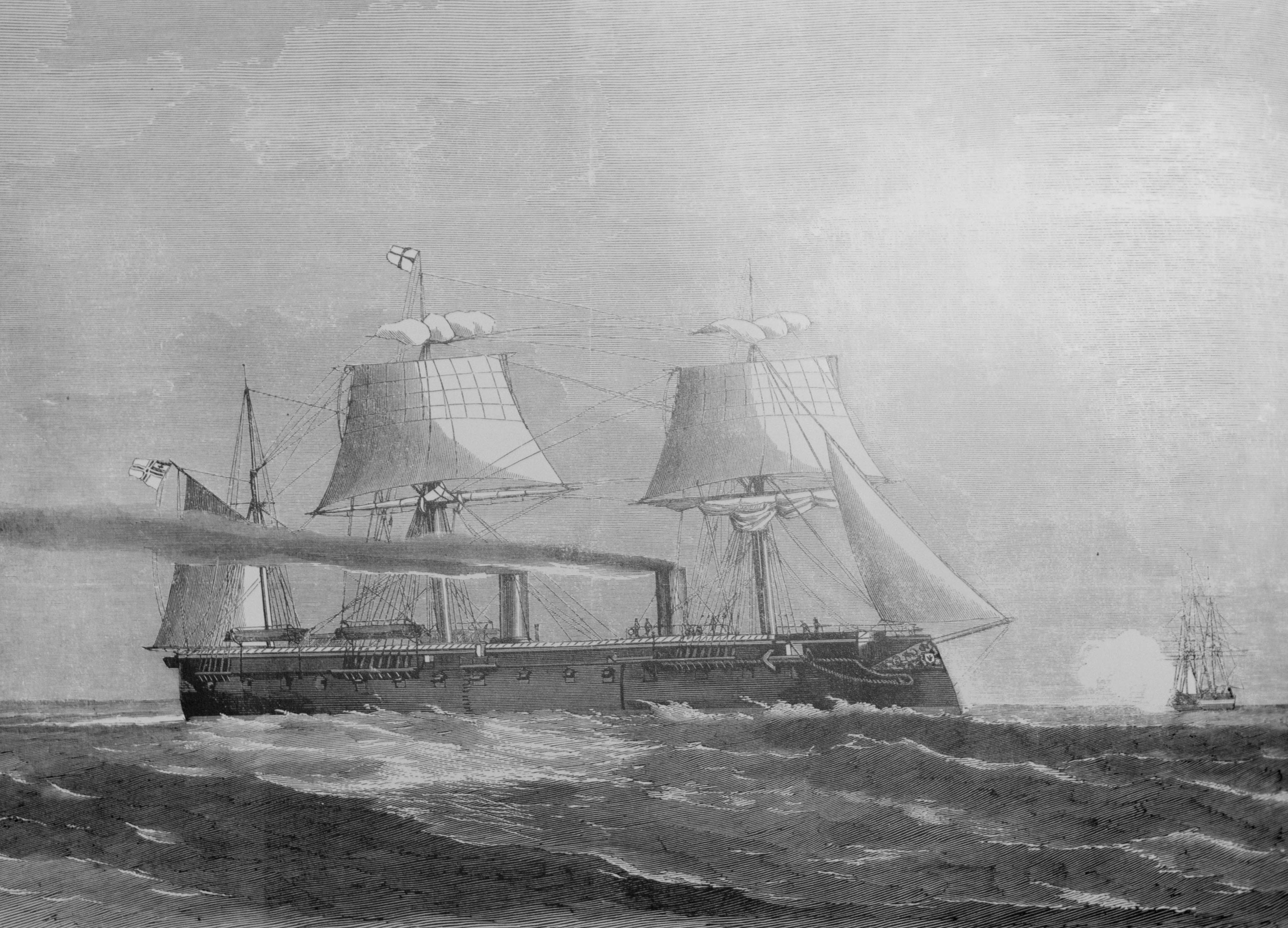
Illustration of Kronprinz in 1868

Kronprinz (Crown Prince) was built for the Prussian Navy in 1866–1867. The ship was laid down in 1866 at the Samuda Brothers shipyard at Cubitt Town in London. She was launched in May 1867 and commissioned into the Prussian Navy that September. The ship was the fourth ironclad ordered by the Prussian Navy, after Arminius, Prinz Adalbert, and Friedrich Carl, though she entered service before Friedrich Carl. Kronprinz was built as an armored frigate, armed with a main battery of sixteen 21 cm (8.3 in) guns; several smaller guns were added later in her career.

Kronprinz saw limited duty during the Franco-Prussian War. Engine troubles aboard the ship, along with the two other armored frigates in her squadron, prevented operations against the French blockade. The Prussians conducted only two sorties in which Kronprinz participated, both of which ended without combat. The ship served in the subsequent Imperial Navy until she was converted into a training ship for boiler room personnel in 1901. The ship was ultimately broken up for scrap in 1921.

Summary of the Kronprinz class
Ship	Armament	Armor	Displacement	Propulsion	Cost	Service		
Ship	Armament	Armor	Displacement	Propulsion	Cost	Laid down	Commissioned	Fate
SMS Kronprinz	16 × 21 cm	124 mm (4.9 in)	6,760 t (6,650 long tons)	1 shaft, 1 steam engine, 14.7 kn (27.2 km/h; 16.9 mph)	6,297,000 gold marks	1866	19 September 1867	Broken up in 1921

=== SMS König Wilhelm ===
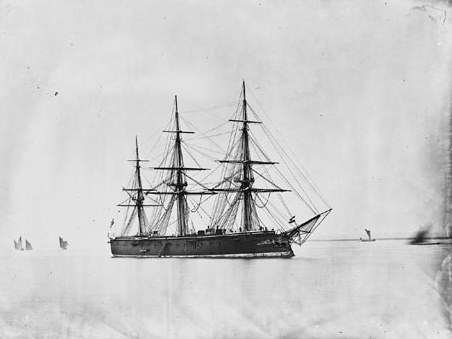
König Wilhelm in Gravesend, Great Britain

SMS König Wilhelm (King William) was laid down in 1865 at the Thames Ironworks shipyard in London, originally under the name Fatikh for the Ottoman Empire. She was purchased by Prussia in February 1867, launched in April 1868, and commissioned into the Prussian Navy in February 1869. She was built as an armored frigate, armed with a main battery of sixteen 24 cm (9.4 in) and five 21 cm guns; several smaller guns and torpedo tubes were added later in her career. The ship was for a time the largest and most powerful warship in the German navy, only surpassed in size by the Brandenburg-class pre-dreadnought battleships launched in 1891–1892.

She served as the fleet's flagship during the Franco-Prussian War in 1870–1871, though engine troubles prevented the ship from seeing action. In 1878, the ship accidentally rammed and sank the ironclad Grosser Kurfürst, with great loss of life. She returned to service to join maneuvers with the rest of the fleet in the early 1890s. König Wilhelm was converted into an armored cruiser in 1895–1896. By early 1904, however, she had been superseded by newer vessels. In May of that year, she was placed out of active service and used as a floating barracks and training ship, a role she held through World War I. In 1921, the ship was ultimately broken up for scrap, after a career spanning 52 years and three German states.

Summary of the König Wilhelm class
Ship	Armament	Armor	Displacement	Propulsion	Cost	Service		
Ship	Armament	Armor	Displacement	Propulsion	Cost	Laid down	Commissioned	Fate
SMS König Wilhelm	18 × 24 cm (9.4 in) guns	305 mm (12.0 in)	10,761 t (10,591 long tons)	1 shaft, 1 steam engine, 14.7 kn (27.2 km/h; 16.9 mph)	10,103,000 gold marks	1865	20 February 1869	Broken up in 1921

=== SMS Hansa ===
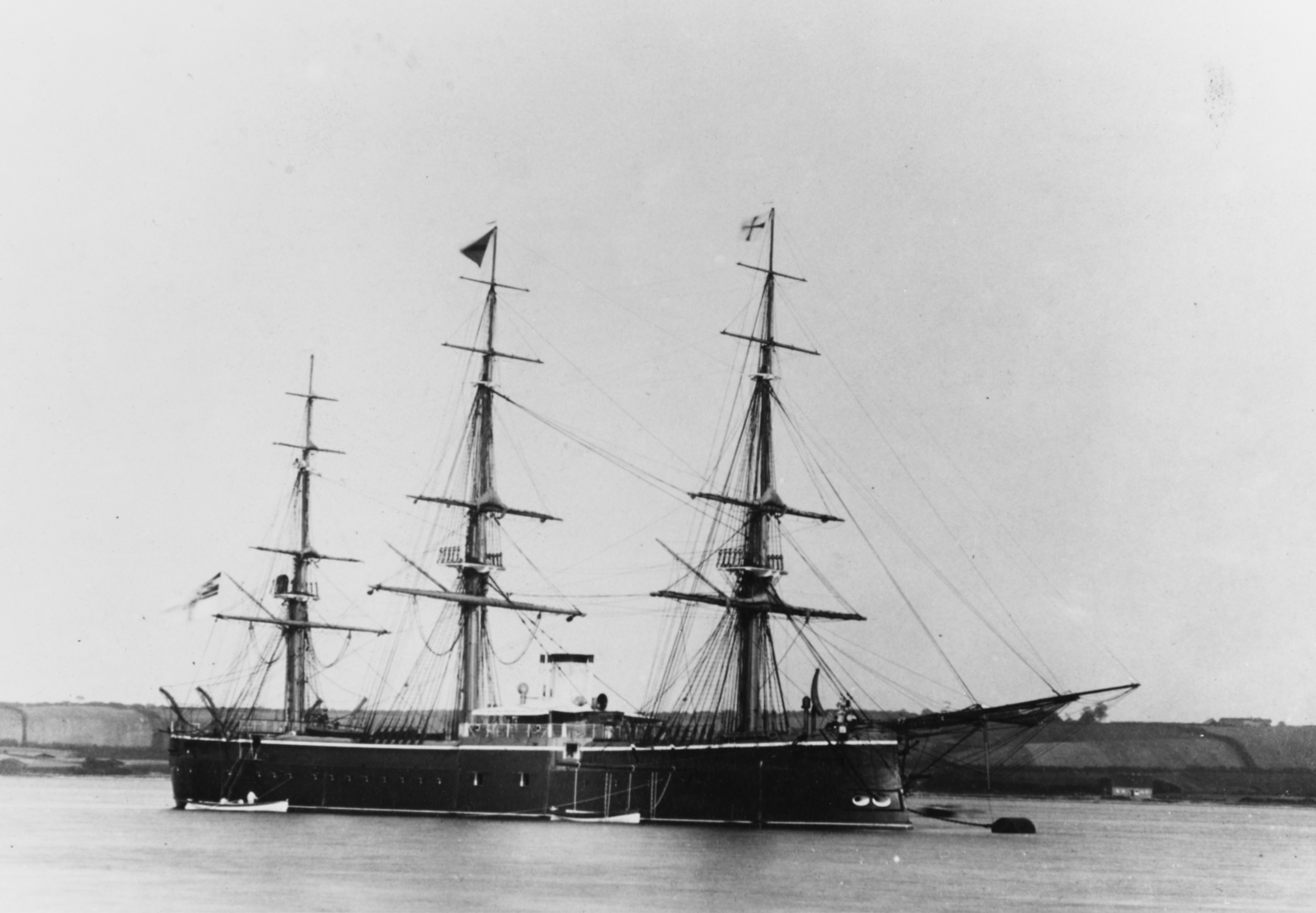
Hansa in Kiel in the 1880s

SMS Hansa was built in 1868–1875, the first ironclad built in Germany; all previous German ironclads had been built in foreign shipyards. This resulted in a much longer period of construction, however, as she was built by the relatively inexperienced Royal Dockyard in Danzig. She was named after the Hanseatic League, known in Germany simply as Hanse, Latinized Hansa. The ship was launched in October 1872 and commissioned into the Imperial Navy in May 1875. Designed for overseas service, Hansa was classed as an armored corvette and armed with eight 21 cm guns in a central battery.

Hansa served abroad for the first nine years of her career in the German navy. In 1884, it was found that her iron hull was badly corroded, which rendered the ship unfit for further active service. She was therefore removed from active duty and used for a variety of secondary roles. From 1884 to 1888, she served as a guard ship in Kiel, where she also trained engine and boiler room personnel. In 1888, she was stricken from the naval register and used as a barracks ship in Kiel. She was moved to Mönkeberg in 1905, where she continued to train boiler room personnel, until 1906 when she was sold to ship-breakers and dismantled for scrap.

Summary of the Hansa class
Ship	Armament	Armor	Displacement	Propulsion	Cost	Service		
Ship	Armament	Armor	Displacement	Propulsion	Cost	Laid down	Commissioned	Fate
SMS Hansa	8 × 21 cm guns	152 mm (6.0 in)	4,404 t (4,334 long tons)	1 shaft, 1 steam engine, 12.7 kn (23.5 km/h; 14.6 mph)	3,665,000 gold marks	1868	19 May 1875	Broken up 1906

=== Preussen class ===
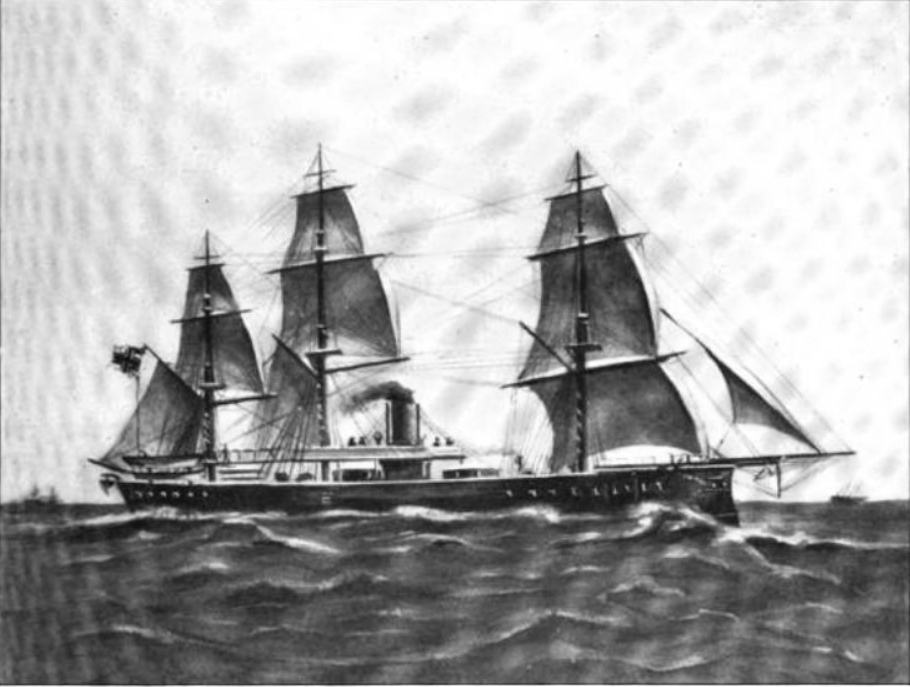
Grosser Kurfürst under sail

The Preussen class of armored frigates was a group of three ships built in the early 1870s. The lead ship, Preussen, was laid down in 1871 and launched in 1873. Friedrich der Grosse also was laid down in 1871 and launched in 1874. Grosser Kurfürst, although the first to be laid down, in 1869, was the last to be completed, launched in 1875. This was primarily due to the fact that Preussen was built by a private firm experienced with building large ships, while Friedrich der Grosse and Grosser Kurfürst were constructed by newly established and thus inexperienced Imperial dockyards. The ships served in the fleet starting in 1876, when Preussen was commissioned.

Grosser Kurfürst was lost in 1878 during maneuvers shortly after her commissioning, when a pair of small sailing boats crossed the bows of Grosser Kurfürst and König Wilhelm, which caused both ships to undertake emergency maneuvers. In the confusion, König Wilhelm collided with Grosser Kurfürst, causing the latter to sink. Over two hundred men were killed in the sinking, which resulted in tremendous political infighting in the Navy and the eventual forced retirement of Admiral Reinhold von Werner. Both Preussen and Friedrich der Grosse served in the fleet until the 1890s, when they were relegated to secondary duties, including serving as harbor ships, and later as coal hulks. The ships were eventually scrapped following the end of World War I, in 1919 and 1920, respectively.

Summary of the Preussen class
Ship	Armament	Armor	Displacement	Propulsion	Cost	Service		
Ship	Armament	Armor	Displacement	Propulsion	Cost	Laid down	Commissioned	Fate
SMS Preussen	4 × 26 cm (10 in) guns	203 mm (8.0 in)	7,718 t (7,596 long tons)	1 shaft, 1 steam engine, 14 kn (26 km/h; 16 mph)	7,303,000 gold marks	1871	4 July 1876	Broken up in 1919
SMS Grosser Kurfürst	4 × 26 cm (10 in) guns	203 mm (8.0 in)	7,718 t (7,596 long tons)	1 shaft, 1 steam engine, 14 kn (26 km/h; 16 mph)	7,303,000 gold marks	1869	6 May 1878	Accidentally sunk, 31 May 1878
SMS Friedrich der Grosse	4 × 26 cm (10 in) guns	203 mm (8.0 in)	7,718 t (7,596 long tons)	1 shaft, 1 steam engine, 14 kn (26 km/h; 16 mph)	7,303,000 gold marks	1871	22 November 1877	Broken up in 1920

=== Kaiser class ===
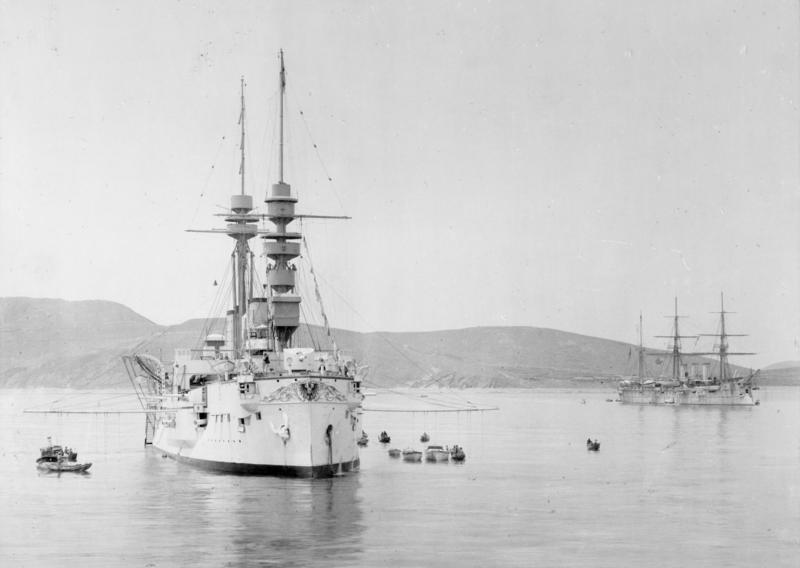
Deutschland in Qingdao

The Kaiser class was a pair of vessels built in the early 1870s. The lead ship, Kaiser, was laid down in 1871 and launched in 1874. Deutschland was laid down in 1872 and launched in 1874; both ships were designed by Edward Reed and were built by the Samuda Brothers shipyard in London. They were the last German capital ships built by a foreign shipyard. Built as armored frigates, the ships were armed with a main battery of eight 26 cm (10 in) guns in a central armored battery and were capable of a top speed of 14 kn (26 km/h; 16 mph).

Both ships served with the fleet following their commissioning in 1875, though they spent a significant part of their career in reserve, as Germany maintained only a small number of ships on active duty for training cruises in the period. The ships were substantially rebuilt in the 1890s into armored cruisers and stationed in Asia for three years. Kaiser was the flagship of Otto von Diederichs's East Asia Squadron during the seizure of the Jiaozhou Bay Leased Territory in November 1897. Both ships were sent to the Philippines after the Spanish–American War in 1898. Following their return to Germany in 1899–1900, the ships were used in several secondary roles, including as harbor and barracks ships. The ships were stricken from the naval register in 1906; Deutschland was used as a target ship before being sold for scrap in 1908, though Kaiser served on as a floating barracks until she too was sold in 1920.

Summary of the Kaiser class
Ship	Armament	Armor	Displacement	Propulsion	Cost	Service		
Ship	Armament	Armor	Displacement	Propulsion	Cost	Laid down	Commissioned	Fate
SMS Kaiser	8 × 26 cm	254 mm (10.0 in)	8,940 t (8,800 long tons)	1 shaft, 1 steam engine, 14.6 kn (27.0 km/h; 16.8 mph)	8,226,000 gold marks	1871	13 February 1875	Broken up in 1920
SMS Deutschland	8 × 26 cm	254 mm (10.0 in)	8,940 t (8,800 long tons)	1 shaft, 1 steam engine, 14.6 kn (27.0 km/h; 16.8 mph)	8,240,000 gold marks	1872	20 July 1875	Broken up in 1909

=== Sachsen class ===
1902 lithograph of Württemberg

The Sachsen class of four ships was built in the late 1870s to early 1880s. The ships—Sachsen, Bayern, Württemberg, and Baden—were designed to operate as part of an integrated coastal defense network. The ships were intended to sortie from fortified bases to break up an enemy blockade or landing attempt, and were labeled as Ausfallkorvetten (sortie corvettes) by the Imperial Navy. As a result of their intended roles, they were given a short cruising radius and were not intended for high-seas operations. Armed with six 26 cm guns, they were, however, intended to fight hostile ironclads on relatively equal terms.

Following their commissionings in 1878–1883, the four ships served with the fleet on numerous training exercises and cruises in the 1880s and 1890s. They also participated in several cruises escorting Kaiser Wilhelm II on state visits to Great Britain and to various cities in the Baltic Sea in the late 1880s and early 1890s. In the late 1890s, the four ships were extensively rebuilt; their secondary batteries were modernized and they received upgraded propulsion systems. They were removed from active duty between 1902 and 1910 and relegated to secondary duties. Sachsen and Bayern became target ships while Württemberg became a torpedo training ship. The three ships were broken up for scrap in 1919–1920. Baden was used as a boom defense hulk from 1910 to 1920, when she became a target ship. She survived until 1938, when she was sold for scrapping.

Summary of the Sachsen class
Ship	Armament	Armor	Displacement	Propulsion	Cost	Service		
Ship	Armament	Armor	Displacement	Propulsion	Cost	Laid down	Commissioned	Fate
SMS Sachsen	6 × 26 cm guns	254 mm (10.0 in)	7,935 t (7,810 long tons)	2 shafts, 2 steam engines, 13.6 kn (25.2 km/h; 15.7 mph)	— (Note: The cost of the ship is not recorded in Gröner's work.)	1875	20 October 1878	Broken up in 1919
SMS Bayern	6 × 26 cm guns	254 mm (10.0 in)	7,935 t (7,810 long tons)	2 shafts, 2 steam engines, 13.6 kn (25.2 km/h; 15.7 mph)	9,133,000 gold marks	1874	4 August 1881	Broken up in 1919
SMS Württemberg	6 × 26 cm guns	254 mm (10.0 in)	7,935 t (7,810 long tons)	2 shafts, 2 steam engines, 13.6 kn (25.2 km/h; 15.7 mph)	8,325,000 gold marks	1876	9 May 1881	Broken up in 1920
SMS Baden	6 × 26 cm guns	254 mm (10.0 in)	7,935 t (7,810 long tons)	2 shafts, 2 steam engines, 13.6 kn (25.2 km/h; 15.7 mph)	8,534,000 gold marks	1876	24 September 1883	Broken up in 1939–1940

=== SMS Oldenburg ===
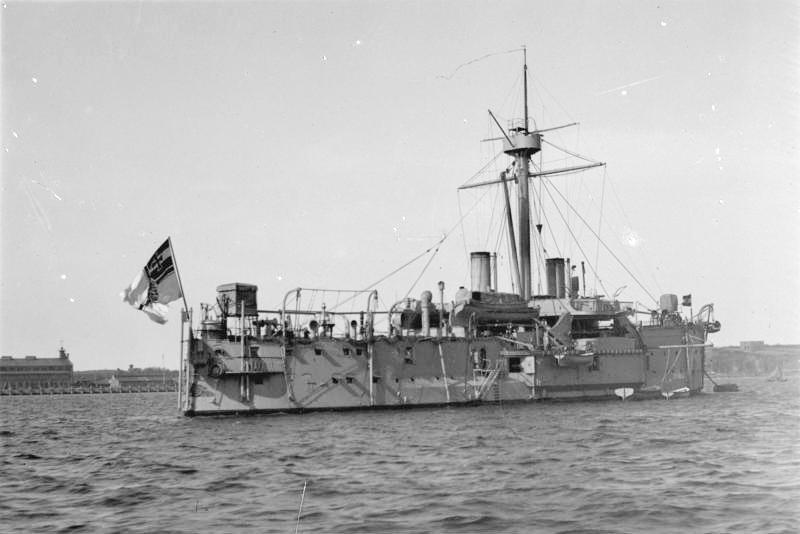
Oldenburg in port

SMS Oldenburg was laid down at the AG Vulcan shipyard in Stettin in 1883, launched in December 1884 and commissioned into the Navy in April 1886. Oldenburg was intended to have been a fifth member of the Sachsen class, but budgetary limitations and dissatisfaction with the ships of the Sachsen class prompted a redesign that bore little resemblance to the earlier vessels. Oldenburg mounted her main battery of eight 24 cm guns amidships, six in a central casemate on the main deck and two directly above them on the broadside. She was the first German capital ship constructed entirely from German-made steel.

Oldenburg did not see significant service with the German Navy. She participated in fleet training maneuvers in the late 1880s and early 1890s, but she spent the majority of the 1890s in reserve. Her only major deployment came in 1897–1898 when she joined an international naval demonstration to protest the Greek annexation of Crete; the demonstration ultimately forced a compromise between the Greeks and Ottomans. In 1900, she was withdrawn from active duty and used as a harbor defense ship. From 1912 to 1919, she was used by the High Seas Fleet as a target ship; she was sold for scrapping in 1919 and broken up that year.

Summary of the Oldenburg class
Ship	Armament	Armor	Displacement	Propulsion	Cost	Service		
Ship	Armament	Armor	Displacement	Propulsion	Cost	Laid down	Commissioned	Fate
SMS Oldenburg	8 × 24 cm guns	300 mm (12 in)	5,743 t (5,652 long tons)	2 shafts, 2 steam engines, 13.8 kn (25.6 km/h; 15.9 mph)	8,885,000 gold marks	1883	8 April 1886	Broken up in 1919

== See also ==
- List of ironclads
