= Japanese ironclad Kōtetsu =

First ironclad warship of the Imperial Japanese Navy

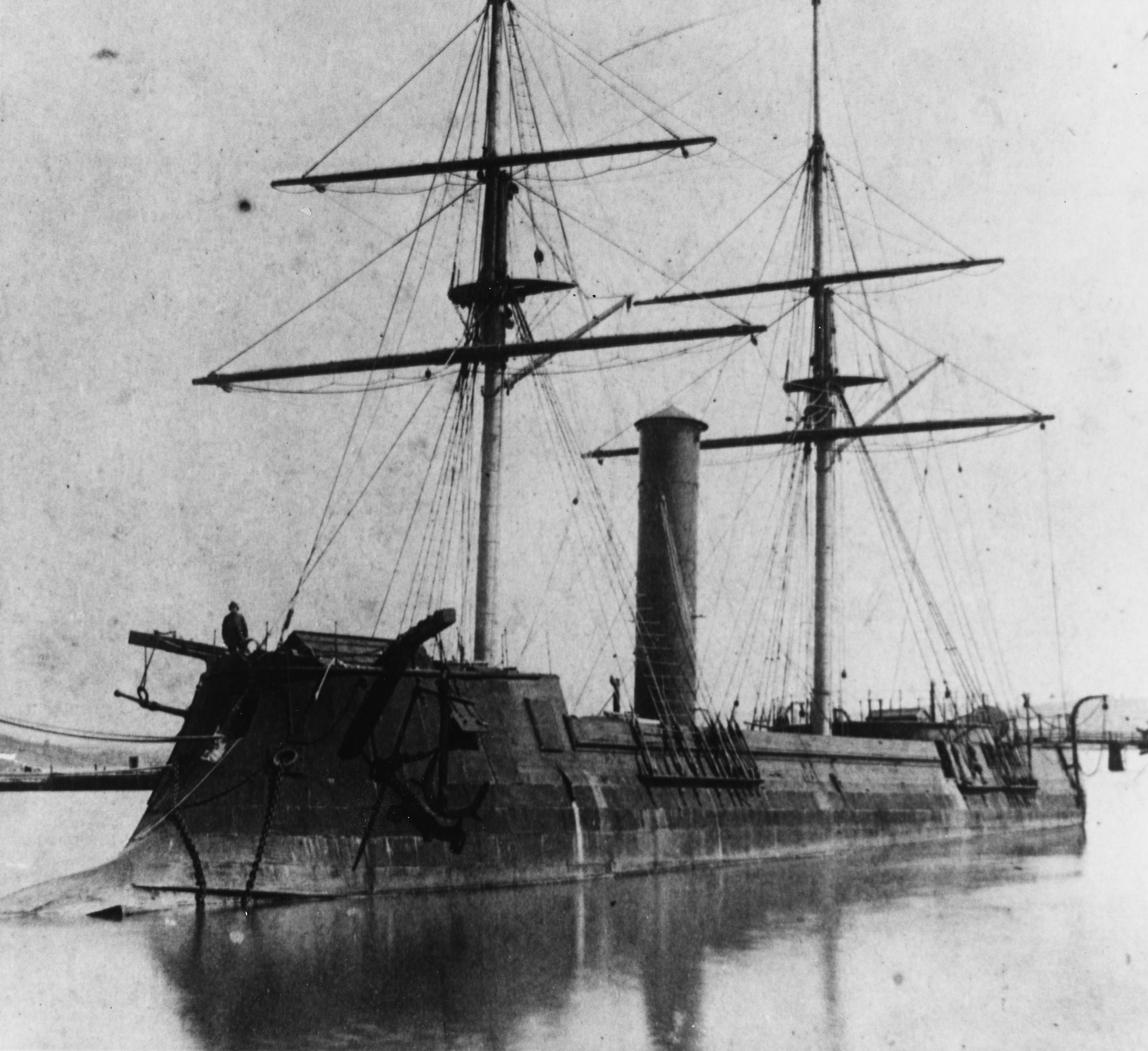
- Kōtetsu, Japan's first ironclad warship, as CSS Stonewall c. 1865

History

Confederate States of America
- Name: Stonewall
- Namesake: General Stonewall Jackson
- Builder: Chantiers Arman
- Laid down: 1863
- Launched: 21 June 1864
- Completed: January 1865
- Fate: Turned over to the United States, May 1865

Empire of Japan
- Name: Kōtetsu
- Acquired: 3 February 1869 from the United States
- Decommissioned: 28 January 1888
- Renamed: Azuma, 7 December 1871
- Fate: Sold for scrap, 12 December 1889

General characteristics
- Class & type: Ironclad ram
- Displacement: 1,390 long tons (1,410 t)
- Length: 186 ft 9 in (56.9 m) (o/a)
- Beam: 32 ft 6 in (9.9 m)
- Draft: 14 ft 3 in (4.3 m)
- Installed power: 2 boilers; 1,200 ihp (890 kW)
- Propulsion: 2 shafts; 2 direct-acting steam engines
- Sail plan: Brig rigged
- Speed: 10.5 knots (19.4 km/h; 12.1 mph)
- Range: 3,000 nmi (5,600 km; 3,500 mi)
- Complement: 135
- Armament: 1 × 300 pdr (10 in (254 mm)) rifled muzzle-loading (RML) gun; 2 × 70 pdr (6.4 in (163 mm)) RML guns
- Armor: Waterline belt: 4.5 in (114 mm); Turrets: 5.5 in (140 mm)

Kōtetsu (甲鉄; literally "Ironclad"), later renamed Azuma (東; "East"), was the first ironclad warship of the Imperial Japanese Navy. She was designed as an armored ram for service in shallow waters, but also carried three guns. The ship was built in Bordeaux, France, for the Confederate States Navy under the cover name Sphinx, but was sold to Denmark after the sale of warships by French builders to the Confederacy was forbidden in 1863. The Danes refused to accept the ship and sold her to the Confederates which commissioned her as CSS Stonewall in 1865. The ship did not reach Confederate waters before the end of the American Civil War in April and was turned over to the United States.

The Tokugawa shogunate of Japan bought her from the United States in 1867 and renamed her Kōtetsu, but delivery was held up by the Americans until after the Imperial faction had established control over most of the country. She was finally delivered in March 1869 to the new government and had a decisive role in the Naval Battle of Hakodate Bay in May, which marked the end of the Boshin War, and the completion of the military phase of the Meiji Restoration.

Renamed Azuma in 1871, she played minor roles in the Saga Rebellion and the Taiwan Expedition, both in 1874. The ship ran aground later that year, but was refloated and repaired. During the Satsuma Rebellion three years later, she was little used. Azuma was stricken in 1888 and was sold for scrap the following year.

== Description ==
Sphinx was 165 feet 9 inches (50.5 m) long between perpendiculars and had an overall length of 186 feet 9 inches (56.9 m) including her prominent pointed naval ram. The ship had a beam of 32 feet 6 inches (9.9 m) and a draught of 14 feet 3 inches (4.3 m). (Note: Published data for the ship's specifications vary considerably, but Silverstone and Canney are assumed to be the most accurate as the US Navy surveyed the ship after the war and have been used here.) The brig's composite hull was sheathed in copper to protect it from parasites and biofouling and it featured a pronounced tumblehome. She displaced 1,390 long tons (1,410 t) and her crew numbered 135 officers and crewmen. To improve her maneuverability the ship was fitted with twin rudders.

Her main battery consisted of a single 300-pounder 10-inch (254 mm) Armstrong rifled muzzle-loading (RML) gun located in the bow turret in a pivot mount. The fixed turret had three or five gun ports. A pair of 70-pounder 6.4-inch (163 mm) Armstrong RML guns were positioned in the oval fixed turret abaft the mainmast, one pivot mount on each broadside firing through two gun ports. The Japanese removed one of the 70-pounder guns and added a pair of Armstrong 6-pounder guns, four 4-pounder field guns and a Gatling gun.

The ship was designed to withstand hits by 15-inch (381 mm) guns. Her hull was protected by a wrought-iron armored belt that extended 2.12 meters (6 ft 11 in) below the waterline that was backed by about 15 inches of teak. The hull armor was 12 centimeters (4.7 in) amidships and tapered to 9 centimeters (3.5 in) towards the bow and stern. Above it was a strake of armor 76 millimeters (3 in) thick. The bow turret was protected with 4.5-inch-thick (114 mm) armor and the amidships turret was fitted with 4-inch (102 mm) armor plates.

The power plant consisted of a pair of Mazeline horizontal two-cylinder single-expansion steam engines, each driving a four-bladed, 3.6-metre (11 ft 10 in) screw using steam provided by two Mazeline tubular boilers. The engines were rated at a total of 1,200 PS (1,184 ihp). The ship reached a maximum speed of 10.8 knots (20.0 km/h; 12.4 mph) during her sea trials on 9 October 1864. She had an estimated range of 3,000 nautical miles (5,600 km; 3,500 mi) with a full load of 227 t (223 long tons) of coal. (Note: Watts states only 95 t (93 long tons) of coal.)

== Origins and career ==
In June 1863, John Slidell, the Confederate commissioner to France, asked Emperor Napoleon III in a private audience if it would be possible for the Confederate government to build ironclad warships in France. Arming ships of war for a recognized belligerent like the Confederate States would have been illegal under French law, but Slidell and his agent, James D. Bulloch, were confident that the Emperor of France would be able to circumvent his own laws more easily than other potential secret contractors. Napoleon III agreed to the building of ironclads in France on the condition that their destination remain a secret. The following month Bulloch entered a contract with Lucien Arman, a French shipbuilder and a personal confidant of Napoleon III, to build a pair of ironclad rams capable of breaking the Union blockade. To avoid suspicion, the ships' guns were manufactured separately from the ship herself and the pair were named Cheops and Sphinx to encourage rumors that they were intended for the Egyptian Navy.

Prior to delivery, however, a shipyard clerk walked into the U.S. Minister's office in Paris and produced documents which revealed that Arman had fraudulently obtained authorization to arm the ships and was in contact with Confederate agents. The French government blocked the sale under pressure from the United States, but Arman was able to sell the ships to Denmark and Prussia, which were then fighting on opposite sides of the Second Schleswig War. Cheops was sold to Prussia as Prinz Adalbert, while Sphinx was sold to Denmark under the name Stærkodder on 31 March 1864.

Manned by a Danish crew, the ship left Bordeaux for its shakedown cruise on 21 June 1864. The crew tested the vessel while final negotiations were being conducted between the Danish Naval Ministry and Arman. Intense haggling over the final price and a disagreement over compensation from the company for cited problems and late delivery led to negotiations breaking down on 30 October, although the ship had set sail for Copenhagen, Denmark, on 25 October. The Danish government refused to relinquish the vessel, claiming confusion in regards to the negotiations. She arrived in Copenhagen on 10 November and was in the Orlogsværftet dockyard at the beginning of 1865.

=== American career ===
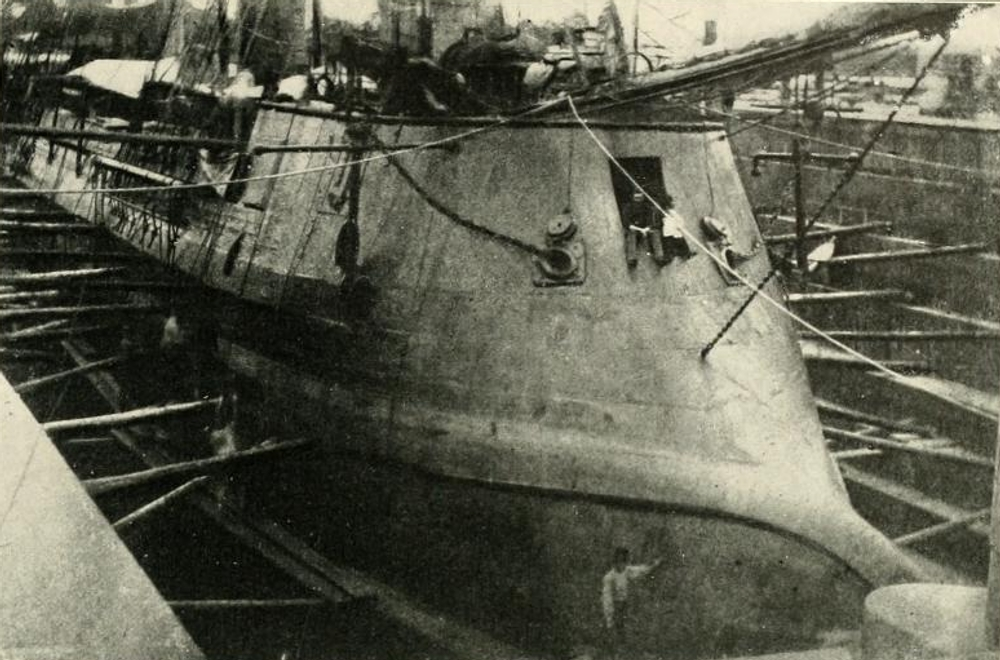
View of bow

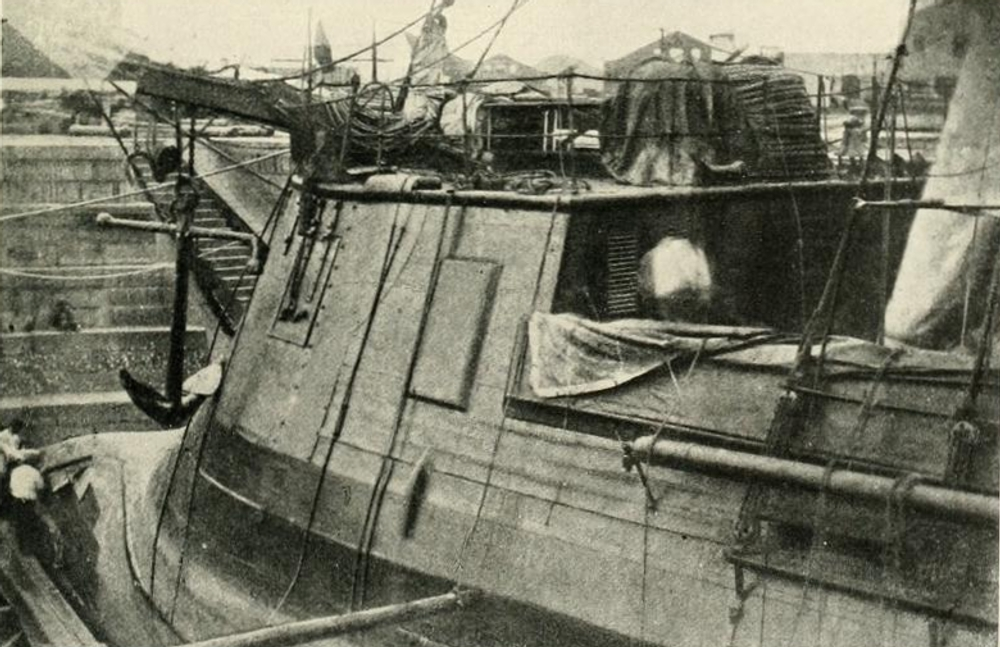
Closeup

At the beginning of 1865 the Danes sold the ship to the Confederacy. On 6 January the vessel took aboard a Confederate States Navy crew at Copenhagen under the command of Lieutenant Thomas Jefferson Page, although the ship was still commanded by a Danish captain when she put to sea the following day. Heavy weather forced the ship to take refuge at Elsinore, but she set sail shortly afterward for the French coast. She also used the cover name Olinde during this time. There she rendezvoused with the new British blockade runner City of Richmond, taking on supplies and ammunition, as well as more crewmen, from CSS Rappahannock and CSS Florida. During this time she was commissioned CSS Stonewall while still at sea and Page assumed command of the ship. High seas in the Bay of Biscay damaged her rudders while en route for the island of Madeira, Portugal, and forced the ship to seek refuge in Ferrol, Spain. Permanent repairs took several months and provided time for the Union to be notified of the ship's location.

In February and March, the Union steam frigate Niagara and steam sloop Sacramento kept watch from a distance as Stonewall lay anchored off A Coruña, waiting for Stonewall to finish her repairs. On 24 March Page put to sea, prepared to engage them, but the unarmored Union ships declined to fight. Stonewall steamed for Lisbon, Portugal, to re-coal, intending to cross the Atlantic Ocean from there. Stonewall reached Nassau, Bahamas, on 6 May and then sailed on to Havana, Cuba, where Page learned of the war's end when he arrived five days later.

Union ships first arrived at Havana on 15 May and were reinforced over the course of the month, to include the monitors Monadnock and Canonicus. Page decided to turn Stonewall over to the Spanish Captain General of Cuba for the sum of $16,000 to pay the crew's wages. The vessel would then be turned over to United States representatives in return for reimbursement of the same amount. The Americans did not pay until 2 November and Stonewall required some repairs before she could put to sea again. Escorted by the paddle steamers Rhode Island and Hornet, the ironclad departed Havana on 15 November and arrived at the Washington Navy Yard on 24 November. While sailing through Chesapeake Bay on the night of 22/23 November, Stonewall accidentally rammed and sank a coal schooner off Smith Island, Maryland; there were no deaths. She was subsequently paid off and laid up at the Washington Navy Yard.

=== Japanese career ===
Seeking to reinforce its fleet with modern warships, the Tokugawa shogunate sent representatives to the United States in 1867, seeking to purchase surplus ships. Acting envoy to the United States Ono Tomogoro discovered Stonewall in the Washington Navy Yard in May and made a formal offer to the United States government for the purchase of the ironclad. The purchase was concluded for the price of $400,000 and she was turned over to the Japanese on 5 August who renamed her Kōtetsu. However, by the time of her arrival in Shinagawa harbor on 22 January 1868, the Boshin War between the shogunate and pro-Imperial forces had begun, and the United States took a neutral stance, stopping the delivery of military material, including the delivery of Kōtetsu, to the Shogunate. The ship had arrived under a Japanese flag with an American crew, but the US Resident-Minister, Robert B. Van Valkenburg, ordered her put back under the American flag. Kōtetsu was finally delivered to the new Meiji government in early March 1869.

==== Boshin War ====
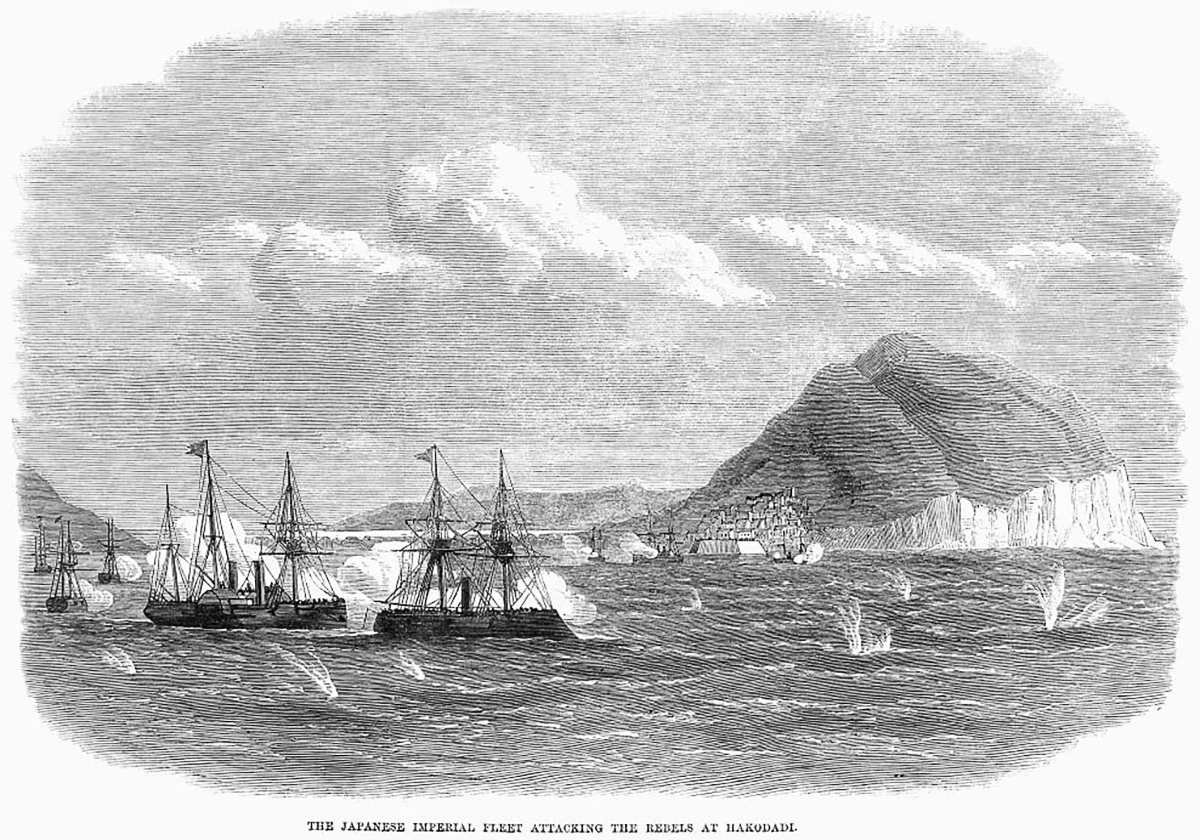
Kōtetsu leading the line of battle, at the Naval Battle of Hakodate

Before Kōtetsu was turned over to the Japanese, Tokugawa admiral Enomoto Takeaki refused to surrender his warships after the surrender of Edo Castle to the new government, and escaped to Hakodate in Hokkaido with the remainder of the Tokugawa Navy and a handful of French military advisers and their leader Jules Brunet. His fleet of eight steam warships was the strongest in Japan at the time. On 27 January 1869, Tokugawa loyalists declared the foundation of the Republic of Ezo and elected Enomoto as president. The Meiji government refused to accept partition of Japan and dispatched its newly formed Imperial Japanese Navy, which consisted of Kōtetsu as the flagship and a collection of various steam-powered warships that had been contributed by the various feudal domains loyal to the new government. On 25 March 1869, during the Battle of Miyako Bay, Kōtetsu successfully repulsed a surprise night attempt at naval boarding by the rebel Kaiten (spearheaded by survivors from the Shinsengumi), making use of a mounted Gatling gun. Kōtetsu subsequently supported the invasion of Hokkaidō and various naval engagements in the Naval Battle of Hakodate Bay.

==== Subsequent career ====
Following the end of the Boshin War in August 1870, Kōtetsu was classified as a third-class warship on 15 November 1871 and was renamed Azuma on 7 December. By January 1873, her fighting ability was assessed as low. Azuma was assigned to guard Nagasaki during the Saga rebellion in February 1874 and during the Taiwan Expedition of May 1874. On 19 August she ran aground at Kagoshima during a typhoon, but was refloated and repaired at the Yokosuka Naval Arsenal. During the Satsuma Rebellion of 1877, she was assigned to guard duties in the Seto Inland Sea. She was stricken from the navy list on 28 January 1888, and was sold for scrap on 12 December 1889. Her armor plating was reused to make the armature shafts in the electric generators in the Asakusa Thermal Power Station, built in Tokyo in 1895.

== See also ==
- French weapons in the American Civil War

== Bibliography ==
- Ballard, George A. (1921). The Influence of the Sea on the Political History of Japan. New York: E. P. Dutton. OCLC 576570743.
- Bennett, John D. (2008). The London Confederates. Jefferson NC: McFarland & Co. p. 77. ISBN 978-0-7864-6901-7.
- Canney, Donald L. (2015). The Confederate Steam Navy 1861–1865. Atglen, Pennsylvania: Schiffer Publishing. ISBN 978-0-7643-4824-2.
- Case, Lynn M. & Spencer, Warren F. (1970). The United States and France: Civil War Diplomacy. Philadelphia, Pennsylvania: University of Pennsylvania Press. OCLC 251911277.
- Greene, Jack & Massignani, Alessandro (1998). Ironclads at War: The Origin and Development of the Armored Warship, 1854–1891. Conshohocken, Pennsylvania: Combined Publishing. ISBN 0-938289-58-6.
- Jentschura, Hansgeorg; Jung, Dieter & Mickel, Peter (1977). Warships of the Imperial Japanese Navy, 1869–1945. Annapolis, Maryland: United States Naval Institute. ISBN 0-87021-893-X.
- Lengerer, Hans (2020). "The Kanghwa Affair and Treaty: A Contribution to the Pre-History of the Chinese–Japanese War of 1894–1895". Warship International. LVII (2). International Naval Research Organization: 110–131. ISSN 0043-0374.
- Scharf, J. Thomas (1887). History of the Confederate States Navy. New York: Rogers & Sherwood.
- Silverstone, Paul H. (2006). Civil War Navies 1855–1883. The U.S. Navy Warship Series. New York: Routledge. ISBN 0-415-97870-X.
- Silverstone, Paul H. (1984). Directory of the World's Capital Ships. New York: Hippocrene Books. ISBN 0-88254-979-0.
- Steensen, Robert Steen (1968). Vore Panserskibe [Our Armoured Vessels]. Marinehistorisk Selskabs skrift (in Danish). Vol. 10. Copenhagen, Denmark: Marinehistorik Seklskab. pp. 178–195. OCLC 771335910.
- "Stonewall". Ship Histories: Confederate Ships. Naval History and Heritage Command, US Navy. Archived from the original on 3 October 2015.
- United States, Naval War Records Office (1987) [1896]. Official Records of the Union and Confederate Navies in the War of the Rebellion. Series I. Vol. 3: The Operation of the Cruisers (April 1, 1864 - December 30, 1865). Harrisburg, Pennsylvania: National Historical Society. ISBN 978-0-918678-30-0.
- Watts, A. J. (1979). "Japan". In Chesneau, Roger & Kolesnik, Eugene M. (eds.). Conway's All the World's Fighting Ships 1860–1905. Greenwich, UK: Conway Maritime Press. pp. 216–239. ISBN 0-8317-0302-4.
