= Dyle et Bacalan =

Société Anonyme de Travaux Dyle et Bacalan
- Industry: Shipbuilding; Aerospace
- Predecessors: Ateliers and Chantiers de Bacalan; Ateliers de la Dyle
- Founded: 1879
- Defunct: 1936
- Fate: Merged with Ateliers et Chantiers du Sud-Ouest, 1930
- Successor: Ateliers et Chantiers du Sud-Ouest et de Bacalan Reunis
- Headquarters: Bordeaux, France
- Products: Ships and aircraft

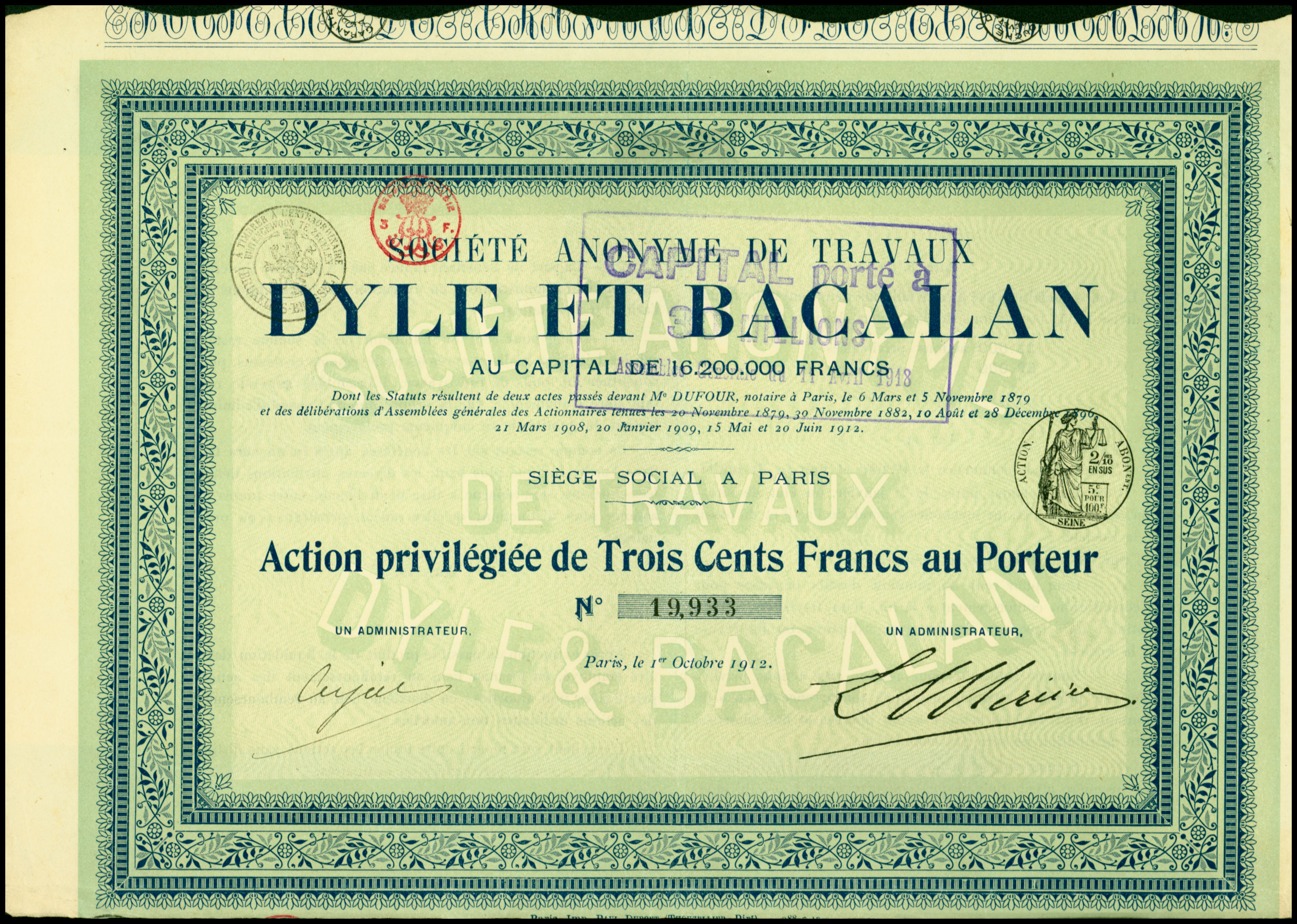
Preferred share of the SA de Travaux Dyle et Bacalan, issued 1. October 1912

The Société Anonyme de Travaux Dyle et Bacalan was formed in 1879 by the merger of the Belgian Ateliers de la Dyle and Ateliers and Chantiers de Bacalan which had emerged from the bankruptcy of the Arman Brothers shipyard in 1867. The company entered the aviation market during the 1920s and merged with Ateliers et Chantiers du Sud-Ouest in 1930 to form Ateliers et Chantiers du Sud-Ouest et de Bacalan Reunis, while spinning off its aviation activities as the Société Aérienne Bordelaise. The combined company closed its doors in 1936.

Among other endeavors, the company acquired the rights to build the Curitiba-Paranaguá railway line, executing its construction from 1870 to 1875 under the direction of Antonio Ferrucci and later of João Teixeira Soares, through the Compagnie Génerale des Chemins de Fer Brésiliens.

== Bibliography ==
- de Saint Hubert, C. (1986). "Builders, Enginebuilders, and Designers of Armored Vessels Built in France 1855–1940". F.P.D.S. Newsletter. XIV (3): 2–8.
