= USS Hornet (1865) =

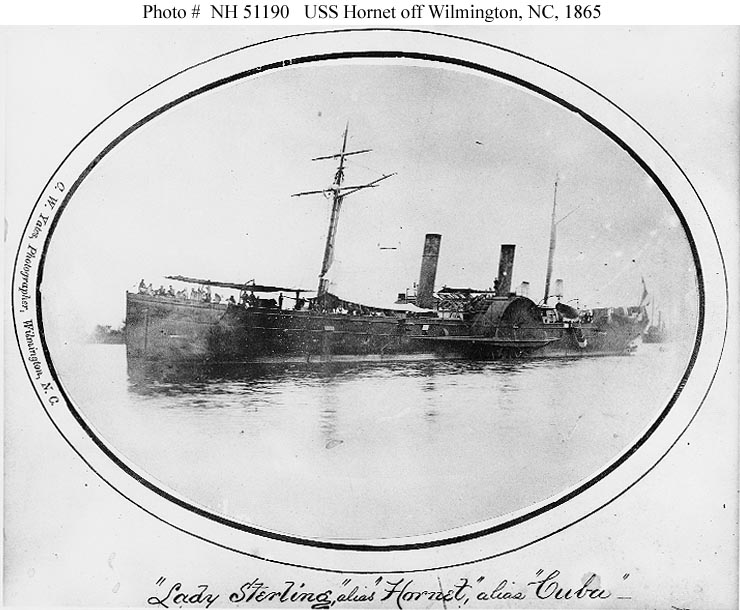
- USS Hornet

History

United States
- Laid down: 1864
- Launched: 1864
- Christened: Lady Stirling
- Completed: 1864
- Acquired: 28 October 1864
- Decommissioned: 15 December 1865
- Renamed: USS Hornet, 25 April 1865
- Captured: 1864
- Fate: Sold, 1869

General characteristics
- Type: Sidewheel steamer, blockade runner
- Displacement: 835 tons
- Length: 242 ft (74 m)
- Beam: 26 ft 6 in (8.08 m)
- Draft: 13 ft 3 in (4.04 m)

USS Hornet was the fifth United States Navy ship to bear the name Hornet. She was originally CSS Lady Stirling, a blockade runner built by James Ash at Cubitt Town, London in 1864 for the Confederate States Navy. She was badly damaged and captured by the United States Navy on 28 October 1864 off Wilmington, North Carolina.

== History ==
Following condemnation by a prize court, Lady Sterling was bought by the U.S. Navy, repaired, armed, and commissioned as USS Lady Sterling and later renamed USS Hornet on 25 April 1865. In navy service she mainly operated in the Chesapeake Bay squadron. In October 1865, Hornet escorted the Confederate ironclad CSS Stonewall from Cuba to the United States.

Hornet was decommissioned on 15 December 1865 and sold into private ownership in 1869. After the war Hornet was involved in several filibustering expeditions to Cuba under the names Hornet and Cuba, including an unsuccessful mission in January 1871 to deliver weapons and ammunition to Cuban rebels during the Ten Years' War.

== See also ==
- Blockade runners of the American Civil War
- Ships captured in the American Civil War

== Bibliography ==
- Daniels, Secretary of the Navy, Josephus; Marsh, Captain, U.S.Navy, retired, C.C. (1921). Official records of the Union and Confederate navies in the War of the Rebellion.
  Government Printing Office, United States. Naval War Records Office, United States.
  Office of Naval Records and Library. p. 276. Url
- "Cuban Affairs: The Seizure of the Cargo of the Hornet etc" (PDF). The New York Times. 26 January 1871.
