= Ateliers et Chantiers de Bacalan =

Ateliers and Chantiers de Bacalan
- Industry: Mechanical engineering
- Predecessor: Compagnie des Chantiers et Ateliers de l'Ocean
- Founded: about 1868
- Defunct: Merged with Ateliers de la Dyle, 1879
- Successor: Société Anonyme de Travaux Dyle et Bacalan
- Headquarters: Bordeaux, France
- Products: Industrial machinery

Ateliers and Chantiers de Bacalan was formed after the bankruptcy of Compagnie des Chantiers et Ateliers de l'Ocean in 1868. Although it possessed the shipyard of its predecessor, it made no use of the facility and instead focused on industrial engines and machinery. It also managed the Saint-Nazaire shipyard for the Compagnie Générale Transatlantique from its founding until the shipyard closed in 1871. In 1879 it merged with the Belgian company Ateliers de la Dyle to form Société Anonyme de Travaux Dyle et Bacalan and resumed shipbuilding.

== Bibliography ==
- de Saint Hubert, C. (1986). "Builders, Enginebuilders, and Designers of Armored Vessels Built in France 1855–1940". F.P.D.S. Newsletter. XIV (3): 2–8.
