= Arman Brothers =

Shipbuilding company in France

Arman Shipyards
- Native name: Chantiers Arman
- Industry: Shipbuilding
- Founded: 18th century
- Defunct: 1868
- Fate: Converted into a limited company, 1864/1865; Bankrupt, 1868
- Successor: Compagnie des Chantiers et Ateliers de l'Ocean (1864/1865); Ateliers and Chantiers de Bacalan (1868?)
- Headquarters: Bordeaux, France
- Key people: Lucien Arman
- Products: Ships

Arman Shipyards (Chantiers Arman) was a shipbuilding company in Bordeaux, France, in the 18th and 19th centuries that built both merchant ships and warships. The company built two ironclads for the Confederate States Navy during the American Civil War : the Sphinx and the Chéops. From 1867 to 1871 it and its successors managed the St. Nazaire shipyard of the Compagnie Générale Transatlantique until it closed in the latter year.

The company went bankrupt in 1868 due to overextension and economic reverses. The shipyard in Bordeaux was seized by the company's creditors and reformed into the Ateliers and Chantiers de Bacalan while the newly built shipyard and steam engine factory near Le Havre, France, were sold off to Forges et Chantiers de la Méditerranée in 1872.

== Bibliography ==
- de Saint Hubert, C. (1986). "Builders, Enginebuilders, and Designers of Armored Vessels Built in France 1855–1940". F.P.D.S. Newsletter. XIV (3): 2–8.
