= SMS Arminius =

Ironclad turret ship of the German Imperial Navy

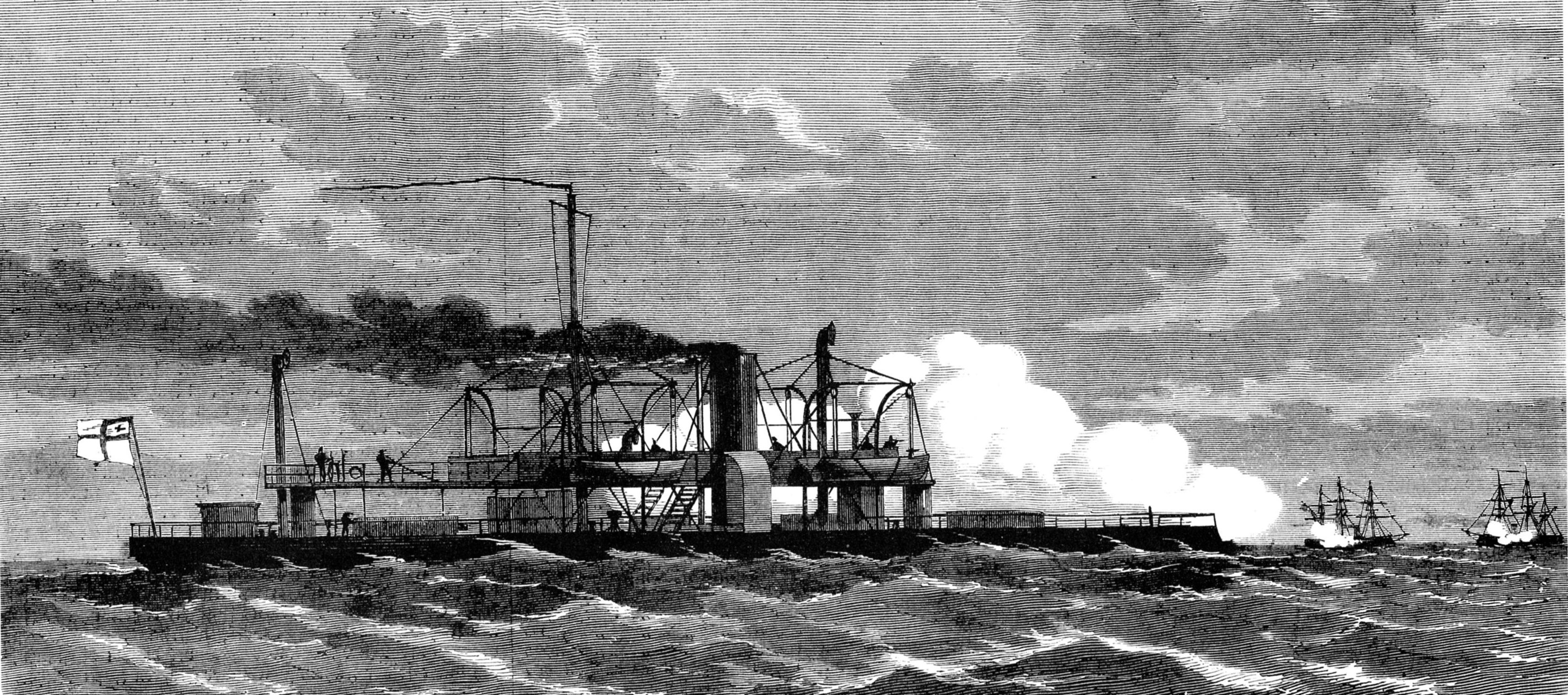
- Illustration of SMS Arminius engaging French warships during the Franco-Prussian War

Class overview
- Operators: Prussian Navy; Imperial German Navy
- Preceded by: None
- Succeeded by: Prinz Adalbert

History

German Empire
- Name: SMS Arminius
- Namesake: Arminius
- Builder: Samuda Brothers, Cubitt Town, London
- Laid down: 1863
- Launched: 20 August 1864
- Commissioned: 22 April 1865
- Decommissioned: 1875
- Stricken: 2 March 1901
- Fate: Scrapped, 1902

General characteristics
- Type: Turret ship
- Displacement: Full load: 1,829 t (1,800 long tons)
- Length: 63.21 m (207 ft 5 in)
- Beam: 10.9 m (35 ft 9 in)
- Draft: 7.6 m (24 ft 11 in)
- Installed power: 4 × boilers; 1,200 PS (1,200 ihp)
- Propulsion: 1 × single-expansion steam engine; 1 × screw propeller
- Sail plan: Schooner-rigged
- Speed: 10 knots (19 km/h; 12 mph)
- Range: 2,000 nmi (3,700 km; 2,300 mi) at 8 kn (15 km/h; 9.2 mph)
- Crew: 10 officers; 122 enlisted men
- Armament: 4 × 21 cm (8.3 in) Krupp guns
- Armor: Waterline belt: 76–114 mm (3.0–4.5 in); Gun turrets: 114 mm; Conning tower: 114 mm

SMS Arminius (Note: "SMS" stands for "Seiner Majestät Schiff", or "His Majesty's Ship".) was an ironclad warship of the Prussian Navy, later the Imperial German Navy. The vessel was a turret ship that was designed by the British Royal Navy Captain Cowper Coles and built by the Samuda Brothers shipyard in Cubitt Town, London as a speculative effort; Prussia purchased the ship during the Second Schleswig War against Denmark, though the vessel was not delivered until after the war. The ship was armed with four 21 cm (8.3 in) guns in a pair of revolving gun turrets amidships. She was named for Arminius, the victor of the Battle of the Teutoburg Forest.

Arminius served as a coastal defense ship for the first six years of her service with the Prussian Navy. She saw extensive service in the Austro-Prussian and Franco-Prussian wars during the process of German unification. The vessel was the primary challenge to the French blockade of German ports during the latter conflict. After the wars, Arminius was withdrawn from front-line service and used in a variety of secondary roles, including as a training ship for engine-room crews and as a tender for the school ship Blücher. The ship was eventually sold in 1901 and broken up for scrap the following year.

== Design ==
The warship that came to be SMS Arminius was designed by Captain Cowper Coles, a British Royal Navy officer and advocate of turret-armed ironclad warships. Arminius was nearly identical to the Danish ironclad Rolf Krake, also designed by Coles.

=== General characteristics and machinery ===
Arminius was 61.6 meters (202 ft 1 in) long at the waterline and 63.21 m (207 ft 5 in) long overall. The ship had a beam of 10.9 m (35 ft 9 in) and a draft of 4.32 m (14 ft 2 in) forward and 4.55 m (14 ft 11 in) aft. She was designed to displace 1,653 metric tons (1,627 long tons) but at full load, Arminius displaced up to 1,829 t (1,800 long tons). The vessel was constructed with transverse frames and constructed with an iron hull, which contained eight watertight compartments. As was common for warships of the period, she was fitted with a ram bow.

The ship's crew consisted of ten officers and 122 enlisted men. She carried a number of smaller boats, including two pinnaces, two cutters, and one dinghy. Arminius was not a particularly successful design; she suffered from severe, fast rolling, especially in heavier seas. She also shipped a great deal of water over the bow and was unbalanced in steering. The ship turned rapidly to starboard but was sluggish in turning to port. The ship was required to have the rudder at 15 degrees to port in order to remain on a straight course. It was also impossible to control the ship with only sail power.

The ship was powered by a single two-cylinder single-expansion steam engine built by J. Penn & Sons, Greenwich. The engine drove a single two-bladed screw propeller that was 3.96 m (13 ft) in diameter. Four coal fired, transverse trunk boilers, each of which had four fireboxes apiece, supplied steam to the engine. The boilers were also built by J Penn & Sons, Greenwich, and were arranged in a single boiler room. Limited electrical power was provided by a single generator, which supplied 1.9 kilowatts at 55 volts. The ship was equipped with a schooner rig with a surface area of 540 square meters. The propulsion system was rated at 1,200 metric horsepower (1,200 ihp) and a top speed of 10 knots (19 km/h; 12 mph), though on trials, Arminius reached 1,440 PS (1,420 ihp) and 11.2 kn (20.7 km/h; 12.9 mph). The ship carried 171 t (168 long tons; 188 short tons) of coal, which enabled a range of 2,000 nautical miles (3,700 km; 2,300 mi) at a cruising speed of 8 kn (15 km/h; 9.2 mph).

=== Armament and armor ===
As built, Arminius was equipped with a main battery of four rifled, bronze 72-pounder cannon, but after delivery to the Prussian Navy they were replaced with four Krupp 21 cm RK L/19 of 20.95 cm (8.25 in) caliber. These guns were supplied with a total of 332 rounds, and could elevate to 12 degrees. At maximum elevation, the guns could engage targets out to 2,800 m (3,100 yd). After 1881, four machine guns were installed, along with a single 35 cm (13.8 in) torpedo tube mounted in the bow above the waterline.

Arminius's armor consisted of wrought iron backed with teak plating. The conning tower was protected by 114 mm (4.5 in) of wrought iron on 229 mm (9 in) of teak. The armored belt ranged in thickness from 76 mm (3 in) of iron on the bow and stern to 114 mm amidships, the entire length of which was backed by 229 mm of teak. The two turrets were armored with 114 mm of iron on 406 mm (16 in) of timber.

== Service history ==
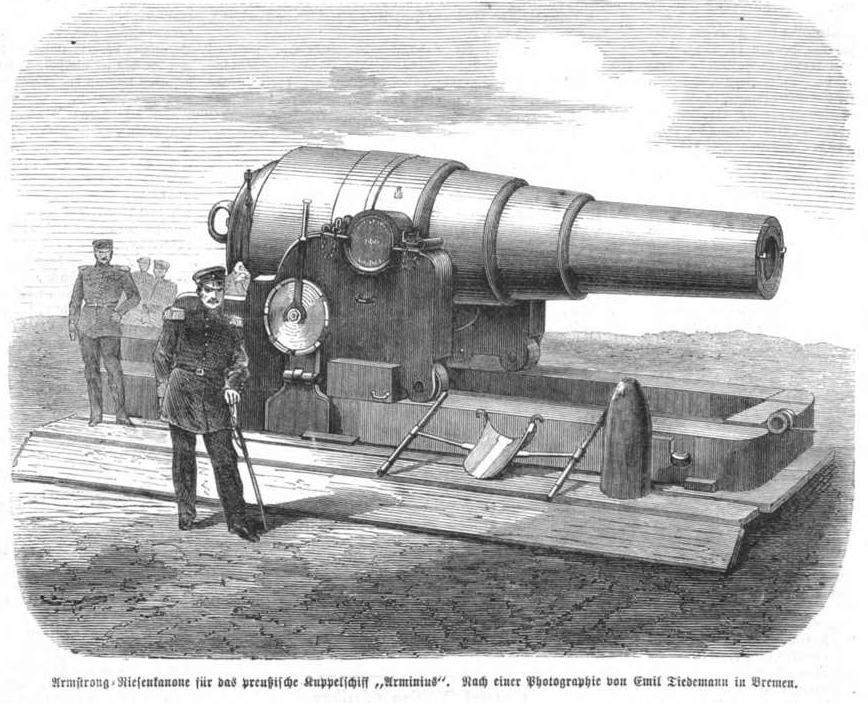
Illustration of one of Arminius' four guns

=== Construction ===
She was built by the Samuda Brothers shipyard in London as a speculative project, possibly to sell to the Confederate Navy. The ship was laid down in 1863 and was launched on 20 August 1864. Prussia instead purchased the ship on 20 August 1864 for some 1,887,000 gold marks, paid in part through public donations. The Prussians had hoped to secure the vessel by September, but delivery was delayed by the British government over the Second Schleswig War between Prussia and Denmark. As the British were sympathetic to Denmark, they prevented the ship from being delivered until after the war was concluded.

At her launching, she was christened Arminius for the victor of the Battle of the Teutoburg Forest against the Romans in 9 CE; the name was chosen to evoke the common feeling of German unity at the time. Commissioning of the ship was delayed after the Prussian naval command decided to use the men who had been allocated to Arminius to commission the new screw corvette Victoria instead. This decision was in part made due to heavy ice in the Kieler Förde, which prevented Arminius from entering the port until 4 April 1865. Victoria arrived in London on 20 April with a second crew for Arminius, allowing her to be commissioned two days later.

After entering service, the ship conducted initial sea trials, though her armament had not yet been fitted. On 3 May, she and Victoria departed Britain. The two ships steamed across the North Sea, and after encountering severe storms, stopped at Skagen, Denmark, for shelter. They later stopped in Helsingør, Denmark, before arriving in Kiel on 15 May. She got underway on 1 June and steamed to Danzig, where she was decommissioned to have her guns installed. Along with the ironclad ram Prinz Adalbert, Arminius was the first armored warship acquired by the Prussian Navy.

=== Austro-Prussian War ===
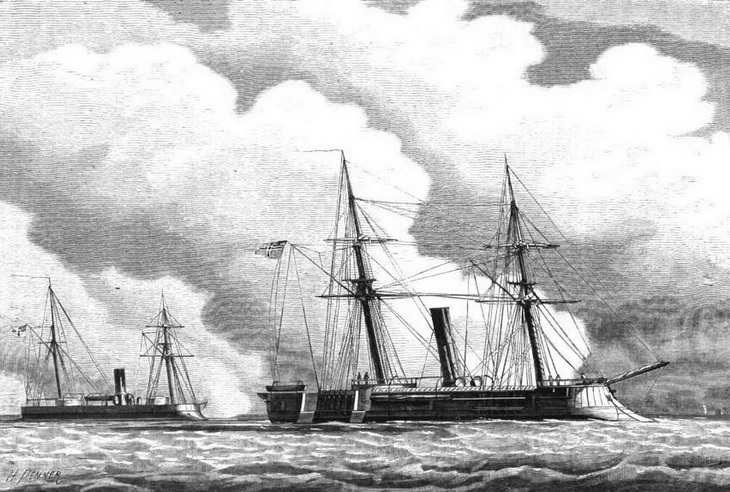
Arminius (left) with Prinz Adalbert (right)

She was reactivated in May 1866 under the command of Korvettenkapitän (KK—Corvette Captain) Reinhold von Werner, initially to have work done on her gun turrets, but this was delayed as tensions between Austria and Prussia increased. Arminius received her mobilization order on 12 May, instructing her to depart for Kiel, which was at that time under Austrian control. The Prussians hoped that her presence would intimidate the Austrian commander, Lieutenant Field Marshal Ludwig von Gablenz. She arrived there on 1 June and anchored off the city's coastal fortifications five days later. The next day, Arminius was assigned to a squadron commanded by Konteradmiral (Rear Admiral) Eduard von Jachmann, which also included his flagship, the screw frigate Arcona. Arminius joined a flotilla of ships that was also being transferred from the Baltic Sea to join Jachmann's squadron in the North Sea; these included the aviso Loreley and the gunboats Tiger, Cyclop, and Wolf. Werner was placed in command of the unit and given the title of Kommodore (Commodore). The ships got underway on 12 June and passed through the Danish Straits, the Skagerrak, and into the North Sea.

The ships arrived in Hamburg, having covered a distance of some 940 nautical miles (1,740 km; 1,080 mi) in 100 hours, an impressive feat for an early ironclad warship. As the war had not yet started, the ships were first ordered to observe the movements of the Austrian Kalik Brigade in Holstein; the Prussians had learned from the Austrian military attache in Berlin that the unit had orders to retreat to Hannoverian territory, namely Wilhelmsburg and Harburg, in the event of war. Unrest broke out in Altona, prompting Werner to send a landing party of one officer and forty men ashore to secure the rail facility in the town. The Austro-Prussian War began on 14 June, and hostilities with Hannover began the following day. Without a naval threat from Austria, the Prussian navy therefore concentrated its effort against the Kingdom of Hanover. For the remainder of the conflict, Arminius operated out of Geestemünde, under Werner's command, and the mere appearance of Arminius caused several Hanoverian coastal batteries to surrender. On 15 June, Arminius, Tiger, and Cyclop, covered the crossing of the Elbe river by General Edwin von Manteuffel and some 13,500 soldiers to attack the city of Hanover. The crossing took place in the span of ten hours, and Werner's flotilla later covered the crossing of additional forces to support Manteuffel, including cavalry and artillery units.

Arminius, Cyclop, and Tiger sent men ashore at Brunshausen, where they spiked the guns of an abandoned coastal artillery battery. Werner then detached Tiger and Wolf to bombard the batteries at the mouth of the Elbe, while Cyclop was sent to attack the battery at Grauerort. Arminius entered the Elbe on 17 June, but heavy storms prevented her from intercepting a Norddeutscher Lloyd steamship that was carrying the Hannoverian gold reserves to Britain. The Prussian army, supported by Werner's flotilla, had succeeded in capturing all of the major fortifications guarding the Elbe, Weser, and Ems by 22 June, and other naval forces from the Baltic and Mediterranean Sea had arrived to further strengthen the Prussian fleet. Arminius and the other vessels thereafter patrolled the coast of Ostfriesland to show the flag. By the end of the month, the Prussian army had decisively defeated the Austrians at Königgrätz and ended the war. Following the signing of the peace treaty that formally ended the conflict, Werner's flotilla was disbanded on 23 August and Arminius returned to Kiel.

On 3 October, the USS Miantonomoh, a monitor of the US Navy arrived in Kiel while on a promotional tour of European ports; she and Arminius raced the next day, and the latter was two knots faster than the American vessel. Arminius was decommissioned on 20 October, and was only reactivated in 1867 for use as a gunnery training ship to support Thetis, since the latter lacked turret guns. In June, modernization work on the ship began in Kiel, but in September, she had to be sent to Karlskrona, Sweden, to be dry-docked and have her bottom cleaned. She returned to Germany in late November, where she was again decommissioned to allow work to resume. The overhaul included replacing her original rig with a lighter rigging with pole masts. A weather deck, which extended from just astern of the forward turret to her stern, was also fitted and ventilators for the hull were extended up through the new deck. In 1870, the ship had her sailing rig removed altogether, as it had been determined that she could not be steered while under sail, and the masts blocked the firing arcs of the gun turrets. Work on the ship was delayed by accidents during sea trials, and the ship was not ready for active service again until shortly before the conflict with France.

=== Franco-Prussian War ===
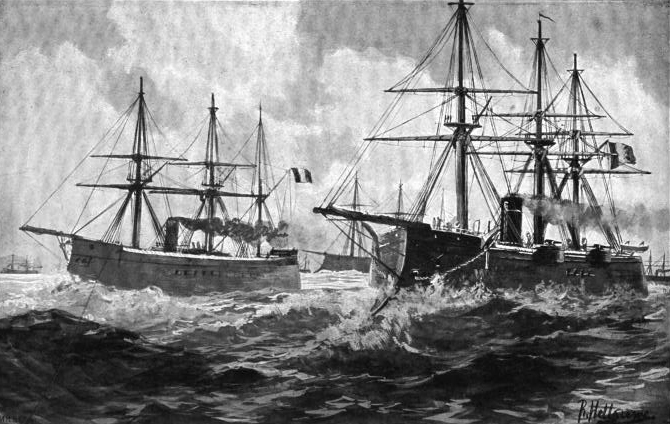
French ironclads on the blockade of Prussia's North Sea coast; Arminius sortied repeatedly to engage them, but rarely encountered the French ships

At the outbreak of the Franco-Prussian War on 19 July 1870, the Prussian Navy concentrated Arminius and the armored frigates Kronprinz, Friedrich Carl, and König Wilhelm in the North Sea naval base at Wilhelmshaven. Arminius received her mobilization order on the first day of the war, and at that point she was stationed in Kiel. She sortied on 27 July under the command of KK Otto Livonius to break through the French blockade by hugging the Swedish coast, which her shallow draft permitted. Her passage through Swedish territorial waters also protected the ship from French attack. The ship reached Cuxhaven on 30 July and proceeded to Wilhelmshaven on 1 August. Despite the great French naval superiority, the French had conducted insufficient pre-war planning for an assault on the Prussian naval installations, and concluded that it would only be possible with Danish assistance, which was not forthcoming. Arminius and the three armored frigates, under the command of now Vizeadmiral (Vice Admiral) Jachmann, made an offensive sortie in early August 1870 out to the Dogger Bank, though they encountered no French warships. The three frigates thereafter suffered from chronic engine trouble, which left Arminius alone to conduct operations.

In the course of the war, she sortied from the port over forty times; these also failed to result in major combat, though she occasionally traded shots with the blockading French warships. She briefly engaged a French frigate on 24 August, but the latter quickly withdrew. For the majority of the war, Arminius was stationed in the mouth of the Elbe along with the ironclad ram Prinz Adalbert and three small gunboats. The three armored frigates remained off the island of Wangerooge, where their crews attempted to repair their troublesome engines. On 11 September, the three frigates were again ready for action; they joined Arminius for another major operation, though it too did not encounter French opposition. The French Navy had by this time returned to France. On 18 October, Arminius collided with the aviso Falke, though she was not seriously damaged in the accident, though Falke was badly holed below the waterline. On 23 December, Arminius and the rest of the ships stationed in Wilhelmshaven entered the inner harbor of the port, the dredging of which had recently been completed; the outer Jade Bay had iced over, preventing further operations for the winter.

=== Later career ===
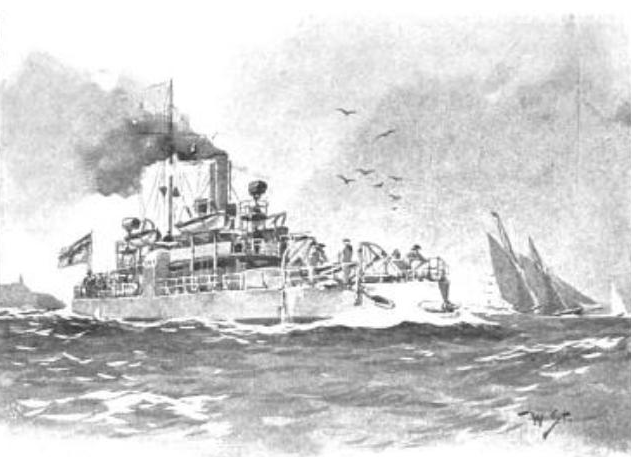
Arminius later in her career, by Willy Stöwer

Following the war, the now-German Kaiserliche Marine (Imperial Navy) began to demobilize in early 1871. On 29 March 1871, Arminius, the screw frigate Elisabeth, and the aviso Grille departed Wilhelmshaven for the Baltic. Severe storms delayed their progress, and they reached Kiel on 4 April. Arminius was decommissioned there on 27 April. Beginning on 1 May 1872, the ship was used as a training vessel for naval engineers and boiler room personnel, under the command of KK Philipp von Kall. She also took part in shooting practice with the gunnery school, before being decommissioned again on 1 October. She resumed school ship duties from 16 April to 31 May 1873, from 17 March to mid-May 1874, and from 15 March to 31 May 1875, which was to be her final commissioning. The ship was thereafter decommissioned and placed in reserve.

Her ram bow allowed her to be used as an icebreaker in the Baltic in the 1880s. She was activated for that purpose in May 1881 to assist in clearing paths for vessels in Kiel. In 1882, she was extensively overhauled and then used as a tender for the cadet training vessel Blücher from August to November. In 1886 and again from January to July 1887, Arminius resumed her old training ship duties. Arminius was sent to the Flensburger Förde for icebreaking work from March to April 1888. The ship was rebuilt again later that year; during the refit the propulsion system was overhauled and replaced with German-built equipment and two searchlights were installed. Four machine guns were installed, along with a 35 cm (13.8 in) torpedo tube. She was reclassified as a special purpose vessel on 10 October. She did not return to service, however, and was ultimately stricken from the naval register on 2 March 1901. Later that year, she was used in a weapons test with a new torpedo warhead, which caused considerable damage to the ship. She was thereafter sold to ship breakers for 72,000 gold marks in 1902, and was towed to Hamburg to be broken up that year.
