= Lucien Arman =

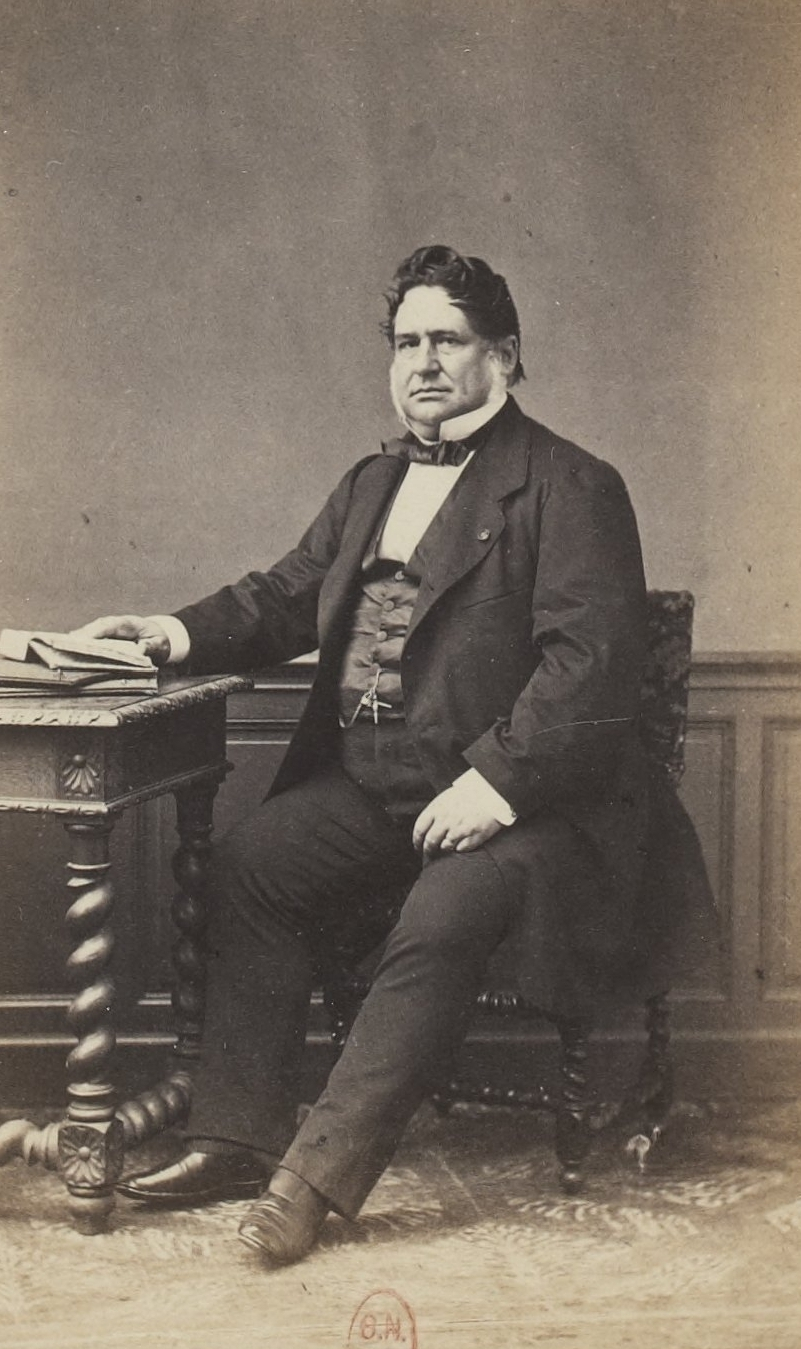
- Arman in 1852–1857
- Born: 23 November 1811; Bordeaux, France
- Died: 7 October 1873 (aged 61); Bordeaux, France
- Burial place: Cimetière de la Chartreuse
- Occupations: Shipbuilder, naval architect, politician
- Awards: Commandeur of the Légion d'honneur

General Councilor of the Gironde
- In office 1854–1871

Member of the National Assembly
- In office 21 July 1857 – 15 January 1869

Lucien Arman (23 November 1811 – 7 October 1873) was a French shipbuilder, naval architect and politician. He owned the Arman Brothers shipyard and served as a member of the National Assembly.

== Life ==
Following in the footsteps of his father, Jean-Léonard Arman, he studied mathematics and received a diploma as a shipbuilder. He became a partner in the family shipyard producing merchant ships and warships for the French and Imperial Russian Navies. Arman invented a method for composite construction using iron and wood for steam-powered ships and was awarded a great medal in the naval and military arts category at the Exposition Universelle of 1855.

He was elected as a member of the Bordeaux Gironde Chamber of Commerce by his fellow businessmen. Arman was elected a municipal counselor and then as a General Councilor of the Gironde from the Canton of Cadillac in 1854. Friendly with Emperor Napoleon III, he was easily elected as the government candidate in the 1857 French legislative election. Arman was elected to the Académie des sciences, belles-lettres et arts de Bordeaux in 1859. The Emperor and Empress Eugénie attended the wedding of his son, Albert Arman, to Léontine Lippmann in the Tuileries Chapel. He was reelected in the 1863 French legislative election and was appointed as a Commander of the Legion of Honour the next year.

After heavily investing in a new shipyard and steam engine factory near Le Havre, the over-extended Arman went bankrupt in 1868 and resigned from all of his public offices the following year. He died in Bordeaux in 1873 and is buried in the Cimetière de la Chartreuse.

== Family ==
Albert and Léontine adopted the surname Arman de Caillavet and were the parents of the playwright Gaston Arman et Caillavet.

== Bibliography ==
- de Saint Hubert, C. (1986). "Builders, Enginebuilders, and Designers of Armored Vessels Built in France 1855–1940". F.P.D.S. Newsletter. XIV (3): 2–8.
