= SMS Prinz Adalbert (1865) =

Ironclad ram of the German Imperial Navy

- Prinz Adalbert

Class overview
- Operators: Prussian Navy; Imperial German Navy
- Preceded by: Arminius
- Succeeded by: Friedrich Carl
- Completed: 1
- Scrapped: 1

History

German Empire
- Name: Prinz Adalbert
- Namesake: Adalbert of Prussia
- Ordered: 16 July 1863
- Builder: Arman Brothers, Bordeaux
- Launched: June 1864
- Acquired: 10 July 1865
- Decommissioned: 28 October 1871
- In service: 9 June 1866
- Out of service: 23 October 1871
- Stricken: 28 May 1878
- Fate: Scrapped, 1878

General characteristics
- Type: Ironclad ram
- Displacement: Full load: 1,560 metric tons (1,540 long tons)
- Length: 56.96 m (186 ft 11 in)
- Beam: 9.92 m (32 ft 7 in)
- Draft: 5.02 m (16 ft 6 in) (mean)
- Installed power: 1,200 PS (1,184 ihp); × boilers
- Propulsion: 2 × single-expansion steam engine; 2 × screw propellers
- Sail plan: Brig-rigged
- Speed: 9.5 knots (17.6 km/h; 10.9 mph)
- Range: 1,200 nmi (2,200 km; 1,400 mi) at 8 knots (15 km/h; 9.2 mph)
- Complement: 10 officers; 120 enlisted men
- Armament: 1 × 20.95 cm (8.2 in) gun; 2 × 17.26 cm (6.8 in) guns
- Armor: Belt: 127 mm (5 in); Gun turrets: 114 mm (4.5 in)

SMS Prinz Adalbert (Note: "SMS" stands for "Seiner Majestät Schiff", or "His Majesty's Ship".) was an ironclad warship of the Prussian Navy and later the Imperial fleet. She was built in Bordeaux, France in 1864 for the Confederate States Navy. Prussia bought her during the Second Schleswig War against Denmark, but she was not delivered until after the war. She was designed as an armored ram but also carried three guns: one 21 cm (8.3 in) and two 17 cm (6.7 in) pieces in armored turrets. She was named after Prince Adalbert of Prussia, an early proponent of Prussian naval power.

The ship was poorly built and as a result had a very limited service career. She was heavily modified after her delivery to Prussia in 1865 and briefly served with the fleet between 1866 and 1871. During the Franco-Prussian War in 1870–1871, the ship was assigned as a guard ship in Hamburg. After the war, it was discovered that the internal wood construction was badly rotted; she was therefore removed from service in October 1871. Prinz Adalbert was stricken from the naval register in May 1878 and broken up for scrap that year.

== Design ==
=== General characteristics and propulsion ===
Prinz Adalbert was 50.48 meters (165 ft 7 in) long at the waterline and 56.96 m (186 ft 11 in) long overall. She had a beam of 9.92 m (32 ft 7 in) and a draft of 4.96 m (16 ft 3 in) forward and 5.02 m (16 ft 6 in) aft. She was designed to displace 1,440 metric tons (1,420 long tons) at a normal load and up to 1,560 t (1,540 long tons) at full load. The ship's hull was constructed from transverse frames, and included both iron and timber. The hull was sheathed in copper to protect it from parasites and biofouling and it featured a pronounced tumblehome. The Prussians regarded the ship as a poor seaboat. The ram bow caused the vessel to ship a great deal of water. It was, however, responsive to commands from the helm and had a very tight turning radius. Prinz Adalbert had a crew of ten officers and 120 enlisted men.

Prinz Adalbert's propulsion system was provided by Mazeline, based in Le Havre. The ship was powered by a pair of 2-cylinder single-expansion steam engines, each of which drove a four-bladed screw propeller that was 3.6 m (11 ft 10 in) in diameter. The engines were placed in a single engine room. Two trunk boilers, also in a single boiler room, supplied steam to the engines at 1.5 standard atmospheres (150 kPa). Her propulsion system was rated to produce 1,200 PS (1,184 ihp) for a top speed of 9.5 knots (17.6 km/h; 10.9 mph). Two rudders were fitted side by side to control the vessel and ensure good maneuverability, because the ram was its primary offensive weapon. The ship was initially fitted with a 740-square-meter (8,000 sq ft) brig sailing rig to supplement the steam engines, though this was subsequently replaced with a 677-square-meter (7,290 sq ft) topsail schooner rig.

=== Armament and armor ===
As built, Prinz Adalbert was armed with a main battery of three rifled 36-pounder muzzle-loading guns. One was placed in a fixed five-port bow casemate, while the other two were located in a fixed two-port turret amidships. The guns were on movable pivot mounts to allow them to fire through the different firing ports.

After delivery in 1865, the French guns were replaced with Krupp-built guns: a 21 cm RK L/19 gun of 20.95-centimeter (8.25 in) caliber was placed in the bow and two 17 cm RK L/25 of 17.26 cm (6.80 in) caliber were placed in the central battery. The forward gun was supplied with 76 rounds of ammunition while the central guns had 71 shells each. Prinz Adalbert was armored with wrought iron, which was mounted on the wooden hull. The armored belt, which protected the waterline of the ship, was 127 mm (5 in) thick. The turrets were protected by 114 mm (4.5 in) of armor plating on the sides.

== Service history ==
=== Construction and acquisition ===
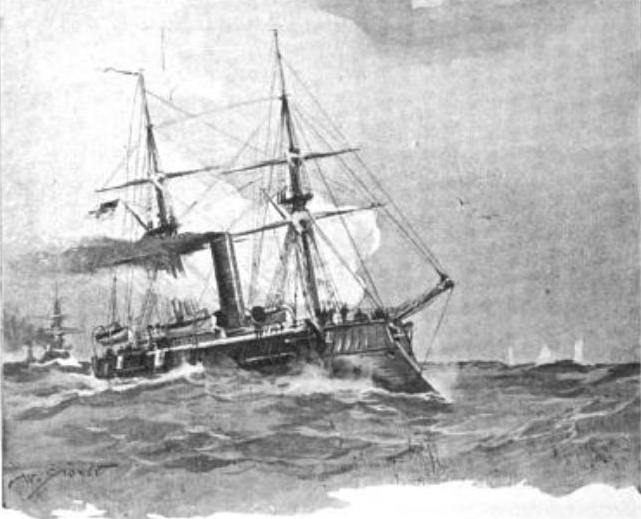
Prinz Adalbert under way, by Willy Stöwer

Prinz Adalbert was built under the cover name Cheops along with a sister ship named Sphinx by the French shipyard of the Arman Brothers in Bordeaux. Nominally being built for the Egyptian Navy, they were actually intended for sale to the Confederate States of America. The French emperor, Napoleon III, intervened and ordered Arman Brothers to sell both vessels to another navy immediately. In early 1864 during the Second Schleswig War between the Prussian and Austrian alliance and Denmark, both the Prussian and Danish fleets sought vessels that could be purchased abroad. The Prussians initially requested vessels for purchase through their consul in Toulon, including an ironclad. After several letters were exchanged, Korvettenkapitän (KK—Corvette Captain) Ludwig von Henk and Carl Elbertzhagen, the chief Prussian naval engineer and member of the Admiralitätsrat (Admiralty Council), traveled to France on 28 April to inspect Cheops on the slipway. On 31 March, Denmark secured the contract for Sphinx but Cheops was sold to Prussia on 25 May.

Delivery was scheduled for 1 August, but after the Prussian naval engineer Guyot went to Bordeaux to supervise completion of the ship, he determined that the shipyard could not complete the ship in time to meet the delivery date. And by that time, the Danish had received Sphinx and had experienced significant problems with the vessel. As a result, the Prussians cancelled the order, though they reinstated it in January 1865, in part due to their satisfaction with the two Augusta-class corvettes, which they had also purchased from Arman Brothers. The shipyard persuaded the Prussians to reconsider, and agreed to deliver the ship on 1 April. By the time Prussia agreed to purchase the vessel, the war was over. The French government nevertheless initially refused to transfer the vessel, due to Arman's repeated attempts to obscure the intended buyer, first the Confederate Navy and then the Prussian Navy. The vessel was finally delivered in October and Kapitänleutnant (KL—Lieutenant Captain) Archibald MacLean oversaw the voyage to Prussia.

The ship, still named Cheops, left Bordeaux on 3 May and stopped in Cherbourg and Gothenburg, Sweden, to coal on the way to Prussia. She arrived in Neufahrwassar on 25 May. Initial sea trials revealed that the ship handled better than expected, but her ram bow created a very large wave that flooded water into the forward gun position. The ship was lightly grounded on 3 June, which required minor repairs. She failed to reach her contract speed of 12 knots (22 km/h; 14 mph), so Arman accepted a price reduced by 100,000 francs. She was renamed on 29 October as Prinz Adalbert, after Prince Adalbert, one of the creators of the fleet, and she was formally commissioned on 10 June 1866; she was the second ironclad acquired by the Prussian Navy, following the turret ship Arminius.

=== Prussian service ===
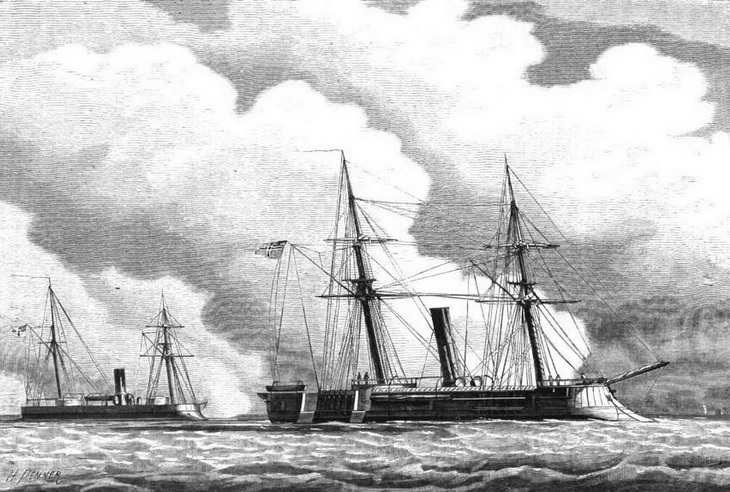
Prinz Adalbert (right) and Arminius (left)

She was found to be in poor condition on entering service with the fleet, which itself was in poor logistical condition. Though commissioned on 10 June, still under the command of MacLean, he had to remain ashore for the first two days of his official service as the ship's captain. His executive officer was not available until 15 June, and the first group of sailors arrived to find no food available. MacLean had to provide them an advance on their pay so they could buy food in town. Also, they were provided with just one set of uniforms. These deficiencies were emblematic of the state of the Prussian Navy in the early 1860s. She went to sea for the first time under the Prussian flag on 12 July, carrying a load of munitions to the fortress at Friedrichsort outside Kiel. She then left for the North Sea, but encountered bad weather on the way and had to seek shelter in Mandal, Norway. Prinz Adalbert was found to leak badly during the voyage, and upon entering the Weser, an inspection revealed her hull seams to have been caulked poorly. These operations coincided with the Austro-Prussian War; the ship was nominally under the command of Vizeadmiral (Vice Admiral) Eduard von Jachmann, but due to the lack of opponents in the North and Baltic Seas, coupled with the ship's bad condition, she saw no action during the war.

The ship did not last long in service due to a lengthy list of defects. These included general poor construction, defects with her armor plate, significant gaps between the armor and hull timbers, and galvanic corrosion between the iron armor and copper sheathing below the waterline. She was also unable to use her sailing rig. Much of the fault lay with the use of low-quality wood in the construction of her hull. These problems necessitated significant refurbishment, and she was decommissioned on 25 October at the naval depot at Geestemünde in 1868–1869. Her armor plating had to be removed and reinstalled, a breakwater was installed at the stern of the ship, and the main mast had to be relocated. She was re-rigged to a schooner rig during this refit. During this period, a London-based company approached Prussia in an attempt to purchase the ship for the Greek Navy. Jachmann approved the sale, but the Admiralty rejected the offer. Despite the repairs, Prinz Adalbert continued to suffer from severe leaking throughout her short career and she remained a poor sailing vessel.

Prinz Adalbert returned to service on 14 April 1869, and she was assigned as a guard ship based in the lower Elbe. She was stationed in Altona, where she was visited frequently by the citizens of Hamburg. On 19 June, the ship sailed to the future site of the naval base at Wilhelmshaven for a ceremony marking the beginning of construction. In May 1870, Prinz Adalbert, despite still leaking badly, joined the three armored frigates Friedrich Carl, Kronprinz, and König Wilhelm for a visit to Britain, though Friedrich Carl was damaged after running aground in the Great Belt. Prinz Adalbert, König Wilhelm, and Kronprinz continued on to Plymouth while Friedrich Carl returned to Kiel for repairs. The latter vessel quickly rejoined the ships there and on 1 July they departed for a training cruise to Fayal in the Azores, Portugal. But as tensions with France over the Hohenzollern candidacy for the vacant Spanish throne. While they cruised east through the English Channel, they learned of the increasing likelihood of war, and the Prussians detached Prinz Adalbert to Dartmouth to be kept informed of events. The rest of the squadron joined her there on 13 July, and as war seemed to be imminent, the Prussians ended the cruise and returned to home. Kronprinz had to take Prinz Adalbert under tow for the voyage due to the latter's slow speed.

The ships arrived back in Wilhelmshaven on 16 July, three days before France declared war on Prussia over the Ems Dispatch, initiating the Franco-Prussian War of 1870–1871. The greatly numerically inferior Prussian Navy assumed a defensive posture against a naval blockade imposed by the French Navy. For the duration of the conflict, Prinz Adalbert served as a harbor guard ship in Hamburg, leading a flotilla of four gunboats and seven torpedo boats equipped with spar torpedoes. From July, she came under the command of KL Friedrich von Hacke. She made several sorties into the North Sea, but did not encounter French warships. After the end of the war, Prinz Adalbert returned to her previous duty as guard ship in the Elbe. The ship was leaking so badly by this time that her pumps had to be run constantly to avoid foundering. Her timber hull was found to be rotten in 1871, which forced her decommissioning on 28 October, from what was now the Kaiserliche Marine (Imperial Navy) of the German Empire. The navy considered using the ship as a training ship for engine room crews, but her poor condition, coupled with the fact that her outdated machinery was not particularly useful for training purposes, led to the abandonment of the idea. She was removed from service on 23 October 1871 and disarmed in 1875–1876. The ship was formally stricken from the naval register on 28 May 1878. She was broken up that year in Wilhelmshaven, and her engines and armor plate were removed and reused.
