= SMS Tiger (1860) =

Prussian gunboat

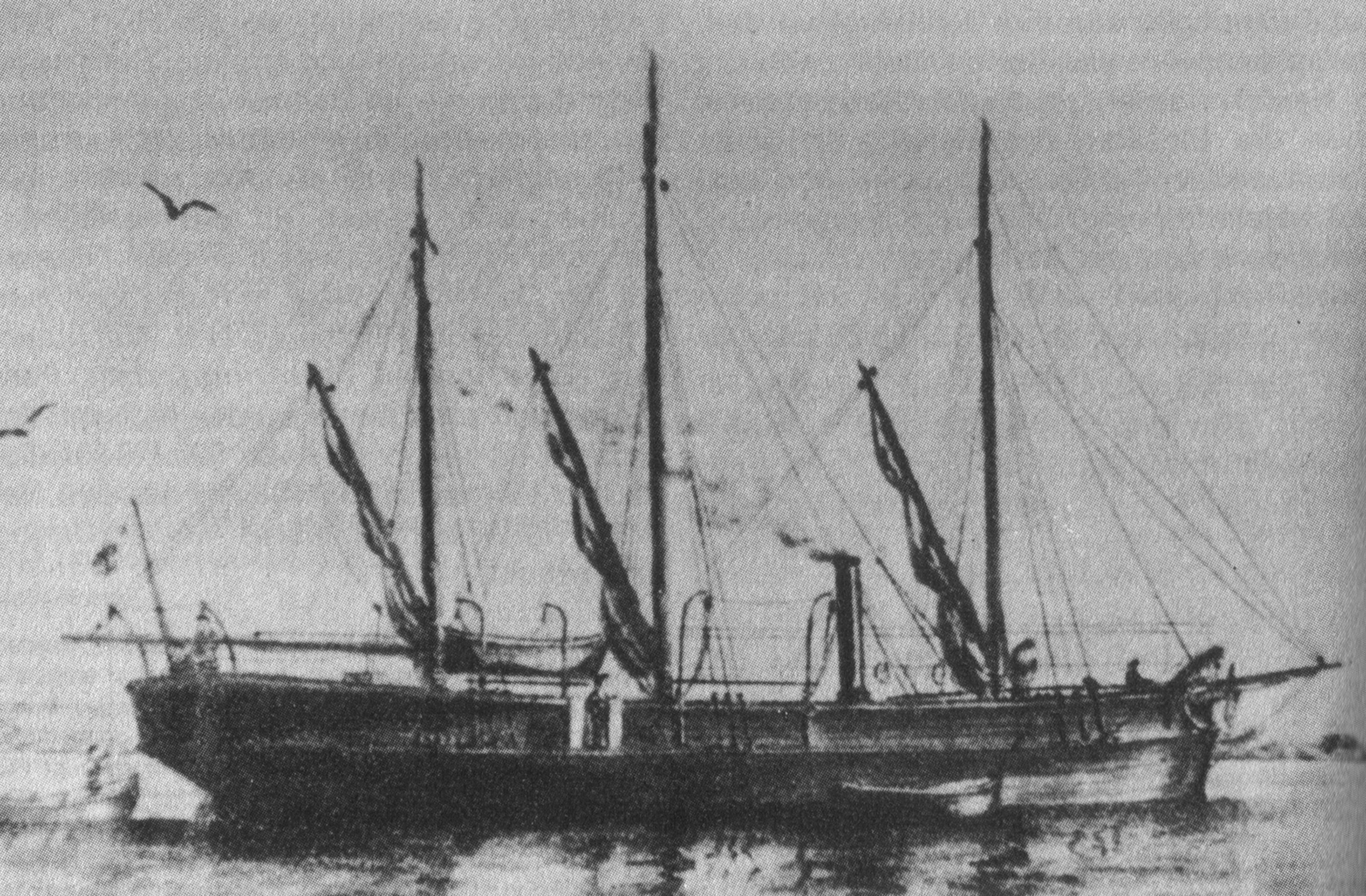
- Tiger's sister Fuchs

History
- Name: Tiger
- Namesake: Tiger
- Operator: Prussian Navy; Imperial German Navy
- Builder: Zieske, Stettin
- Laid down: 1859
- Launched: 14 February 1860
- Commissioned: 3 March 1864
- Decommissioned: 16 August 1876
- Stricken: 9 January 1877

General characteristics
- Type: Jäger-class gunboat
- Displacement: Design: 237 t (233 long tons); Full load: 283 t (279 long tons)
- Length: 41.2 m (135 ft 2 in)
- Beam: 6.69 m (21 ft 11 in)
- Draft: 2.2 m (7 ft 3 in)
- Installed power: 4 × boilers; 220 PS (220 ihp)
- Propulsion: 2 × marine steam engines; 1 × screw propeller
- Speed: 9 knots (17 km/h; 10 mph)
- Complement: 2 officers; 38 enlisted
- Armament: 1 × 24-pounder gun; 2 × 12-pounder guns

SMS Tiger was a steam gunboat of the Jäger class built for the Prussian Navy in the late 1850s and early 1860s. The ship was ordered as part of a program to strengthen Prussia's coastal defense forces, then oriented against neighboring Denmark. She was armed with a battery of three guns. The ship saw very little activity during her career. She was activated during the three wars of German unification: the Second Schleswig War against Denmark in 1864, the Austro-Prussian War in 1866, and the Franco-Prussian War in 1870. She saw no action during the first and last conflict, but she took part in operations against the Kingdom of Hanover during the Austro-Prussian War. Tiger served in a variety of roles in the mid-1870s and was eventually discarded in 1877. The ship was thereafter used as a storage barge in Wilhelmshaven. Her ultimate fate is unknown.

== Design ==
Profile drawing showing the internal arrangement of the class

The Jäger class of steam gunboats came about as a result of a program to strengthen the Prussian Navy in the late 1850s in the aftermath of the First Schleswig War against Denmark. The wartime Reichsflotte (Imperial Fleet) had been dissolved, but tensions with Denmark remained high. In 1859, Prince Regent Wilhelm approved a construction program for some fifty-two gunboats to be built over the next fifteen years, which began with the fifteen vessels of the Jäger class. These ships were intended to defend the Prussian coast in the event of another war with Denmark.

Tiger was 41.2 meters (135 ft 2 in) long overall, with a beam of 6.69 m (21 ft 11 in) and a draft of 2.2 m (7 ft 3 in). She displaced 237 metric tons (233 long tons) normally and 283 t (279 long tons) at full load. The ship's crew consisted of 2 officers and 38 enlisted men. She was powered by a pair of marine steam engines that drove one 3-bladed screw propeller, with steam provided by four coal-fired trunk boilers, which gave her a top speed of 9.1 knots (16.9 km/h; 10.5 mph) at 220 metric horsepower (220 ihp). As built, she was equipped with a three-masted schooner rig, which was later removed. The Jäger-class gunboats handled badly and tended to take on water in heavy seas. The ship was armed with a battery of one rifled 24-pounder muzzle-loading gun and two rifled 12-pounder muzzle-loading guns.

== Service history ==
Illustration of a Jäger-class gunboat

Tiger, named after the eponymous large cat, was built at the Zieske shipyard in Stettin. Her keel was laid down in 1859 and she was launched on 14 February 1860. At the launching ceremony, some spectators got too close to the ship as it slid down the slipway and they were injured. After the ship was completed later that year, she was moved to Stralsund, where she was taken out of service and laid up on the nearby island of Dänholm. While out of service, her copper sheathing was removed from her hull so ventilation holes could be cut into the outer planking. Her entire propulsion system, including the masts and the funnel, was removed and a roof was erected over the hull to keep the elements out.

The ship remained out of service for the next few years. On 8 December 1863, the Prussian Navy ordered the fleet to mobilize, as tensions between Prussia and Denmark over the Schleswig–Holstein question rose sharply. Mobilization meant that Tiger and the rest of the gunboats at Stralsund would have to be reconstructed. Tiger was commissioned for the first time on 3 March 1864, shortly after the start of the Second Schleswig War. She was assigned to II Flotilla Division along with several other gunboats. The Prussian gunboat divisions were assigned to guard the main Prussian ports on the Baltic coast—namely Stralsund, Stettin, and Swinemünde—after the Royal Danish Navy imposed a blockade of the ports. Commanded by Leutnant zur See (LzS—Lieutenant at Sea) Heinrich Kühne, she saw no action during the war, and on 14 October, she was decommissioned again at Dänholm. Six days later, the combatants signed the Treaty of Vienna, formally ending the war.

The ship was recommissioned again on 3 April 1866, and was moved to Kiel on 11 April as tensions between Prussia and the Austrian Empire rose. On 12 May, the Prussian Navy issued mobilization orders, and Tiger was sent from the Black Sea to the mouth of the Elbe river on Prussia's North Sea coast. There, she joined a small squadron led by the ironclad Arminius, which was commanded by Reinhold von Werner and included the aviso Loreley and the gunboats Cyclop and Wolf. On 15 June, Arminius, Tiger, and Cyclop covered the crossing of the Elbe river by General Edwin von Manteuffel and some 13,500 soldiers to attack the city of Hanover. The crossing took place in the span of ten hours, and Werner's flotilla later covered the crossing of additional forces to support Manteuffel, including cavalry and artillery units. Arminius, Cyclop, and Tiger sent men ashore at Brunshausen, where they spiked the guns of an abandoned coastal artillery battery.

Werner then detached Tiger and Wolf to bombard the batteries at the mouth of the Elbe. The Prussian army, supported by Werner's flotilla, had succeeded in capturing all of the major fortifications guarding the Elbe, Weser, and Ems rivers by 22 June, and other naval forces from the Baltic and Mediterranean Sea had arrived to further strengthen the Prussian fleet. Tiger and the other vessels thereafter patrolled the coast of Ostfriesland to show the flag to demonstrate Prussia's naval superiority. At Leer, Tiger seized Königin Marie, the royal yacht of King George V of Hanover. Late in the war, Tiger was sent to serve as the guard ship at Altona. By the end of the month, the Prussian army had decisively defeated the Austrians at Königgrätz and ended the war. Following the signing of the peace treaty that formally ended the conflict, Werner's flotilla was disbanded on 23 August, and Tiger returned to Kiel in September. She was decommissioned there on 7 January 1867.

Tiger next recommissioned on 24 July 1870, shortly after the start of the Franco-Prussian War, under the command of LzS August von Thomsen. She was initially used to defend Thiessow, but on 2 August, she was moved to the Kieler Förde to defend the approaches to Kiel, including guarding a barrier at Friedrichsort. She saw no combat during the war, and was decommissioned on 29 April 1871 at Kiel. She was modernized there the following year, which included replacing her main gun with a more modern, iron 15 cm (5.9 in) RK L/22 gun. Her sailing rig was removed and a simple pole mast was fitted for signaling purposes. She was recommissioned on 22 August 1872, but she remained in service only so long as to move the ship to Wilhelmshaven, where she was taken out of service on 9 September. In 1874, she was recommissioned to serve as the tender for the artillery training ship Renown from 3 March to 24 October, when she was placed back in reserve. During that period, LzS Fritz Rötger commanded the ship. Over the winter of 1873–1874, the boilers from her sister Hyäne, which were in better condition, were installed aboard Tiger after the former vessel was discarded. Tiger thereafter recommissioned on 1 April 1875, under the command of LzS Hermann Kirchhoff, for another stint as tender for Renown, which ended on 29 September. The year 1876 followed the same pattern, being recommissioned temporarily for tender duty, but that year her active period lasted from 1 April until 16 August. LzS August Gruner served as the ship's last commander during the 1876 training cycle. She was then struck from the naval register on 9 January 1877, renamed Minenprahm Nr. 4 (Mine Barge No. 4), and used as a storage hulk in Wilhelmshaven. Her ultimate fate is unknown.
