= SMS Natter (1860) =

Prussian gunboat

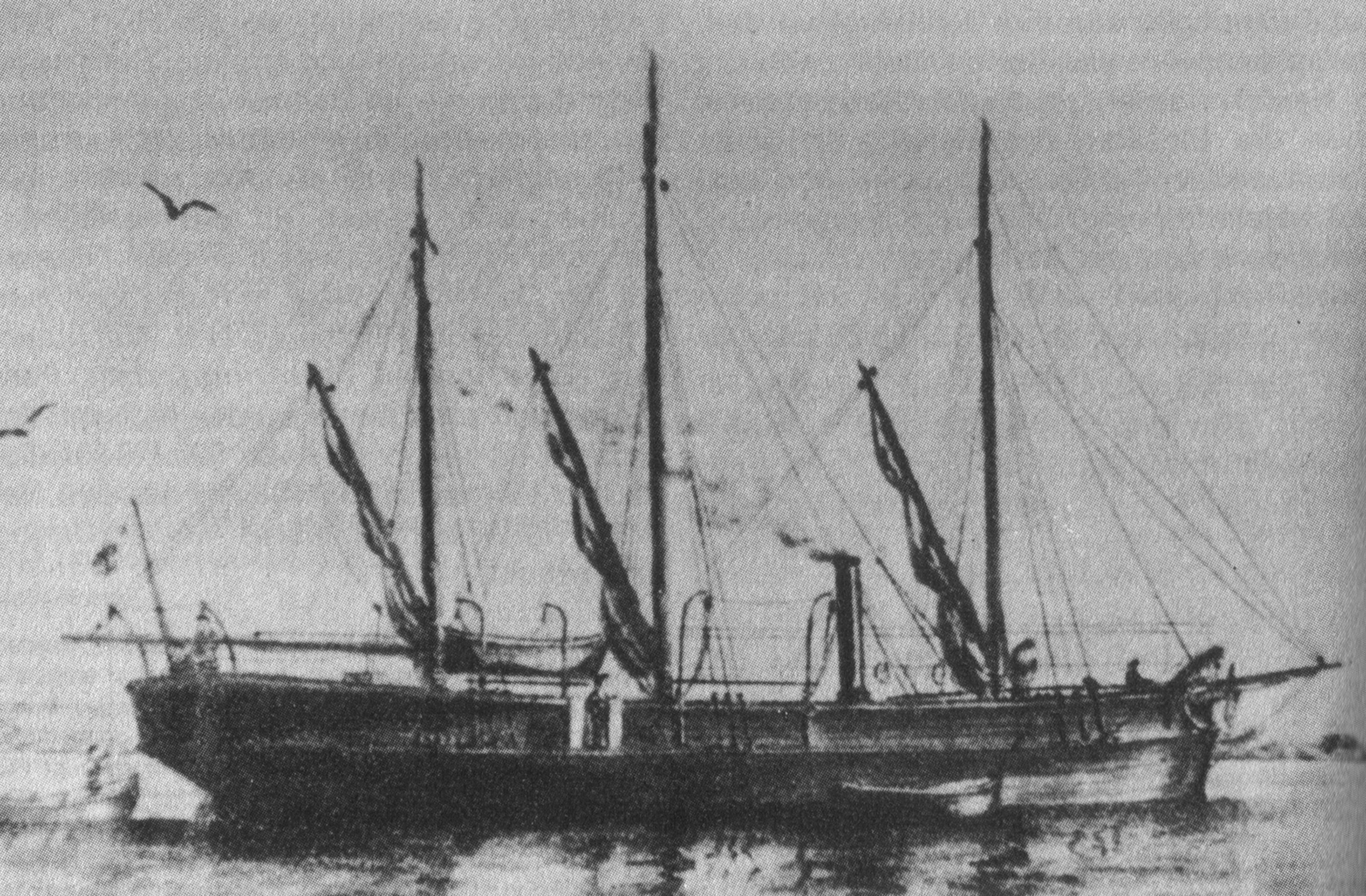
- Natter's sister Fuchs

History
- Name: Natter
- Operator: Prussian Navy; Imperial German Navy
- Builder: Lübke, Wolgast
- Laid down: 1859
- Launched: 14 February 1860
- Commissioned: 1 March 1864
- Decommissioned: 19 September 1873
- Stricken: 7 September 1880

General characteristics
- Type: Jäger-class gunboat
- Displacement: Design: 237 t (233 long tons); Full load: 283 t (279 long tons)
- Length: 41.2 m (135 ft 2 in)
- Beam: 6.69 m (21 ft 11 in)
- Draft: 2.2 m (7 ft 3 in)
- Installed power: 4 × boilers; 220 PS (220 ihp)
- Propulsion: 2 × marine steam engines; 1 × screw propeller
- Speed: 9 knots (17 km/h; 10 mph)
- Complement: 2 officers; 38 enlisted
- Armament: 1 × 24-pounder gun; 2 × 12-pounder guns

SMS Natter was a steam gunboat of the Jäger class built for the Prussian Navy in the late 1850s and early 1860s. The ship was ordered as part of a program to strengthen Prussia's coastal defense forces, then oriented against neighboring Denmark. She was armed with a battery of three guns. The ship saw very little activity during her career. She was activated during the Second Schleswig War against Denmark in 1864 and the Franco-Prussian War in 1870, being used to defend the Prussian coast. She saw no action against enemy forces in either conflict, however. Natter largely remained out of service until her disposal in 1880, but her ultimate fate is unknown.

== Design ==
Profile drawing showing the internal arrangement of the class

The Jäger class of steam gunboats came about as a result of a program to strengthen the Prussian Navy in the late 1850s in the aftermath of the First Schleswig War against Denmark. The wartime Reichsflotte (Imperial Fleet) had been dissolved, but tensions with Denmark remained high. In 1859, Prince Regent Wilhelm approved a construction program for some fifty-two gunboats to be built over the next fifteen years, which began with the fifteen vessels of the Jäger class. These ships were intended to defend the Prussian coast in the event of another war with Denmark.

Natter was 41.2 meters (135 ft 2 in) long overall, with a beam of 6.69 m (21 ft 11 in) and a draft of 2.2 m (7 ft 3 in). She displaced 237 metric tons (233 long tons) normally and 283 t (279 long tons) at full load. The ship's crew consisted of 2 officers and 38 enlisted men. She was powered by a pair of marine steam engines that drove one 3-bladed screw propeller, with steam provided by four coal-fired trunk boilers, which gave her a top speed of 9.1 knots (16.9 km/h; 10.5 mph) at 220 metric horsepower (220 ihp). As built, she was equipped with a three-masted schooner rig, which was later removed. The Jäger-class gunboats handled badly and tended to take on water in heavy seas. The ship was armed with a battery of one rifled 24-pounder muzzle-loading gun and two rifled 12-pounder muzzle-loading guns.

== Service history ==
Illustration of a Jäger-class gunboat

The keel for Natter was laid down at the Lübke shipyard in Wolgast in 1859 and she was launched on 14 February 1860. After her completion, she was moved to Stralsund, where she was laid up at the nearby island of Dänholm. While out of service, her copper sheathing was removed from her hull so ventilation holes could be cut into the outer planking. Her entire propulsion system, including the masts and the funnel, was removed and a roof was erected over the hull to keep the elements out.

The ship remained out of service for the next few years. On 8 December 1863, the Prussian Navy ordered the fleet to mobilize, as tensions between Prussia and Denmark over the Schleswig–Holstein question rose sharply. Mobilization meant that Natter and the rest of the gunboats at Stralsund would have to be reconstructed. Natter was commissioned for the first time on 1 March 1864, under the command of Fahnrich zur See (Ensign) Carl von Eisendecher, shortly after the start of the Second Schleswig War. The Prussian gunboat divisions were assigned to guard the main Prussian ports on the Baltic coast, namely Stralsund, Stettin, and Swinemünde after the Royal Danish Navy imposed a blockade of the ports. Eisendecher remained aboard the ship for only a short period, and later that month he was replaced by Leutnant zur See (Lieutenant at Sea) Second Class Eduard von Knorr. She was assigned to II Flotilla Division, along with several other gunboats. Records are unclear, but according to the historians Hildebrand, Röhr, and Steinmetz, Natter probably served as the divisional flagship during the war. She saw no action during the conflict, and she was taken back out of service in October and was stored at Dänholm. On 20 October, the combatants signed the Treaty of Vienna, formally ending the war.

On 19 July 1870, France declared war on Prussia, initiating the Franco-Prussian War. Leutnant zur See (Lieutenant at Sea) Otto von Diederichs was sent to reactivate Natter that day, and the crew readied the vessel to be recommissioned on 24 July. The ship was sent through the Eider Canal to move to the North Sea in company with her sister ships Salamander and Jäger, initially to join the forces guarding the entrance to the Jade Bight. After arriving there, she received orders to move further east to defend the mouth of the Ems river, along with her sister Wespe. On 2 August, Natter sailed up the Ems to Leer before rejoining Wespe. The two ships were planned to operate as part of the coastal defense system in the area, which also included coastal artillery batteries on the island of Borkum, and two infantry regiments. Natter saw no combat during the war, mainly because the French squadron in the North Sea focused its attention on the area near Helgoland. On 10 September, Natter and Wespe went to sea to observe the withdrawal of French warships from Prussia's coast. The gunboats nevertheless patrolled in the Ems area for the next several months.

An armistice ended the fighting on 28 January 1871, and in February, the Prussian fleet commander, Eduard von Jachmann, ordered Natter and Wespe to join the main fleet at Wilhelmshaven. She was then decommissioned at Wilhelmshaven on 12 April 1871. She was modernized soon thereafter, receiving a more modern 15 cm (5.9 in) RK L/22 gun. Her sailing rig was removed and a simple pole mast was fitted for signaling purposes. Natter was recommissioned again on 16 April 1873 to serve as a tender for the artillery training ship Renown, which lasted until 19 September. She was then decommissioned again, and the ship saw no further active service. She nevertheless remained in the fleet's inventory until she was struck from the naval register on 7 September 1880. The details of her disposal are unknown.
