= SMS Pfeil (1860) =

Prussian gunboat

- Illustration of a Jäger-class gunboat

History
- Name: Pfeil
- Operator: Prussian Navy; Imperial German Navy
- Builder: Lübke, Wolgast
- Laid down: 1859
- Launched: 14 February 1860
- Commissioned: 11 February 1864
- Decommissioned: 12 April 1871
- Stricken: 19 March 1872

General characteristics
- Type: Jäger-class gunboat
- Displacement: Design: 237 t (233 long tons); Full load: 283 t (279 long tons)
- Length: 41.2 m (135 ft 2 in)
- Beam: 6.69 m (21 ft 11 in)
- Draft: 2.2 m (7 ft 3 in)
- Installed power: 4 × boilers; 220 PS (220 ihp)
- Propulsion: 2 × marine steam engines; 1 × screw propeller
- Speed: 9 knots (17 km/h; 10 mph)
- Complement: 2 officers; 38 enlisted
- Armament: 1 × 24-pounder gun; 2 × 12-pounder guns

SMS Pfeil was a steam gunboat of the Jäger class built for the Prussian Navy in the late 1850s and early 1860s. The ship was ordered as part of a program to strengthen Prussia's coastal defense forces, then oriented against neighboring Denmark. She was armed with a battery of three guns. The ship saw very little activity during her career. She was activated during the Second Schleswig War against Denmark in 1864, and she saw brief action during the Battle of Jasmund on 17 March. She next recommissioned during the Franco-Prussian War in 1870, but she did not engage any French warships. In poor condition by the early 1870s, she was struck from the naval register in 1872 and converted into a storage hulk. Her ultimate fate is unknown.

== Design ==
Profile drawing showing the internal arrangement of the class

The Jäger class of steam gunboats came about as a result of a program to strengthen the Prussian Navy in the late 1850s in the aftermath of the First Schleswig War against Denmark. The wartime Reichsflotte (Imperial Fleet) had been dissolved, but tensions with Denmark remained high. In 1859, Prince Regent Wilhelm approved a construction program for some fifty-two gunboats to be built over the next fifteen years, which began with the fifteen vessels of the Jäger class. These ships were intended to defend the Prussian coast in the event of another war with Denmark.

Pfeil was 41.2 meters (135 ft 2 in) long overall, with a beam of 6.69 m (21 ft 11 in) and a draft of 2.2 m (7 ft 3 in). She displaced 237 metric tons (233 long tons) normally and 283 t (279 long tons) at full load. The ship's crew consisted of 2 officers and 38 enlisted men. She was powered by a pair of marine steam engines that drove one 3-bladed screw propeller, with steam provided by four coal-fired trunk boilers, which gave her a top speed of 9.1 knots (16.9 km/h; 10.5 mph) at 220 metric horsepower (220 ihp). As built, she was equipped with a three-masted schooner rig, which was later removed. The Jäger-class gunboats handled badly and tended to take on water in heavy seas. The ship was armed with a battery of one rifled 24-pounder muzzle-loading gun and two rifled 12-pounder muzzle-loading guns.

== Service history ==
Pfeil was built at the Lübke shipyard in Wolgast. Her keel was laid down in 1859 and she was launched on 14 February 1860. The ship was provisionally named Donner during construction, but on 18 October 1859, she was renamed Pfeil. After her completion in late 1860, she was moved to Stralsund, where she was laid up at the nearby island of Dänholm. While out of service, her copper sheathing was removed from her hull so ventilation holes could be cut into the outer planking. Her entire propulsion system, including the masts and the funnel, was removed and a roof was erected over the hull to protect the vessel from bad weather.

The ship remained out of service for the next few years. On 8 December 1863, the Prussian Navy ordered the fleet to mobilize, as tensions between Prussia and Denmark over the Schleswig–Holstein question rose sharply. Mobilization meant that Pfeil and the rest of the gunboats at Stralsund would have to be reconstructed. Following the outbreak of the Second Schleswig War in February 1864, Pfeil was commissioned for the first time on 11 February as the Prussian Navy mobilized for war; she was initially commanded by Fahnrich zur See (Ensign) Otto Zembsch. She was assigned to I Flotilla Division, along with several other gunboats. The Prussian gunboat divisions were assigned to guard the main Prussian ports on the Baltic coast, namely Stralsund, Stettin, and Swinemünde after the Royal Danish Navy imposed a blockade of the ports.

The flotilla was deployed on 17 March to support Captain Eduard von Jachmann's corvettes as they attempted to break the Danish blockade, but the gunboats were only lightly engaged during the ensuing Battle of Jasmund. Jachmann had ordered them to take up a position closer to land to cover a potential withdrawal, and so they were too far to take part in the main action. Nevertheless, as the Danish steam frigate Tordenskjold arrived to reinforce the main squadron, Pfeil and the other gunboats fired on her from afar. Tordenskjold's commander ignored the gunboats and continued south to join the fight with Jachmann's corvettes, firing only a few broadsides at the gunboats in passing, with neither side scoring any hits. As the Danes continued south in pursuit of Jachmann's ships, the gunboats withdrew back to Stralsund, though they had to take Hay under tow after her engines broke down. Pfeil participated in a sortie into the Baltic on 6 May, which resulted in no combat with Danish vessels. The gunboat flotillas were thereafter reorganized and Pfeil served as the division flagship through the end of the war. Fighting ended with an armistice on 20 July. From September, Kapitänleutnant (Captain Lieutenant) Adolph Berger replaced Zembsch as the ship's captain. She was then decommissioned on 13 October and towed back to Dänholm. Thirteen days later, the combatants signed the Treaty of Vienna, formally ending the war.

Pfeil next recommissioned on 3 May 1869 to serve as the guard ship in Danzig. She was also used as the tender for the Königliche Werft (Royal Shipyard) there. During this period, Korvettenkapitän (Corvette Captain) Otto Livonius commanded the ship from September to October 1869, and then again from January to February 1870. On 16 July 1870, after the start of the Franco-Prussian War, she sailed west, stopping in Swinemünde on the way to pass through the Eider Canal to the North Sea. By early August, she had arrived at the mouth of the Elbe river, where she was stationed as a guard ship as part of a coastal defense flotilla. In early 1871, she was moved to the flotilla stationed in Jade Bight, where she remained until 12 April, when she was removed from active service. By that time, the war with France had ended; fighting had largely ceased in January, and the Treaty of Frankfurt formally ended the war in May. Also during this period, the German states had proclaimed the creation of the German Empire, and the ships of the old Prussian Navy passed into what was now the Imperial German Navy. During an inspection of the hull in early 1872, significant rotting was discovered. The ship was accordingly struck from the naval register on 19 March. She was initially renamed Minenprahm P (Mine Barge) and was converted into a storage hulk for naval mines. The ship was renamed Minenprahm Nr. 2 in 1878, but details of her ultimate fate are unknown.
