= SMS Sperber (1860) =

Prussian gunboat

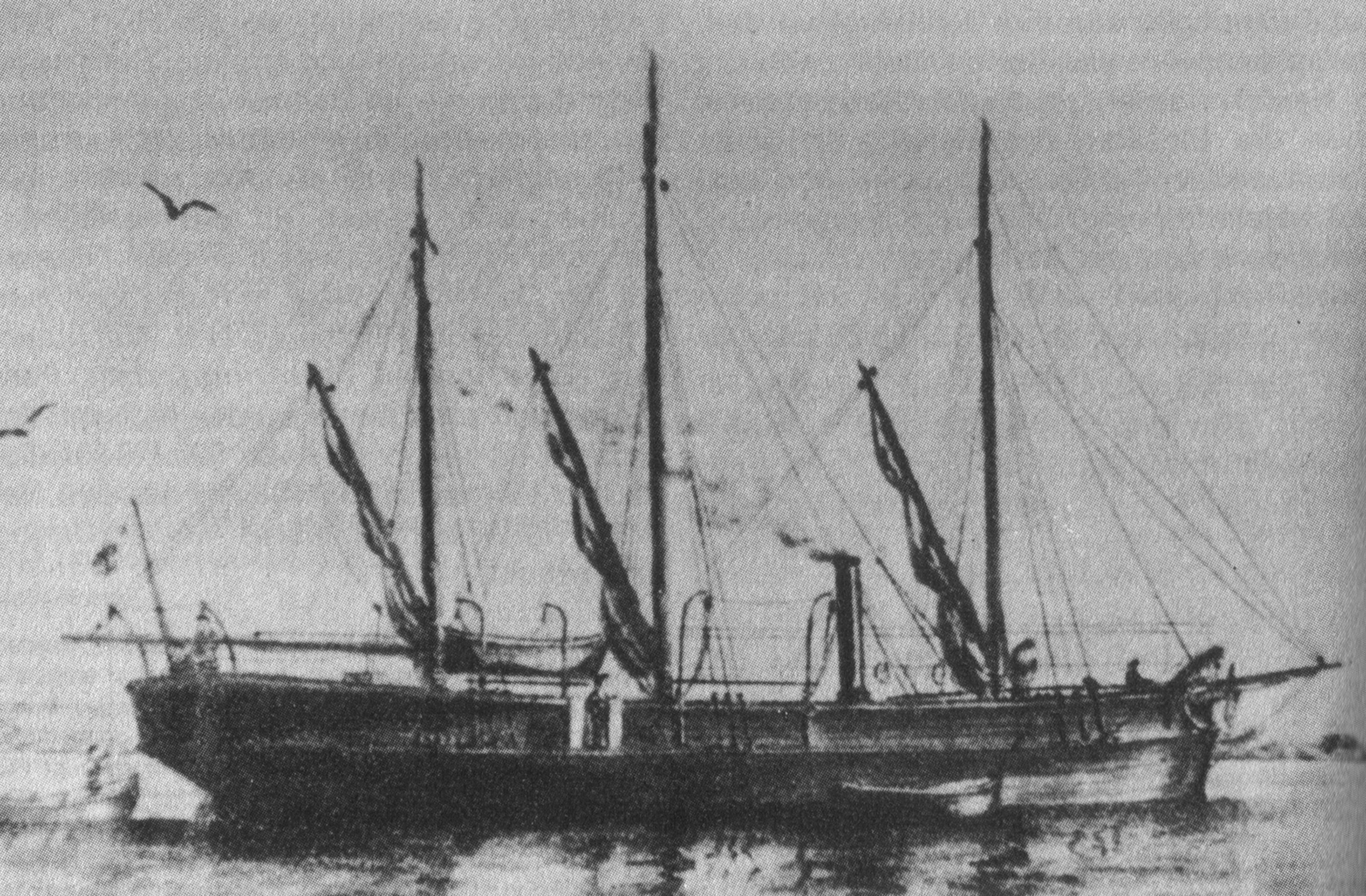
- Sperber's sister Fuchs

History
- Name: Sperber
- Operator: Prussian Navy; Imperial German Navy
- Builder: Domcke, Grabow
- Laid down: 1859
- Launched: 14 February 1860
- Commissioned: 11 February 1864
- Decommissioned: 31 May 1877
- Stricken: 12 November 1878

General characteristics
- Type: Jäger-class gunboat
- Displacement: Design: 237 t (233 long tons); Full load: 283 t (279 long tons)
- Length: 41.2 m (135 ft 2 in)
- Beam: 6.69 m (21 ft 11 in)
- Draft: 2.2 m (7 ft 3 in)
- Installed power: 4 × boilers; 220 PS (220 ihp)
- Propulsion: 2 × marine steam engines; 1 × screw propeller
- Speed: 9 knots (17 km/h; 10 mph)
- Complement: 2 officers; 38 enlisted
- Armament: 1 × 24-pounder gun; 2 × 12-pounder guns

SMS Sperber was a steam gunboat of the Jäger class built for the Prussian Navy in the late 1850s and early 1860s. The ship was ordered as part of a program to strengthen Prussia's coastal defense forces, then oriented against neighboring Denmark. She was armed with a battery of three guns. The ship saw very little activity during her career. She was activated during the Second Schleswig War against Denmark in 1864 and the Franco-Prussian War in 1870, being used to defend the Prussian coast. She saw no action against enemy forces in either conflict, however. Sperber was used intermittently as a tender in the 1870s, and was struck from the naval register in 1878. She was then used as a barge in Kiel, but her eventual fate is unknown.

== Design ==
Profile drawing showing the internal arrangement of the class

The Jäger class of steam gunboats came about as a result of a program to strengthen the Prussian Navy in the late 1850s in the aftermath of the First Schleswig War against Denmark. The wartime Reichsflotte (Imperial Fleet) had been dissolved, but tensions with Denmark remained high. In 1859, Prince Regent Wilhelm approved a construction program for some fifty-two gunboats to be built over the next fifteen years, which began with the fifteen vessels of the Jäger class. These ships were intended to defend the Prussian coast in the event of another war with Denmark.

Sperber was 41.2 meters (135 ft 2 in) long overall, with a beam of 6.69 m (21 ft 11 in) and a draft of 2.2 m (7 ft 3 in). She displaced 237 metric tons (233 long tons) normally and 283 t (279 long tons) at full load. The ship's crew consisted of 2 officers and 38 enlisted men. She was powered by a pair of marine steam engines that drove one 3-bladed screw propeller, with steam provided by four coal-fired trunk boilers, which gave her a top speed of 9.1 knots (16.9 km/h; 10.5 mph) at 220 metric horsepower (220 ihp). As built, she was equipped with a three-masted schooner rig, which was later removed. The Jäger-class gunboats handled badly and tended to take on water in heavy seas. The gunboat was armed with a battery of one rifled 24-pounder muzzle-loading gun and two rifled 12-pounder muzzle-loading guns.

== Service history ==
Illustration of a Jäger-class gunboat

Sperber was laid down at the Domcke shipyard in Grabow in 1859 and launched on 14 February 1860. The ship, which was named after the sparrowhawk, was moved to Stralsund after completion later that year, where she was laid up on the island of Dänholm, where all of her sisters were also placed in reserve. While out of service, her copper sheathing was removed from her hull so ventilation holes could be cut into the outer planking. Her entire propulsion system, including the masts and the funnel, was removed and a roof was erected over the hull to keep the elements out.

=== Second Schleswig War ===
The ship remained out of service for the next few years. On 8 December 1863, the Prussian Navy ordered the fleet to mobilize, as tensions between Prussia and Denmark over the Schleswig–Holstein question rose sharply. Mobilization meant that Sperber and the rest of the gunboats at Stralsund would have to be reconstructed. She was recommissioned shortly after the outbreak of the Second Schleswig War in February 1864; Sperber was commissioned on 11 February and was assigned to III Flotilla Division. The Prussian gunboat divisions were assigned to guard the main Prussian ports on the Baltic coast, namely Stralsund, Stettin, and Swinemünde after the Royal Danish Navy imposed a blockade of the ports. III and V Divisions were based in Stralsund to defend the Kubitzer Bodden and the Bay of Greifswald.

On 17 March, Sperber was sent to take her sister Hay under tow after her engines broke down while withdrawing from the Battle of Jasmund. In the aftermath of the battle, Prince Adalbert, the Prussian naval commander, ordered all five gunboat divisions to concentrate at Stralsund on 29 March to support the Prussian Army's invasion of the island of Als, but bad weather prevented the vessels from taking part in the operation. Following a ceasefire in May, the Prussian fleet held a naval review in Swinemünde for King Wilhelm I on 6 June; the aviso Loreley led the gunboat divisions during the review. A ceasefire took effect on 20 July, which led to negotiations to end the war. On 20 October, Sperber was decommissioned and placed back in reserve at Dänholm. The same day, the combatants signed the Treaty of Vienna, formally ending the war.

=== Later career ===
Sperber was reactivated on 29 June 1869, under the command of Leutnant zur See (LzS—Lieutenant at Sea) Gustav Stempel, for a period of testing that concluded on 9 July. She was then placed back out of service at Kiel. She was recommissioned next on 19 July 1870, the day the Franco-Prussian War started, under the command of LzS Franz von Kyckbusch. She was immediately sent to the North Sea, passing through the Danish Straits and arriving in Cuxhaven on 28 July. She then moved west to join the ships guarding the entrance to Jade Bight. On 12 October, she was decommissioned at Geestemünde.

Sperber was briefly recommissioned on 5 August 1872 to move the ship back to Kiel via the Eider Canal, where she was decommissioned on 22 August. There, she was modernized with a more modern 15 cm (5.9 in) RK L/22 gun. Her sailing rig was removed and a simple pole mast was fitted for signaling purposes. The ship was recommissioned on 15 June 1875 for use as a tender, supporting the Marinestation der Ostsee (Naval Station of the Baltic Sea). The ship's first command during this period was Kapitänleutnant (KL—Captain Lieutenant) Albert von Seckendorff; LzS Hans Sack replaced him in August 1875, serving until May 1876. KL Felix von Bendemann commanded the ship from September 1876 to April 1877. Sperber served in as a tender until 31 May 1877, when she was withdrawn from service for the last time. She was struck from the naval register on 12 November 1878 and thereafter used as a barge in Kiel. Her ultimate fate is unknown.
