= SMS Hyäne (1860) =

Prussian gunboat

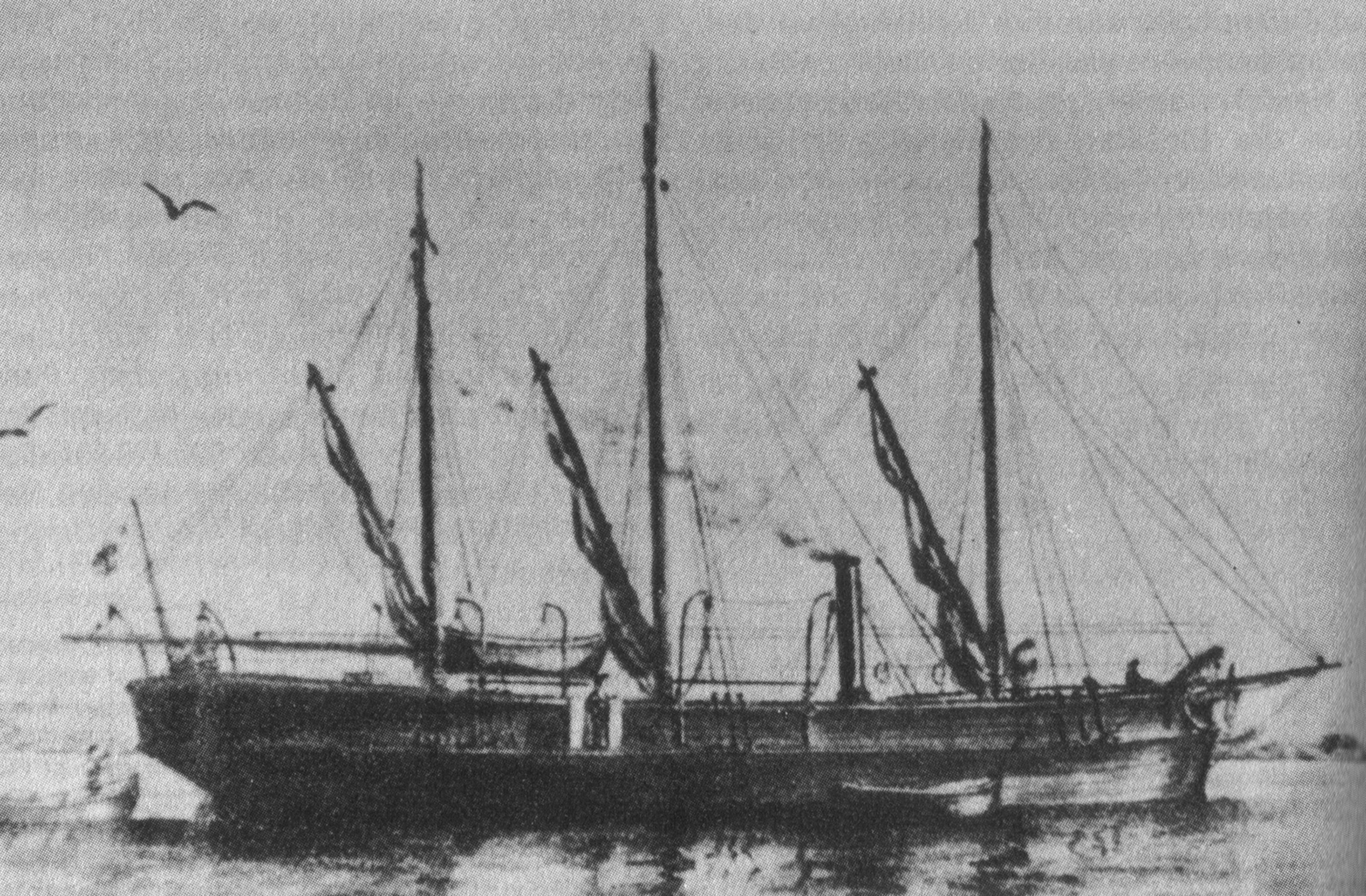
- Hyäne's sister Fuchs

History
- Name: Hyäne
- Operator: Prussian Navy; Imperial German Navy
- Builder: Keier & Devrient, Danzig
- Laid down: 1859
- Launched: April 1860
- Commissioned: 1860
- Decommissioned: 20 May 1871
- Stricken: 17 July 1873
- Fate: Sunk as a target ship

General characteristics
- Type: Jäger-class gunboat
- Displacement: Design: 237 t (233 long tons); Full load: 283 t (279 long tons)
- Length: 41.2 m (135 ft 2 in)
- Beam: 6.69 m (21 ft 11 in)
- Draft: 2.2 m (7 ft 3 in)
- Installed power: 4 × boilers; 220 PS (220 ihp)
- Propulsion: 2 × marine steam engines; 1 × screw propeller
- Speed: 9 knots (17 km/h; 10 mph)
- Complement: 2 officers; 38 enlisted
- Armament: 1 × 24-pounder gun; 2 × 12-pounder guns

SMS Hyäne was a steam gunboat of the Jäger class built for the Prussian Navy in the late 1850s and early 1860s. The ship was ordered as part of a program to strengthen Prussia's coastal defense forces, then oriented against neighboring Denmark. She was armed with a battery of three guns. The ship saw very little activity during her career, beginning with a short period of active service for sea trials in late 1860. She was activated again during the Second Schleswig War against Denmark in 1864, and she saw brief action during the Battle of Jasmund on 17 March. She next recommissioned during the Franco-Prussian War in 1870, but she did not engage any French warships. In poor condition by that time, she was struck from the naval register in 1873 and sunk as a target ship.

== Design ==
Profile drawing showing the internal arrangement of the class

The Jäger class of steam gunboats came about as a result of a program to strengthen the Prussian Navy in the late 1850s in the aftermath of the First Schleswig War against Denmark. The wartime Reichsflotte (Imperial Fleet) had been dissolved, but tensions with Denmark remained high. In 1859, Prince Regent Wilhelm approved a construction program for some fifty-two gunboats to be built over the next fifteen years, which began with the fifteen vessels of the Jäger class. These ships were intended to defend the Prussian coast in the event of another war with Denmark.

Hyäne was 41.2 meters (135 ft 2 in) long overall, with a beam of 6.69 m (21 ft 11 in) and a draft of 2.2 m (7 ft 3 in). She displaced 237 metric tons (233 long tons) normally and 283 t (279 long tons) at full load. The ship's crew consisted of 2 officers and 38 enlisted men. She was powered by a pair of marine steam engines that drove one 3-bladed screw propeller, with steam provided by four coal-fired trunk boilers, which gave her a top speed of 9.1 knots (16.9 km/h; 10.5 mph) at 220 metric horsepower (220 ihp). As built, she was equipped with a three-masted schooner rig, which was later removed. The Jäger-class gunboats handled badly and tended to take on water in heavy seas. The ship was armed with a battery of one rifled 24-pounder muzzle-loading gun and two rifled 12-pounder muzzle-loading guns.

== Service history ==
Illustration of a Jäger-class gunboat

Hyäne was built at the Keier & Devrient shipyard in Danzig. Her keel was laid down in 1859 and she was launched in April 1860. The ship was commissioned in late 1860 for a brief period of sea trials, after which she was moved to Stralsund, where she was laid up at the nearby island of Dänholm. While out of service, her copper sheathing was removed from her hull so ventilation holes could be cut into the outer planking. Her entire propulsion system, including the masts and the funnel, were removed and a roof was erected over the hull to keep the elements out.

The ship remained out of service for the next few years. On 8 December 1863, the Prussian Navy ordered the fleet to mobilize, as tensions between Prussia and Denmark over the Schleswig–Holstein question rose sharply. Mobilization required Hyäne and the rest of the gunboats at Stralsund to be reconstructed. Following the outbreak of the Second Schleswig War in February 1864, Hyäne was commissioned on 11 February as the Prussian Navy mobilized for war. She was assigned to I Flotilla Division, along with several other gunboats. The Prussian gunboat divisions were assigned to guard the main Prussian ports on the Baltic coast, namely Stralsund, Stettin, and Swinemünde after the Royal Danish Navy imposed a blockade.

The ships of I Flotilla were deployed on 17 March to support Captain Eduard von Jachmann's corvettes as they attempted to break the Danish blockade, but the gunboats were only lightly engaged during the ensuing Battle of Jasmund. Jachmann had ordered them to take up a position closer to land to cover a potential withdrawal, and so they were too far to take part in the main action. Nevertheless, as the Danish steam frigate Tordenskjold arrived to reinforce the main squadron, Hyäne and the other gunboats fired on her from afar. Tordenskjold's commander ignored the gunboats and continued south to join the fight with Jachmann's corvettes, firing only a few broadsides at the gunboats in passing, with neither side scoring any hits. As the Danes continued south in pursuit of Jachmann's ships, the gunboats withdrew back to Stralsund, though they had to take Hay under tow after her engines broke down. In June, Hyäne was withdrawn from frontline service, and on 20 July, a ceasefire took effect, which led to negotiations to end the war. In early October, she was decommissioned, and on 20 October, the combatants signed the Treaty of Vienna, formally ending the war.

Hyäne was recommissioned briefly in 1869 to move her from Dänholm to Kiel, being in service only from 29 June to 9 July. The ship next saw active service in 1870 during the Franco-Prussian War. She was recommissioned on 24 July, and then sent through the Eider Canal to the North Sea, where she was assigned to the squadron defending the Prussian naval base at Wilhelmshaven. On 28 January 1871, she was transferred to the flotilla guarding the mouth of the Elbe river. Hyäne was decommissioned at Wilhelmshaven on 20 May. An inspection of the hull in 1872 revealed that it was badly rotted, so she was struck from the naval register on 17 July 1873. The ship's boilers were still in good condition, so they were installed aboard her sister Fuchs. Hyäne was then expended as a target ship.
