= SMS Wolf (1860) =

Prussian gunboat

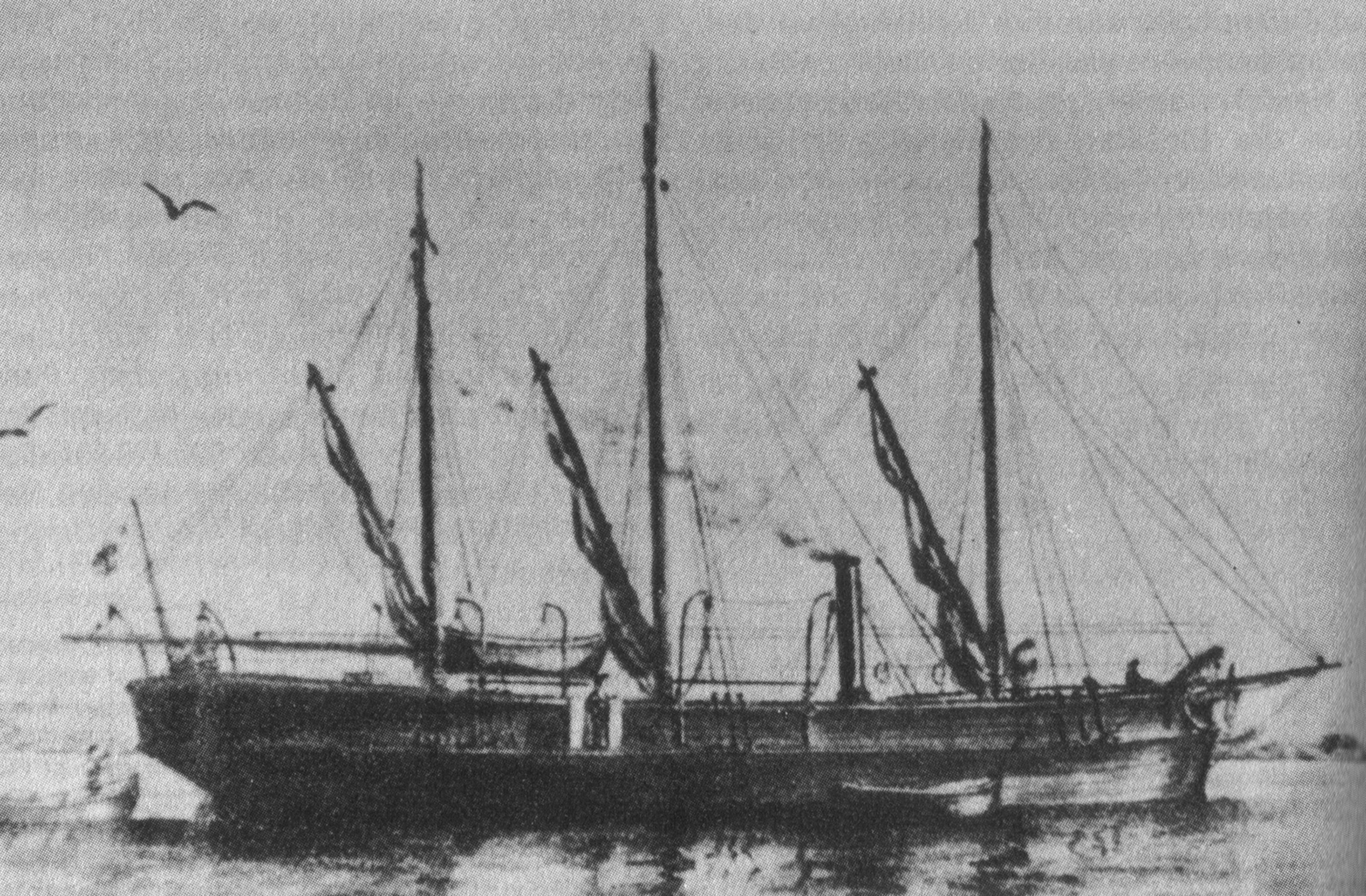
- Wolf's sister Fuchs

History
- Name: Wolf
- Namesake: Wolf
- Operator: Prussian Navy; Imperial German Navy
- Builder: Liegnitz, Grabow
- Laid down: 1859
- Launched: 29 April 1860
- Commissioned: 21 February 1864
- Decommissioned: 2 May 1873
- Stricken: 26 September 1875
- Fate: Sunk as a target ship, 4 August 1884; Raised and broken up

General characteristics
- Type: Jäger-class gunboat
- Displacement: Design: 237 t (233 long tons); Full load: 283 t (279 long tons)
- Length: 41.2 m (135 ft 2 in)
- Beam: 6.69 m (21 ft 11 in)
- Draft: 2.2 m (7 ft 3 in)
- Installed power: 4 × boilers; 220 PS (220 ihp)
- Propulsion: 2 × marine steam engines; 1 × screw propeller
- Speed: 9 knots (17 km/h; 10 mph)
- Complement: 2 officers; 38 enlisted
- Armament: 1 × 24-pounder gun; 2 × 12-pounder guns

SMS Wolf was a steam gunboat of the Jäger class built for the Prussian Navy in the late 1850s and early 1860s. The ship was ordered as part of a program to strengthen Prussia's coastal defense forces, then oriented against neighboring Denmark. She was the last of a class of fifteen ships. Wolf was armed with a battery of three guns. The ship saw very little activity during her career. She was activated during the three wars of German unification: the Second Schleswig War against Denmark in 1864. the Austro-Prussian War in 1866, and the Franco-Prussian War in 1870. She participated in a minor skirmish against Danish forces in the first conflict, and then took part in operations against the Kingdom of Hanover during the Austro-Prussian War. She saw no action during the war with France. Wolf remained in service until mid-1873; she was struck from the naval register in 1875, used as a storage hulk for nearly a decade, before being sunk as a target ship for torpedo tests in 1884. The wreck was then raised and scrapped.

== Design ==
Profile drawing showing the internal arrangement of the class

The Jäger class of steam gunboats came about as a result of a program to strengthen the Prussian Navy in the late 1850s in the aftermath of the First Schleswig War against Denmark. The wartime Reichsflotte (Imperial Fleet) had been dissolved, but tensions with Denmark remained high. In 1859, Prince Regent Wilhelm approved a construction program for some fifty-two gunboats to be built over the next fifteen years, which began with the fifteen vessels of the Jäger class. These ships were intended to defend the Prussian coast in the event of another war with Denmark.

Wolf was 41.2 meters (135 ft 2 in) long overall, with a beam of 6.69 m (21 ft 11 in) and a draft of 2.2 m (7 ft 3 in). She displaced 237 metric tons (233 long tons) normally and 283 t (279 long tons) at full load. The ship's crew consisted of 2 officers and 38 enlisted men. She was powered by a pair of marine steam engines that drove one 3-bladed screw propeller, with steam provided by four coal-fired trunk boilers, which gave her a top speed of 9.1 knots (16.9 km/h; 10.5 mph) at 220 metric horsepower (220 ihp). As built, she was equipped with a three-masted schooner rig, which was later removed. The Jäger-class gunboats handled badly and tended to take on water in heavy seas. The ship was armed with a battery of one rifled 24-pounder muzzle-loading gun and two rifled 12-pounder muzzle-loading guns.

== Service history ==
Illustration of a Jäger-class gunboat

Wolf was built at the Liegnitz shipyard in Grabow. Her keel was laid down in 1859 and she was launched on 29 April 1860; she was the last of a class of fifteen gunboats. The ship, which was named for the eponymous predator, was not commissioned upon completion, and she was instead towed to Stralsund, where she was laid up on the nearby island of Dänholm. While out of service, her copper sheathing was removed from her hull so ventilation holes could be cut into the outer planking. Her entire propulsion system, including the masts and the funnel, was removed and a roof was erected over the hull to keep the elements out.

The ship remained out of service for the next few years. On 8 December 1863, the Prussian Navy ordered the fleet to mobilize, as tensions between Prussia and Denmark over the Schleswig–Holstein question rose sharply. Mobilization meant that Wolf and the rest of the gunboats at Stralsund would have to be reconstructed. Wolf was first commissioned on 21 February 1864 after the start of the Second Schleswig War against Denmark. She was assigned to III Flotilla Division. The Prussian gunboat divisions were assigned to guard the main Prussian ports on the Baltic coast, namely Stralsund, Stettin, and Swinemünde after the Royal Danish Navy imposed a blockade of the ports. III and V Divisions were based in Stralsund to defend the Kubitzer Bodden and the Bay of Greifswald. In the aftermath of the Battle of Jasmund in mid-March, Prince Adalbert, the Prussian naval commander, ordered all five gunboat divisions to concentrate at Stralsund on 29 March to support the Prussian Army's invasion of the island of Als, but bad weather prevented the vessels from taking part in the operation. Following a ceasefire in May, the Prussian fleet held a naval review in Swinemünde for King Wilhelm I on 6 June; the aviso Loreley led the gunboat divisions during the review.

Also in May, the ship was temporarily commanded by Fahnrich zur See (Ensign) Friedrich von Hollmann. The ceasefire did not hold, and Wolf participated in a battle with Danish naval forces off Dornbusch on 3 July. Another ceasefire took effect on 20 July, which led to negotiations to end the war. On 23 September, Wolf was decommissioned and placed back in reserve at Dänholm. The combatants signed the Treaty of Vienna on 20 October, formally ending the war.

The ship returned to service on 3 April 1866 to carry out surveys of Prussia's North Sea coast, initially under the command of Unterleutnant zur See (ULzS–Sub-lieutenant at Sea) Conrad Dietert, but later in May, he was replaced by Leutnant zur See Otto Zembsch. She departed Kiel in company with Loreley on 22 April, bound for the Jade Bight. The outbreak of the Austro-Prussian War in June interrupted the survey work, and Wolf was assigned to a flotilla led by the ironclad Arminius. The unit also included several other vessels, including Loreley and the gunboats Tiger and Cyclop; the ships had assembled at Hamburg in early June, shortly before the start of the war on 14 June. The following day, the Kingdom of Hannover entered the war against Prussia, and because the Austrian fleet was confined to the Adriatic Sea, the Prussian navy concentrated its effort against the Hannoverians. During these operations, Wolf and Tiger bombarded Hannoverian coastal artillery at the mouth of the Elbe. On 24 June, Wolf towed four barges loaded with captured Hannoverian rifles and ammunition to Altona. After operations against Hannover ended, the ship returned to survey work, which lasted until her decommissioning on 10 November in Geestemünde.

Wolf next recommissioned on 24 April 1867 for further survey work, this time in company with Loreley and the gunboat Basilisk. She was decommissioned for the winter on 26 October, and she returned to service the following year on 21 April. But in 1868, budget conflicts between the navy and the Landtag caused a shortage of funds that necessitated the decommissioning of Wolf already on 6 May. Shortages of crewmen kept the ship out of service at Geestemünde in 1869. Wolf finally returned to service on 1 June 1870 to replace the ironclad Prinz Adalbert as the station ship in Altona, but the start of the Franco-Prussian War the following month saw her transferred to guard the entrance to Jade Bay. In September, ULzS Franz Strauch took command of the ship. In May 1871, with the war over, Wolf returned to survey duty in the North Sea, which lasted until her decommissioning on 19 June. The ship was reactivated in August 1872 to serve as a tender for the artillery training ship Renown. On 11 December, she sailed to Kiel, but icy conditions prevented her from reaching the port, and she had to turn back to Wilhelmshaven, where she was decommissioned on 31 December. At some point in 1872, the ship was rearmed with a 15 cm (5.9 in) RK L/22 gun, a modern breechloading weapon. Wolf was briefly recommissioned in April 1873 to sail through the Eider Canal to Kiel, where she was decommissioned again on 2 May. She was struck from the naval register on 26 September 1875, converted into a naval mine storage hulk, and was renamed Minenprahm Nr. 2 (Mine Barge No. 2). The vessel was eventually sunk as a target ship by the torpedo testing ship Blücher during tests outside Kiel on 4 August 1884. Her wreck was later raised and broken up.
