= SMS Habicht (1860) =

Prussian gunboat

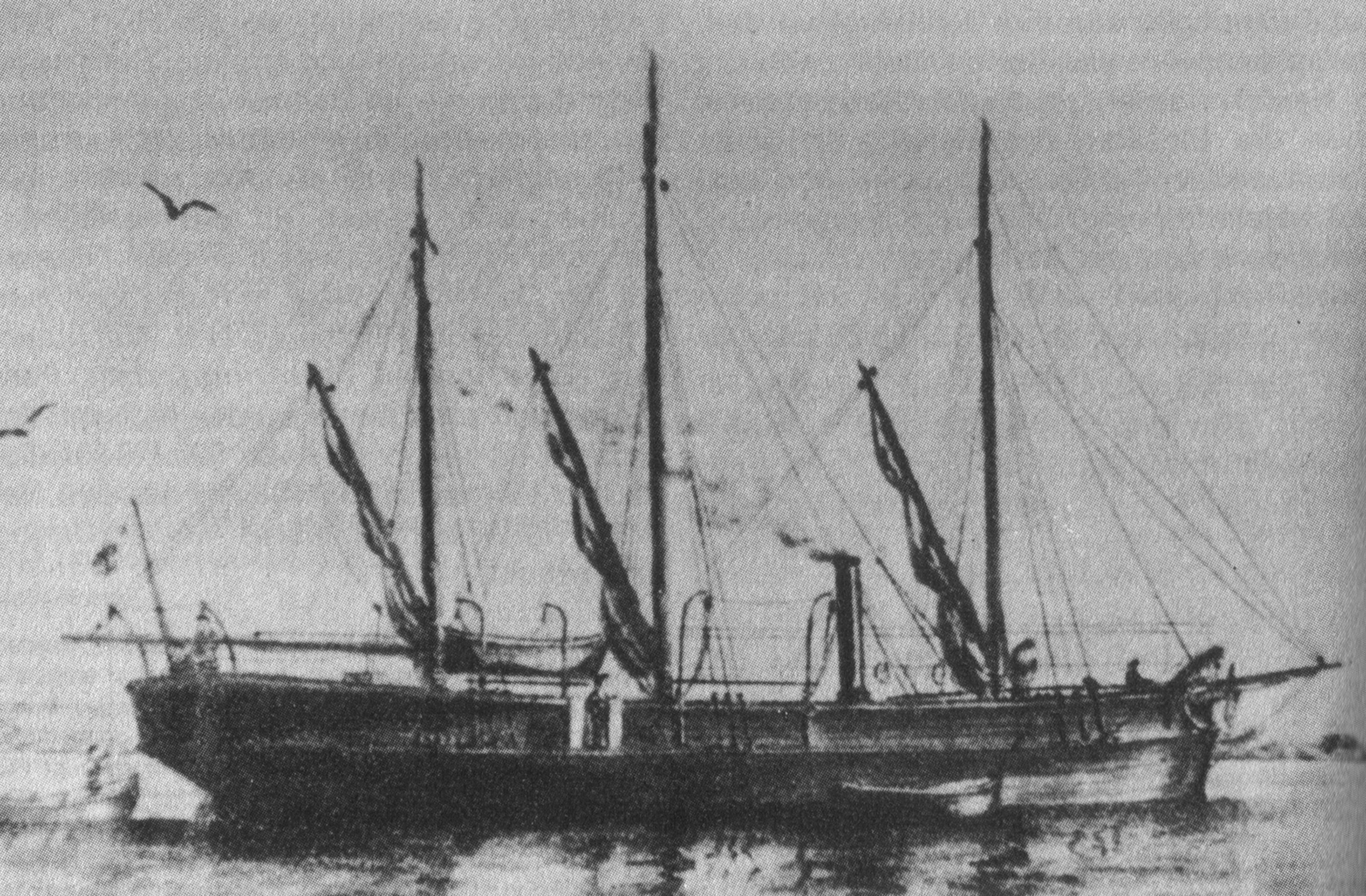
- Habicht's sister Fuchs

History
- Name: Habicht
- Operator: Prussian Navy; Imperial German Navy
- Builder: Keier & Devrient, Danzig
- Laid down: 1859
- Launched: 1860
- Commissioned: 1860
- Decommissioned: 31 August 1877
- Stricken: 29 November 1877

General characteristics
- Type: Jäger-class gunboat
- Displacement: Design: 237 t (233 long tons); Full load: 283 t (279 long tons)
- Length: 41.2 m (135 ft 2 in)
- Beam: 6.69 m (21 ft 11 in)
- Draft: 2.2 m (7 ft 3 in)
- Installed power: 4 × boilers; 220 PS (220 ihp)
- Propulsion: 2 × marine steam engines; 1 × screw propeller
- Speed: 9 knots (17 km/h; 10 mph)
- Complement: 2 officers; 38 enlisted
- Armament: 1 × 24-pounder gun; 2 × 12-pounder guns

SMS Habicht was a steam gunboat of the Jäger class built for the Prussian Navy in the late 1850s and early 1860s. The ship was ordered as part of a program to strengthen Prussia's coastal defense forces, then oriented against neighboring Denmark. She was armed with a battery of three guns. The ship saw very little activity during her career. She was activated during the Second Schleswig War against Denmark in 1864 and briefly engaged Danish ships in July. She was also commissioned for the Franco-Prussian War in 1870, being used to defend the Prussian coast. She saw no action against French forces in the conflict, however. Habicht largely remained out of service through the 1870s, until she was struck from the naval register in 1877. She was used as a storage hulk for a time in Wilhelmshaven, but details of her eventual disposal are unknown.

== Design ==
Profile drawing showing the internal arrangement of the class

The Jäger class of steam gunboats came about as a result of a program to strengthen the Prussian Navy in the late 1850s in the aftermath of the First Schleswig War against Denmark. The wartime Reichsflotte (Imperial Fleet) had been dissolved, but tensions with Denmark remained high. In 1859, Prince Regent Wilhelm approved a construction program for some fifty-two gunboats to be built over the next fifteen years, which began with the fifteen vessels of the Jäger class. These ships were intended to defend the Prussian coast in the event of another war with Denmark.

Habicht was 41.2 meters (135 ft 2 in) long overall, with a beam of 6.69 m (21 ft 11 in) and a draft of 2.2 m (7 ft 3 in). She displaced 237 metric tons (233 long tons) normally and 283 t (279 long tons) at full load. The ship's crew consisted of 2 officers and 38 enlisted men. She was powered by a pair of marine steam engines that drove one 3-bladed screw propeller, with steam provided by four coal-fired trunk boilers, which gave her a top speed of 9.1 knots (16.9 km/h; 10.5 mph) at 220 metric horsepower (220 ihp). As built, she was equipped with a three-masted schooner rig, which was later removed. The Jäger-class gunboats handled badly and tended to take on water in heavy seas. The ship was armed with a battery of one rifled 24-pounder muzzle-loading gun and two rifled 12-pounder muzzle-loading guns.

== Service history ==
Illustration of a Jäger-class gunboat

Habicht was laid down at the Keier & Devrient shipyard in Danzig 1859 and she was launched in 1860. After completion in late 1860, Habicht was moved to Stralsund and was then laid up on the nearby island of Dänholm. While out of service, her copper sheathing was removed from her hull so ventilation holes could be cut into the outer planking. Her entire propulsion system, including the masts and the funnel, was removed and a roof was erected over the hull to keep the elements out.

The ship remained out of service for the next few years. On 8 December 1863, the Prussian Navy ordered the fleet to mobilize, as tensions between Prussia and Denmark over the Schleswig–Holstein question rose sharply. Mobilization meant that Habicht and the rest of the gunboats at Stralsund would have to be reconstructed. After the start of the Second Schleswig War in February 1864, Habicht was recommissioned under the command of Leutnant zur See (LzS—Lieutenant at Sea) Paul von Reibnitz on 1 March to join III Flotilla Division. The Prussian gunboat divisions were assigned to guard the main Prussian ports on the Baltic coast, namely Stralsund, Stettin, and Swinemünde after the Royal Danish Navy imposed a blockade of the ports. III and V Divisions were based in Stralsund to defend the Kubitzer Bodden and the Bay of Greifswald.

In the aftermath of the Battle of Jasmund in mid-March, Prince Adalbert, the Prussian naval commander, ordered all five gunboat divisions to concentrate at Stralsund on 29 March to support the Prussian Army's invasion of the island of Als, but bad weather prevented the vessels from taking part in the operation. In April, LzS Carl von Eisendecher replaced Reibnitz as the ship's captain. Following a ceasefire in May, the Prussian fleet held a naval review in Swinemünde for King Wilhelm I on 6 June; the aviso Loreley led the gunboat divisions during the review. The ceasefire did not hold, and Habicht participated in a battle with Danish naval forces off Hiddensee on 3 July. Another ceasefire took effect on 20 July, which led to negotiations to end the war. In late September, Habicht was decommissioned and placed back in reserve at Dänholm. On 20 October, the combatants signed the Treaty of Vienna, formally ending the war.

Habicht was recommissioned again on 3 April 1867 to serve as a tender for the Marinestation der Ostsee (Baltic Sea Naval Station), based in Kiel. While serving in this role, Habicht also carried soldiers from the Seebataillon (Naval Battalion) around the area, and she took part in training exercises with naval gun crews. She also operated gunnery training ship Thetis. On 4 September, Habicht embarked visitors to the fourteenth Evangelical Church Conference for a local tour. The ship was decommissioned for the winter on 30 November, and was recommissioned on 1 April 1868. She resumed tender duties in Kiel, but funding shortages forced the navy to decommission the ship from 8 May to 10 July. After returning to service, she again operated as a tender for Thetis. Prince Adalbert came aboard Habicht for an inspection of the coasts of Holstein, Mecklenburg, and Western Pomerania from 20 to 22 September. The ship was placed back in reserve on 28 November.

Engine problems prevented Habicht from being recommissioned in 1869. After the start of the Franco-Prussian War in 1870, the Prussian Navy mobilized its ships on 20 July, including Habicht. She was sent through the Eider Canal to join the ships guarding the mouth of the Elbe river, arriving there on 31 July. She saw no action during this period, and after the war in 1871, she was sent into the Unterelbe to supervise the withdrawal of French prisoners of war back to France. On 21 April, the ship was decommissioned at Wilhelmshaven. The following year, Habicht underwent a refit that included replacing her main gun with a more modern, iron 15 cm (5.9 in) RK L/22 gun. Her sailing rig was removed and a simple pole mast was fitted for signaling purposes. The ship's last period in service began on 19 March 1877, which saw the ship serve as a tender for the artillery training ship Renown. On 31 August, she was decommissioned again, and on 29 November, she was struck from the naval register. She was then converted into a storage hulk based in Wilhelmshaven. Her ultimate fate is unknown.
