= SMS Crocodill (1860) =

Prussian gunboat

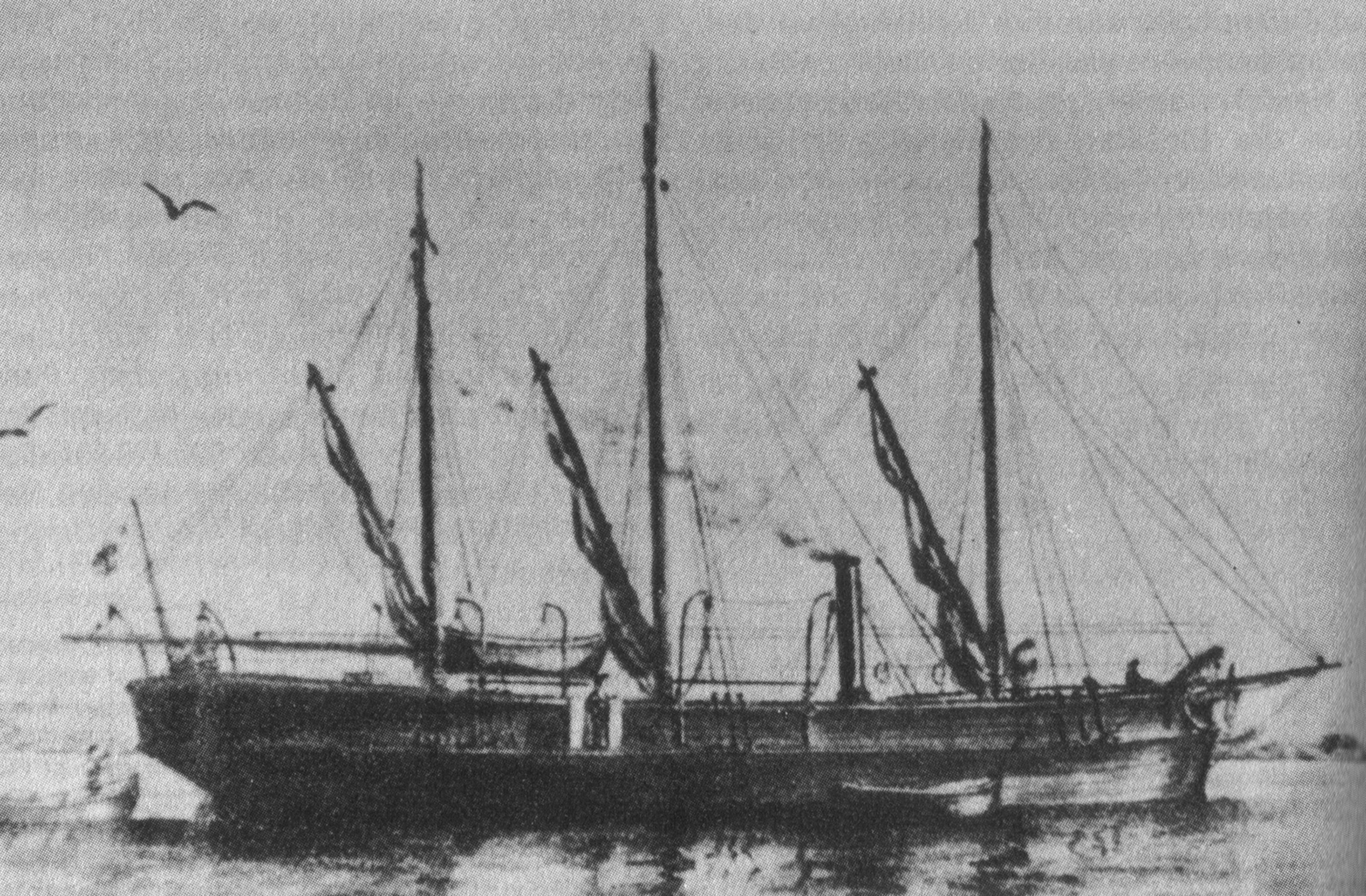
- Crocodill's sister Fuchs

History
- Name: Crocodill
- Namesake: Crocodile
- Operator: Prussian Navy
- Builder: Mitzlaff, Elbing
- Laid down: 1859
- Launched: January 1860
- Stricken: 14 March 1867
- Fate: Broken up

General characteristics
- Type: Jäger-class gunboat
- Displacement: Design: 237 t (233 long tons); Full load: 283 t (279 long tons)
- Length: 41.2 m (135 ft 2 in)
- Beam: 6.69 m (21 ft 11 in)
- Draft: 2.2 m (7 ft 3 in)
- Installed power: 4 × boilers; 220 PS (220 ihp)
- Propulsion: 2 × marine steam engines; 1 × screw propeller
- Speed: 9 knots (17 km/h; 10 mph)
- Complement: 2 officers; 38 enlisted
- Armament: 1 × 24-pounder gun; 2 × 12-pounder guns

SMS Crocodill was a steam gunboat of the Jäger class built for the Prussian Navy in the late 1850s and early 1860s. The ship was ordered as part of a program to strengthen Prussia's coastal defense forces, then oriented against neighboring Denmark. She was armed with a battery of three guns. The ship saw very little activity during her career; she was commissioned only once, during the Second Schleswig War against Denmark in 1864. The ship was already in very poor condition by that time as a result of dry rot of her wooden hull. She was broken up in 1867, the first member of her class to be discarded.

== Design ==
Profile drawing showing the internal arrangement of the class

The Jäger class of steam gunboats came about as a result of a program to strengthen the Prussian Navy in the late 1850s in the aftermath of the First Schleswig War against Denmark. The wartime Reichsflotte (Imperial Fleet) had been dissolved, but tensions with Denmark remained high. In 1859, Prince Regent Wilhelm approved a construction program for some fifty-two gunboats to be built over the next fifteen years, which began with the fifteen vessels of the Jäger class. These ships were intended to defend the Prussian coast in the event of another war with Denmark.

Crocodill was 41.2 meters (135 ft 2 in) long overall, with a beam of 6.69 m (21 ft 11 in) and a draft of 2.2 m (7 ft 3 in). She displaced 237 metric tons (233 long tons) normally and 283 t (279 long tons) at full load. The ship's crew consisted of 2 officers and 38 enlisted men. She was powered by a pair of marine steam engines that drove one 3-bladed screw propeller, with steam provided by four coal-fired trunk boilers, which gave her a top speed of 9.1 knots (16.9 km/h; 10.5 mph) at 220 metric horsepower (220 ihp). As built, she was equipped with a three-masted schooner rig, which was later removed. The Jäger-class gunboats handled badly and tended to take on water in heavy seas. The ship was armed with a battery of one rifled 24-pounder muzzle-loading gun and two rifled 12-pounder muzzle-loading guns.

== Service history ==
Illustration of a Jäger-class gunboat

Crocodill was laid down at the Mitzlaff shipyard in Elbing in 1859, and she was launched in late January 1860. Named after the crocodile, the ship was completed later that year, and after conducting her initial sea trials in the fall of 1860, she was moved to Stralsund before being laid up on the island of Dänholm. While out of service, her copper sheathing was removed from her hull so ventilation holes could be cut into the outer planking. Her entire propulsion system, including the masts and the funnel, was removed and a roof was erected over the hull to keep the elements out.

The ship remained out of service for the next few years. On 8 December 1863, the Prussian Navy ordered the fleet to mobilize, as tensions between Prussia and Denmark over the Schleswig–Holstein question rose sharply. Mobilization meant that Crocodill and the rest of the gunboats at Stralsund would have to be reconstructed. When the shipyard began to reactivate the ship, the workers found that the preservation efforts had not been successful, and by the start of the Second Schleswig War in February 1864, Crocodill was found to be badly dry rotted. Temporary repairs to the hull were made to allow her to be mobilized for use as a floating battery to defend Stralsund in the event of a Danish amphibious assault, which did not materialize. After a few months of service, she was again laid up. Fighting ended with an armistice on 20 July, and on 20 October, the combatants signed the Treaty of Vienna, formally ending the war.

Crocodill remained in the fleet's inventory for just a short time after the end of the conflict, owing to her poor condition. She was struck from the naval register on 14 March 1867 and thereafter broken up. She was the first ship of her class to be discarded.
