= SMS Wespe (1860) =

Prussian gunboat

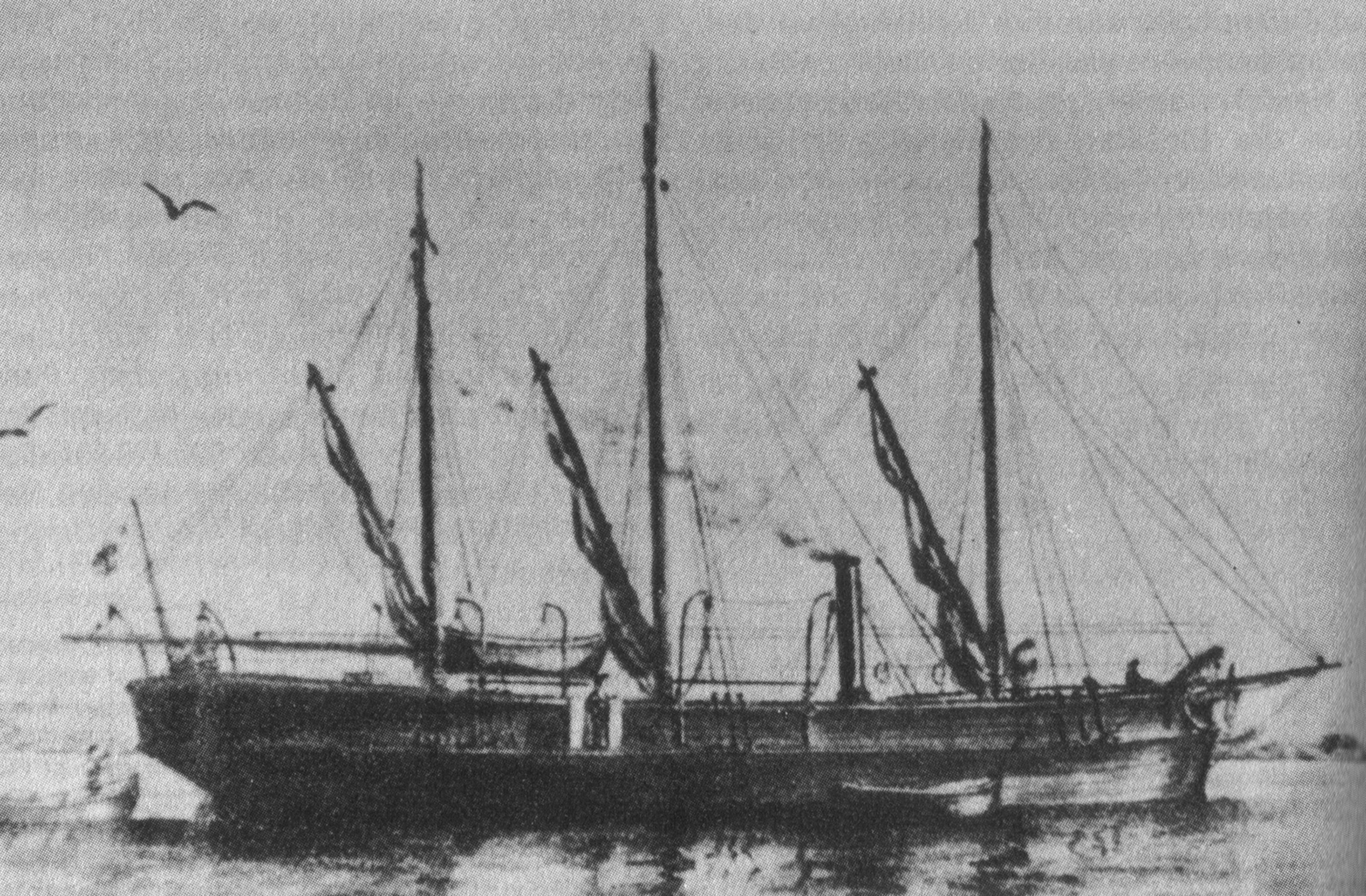
- Wespe's sister Fuchs

History
- Name: Wespe
- Namesake: Wasp
- Operator: Prussian Navy; Imperial German Navy
- Builder: Zieske, Stettin
- Laid down: 1859
- Launched: 14 February 1860
- Commissioned: 11 February 1864
- Decommissioned: 13 May 1871
- Stricken: 19 March 1872

General characteristics
- Type: Jäger-class gunboat
- Displacement: Design: 237 t (233 long tons); Full load: 283 t (279 long tons)
- Length: 41.2 m (135 ft 2 in)
- Beam: 6.69 m (21 ft 11 in)
- Draft: 2.2 m (7 ft 3 in)
- Installed power: 4 × boilers; 220 PS (220 ihp)
- Propulsion: 2 × marine steam engines; 1 × screw propeller
- Speed: 9 knots (17 km/h; 10 mph)
- Complement: 2 officers; 38 enlisted
- Armament: 1 × 24-pounder gun; 2 × 12-pounder guns

SMS Wespe was a steam gunboat of the Jäger class built for the Prussian Navy in the late 1850s and early 1860s. The ship was ordered as part of a program to strengthen Prussia's coastal defense forces, then oriented against neighboring Denmark. She was armed with a battery of three guns. The ship saw very little activity during her career. She was activated during the Second Schleswig War against Denmark in 1864, and she saw brief action during the Battle of Jasmund on 17 March. She next recommissioned during the Franco-Prussian War in 1870, but did not engage any French warships. In poor condition by that time, she was struck from the naval register in 1872 and converted into a storage hulk. Her ultimate fate is unknown.

== Design ==
Profile drawing showing the internal arrangement of the class

The Jäger class of steam gunboats came about as a result of a program to strengthen the Prussian Navy in the late 1850s in the aftermath of the First Schleswig War against Denmark. The wartime Reichsflotte (Imperial Fleet) had been dissolved, but tensions with Denmark remained high. In 1859, Prince Regent Wilhelm approved a construction program for some fifty-two gunboats to be built over the next fifteen years, which began with the fifteen vessels of the Jäger class. These ships were intended to defend the Prussian coast in the event of another war with Denmark.

Wespe was 41.2 meters (135 ft 2 in) long overall, with a beam of 6.69 m (21 ft 11 in) and a draft of 2.2 m (7 ft 3 in). She displaced 237 metric tons (233 long tons) normally and 283 t (279 long tons) at full load. The ship's crew consisted of 2 officers and 38 enlisted men. She was powered by a pair of marine steam engines that drove one 3-bladed screw propeller, with steam provided by four coal-fired trunk boilers, which gave her a top speed of 9.1 knots (16.9 km/h; 10.5 mph) at 220 metric horsepower (220 ihp). As built, she was equipped with a three-masted schooner rig, which was later removed. The Jäger-class gunboats handled badly and tended to take on water in heavy seas. The ship was armed with a battery of one rifled 24-pounder muzzle-loading gun and two rifled 12-pounder muzzle-loading guns.

== Service history ==
Illustration of a Jäger-class gunboat

Wespe, named for the German word for wasp, was built at the Zieske shipyard in Stettin. Her keel was laid down in 1859 and she was launched on 14 February 1860. The ship was not commissioned upon completion, and while out of service, her copper sheathing was removed from her hull so ventilation holes could be cut into the outer planking. Her entire propulsion system, including the masts and the funnel, was removed and a roof was erected over the hull to keep the elements out. The preservation work was not successful, and soon after work was finished, workers discovered that her hull had already begun to mold badly, which militated against active service.

The ship remained out of service for the next few years. On 8 December 1863, the Prussian Navy ordered the fleet to mobilize, as tensions between Prussia and Denmark over the Schleswig–Holstein question rose sharply. Mobilization meant that Wespe and the rest of the gunboats at Stralsund would have to be reconstructed. After the start of the Second Schleswig War in February 1864, Wespe was commissioned under the command of Fahnrich zur See (Ensign) Karl Eduard Heusner on 11 February. She was assigned to I Flotilla Division, along with several other gunboats. The Prussian gunboat divisions were assigned to guard the main Prussian ports on the Baltic coast, namely Stralsund, Stettin, and Swinemünde after the Royal Danish Navy imposed a blockade of the ports.

The flotilla was deployed on 17 March to support Captain Eduard von Jachmann's corvettes as they attempted to break the Danish blockade in the Baltic Sea, but the gunboats were only lightly engaged during the ensuing Battle of Jasmund. Jachmann had ordered them to take up a position closer to land to cover a potential withdrawal, and so they were too far to take part in the main action. Nevertheless, as the Danish steam frigate Tordenskjold arrived to reinforce the main squadron, Wespe and the other gunboats fired on her from afar. Tordenskjold's commander ignored the gunboats and continued south to join the fight with Jachmann's corvettes, firing only a few broadsides at the gunboats in passing, with neither side scoring any hits. As the Danes continued south in pursuit of Jachmann's ships, the gunboats withdrew back to Stralsund, though one of the Prussian gunboats, Hay, broke down and had to be taken under tow. Wespe saw no further action during the war, and fighting ended in an armistice on 20 July. On 20 October, the combatants signed the Treaty of Vienna, formally ending the war. Wespe was decommissioned again that month.

Wespe returned to active service on 24 July 1870 during the mobilization that followed the outbreak of the Franco-Prussian War. She soon sailed from Kiel, passed through the Eider Canal to the North Sea, and proceeded to the mouth of the Ems river. She was joined there by her sister ship Natter, and the ships were based at Emden during this period. Wespe's captain, Leutnant zur See (Lieutenant at Sea) Johannes Meller, was the more senior officer of the two captains, and so he exercised command of the small flotilla. The two ships were planned to operate as part of the coastal defense system in the area, which also included coastal artillery batteries on the island of Borkum, and two infantry regiments. Wespe saw no combat during the war, mainly because the French squadron in the North Sea focused its attention on the area near Helgoland. On 10 September, Wespe and Natter went to sea to observe the withdrawal of French warships from Prussia's coast. The gunboats nevertheless patrolled in the Ems area for the next several months.

An armistice ended the fighting on 28 January 1871, and in February Jachmann, now the Prussian fleet commander, ordered Natter and Wespe to join the main fleet at Wilhelmshaven. Wespe thereafter returned to the Baltic, and on 13 May she was decommissioned again at Kiel. During an inspection of the hull in 1872, the ship was found to be beyond economical repair, and she was accordingly struck from the naval register on 19 March. The ship was slated to be converted into a naval mine storage hulk, but before work began, the ship was briefly recommissioned (despite no longer officially being a naval vessel) on 22 July for brief service during gunnery practice. At the time, only her sister Hay was available to join Wespe for the exercises in the Kieler Förde that lasted until 5 August. Wespe was then converted, renamed Minenprahm Nr. 1 (Mine Barge No. 1), and towed to Wilhelmshaven. The details of her eventual disposal are unknown.
