= SMS Schwalbe (1860) =

Prussian gunboat

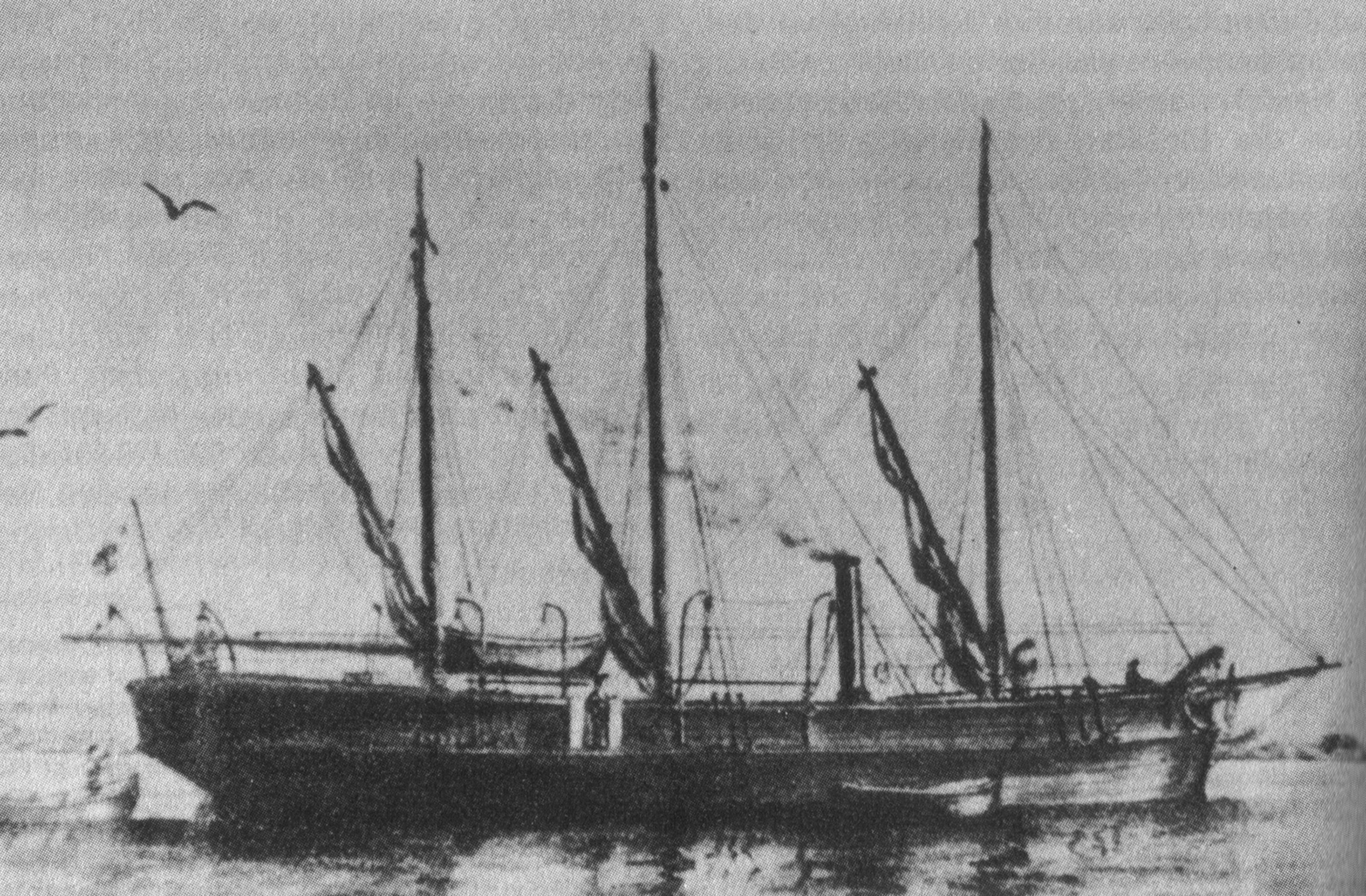
- Schwalbe's sister Fuchs

History
- Name: Schwalbe
- Namesake: Swallow
- Operator: Prussian Navy; Imperial German Navy
- Builder: A. G. Nüscke, Grabow
- Laid down: 1859
- Launched: 14 February 1860
- Commissioned: 1 March 1864
- Decommissioned: 5 October 1870
- Stricken: 19 March 1872
- Fate: Broken up

General characteristics
- Type: Jäger-class gunboat
- Displacement: Design: 237 t (233 long tons); Full load: 283 t (279 long tons)
- Length: 41.2 m (135 ft 2 in)
- Beam: 6.69 m (21 ft 11 in)
- Draft: 2.2 m (7 ft 3 in)
- Installed power: 4 × boilers; 220 PS (220 ihp)
- Propulsion: 2 × marine steam engines; 1 × screw propeller
- Speed: 9 knots (17 km/h; 10 mph)
- Complement: 2 officers; 38 enlisted
- Armament: 1 × 24-pounder gun; 2 × 12-pounder guns

SMS Schwalbe was a steam gunboat of the Jäger class built for the Prussian Navy in the late 1850s and early 1860s. The ship was ordered as part of a program to strengthen Prussia's coastal defense forces, then oriented against neighboring Denmark. She was armed with a battery of three guns. The ship saw very little activity during her career. She was activated during the Second Schleswig War against Denmark in 1864 and the Franco-Prussian War in 1870, being used to defend the Prussian coast. She saw no action against enemy forces in either conflict, however. The ship was found to be in poor condition by the end of the war, and she was discarded in 1872. She was then used as a barge for some time, but her ultimate fate is unknown.

== Design ==
Profile drawing showing the internal arrangement of the class

The Jäger class of steam gunboats came about as a result of a program to strengthen the Prussian Navy in the late 1850s in the aftermath of the First Schleswig War against Denmark. The wartime Reichsflotte (Imperial Fleet) had been dissolved, but tensions with Denmark remained high. In 1859, Prince Regent Wilhelm approved a construction program for some fifty-two gunboats to be built over the next fifteen years, which began with the fifteen vessels of the Jäger class. These ships were intended to defend the Prussian coast in the event of another war with Denmark.

Schwalbe was 41.2 meters (135 ft 2 in) long overall, with a beam of 6.69 m (21 ft 11 in) and a draft of 2.2 m (7 ft 3 in). She displaced 237 metric tons (233 long tons) normally and 283 t (279 long tons) at full load. The ship's crew consisted of 2 officers and 38 enlisted men. She was powered by a pair of marine steam engines that drove one 3-bladed screw propeller, with steam provided by four coal-fired trunk boilers, which gave her a top speed of 9.1 knots (16.9 km/h; 10.5 mph) at 220 metric horsepower (220 ihp). As built, she was equipped with a three-masted schooner rig. The Jäger-class gunboats handled badly and tended to take on water in heavy seas. The ship was armed with a battery of one rifled 24-pounder muzzle-loading gun and two rifled 12-pounder muzzle-loading guns.

== Service history ==
Illustration of a Jäger-class gunboat

Schwalbe was built at the A. G. Nüscke shipyard in Grabow. Her keel was laid down in 1859 and she was launched on 14 February 1860. The ship was named for the swallow. After completion, she was laid up on the island of Dänholm near Stralsund. While out of service, her copper sheathing was removed from her hull so ventilation holes could be cut into the outer planking. Her entire propulsion system, including the masts and the funnel, was removed and a roof was erected to protect her hull.

The ship remained out of service for the next few years. On 8 December 1863, the Prussian Navy ordered the fleet to mobilize, as tensions between Prussia and Denmark over the Schleswig–Holstein question rose sharply. Mobilization meant that Schwalbe and the rest of the gunboats at Stralsund would have to be reconstructed. She remained out of service until the start of the Second Schleswig War in February 1864. She was commissioned on 1 March, under the command of Fahnrich zur See Karl August Deinhard, and assigned to II Flotilla Division. The Prussian gunboat divisions were assigned to guard the main Prussian ports on the Baltic coast, namely Stralsund, Stettin, and Swinemünde after the Royal Danish Navy imposed a blockade of the ports. She saw no action during the short war, and she was placed back in reserve in October. On 20 October, the combatants signed the Treaty of Vienna, formally ending the conflict.

Schwalbe was recommissioned again on 27 July 1870 following the start of the Franco-Prussian War, and three days later she was moved to the North Sea via the Eider Canal. She again saw no combat, only carrying out defensive patrols to guard the entrance to Jade Bight, and was decommissioned at Geestemünde on 5 October. During an inspection at the Kaiserliche Werft (Imperial Shipyard) in Kiel in 1872, Schwalbe was found to be in poor condition, and she was struck from the naval register on 19 March. She was used for several years as a barge in Kiel under the name Minenprahm Nr. 1 (Mine Barge No. 1), but the date of her breaking up are not recorded.
