= SMS Jäger =

Prussian gunboat

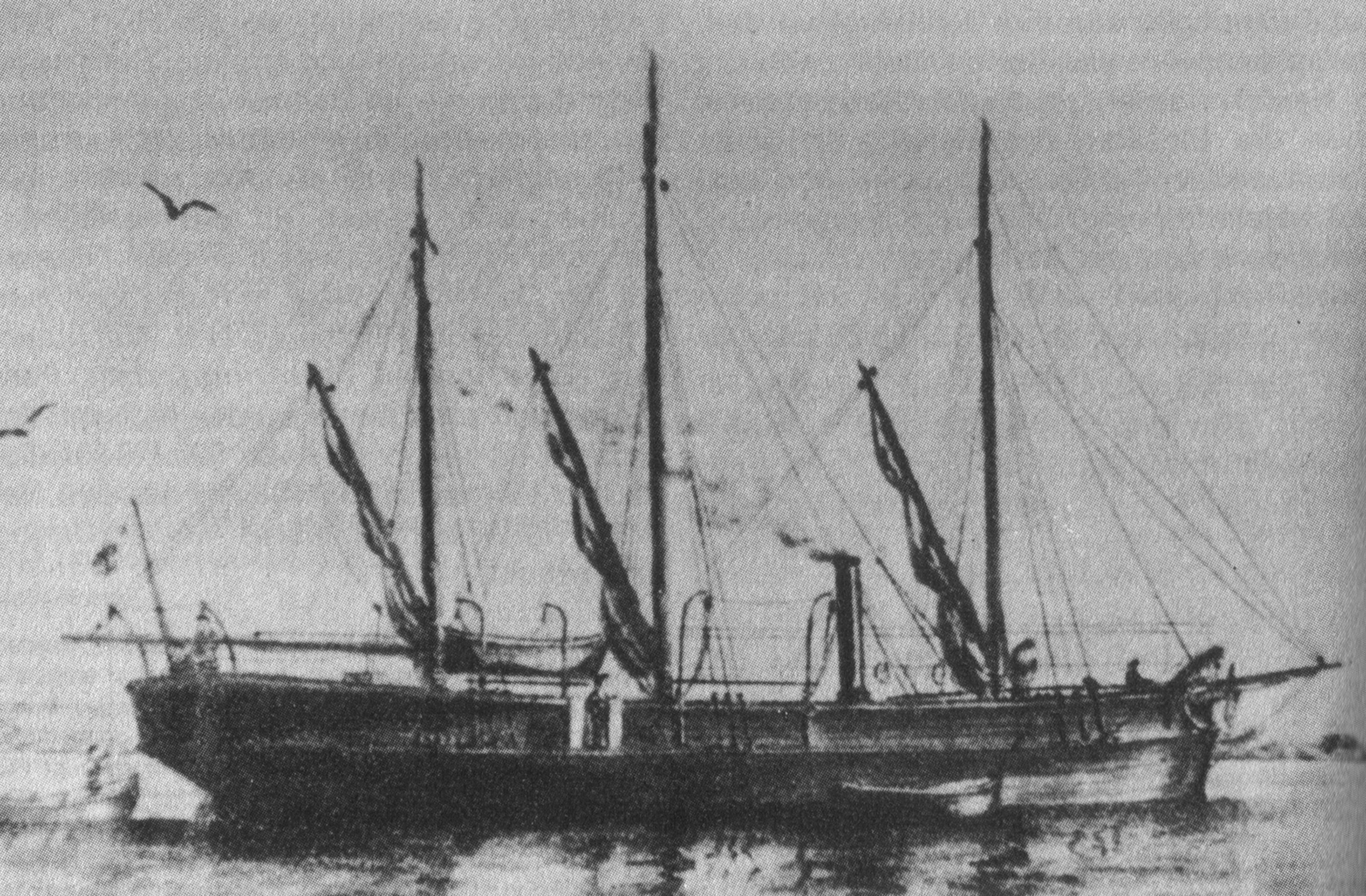
- Jäger's sister Fuchs

History
- Name: Jäger
- Operator: Prussian Navy; Imperial German Navy
- Builder: Mitzlaff, Elbing
- Laid down: 1859
- Launched: January 1860
- Commissioned: 25 June 1861
- Decommissioned: 8 April 1871
- Stricken: 19 March 1872
- Fate: Broken up

General characteristics
- Type: Jäger-class gunboat
- Displacement: Design: 237 t (233 long tons); Full load: 283 t (279 long tons)
- Length: 41.2 m (135 ft 2 in)
- Beam: 6.69 m (21 ft 11 in)
- Draft: 2.2 m (7 ft 3 in)
- Installed power: 4 × boilers; 220 PS (220 ihp)
- Propulsion: 2 × marine steam engines; 1 × screw propeller
- Speed: 9 knots (17 km/h; 10 mph)
- Complement: 2 officers; 38 enlisted
- Armament: 1 × 24-pounder gun; 2 × 12-pounder guns

SMS Jäger was the lead ship of the Jäger class of steam gunboats built for the Prussian Navy in the late 1850s and early 1860s. The ship was ordered as part of a program to strengthen Prussia's coastal defense forces, then oriented against neighboring Denmark. She was armed with a battery of three guns. The ship saw limited time in service. She was activated during the Second Schleswig War in 1864 and saw brief action against Danish naval forces in July. Jäger next recommissioned at the start of the Franco-Prussian War in 1870, and was stationed in the mouth of the Elbe river, but she saw no combat with French forces. In poor condition by that time, Jäger was struck from the naval register in 1872. She was initially used as a target ship and later a coal storage hulk. The ship was eventually broken up in the early 1880s.

== Design ==
Profile drawing showing the internal arrangement of the class

The Jäger class of steam gunboats came about as a result of a program to strengthen the Prussian Navy in the late 1850s in the aftermath of the First Schleswig War against Denmark. The wartime Reichsflotte (Imperial Fleet) had been dissolved, but tensions with Denmark remained high. In 1859, Prince Regent Wilhelm approved a construction program for some fifty-two gunboats to be built over the next fifteen years, which began with the fifteen vessels of the Jäger class. These ships were intended to defend the Prussian coast in the event of another war with Denmark.

Jäger was 41.2 meters (135 ft 2 in) long overall, with a beam of 6.69 m (21 ft 11 in) and a draft of 2.2 m (7 ft 3 in). She displaced 237 metric tons (233 long tons) normally and 283 t (279 long tons) at full load. The ship's crew consisted of 2 officers and 38 enlisted men. She was powered by a pair of marine steam engines that drove one 3-bladed screw propeller, with steam provided by four coal-fired trunk boilers, which gave her a top speed of 9.1 knots (16.9 km/h; 10.5 mph) at 220 metric horsepower (220 ihp). As built, she was equipped with a three-masted schooner rig, which was later removed. The Jäger-class gunboats handled badly and tended to take on water in heavy seas. The ship was armed with a battery of one rifled 24-pounder muzzle-loading gun and two rifled 12-pounder muzzle-loading guns.

== Service history ==
Illustration of a Jäger-class gunboat

Jäger was built at the Mitzlaff shipyard in Elbing. Her keel was laid down in 1859 and she was launched in January 1860. There was no launching ceremony to avoid any increase in costs for construction of the ship. She was commissioned on 25 June 1861 for sea trials, after which she joined a gunboat flotilla. The unit was led by the gunboat Camäleon, and also included Comet, Salamander, and Scorpion. The ships departed for a training cruise that included a visit to Skagen in Denmark and the free imperial cities of Hamburg and Bremen. After the stop in Skagen, the corvette Amazone and the schooner Hela joined the flotilla of gunboats. While on their way back to Prussia in September, they stopped in Lübeck. After the cruise, Jäger completed her trials, which ended on 12 October, when she was decommissioned. The ship was then towed to the island of Dänholm near Stralsund, where she was laid up ashore. While out of service, her copper sheathing was removed from her hull so ventilation holes could be cut into the outer planking. Her entire propulsion system, including the masts and the funnel, was removed and a roof was erected over the hull to keep the elements out.

The ship remained out of service for the next few years. On 8 December 1863, the Prussian Navy ordered the fleet to mobilize, as tensions between Prussia and Denmark over the Schleswig–Holstein question rose sharply. Mobilization meant that Jäger and the rest of the gunboats at Stralsund would have to be reconstructed. She next recommissioned on 21 February 1864, shortly after the outbreak of the Second Schleswig War against Denmark. She was assigned to III Flotilla Division, under the command of Leutnant zur See (Lieutenant at Sea) Johann-Heinrich Pirner. The Prussian gunboat divisions were assigned to guard the main Prussian ports on the Baltic coast, namely Stralsund, Stettin, and Swinemünde after the Royal Danish Navy imposed a blockade of the ports. III and V Divisions were based in Stralsund to defend the Kubitzer Bodden and the Bay of Greifswald. In the aftermath of the Battle of Jasmund in mid-March, Prince Adalbert, the Prussian naval commander, ordered all five gunboat divisions to concentrate at Stralsund on 29 March to support the Prussian Army's invasion of the island of Als, but bad weather prevented the vessels from taking part in the operation.

Following a ceasefire in May, the Prussian fleet held a naval review in Swinemünde for King Wilhelm I on 6 June; the aviso Loreley led the gunboat divisions during the review. The ceasefire did not hold, and Jäger participated in a battle with Danish naval forces off Hiddensee on 3 July. A formal armistice then went into effect on 20 July. After the fighting ended, she was decommissioned on 23 September, and on 20 October, the combatants signed the Treaty of Vienna, formally ending the war. An inspection of Jäger's hull revealed damage below the waterline and burned planks near the boilers.

Jäger was recommissioned again on 24 July 1870 after the start of the Franco-Prussian War earlier that month. Commanded by LzS Gustav Stempel, she was deployed to the mouth of the Elbe river to defend the area against French warships, but she saw no action during the conflict. She was later moved to the mouth of the Weser river, but encountered no French vessels there either. She was decommissioned on 8 April 1871, and unlike most of her sister ships, she was not modernized in 1872, owing to her poor condition. She was instead struck from the naval register on 19 March 1872. She was initially used as a target ship in Wilhelmshaven, but was later converted into a coal storage hulk, a role she filled until the early 1880s, when she was broken up.
