= Otto Livonius =

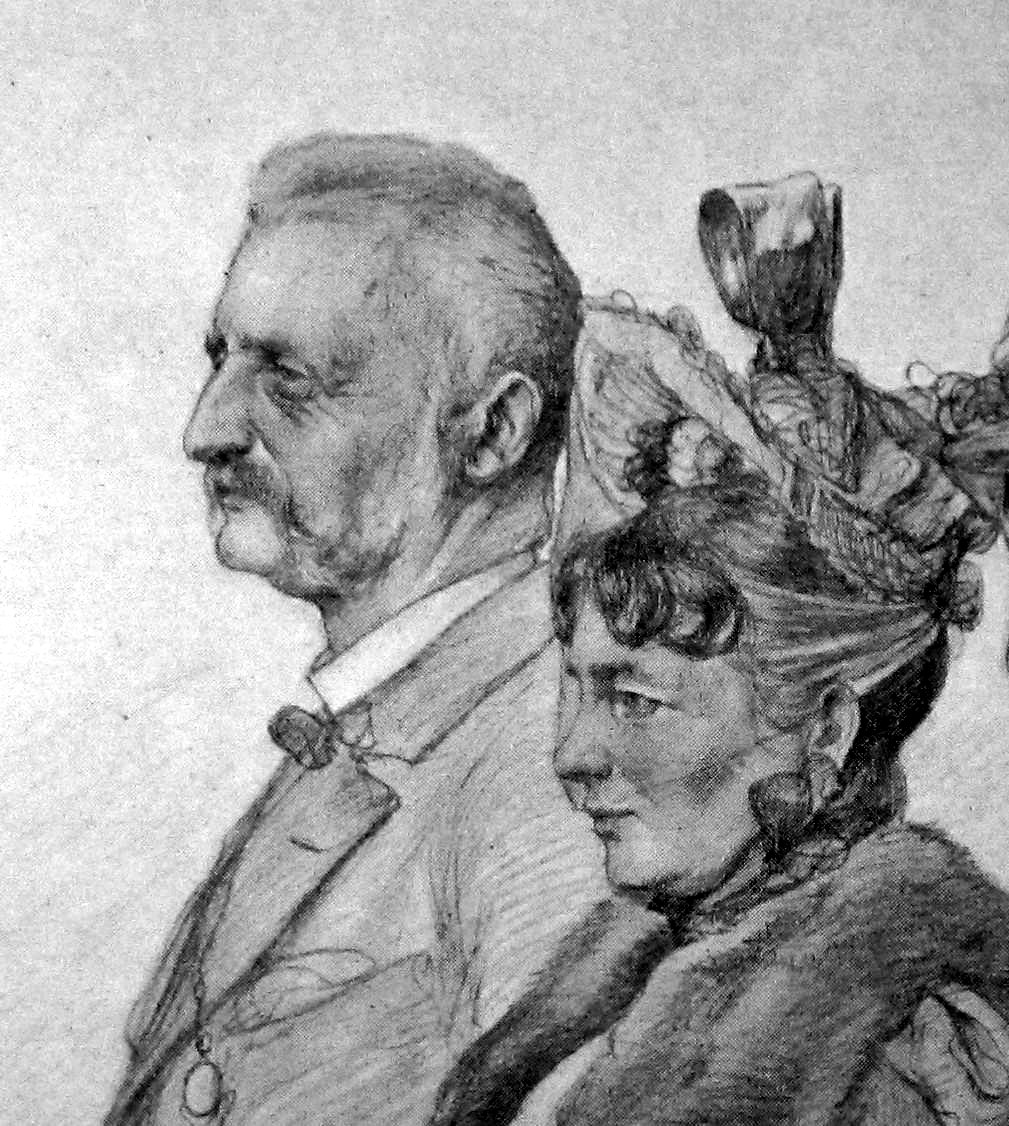
- Vice admiral Otto Livonius and his wife
- Born: April 1, 1829; Wolgast, Pomerania
- Died: February 9, 1917 (aged 87); Berlin, Germany
- Relatives: Wilhelm von Livonius
- Military career
- Allegiance: German Empire
- Branch: Imperial German Navy
- Service years: 1848-1884
- Rank: Vizeadmiral
- Commands: SMS Arminius; SMS Elisabeth; Imperial Shipyard Danzig
- Conflicts: Battle of Jasmund (1864); Franco-Prussian War

Otto Daniel Livonius (1 April 1829 – 9 February 1917) was a Vizeadmiral (Vice Admiral) of the German Imperial Navy, serving in the predecessor Prussian Navy and the Navy of the North German Confederation.

== Family and early life ==
Livonius was born 1 April 1829 in Wolgast in the Prussian province Pomerania. His father was Daniel Livonius a captain and postmaster in the Kingdom of Prussia. His brother Wilhelm Livonius became a general and was ennobled in 1888.

Livonius left school 1848 in Berlin in order to start sea travelling. After six months on the sailing ship Washington, he became a naval cadet in the Prussian Navy. Livonius was married with Louise Radmann.

== Naval career ==
Livonius became a naval cadet, on 7 December 1848 in Stettin. He attended Stettin Naval School.

During the Second Schleswig War of 1864, he was Kapitänleutnant (Captain Lieutenant) and First Officer on the Prussian screw corvette SMS Nymphe. At the naval action off Jasmund (Isle of Rügen) on 17 March 1864, he was wounded and conferred with the Order of the Red Eagle.

In 1866, Prussia became part of the North German Confederation, the navy officially became the North German Federal Navy; Livonius passed into service with the new institution.

In 1869, he was commander of the gunboat SMS Pfeil.

During the Franco-Prussian War of 1870–1871 he commanded the ironclad warship SMS Arminius. At the outbreak of the war Arminius was stationed in Kiel, but Livonius managed to break through the French blockade by hugging the Swedish coast. The passage through Swedish territorial waters protected the ship from French attack. The navy concentrated Arminius and the armored frigates Kronprinz, Friedrich Carl, and König Wilhelm in the North Sea naval base Wilhelmshaven. In the course of the war, Livonius sortied from the port over forty times, but failed to result in major combat, though he occasionally traded shots with the blockading French warships.

The unification of Germany as the German Empire in 1871 again meant a change of name, to the German Imperial Navy. From 1872 to 1875, he commanded the screw frigate SMS Elisabeth. On 2 May 1874 Livonius was promoted to Kapitän zur See (Captain at Sea).

In 1875–1876, Livonius was commanding officer of the East Asia Squadron.

From 1877 to 1881 Livonius became director of the Imperial Shipyard Danzig. On 15 February 1881 Livonius was promoted to Konteradmiral (rear admiral). As of 13 December 1881, Livonius was a director with the German Imperial Admiralty where he served until 27 December 1883, when he was promoted to Vizeadmiral (Vice admiral). On 2 February 1884, he was transferred to the retired list.

He died on 9 February 1917, aged 87, in Berlin.

== Honors ==
- Order of the Red Eagle

== Works ==
- Die Marine des Norddeutschen Bundes, ihre Bedeutung und ihre bisherige Entwicklung nebst einer erläuternden Angabe aller gesetzlichen Bestimmungen über die Aufnahme in den Dienst der königlichen Marine und der Aussichten der Aufgenommenen. Liebrecht, Berlin 1869.
- Unsere Flotte im deutsch-französischen Kriege. Mittler & Sohn, Berlin 1871.
- Colonialfrage. Berlin 1900. 68 S.
- Über die Vorrichtungen zur Rettung von Menschenleben bei See-Unfällen. Berlin 1900.
