= SMS Hay (1860) =

Prussian gunboat

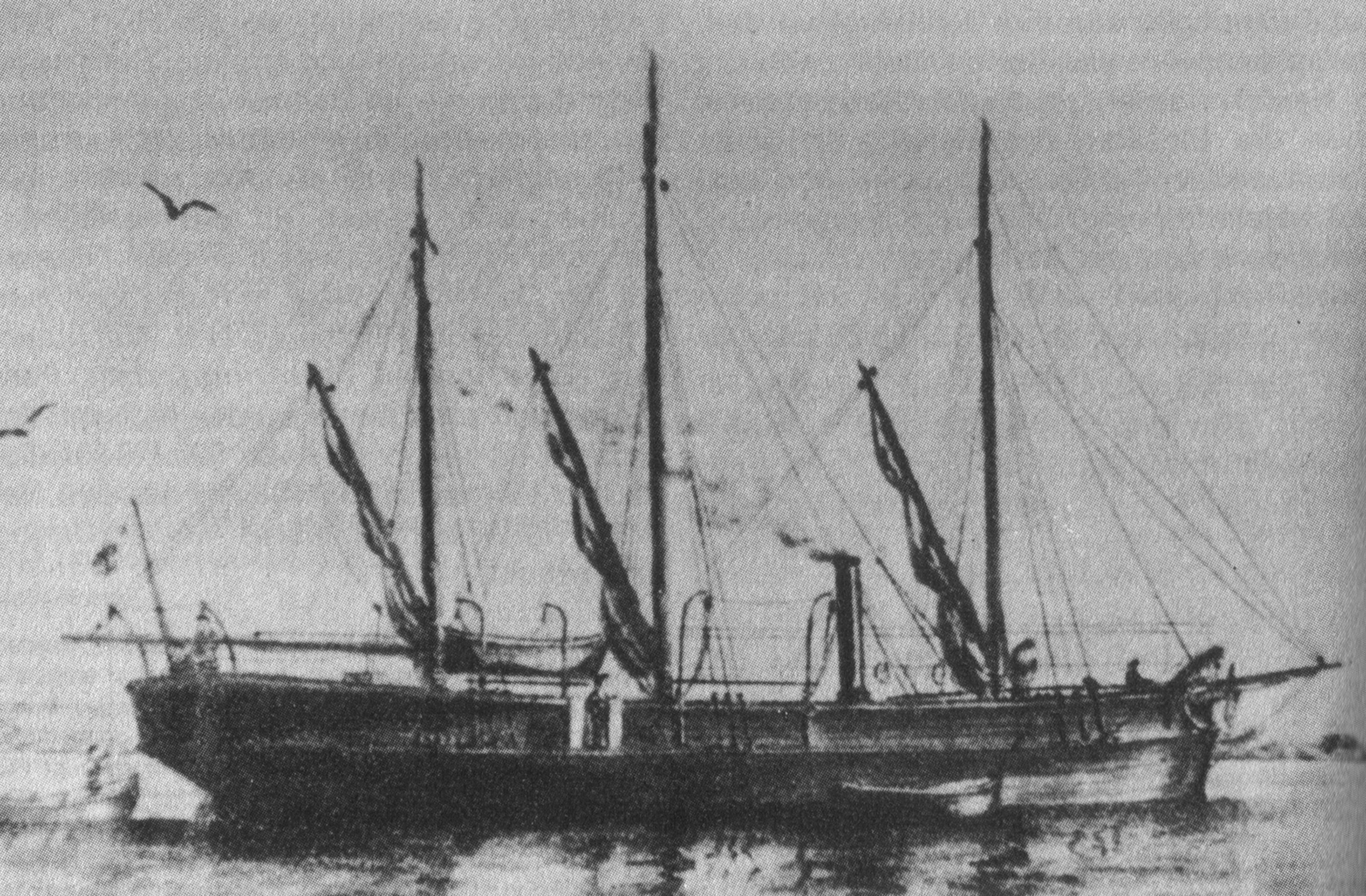
- Hay's sister Fuchs

History
- Name: Hay
- Operator: Prussian Navy; Imperial German Navy
- Builder: J. W. Klawitter, Danzig
- Laid down: 1859
- Launched: 14 February 1860
- Commissioned: 1860
- Decommissioned: 7 October 1872
- Stricken: 7 September 1880

General characteristics
- Type: Jäger-class gunboat
- Displacement: Design: 237 t (233 long tons); Full load: 283 t (279 long tons)
- Length: 41.2 m (135 ft 2 in)
- Beam: 6.69 m (21 ft 11 in)
- Draft: 2.2 m (7 ft 3 in)
- Installed power: 4 × boilers; 220 PS (220 ihp)
- Propulsion: 2 × marine steam engines; 1 × screw propeller
- Speed: 9 knots (17 km/h; 10 mph)
- Complement: 2 officers; 38 enlisted
- Armament: 1 × 24-pounder gun; 2 × 12-pounder guns

SMS Hay was a steam gunboat of the Jäger class built for the Prussian Navy in the late 1850s and early 1860s. The ship was ordered as part of a program to strengthen Prussia's coastal defense forces, then oriented against neighboring Denmark. She was armed with a battery of three guns. The ship saw very little activity during her career. She was activated during the Second Schleswig War against Denmark in 1864, and she saw brief action during the Battle of Jasmund on 17 March. Hay also participated in the Franco-Prussian War in 1870, but she did not engage any French forces during the conflict. The ship saw little further use and was struck from the naval register in 1880; she was then converted into a coal storage barge, but her ultimate fate is unknown.

== Design ==
Profile drawing showing the internal arrangement of the class

The Jäger class of steam gunboats came about as a result of a program to strengthen the Prussian Navy in the late 1850s in the aftermath of the First Schleswig War against Denmark. The wartime Reichsflotte (Imperial Fleet) had been dissolved, but tensions with Denmark remained high. In 1859, Prince Regent Wilhelm approved a construction program for some fifty-two gunboats to be built over the next fifteen years, which began with the fifteen vessels of the Jäger class. These ships were intended to defend the Prussian coast in the event of another war with Denmark.

Hay was 41.2 meters (135 ft 2 in) long overall, with a beam of 6.69 m (21 ft 11 in) and a draft of 2.2 m (7 ft 3 in). She displaced 237 metric tons (233 long tons) normally and 283 t (279 long tons) at full load. The ship's crew consisted of 2 officers and 38 enlisted men. She was powered by a pair of marine steam engines that drove one 3-bladed screw propeller, with steam provided by four coal-fired trunk boilers, which gave her a top speed of 9.1 knots (16.9 km/h; 10.5 mph) at 220 metric horsepower (220 ihp). As built, she was equipped with a three-masted schooner rig, which was later removed. The Jäger-class gunboats handled badly and tended to take on water in heavy seas. The ship was armed with a battery of one rifled 24-pounder muzzle-loading gun and two rifled 12-pounder muzzle-loading guns.

== Service history ==
Illustration of a Jäger-class gunboat

Hay was built at the J. W. Klawitter shipyard in Danzig. Her keel was laid down in 1859 and she was launched on 14 February 1860. The ship was named after sharks. (Note: Hay is an older variation of the German Haifisch.) During the launching ceremony, the chain used to lower the ship down the slipway broke, but the ship was not damaged in the accident. After completion in late 1860, Hay was moved to Stralsund and was then laid up on the nearby island of Dänholm. While out of service, her copper sheathing was removed from her hull so ventilation holes could be cut into the outer planking. Her entire propulsion system, including the masts and the funnel, was removed and a roof was erected over the hull to keep the elements out.

=== Second Schleswig War ===
The ship remained out of service for the next few years. On 8 December 1863, the Prussian Navy ordered the fleet to mobilize, as tensions between Prussia and Denmark over the Schleswig–Holstein question rose sharply. Mobilization meant that Hay and the rest of the gunboats at Stralsund would have to be reconstructed. After the start of the Second Schleswig War in February 1864, Hay was recommissioned on 1 March to join I Flotilla Division. The Prussian gunboat divisions were assigned to guard the main Prussian ports on the Baltic coast, namely Stralsund, Stettin, and Swinemünde after the Royal Danish Navy imposed a blockade of the ports.

The gunboat flotilla was deployed on 17 March to support Captain Eduard von Jachmann's corvettes as they attempted to break the Danish blockade, but the gunboats were only lightly engaged during the ensuing Battle of Jasmund. Jachmann had ordered them to take up a position closer to land to cover a potential withdrawal, and so they were too far to take part in the main action. Nevertheless, as the Danish steam frigate Tordenskjold arrived to reinforce the main squadron, Hay and the other gunboats fired on her from afar. Tordenskjold's commander ignored the gunboats and continued south to join the fight with Jachmann's corvettes, firing only a few broadsides at the gunboats in passing, with neither side scoring any hits. As the Danes continued south in pursuit of Jachmann's ships, the gunboats withdrew back to Stralsund, though Hay's engines broke down and she had to be taken under tow by her sister Sperber. Hay was decommissioned in Stralsund in October and placed back in reserve. The combatants signed the Treaty of Vienna on 20 October, formally ending the war.

=== Later career ===
The Prussian naval command initially planned on mobilizing Hay at the start of the Austro-Prussian War in 1866, but the war ended quickly in a Prussian victory and activating the ship proved to be unnecessary. The ship was instead eventually recommissioned on 1 July 1869 to serve as a tender for the Marinestation der Ostsee (Baltic Sea Naval Station), based in Kiel. During this period, Hay and the transport Elbe carried a Mine Detachment to Bremerhaven; these mines would later be used to defend the entrance to Jade Bight during the Franco-Prussian War the following year. Hay was then placed back into reserve at Kiel on 20 November. The ship next returned to service on 18 July 1870, under the command of Leutnant zur See (LzS—Lieutenant at Sea) Iwan Friedrich Julius Oldekop, after the start of hostilities with France. Six days later, she joined Sperber and the gunboat Comet to steam to the North Sea, passing around Denmark and arriving in the mouth of the Elbe river on 28 July. The ship saw no action while patrolling Prussia's North Sea coast, and on 4 April 1871, she left Wilhelmshaven to return to Kiel, this time passing through the Eider Canal.

After arriving in Kiel on 12 April, she resumed tender duties for the naval station there, and she also served as the tender for the artillery training ship Renown. Hay was decommissioned on 4 July 1872, but already on 22 July, she was recommissioned to replace her sister Schwalbe, which was by then no longer fit for service. At this time, LzS Richard Aschenborn took command of the ship. After completing the shooting practice exercise on 5 August, Aschenborn left the ship, and Hay was then moved to Wilhelmshaven and decommissioned there on 7 October. There, Hay underwent a refit that included replacing her main gun with a more modern, iron 15 cm (5.9 in) RK L/22 gun. Her sailing rig was removed and a simple pole mast was fitted for signaling purposes. The ship never returned to active service, however, and on 7 September 1880, she was struck from the naval register and thereafter converted into a storage hulk in Wilhelmshaven. Her ultimate fate is unknown.
