= Jäger-class gunboat =

Class of Prussian gunboats

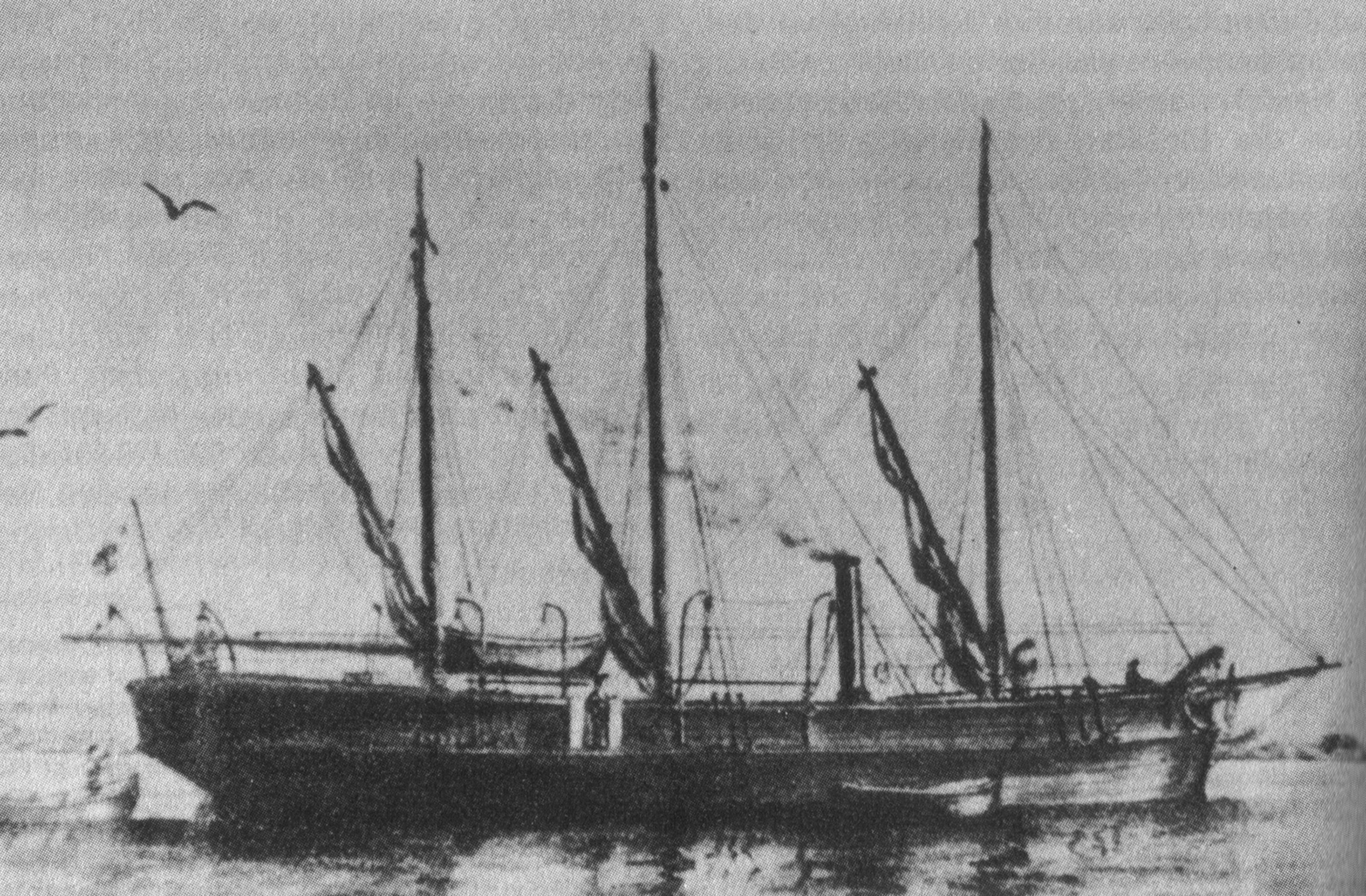
- SMS Fuchs

Class overview
- Preceded by: None
- Succeeded by: Camäleon class
- Built: 1859–1860
- Planned: 15
- Completed: 15

General characteristics
- Type: Gunboat
- Displacement: Design: 237 t (233 long tons); Full load: 283 t (279 long tons)
- Length: 41.2 m (135 ft 2 in)
- Beam: 6.69 m (21 ft 11 in)
- Draft: 2.2 m (7 ft 3 in)
- Installed power: 4 × boilers; 220 PS (220 ihp)
- Propulsion: 2 × marine steam engines; 1 × screw propeller
- Speed: 9 kn (17 km/h; 10 mph)
- Complement: 2 officers; 38 enlisted
- Armament: 1 × 24-pounder gun; 2 × 12-pounder guns

Fifteen Jäger class gunboats were constructed for the Prussian Navy in the late 1850s and early 1860s. The class, which were the first steam gunboats built for the Prussian fleet, included Jäger, Crocodill, Fuchs, Hay, Scorpion, Sperber, Hyäne, Habicht, Pfeil, Natter, Schwalbe, Salamander, Wespe, Tiger, and Wolf.

The Prussians armed the ships with three guns and planned to task them with guarding the country's coastline along the shallow waters of the Baltic Sea. However, as they proved to handle poorly in service, they instead spent much of their existences laid up ashore. Several of the boats were activated during the Second Schleswig War in 1864, and some took part in a minor battle against Danish warships. Crocodill was scrapped in 1867 due to advancing dry rot, but the rest of the class remained in the fleet's inventory into the 1870s. After being discarded by the navy, most of the ships served on as storage barges, usually for naval mines, though Jäger and Wolf were sunk as target ships.

== Design ==
Following the dissolution of the Reichsflotte in 1852, the leaders of the Prussian Navy sought resources to expand its forces to defend Prussia's coastline, which was extended in 1853 with the acquisition of the area that would become the port of Wilhelmshaven. In 1855, King Wilhelm IV signed what became known as the Fleet Foundation Plan of 1855, which authorized a total force of 42 sail- and oar-powered gunboats. By 1859, increasing tensions with neighboring Denmark led the Prussian Landtag (parliament) to demand a more powerful force. General Helmuth von Moltke, the new chief of the Prussian General Staff, issued a memorandum on 2 April 1859 calling for a strengthened fleet to guard Prussia's coast. Konteradmiral (Rear Admiral) Jan Schröder, the head of the Prussian Naval Ministry, and Robert von Patow, the finance minister, responded with a larger program that included a total of 52 steam-powered gunboats to be built between 1860 and 1875. These would replace the sail- and oar-powered boats, some of which dated from the Reichsflotte of the late 1840s. On 2 June 1859, Prince Regent Wilhelm approved the construction of the first twenty of these vessels. The preferences of the commander in chief of the navy, Prince Adalbert, who sought an ocean-going fleet, were ignored.

Specifications were set for a ship at around 250 metric tons (246 long tons; 276 short tons) displacement, powered by an engine rated for 230 metric horsepower (170 kW), and carrying an armament of three guns. Meanwhile, Chief Constructor Carl Elbertzhagen had already begun collecting information on steam gunboats being built in Britain, France, Russia, and Brazil, to determine what characteristics the new Prussian vessels should have. Elbertzhagen prepared two gunboat designs: a smaller vessel to meet the design requirements, which became the Jäger class, and a substantially larger version that became the Camäleon class. All were to be built domestically, and of the first twenty vessels to be built, fifteen were to be of the Jäger type and four were to be Camäleon-class gunboats. The Landtag requested that the ships be built so as to allow civilian use in peacetime, like the aviso Preussischer Adler. (Note: Nottelmann does not account for the twentieth vessel authorized.)

The navy initially wanted to build two vessels to test them before beginning larger-scale production, but the tensions with Denmark meant that the vessels could not be delayed. Contracts for the fifteen Jäger-class gunboats were awarded to eight different shipyards. Iron components had to be imported from Britain because Prussian industry could not meet the demand, which led to delays. Further difficulties arose from the inexperience of some of the shipyards, which further slowed construction times.

=== Characteristics ===
Profile drawing showing the internal arrangement of the class

Illustration of a Jäger-class gunboat

The ships of the Jäger class were 38 meters (124 ft 8 in) long at the waterline and 41.2 m (135 ft 2 in) long overall, with a beam of 6.69 m (21 ft 11 in) and a draft of 2.2 m (7 ft 3 in). They displaced 237 metric tons (233 long tons) normally and up to 283 t (279 long tons) at full load. Each vessel had a carvel hull built from oak that was sheathed with a layer of copper to protect it from corrosion and biofouling. The ships' crew consisted of 2 officers and 38 enlisted men. Each gunboat carried a pair of small boats. Steering was controlled via a single rudder. The Jäger-class gunboats handled poorly and rolled severely; they tended to be very wet. They were unable to steam in a head sea, and under sail power alone, were effectively immobile. The ships' poor handling earned them the nickname "seeferkel" (sea pigs).

They were powered by a pair of horizontal, single-cylinder marine steam engines that drove one 3-bladed screw propeller and four coal-fired trunk boilers. The boilers were arranged in a single boiler room and vented through a single funnel. The ships had a top speed of 9 knots (17 km/h; 10 mph) from 220 metric horsepower (220 ihp). The ships had a designed storage capacity for 31 t (31 long tons) of coal for the boilers. As built, each ship was equipped with a three-masted schooner rig to supplement the steam engines. During combat, the mizzenmast could be laid flat so as to not block the firing arcs of the guns. In a refit conducted in 1872, all ships still in service had their sailing rigs removed.

The ships were armed with a battery of one rifled 24-pounder muzzle-loading gun and two rifled 12-pounder muzzle-loading guns. These were new guns, which were plagued with difficulties in service. The ships' severe rolling had negative effects on the ability of the gunners to aim the weapons. In the 1872 refit, all of the surviving ships were rearmed with a single 15 cm (5.9 in) RK L/22 breechloading gun, and in 1878, Fuchs received a single 87 mm (3.4 in) breechloading gun instead.

== Ships ==
Construction data
Ship	Builder	Laid down	Launched	Commissioned
Jäger	Mitzlaff, Elbing	1859	January 1860	15 June 1861
Crocodill	Mitzlaff, Elbing	1859	1860	1860
Fuchs	J W Klawitter, Danzig	1859	14 February 1860	1860
Hay	J W Klawitter, Danzig	1859	14 February 1860	Late 1860
Scorpion	Domcke, Grabow	1859	14 February 1860	25 June 1861
Sperber	Domcke, Grabow	1859	14 February 1860	11 February 1864
Hyäne	Keier & Derient, Danzig	1859	April 1860	Late 1860
Habicht	Keier & Derient, Danzig	1859	1860	Late 1860
Pfeil	Lübke, Wolgast	1859	14 February 1860	11 February 1864
Natter	Lübke, Wolgast	1859	14 February 1860	1 March 1864
Schwalbe	A E Nüscke, Grabow	1859	14 February 1860	1 March 1864
Salamander	A E Nüscke, Grabow	1859	14 February 1860	20 June 1861
Wespe	Zieske, Stettin	1859	14 February 1860	11 February 1864
Tiger	Zieske, Stettin	1859	14 February 1860	3 March 1864
Wolf	Liegnitz, Grabow	1859	29 April 1860	21 February 1864

== Service history ==
Illustration of a Jäger-class gunboat

The ships were intended for use as part of Prussia's coastal defense system, but their poor handling led to very infrequent service. They spent much of their careers laid up on land, and during this period, their copper sheathing was removed from the hulls so ventilation holes could be cut into the outer planking. Their entire propulsion system, including the masts and the funnel, was removed and roofs were erected over the hulls to keep the elements out.

During the Second Schleswig War against Denmark in 1864, Hay, Hyäne, Pfeil, Scorpion, and Wespe were mobilized as part of the 1st Gunboat Division, led by the gunboat Comet. They first saw action against the Danish steam frigate Tordenskjold at the Battle of Jasmund on 17 March. While on patrol in the Baltic Sea on 14 April, they briefly engaged the Danish ship of the line Skjold and the steam frigate Sjælland in a short and inconclusive action. Though the gunboats had little combat value against the much larger Danish warships, the Danes overestimated their capabilities, which led them to fail to press their blockade of Prussia's coast effectively.

The efforts to preserve the gunboats during their long inactive periods were not entirely successful, and already in 1867, Crocodill was badly dry rotted; she was according struck from the naval register on 14 March that year and thereafter broken up. The rest of the class was activated during the Franco-Prussian War to defend Prussia's coast, primarily operating in the North Sea, either at the Jade Bight or the mouths of the Elbe, Weser, or Ems rivers, though Scorpion and Tiger were stationed at Kiel and Salamander was based at Swinemünde, both in the Baltic. On 19 March 1872, Jäger, Schwalbe, and Wespe were struck from the register. Jäger was later sunk as a target ship, while the latter two became mine storage barges, both being renamed Minenprahm No 1, based at Kiel and Wilhelmshaven, respectively. Pfeil was struck the same day, but she was instead converted into a mine storage barge under the name Minenprahm No 2, based at Wilhelmshaven. Hyäne was struck on 17 July 1873 and also expended as a target. Hay served as a tender for the artillery training ship Renown in 1872.Through the early- to mid-1870s, Salamander was used as a tender for other vessels, including the training ship Niobe and the screw corvette Ariadne.

Wolf was struck on 26 September 1875, initially being used as a coal storage hulk in Danzig. Sperber served as a tender for the Marinestation der Ostsee (Naval Station of the Baltic Sea) from 1875 to 1877. During the same period, Scorpion was assigned to tender duties for Renown. Scorpion and Tiger were struck from the naval register on 9 January 1877, the former thereafter becoming a barge based in Kiel and the latter becoming the mine storage barge No 4 at Wilhelmshaven. Habicht saw some use as a tender for Renown in 1877, before being struck on 27 November, also being converted into a barge. In 1878, Fuchs was converted into a tender for the gunnery school and Wolf was moved to Kiel for use as a mine storage barge. On 12 November that year, Sperber and Salamander were also struck, both thereafter being used as a barge in Kiel.

Hay and Natter were both struck from the register on 7 September 1880; Hay was converted for use as a storage hulk, but Natter's fate is unrecorded. In 1878, Fuchs took over tender duties for Renown, and served in limited training exercises as well, until 1882 when Renown was replaced by the new, purpose-built gunnery training ship Mars. Fuchs was herself decommissioned in June that year, before being struck from the register on 14 November. She was converted into a mine storage barge, and was renamed No 3. She was based at Wilhelmshaven. Wolf was destroyed in torpedo experiments on 5 August 1884 during tests with the torpedo training ship Blücher. The wreck was eventually raised and scrapped in Kiel. The fates of the surviving ships are unknown.
