= SMS Fuchs =

Prussian gunboat

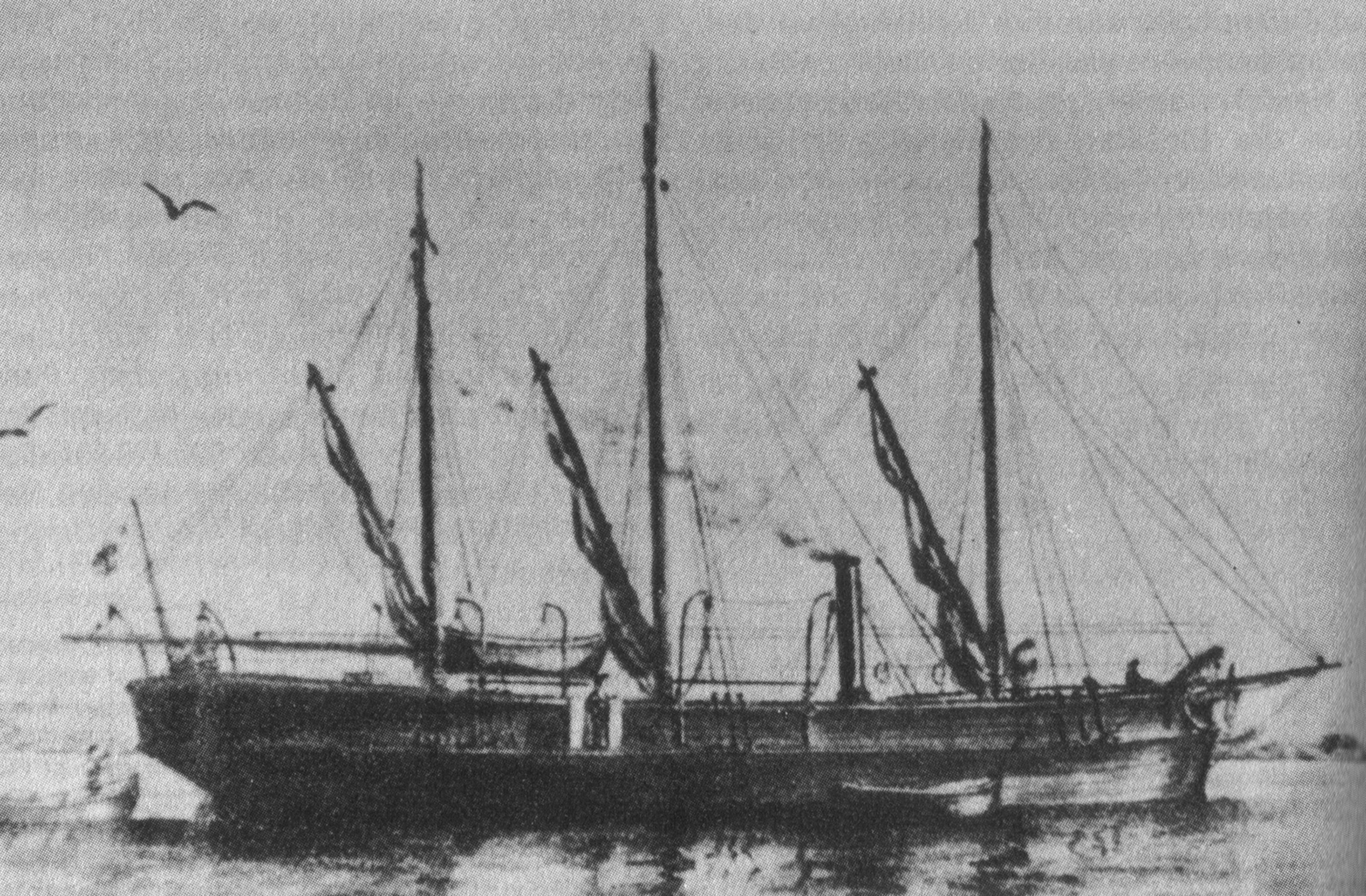
- Fuchs

History
- Name: Fuchs
- Operator: Prussian Navy; Imperial German Navy
- Builder: J. W. Klawitter, Danzig
- Laid down: 1859
- Launched: 14 February 1860
- Commissioned: 1860
- Decommissioned: 27 June 1882
- Stricken: 14 November 1882
- Fate: Broken up

General characteristics
- Type: Jäger-class gunboat
- Displacement: Design: 237 t (233 long tons); Full load: 283 t (279 long tons)
- Length: 41.2 m (135 ft 2 in)
- Beam: 6.69 m (21 ft 11 in)
- Draft: 2.2 m (7 ft 3 in)
- Installed power: 4 × boilers; 220 PS (220 ihp)
- Propulsion: 2 × marine steam engines; 1 × screw propeller
- Speed: 9 knots (17 km/h; 10 mph)
- Complement: 2 officers; 38 enlisted
- Armament: 1 × 24-pounder gun; 2 × 12-pounder guns

SMS Fuchs was a steam gunboat of the Jäger class built for the Prussian Navy in the late 1850s and early 1860s. The ship was ordered as part of a program to strengthen Prussia's coastal defense forces, then oriented against neighboring Denmark. She was armed with a battery of three guns. The ship saw limited time in service. She was activated during the Second Schleswig War in 1864 and the Franco-Prussian War in 1870, but she did not engage enemy vessels during either conflict. Fuchs served as a gunnery training ship in the late 1870s and early 1880s, and was then used as a storage hulk for a few years before being broken up.

== Design ==
Profile drawing showing the internal arrangement of the class

The Jäger class of steam gunboats came about as a result of a program to strengthen the Prussian Navy in the late 1850s in the aftermath of the First Schleswig War against Denmark. The wartime Reichsflotte (Imperial Fleet) had been dissolved, but tensions with Denmark remained high. In 1859, Prince Regent Wilhelm approved a construction program for some fifty-two gunboats to be built over the next fifteen years, which began with the fifteen vessels of the Jäger class. These ships were intended to defend the Prussian coast in the event of another war with Denmark.

Fuchs was 41.2 meters (135 ft 2 in) long overall, with a beam of 6.69 m (21 ft 11 in) and a draft of 2.2 m (7 ft 3 in). She displaced 237 metric tons (233 long tons) normally and 283 t (279 long tons) at full load. The ship's crew consisted of 2 officers and 38 enlisted men. She was powered by a pair of marine steam engines that drove one 3-bladed screw propeller, with steam provided by four coal-fired trunk boilers, which gave her a top speed of 9.1 knots (16.9 km/h; 10.5 mph) at 220 metric horsepower (220 ihp). As built, she was equipped with a three-masted schooner rig, which was later removed. The Jäger-class gunboats handled badly and tended to take on water in heavy seas. The ship was armed with a battery of one rifled 24-pounder muzzle-loading gun and two rifled 12-pounder muzzle-loading guns.

== Service history ==
Illustration of a Jäger-class gunboat

Fuchs was built at the J. W. Klawitter shipyard in Danzig. Her keel was laid down in 1859 and she was launched on 14 February 1860. The ship was completed later that year and after completing her initial sea trials, she moved to Stralsund and was then laid up on the nearby island of Dänholm. On 25 June 1861, Fuchs was recommissioned for further testing. She then joined a gunboat flotilla led by the gunboat Camäleon for training exercises. During this period, she joined the gunboats Camäleon, Comet, Jäger, Salamander, and Scorpion for a visit to Skagen in Denmark and the free imperial cities of Hamburg and Bremen. After the stop in Skagen, the corvette Amazone and the schooner Hela joined the flotilla of gunboats. While on their way back to Prussia in September, they stopped in Lübeck. The tour was concluded by September, after which Fuchs resumed her trials. These were completed on 12 October, and the ship thereafter returned to Stralsund to be placed in reserve. She was then towed back to Dänholm for storage. While out of service, her copper sheathing was removed from her hull so ventilation holes could be cut into the outer planking. Her entire propulsion system, including the masts and the funnel, was removed and a roof was erected over the hull to keep the elements out.

The ship remained out of service for the next few years. On 8 December 1863, the Prussian Navy ordered the fleet to mobilize, as tensions between Prussia and Denmark over the Schleswig–Holstein question rose sharply. Mobilization meant that Fuchs and the rest of the gunboats at Stralsund would have to be reconstructed. After the start of the Second Schleswig War in February 1864, Fuchs was recommissioned on 1 March to join the Flotilla Division. The ship was initially commanded by Leutnant zur See (Lieutenant at Sea) Franz von Waldersee. The Prussian gunboat divisions were assigned to guard the main Prussian ports on the Baltic coast, namely Stralsund, Stettin, and Swinemünde after the Royal Danish Navy imposed a blockade of the ports. Following the Prussian victories early in the short war, the fleet held a parade for now-King Wilhelm in June, and Fuchs was present for the event. The ship then sailed to Swinemünde for repairs the following month. Modifications to the ship were also made, including lengthening her bow. On 20 July, a ceasefire took effect, which led to negotiations to end the war. The ship was decommissioned on 18 October and placed back in reserve. Two days later, the combatants signed the Treaty of Vienna, formally ending the war.

Fuchs remained out of service for over five years until the outbreak of the Franco-Prussian War in July 1870. The ship was recommissioned on 24 July and was sent through the Eider Canal to Wilhelmshaven, where she carried out local defensive patrols. The ship was also used to tow other vessels in the area. Fuchs was damaged during this period, which necessitated repairs at Bremerhaven. In late 1870, she remained idle in Wilhelmshaven, and in January 1871, she moved to the mouth of the Elbe river, where she conducted defensive patrols until the end of the war late that month. Fuchs then served as a tender in Wilhelmshaven while the defensive mine barriers protecting the approaches to the Jade were removed. In August, she was assigned to the newly created Torpedo Department, where she served until 8 December, when she was decommissioned.

In 1872, Fuchs underwent a refit that included replacing her main gun with a more modern, iron 15 cm (5.9 in) RK L/22 gun. Her sailing rig was removed and a simple pole mast was fitted for signaling purposes. She remained out of service for the next six years, during which time the 15 cm gun was replaced with a lighter 8.7 cm (3.4 in) gun. On 1 April 1878, she was recommissioned to serve as an artillery training ship and a tender for the primary artillery school ship, Renown. In early 1880, she received a 3.7 cm (1.5 in) Hotchkiss revolver cannon, and she returned to training duties on 1 April. The following year, her training schedule lasted from 1 April to 27 August, but this year, Renown was replaced by the new training ship Mars. Fuchs recommissioned for the last time on 1 April 1882 for another training program that lasted until 27 June. She was then struck from the naval register on 14 November. She was renamed Minenprahm III (Mine Barge III) for use as a storage hulk based in Wilhelmshaven. The ship was used in this capacity for a few years before being broken up in Wilhelmshaven.
