= Dänholm =

Island on the coast of Germany

Coordinates: 54°19′N 13°07′E

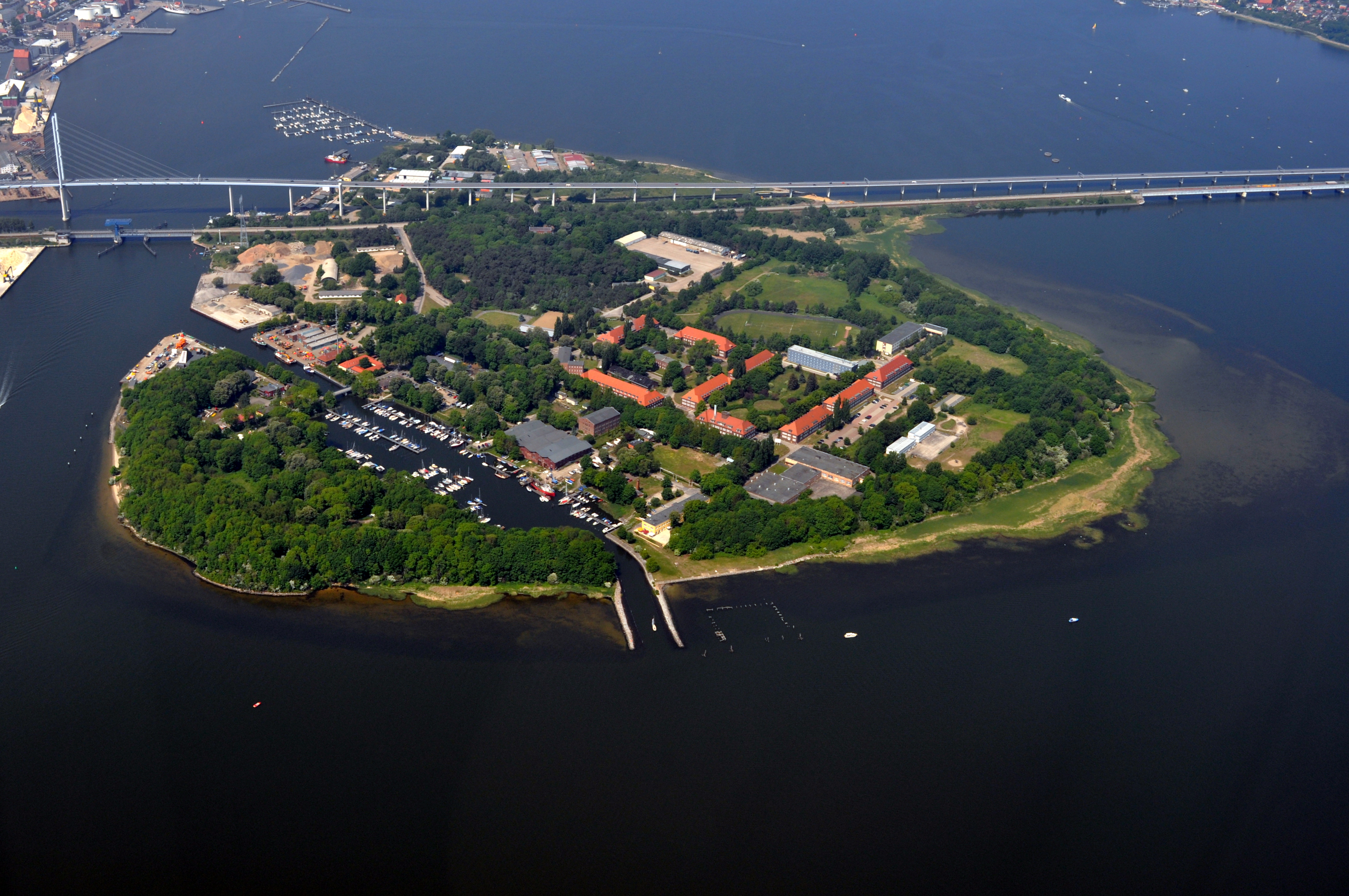
Dänholm island with the bridge connecting the city of Stralsund and the island of Rügen

Dänholm (literally Danes' Isle) is a small island on the German coast of the Baltic Sea. It is situated in the Strelasund just east of Stralsund. Both bridges linking Rügen with the mainland, Rügendamm and Rügenbrücke, run across it. The island was the scene of an incident between the Swedish and French armies in 1807, when it belonged to Swedish Pomerania during the Napoleonic Wars.

== Sources ==
This article is fully or partially based on material from Nordisk familjebok, 1904–1926.
