= SMS Scorpion (1860) =

Prussian gunboat

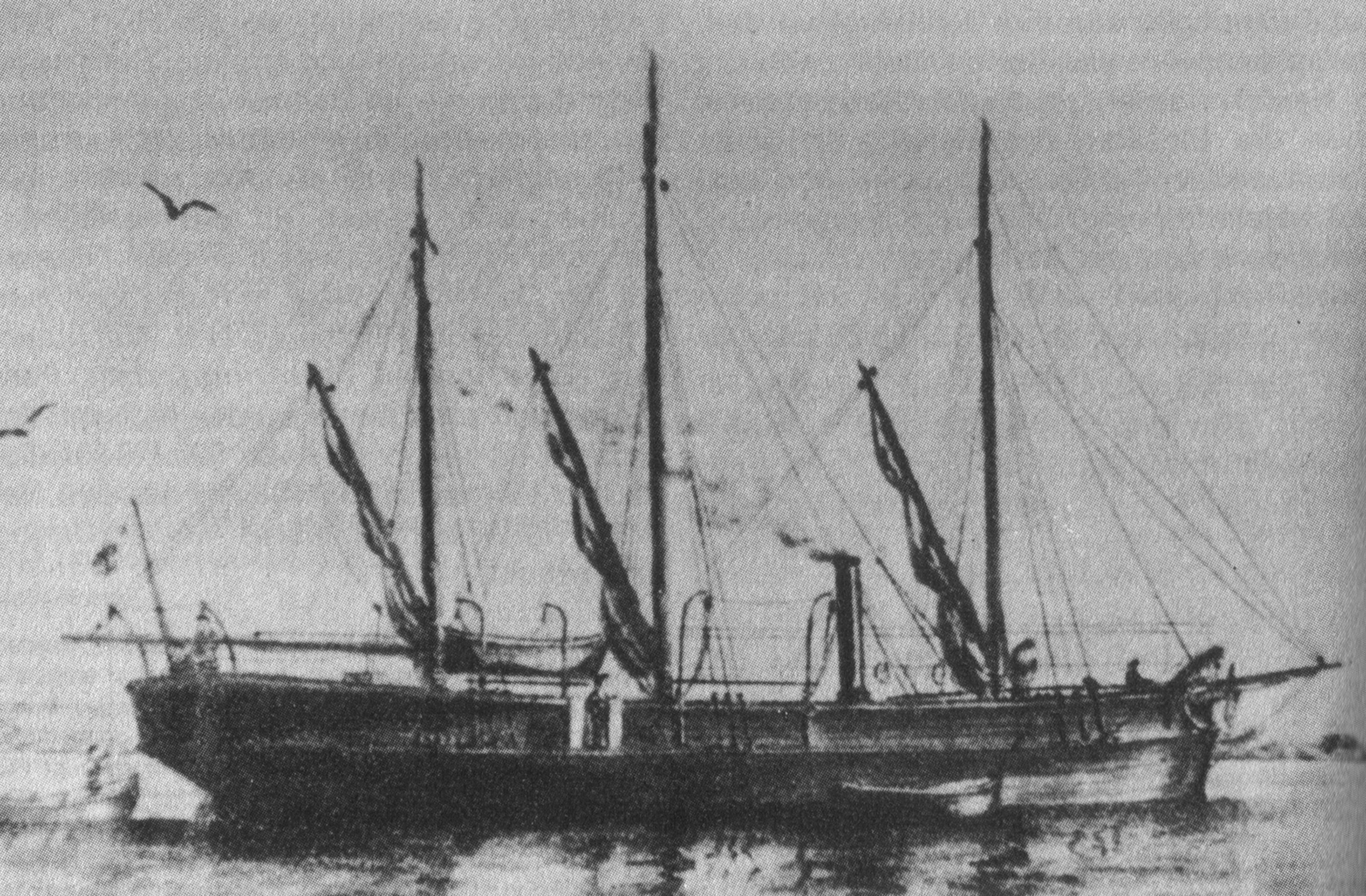
- Scorpion's sister Fuchs

History
- Name: Scorpion
- Operator: Prussian Navy; Imperial German Navy
- Laid down: 1859
- Launched: 14 February 1860
- Commissioned: 25 June 1861
- Decommissioned: 24 May 1871
- Stricken: 9 January 1877

General characteristics
- Type: Jäger-class gunboat
- Displacement: Design: 237 t (233 long tons); Full load: 283 t (279 long tons)
- Length: 41.2 m (135 ft 2 in)
- Beam: 6.69 m (21 ft 11 in)
- Draft: 2.2 m (7 ft 3 in)
- Installed power: 4 × boilers; 220 PS (220 ihp)
- Propulsion: 2 × marine steam engines; 1 × screw propeller
- Speed: 9 knots (17 km/h; 10 mph)
- Complement: 2 officers; 38 enlisted
- Armament: 1 × 24-pounder gun; 2 × 12-pounder guns

SMS Scorpion was a steam gunboat of the Jäger class built for the Prussian Navy in the late 1850s and early 1860s. The ship was ordered as part of a program to strengthen Prussia's coastal defense forces, then oriented against neighboring Denmark. She was armed with a battery of three guns. The ship saw very little activity during her career. She was activated during the Second Schleswig War against Denmark in 1864, and she saw brief action during the Battle of Jasmund on 17 March. Scorpion was commissioned during the Austro-Prussian War in 1866 and the Franco-Prussian War in 1870, but she did not engage any enemy forces during either conflict. The navy disposed of the ship in 1877 and she was later used as a coal storage barge. Her ultimate fate is unknown.

== Design ==
Profile drawing showing the internal arrangement of the class

The Jäger class of steam gunboats came about as a result of a program to strengthen the Prussian Navy in the late 1850s in the aftermath of the First Schleswig War against Denmark. The wartime Reichsflotte (Imperial Fleet) had been dissolved, but tensions with Denmark remained high. In 1859, Prince Regent Wilhelm approved a construction program for some fifty-two gunboats to be built over the next fifteen years, which began with the fifteen vessels of the Jäger class. These ships were intended to defend the Prussian coast in the event of another war with Denmark.

Scorpion was 41.2 meters (135 ft 2 in) long overall, with a beam of 6.69 m (21 ft 11 in) and a draft of 2.2 m (7 ft 3 in). She displaced 237 metric tons (233 long tons) normally and 283 t (279 long tons) at full load. The ship's crew consisted of 2 officers and 38 enlisted men. She was powered by a pair of marine steam engines that drove one 3-bladed screw propeller, with steam provided by four coal-fired trunk boilers, which gave her a top speed of 9.1 knots (16.9 km/h; 10.5 mph) at 220 metric horsepower (220 ihp). As built, she was equipped with a three-masted schooner rig, which was later removed. The Jäger-class gunboats handled badly and tended to take on water in heavy seas. The ship was armed with a battery of one rifled 24-pounder muzzle-loading gun and two rifled 12-pounder muzzle-loading guns.

== Service history ==
Illustration of a Jäger-class gunboat

Scorpion was built at the Domcke shipyard in Grabow. Her keel was laid down in 1859 and she was launched on 14 February 1860. Named after both the eponymous arachnids and the constellation Scorpius, Scorpion was completed in late 1860 and immediately sent to the island of Dänholm near Stralsund, where she was laid up in reserve. She was commissioned on 26 June 1861 to join a gunboat flotilla, which included Camäleon, Comet, Jäger, Salamander, and Fuchs for a visit to Skagen in Denmark and the free imperial cities of Hamburg and Bremen. After the stop in Skagen, the corvette Amazone and the schooner Hela joined the flotilla of gunboats. While on their way back to Prussia in September, they stopped in Lübeck. After arriving back in Prussia, Scorpion conducted sea trials that lasted until 15 October, when she was decommissioned and placed back in reserve at Dänholm. While out of service, her copper sheathing was removed from her hull so ventilation holes could be cut into the outer planking. Her entire propulsion system, including the masts and the funnel, was removed and a roof was erected over the hull to keep the elements out.

=== Second Schleswig War ===
The ship remained out of service for the next few years. On 8 December 1863, the Prussian Navy ordered the fleet to mobilize, as tensions between Prussia and Denmark over the Schleswig–Holstein question rose sharply. Mobilization meant that Scorpion and the rest of the gunboats at Stralsund would have to be reconstructed. Scorpion returned to service on 11 February 1864 as the Prussian Navy mobilized after the start of the Second Schleswig War. She was assigned to the 1st Flotilla Division, which saw action at the Battle of Jasmund on 17 March. The Prussian gunboat divisions were assigned to guard the main Prussian ports on the Baltic coast, namely Stralsund, Stettin, and Swinemünde after the Royal Danish Navy imposed a blockade of the ports.

The flotilla was deployed to support Captain Eduard von Jachmann's corvettes as they attempted to break the Danish blockade, but the gunboats were only lightly engaged. Jachmann had ordered them to take up a position closer to land to cover a potential withdrawal, and so they were too far to take part in the main action. Nevertheless, as the Danish steam frigate Tordenskjold arrived to reinforce the main squadron, Scorpion and the other gunboats fired on her from afar. Tordenskjold's commander ignored the gunboats and continued south to join the fight with Jachmann's corvettes, firing only a few broadsides at the gunboats in passing, with neither side scoring any hits. As the Danes continued south in pursuit of Jachmann's ships, the gunboats withdrew back to Stralsund, though they had to take Hay under tow after her engines broke down. On 14 April, after a minor action off the island of Hiddensee, in which Scorpion did not take part, the Prussian gunboat flotilla was reduced to a reserve formation and took no further active part in the war. A ceasefire took effect on 20 July, which led to negotiations to end the war.

The combatants signed the Treaty of Vienna on 20 October, formally ending the war. The following day, Scorpion was decommissioned at Stralsund, though on 27 September 1865, she moved to Kiel (without having been placed in commission); she towed a pair of gun-armed shallops to Kiel during the voyage.

=== Later career ===
The ship next recommissioned in early 1866 as tensions between Prussia and the Austrian Empire rose prior to the outbreak of the Austro-Prussian War. Scorpion towed a pair of gun-armed dinghies to Friedrichsort outside Kiel. She later towed the corvettes Augusta and Victoria, which were still under construction, in Kiel's harbor so they could be fitted out. On 29 May, she embarked now-Konteradmiral (Rear Admiral) Jachmann for a trip from Kiel to Schleswig to meet Generalleutnant (Lieutenant General) Edwin Freiherr von Manteuffel, the Prussian governor and the commander of the Prussian army garrison there. The ship saw no action during the short war that began in June and ended in July, and she was placed back in reserve soon thereafter. The ship was recommissioned again on 21 February 1867 to serve as the tender for the naval command in Kiel. During this period, she was used to train engine room crews and for testing signals between ships and shore-based observers. In October, she was decommissioned for the winter. After recommissioning on 28 May 1868, she resumed engine room training on 20 June, which lasted until October, when she was again laid up for the winter. Scorpion next recommissioned on 3 May 1869, initially serving as a tender for the gunnery training ship Thetis, but this was interrupted from 30 August to 4 September by training exercises with several ironclad warships in the western Baltic. Leutnant zur See Otto Herbig commanded the ship from July to October that year. On 30 October, Scorpion was again laid up for the winter.

Scorpion was recommissioned for the last time on 22 July 1870 after the Prussian fleet again mobilized, this time for the Franco-Prussian War. She was assigned to the naval forces guarding the naval mine barrier guarding the approaches to Kiel at Friedrichsort, which were led by the paddle aviso Preussischer Adler. The unit, led by Konteradmiral (Rear Admiral) Eduard Heldt, also included the artillery training ship Renown and the gunboats Cyclop, Camäleon, Habicht, and Scorpion. Based in Stralsund were the gunboats Blitz and Fuchs, and at Danzig was the screw corvette Nymphe. In September, French warships left the Baltic, and Scorpion spent the rest of the war assisting merchant shipping in the area and preventing them from running into the minefield. In 1872, Scorpion underwent a refit that included replacing her main gun with a more modern, iron 15 cm (5.9 in) RK L/22 gun, and her boilers were replaced. Her sailing rig was removed and a simple pole mast was fitted for signaling purposes. She saw no further active service, however, and on 9 January 1877, she was struck from the naval register.

Otto von Diederichs, then a staff officer for the Torpedo-Versuchs-und-Prüfung Kommission (Torpedo Research and Development Commission), requested use of Scorpion for use as a torpedo test ship later that year. He had a single above-water torpedo tube installed in front of the ship's mainmast. Testing that year concluded with a demonstration on 18 September, held for General Albrecht von Stosch, the chief of the German Navy, and Reinhold von Werner, the commander of the Marinestation der Ostsee (Baltic Sea Naval Station). The demonstration began with the torpedo-aviso Zieten firing three torpedoes and concluded with Scorpion, with Diederichs in command, making a high-speed attack with several torpedoes. Scorpion was used as a mine storage barge for some time afterward, but her ultimate fate is unknown.
