= SMS Camäleon =

Gunboat of the Prussian and German Imperial Navy

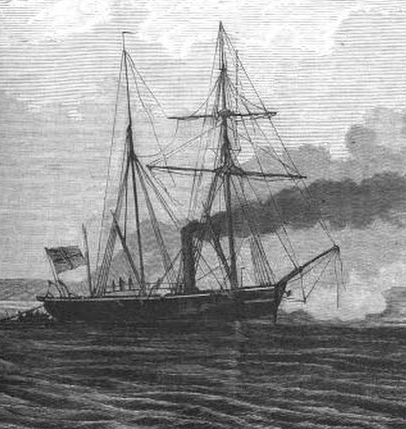
- Illustration of Camäleon's sister ship Meteor

History
- Name: Camäleon
- Operator: Prussian Navy; Imperial German Navy
- Builder: Königliche Werft, Danzig
- Laid down: September 1859
- Launched: 4 August 1860
- Commissioned: 6 August 1861
- Decommissioned: 1 April 1871
- Stricken: 19 March 1872
- Fate: Broken up

General characteristics
- Class & type: Camäleon-class gunboat
- Displacement: 422 t (415 long tons)
- Length: 43.28 m (142 ft)
- Beam: 6.96 m (22 ft 10 in)
- Draft: 2.67 m (8 ft 9 in)
- Installed power: 250 to 320 PS (250 to 320 ihp)
- Propulsion: 1 × marine steam engine
- Speed: 9.1 to 9.3 kn (16.9 to 17.2 km/h; 10.5 to 10.7 mph)
- Complement: 71
- Armament: 1 × 15 cm (5.9 in) gun; 2 × 12 cm (4.7 in) guns

SMS Camäleon was the lead ship of the Camäleon class of steam gunboats of the Prussian Navy (later the Imperial German Navy) that was launched in 1860. The ship was ordered as part of a program to strengthen Prussia's coastal defense forces, then oriented against neighboring Denmark. A small vessel, armed with a battery of only three light guns, Camäleon saw little active use. She served during the Second Schleswig War of 1864 and the Franco-Prussian War of 1870–1871, but saw no action in either conflict. Her peacetime career was limited to survey work in 1865 and limited tender duties in and around Kiel in 1867–1868. In poor condition by 1872, she was stricken from the naval register and used as a storage hulk in Kiel. She was broken up for scrap some time after 1878.

== Design ==
The Camäleon class came about as a result of a program to strengthen the Prussian Navy in the late 1850s in the aftermath of the dissolution of the Reichsflotte and in the midst of rising tensions with Denmark. In 1859, Prince Regent Wilhelm approved a construction program for some fifty-two steam gunboats to be built over the next fifteen years, of which eight became the Camäleon class. They were similar to the contemporaneous Jäger-class gunboats, but were substantially larger vessels. These ships were intended to defend the Prussian coast in the event of another war with Denmark.

Camäleon was 43.28 meters (142 ft) long, with a beam of 6.96 m (22 ft 10 in) and a draft of 2.67 m (8 ft 9 in). She displaced 422 metric tons (415 long tons) at full load. The ship's crew consisted of 4 officers and 67 enlisted men. She was powered by a single marine steam engine that drove one 3-bladed screw propeller, with steam provided by two coal-fired trunk boilers, which gave her a top speed of 9.1 knots (16.9 km/h; 10.5 mph) at 250 metric horsepower (250 ihp). As built, she was equipped with a three-masted schooner rig. The ship was armed with a battery of one rifled 15 cm (5.9 in) 24-pounder muzzle-loading gun and two rifled 12 cm (4.7 in) 12-pounder muzzle-loading guns.

== Service history ==
The keel for Camäleon was laid down in September 1859 at the Königliche Werft (Royal Shipyard) in Danzig, and she was officially named on 18 October. The ship was launched on 4 August 1860, the first member of her class. Since the initial sea trials that were conducted by the shipyard proved to be unsatisfactory, commissioning of the ship was delayed from the originally scheduled date of 23 June 1861 to 6 August. After entering service, she joined her sister ship Comet and the Jäger-class gunboats Fuchs, Jäger, Salamander, and Scorpion for a visit to Skagen in Denmark and the free imperial cities of Hamburg and Bremen. The tour was commanded by Korvettenkapitän (Corvette Captain) Hans Kuhn, who flew his flag in Camäleon. After the stop in Skagen, the corvette Amazone and the schooner Hela joined the flotilla of gunboats. While on their way back to Prussia in September, they stopped in Lübeck. After arriving back in Danzig, Camäleon was decommissioned. The ship had not been able to reach her designed speed on the cruise, so AG Vulcan had to make modifications to the engine at its own expense.

Camäleon remained laid up until the outbreak of the Second Schleswig War in February 1864, when she was mobilized into the coastal defense flotilla. She saw no action during the war, and in April was transferred to the Reserve Division, along with her sisters Comet, Cyclop, and Delphin. In August and September, Camäleon and much of the Prussian fleet visited the Baltic Sea ports of the conquered territories of Schleswig and Holstein; at the end of September, she began a survey of the Holstein coast that lasted into October. Camäleon was employed in the area of Hörup Haff and Alsen. At the end of March 1865, the Reserve Division was dissolved. Camäleon was sent to assist the corvette Victoria, which had run aground in the Fehmarn Belt, but Camäleon herself ran aground off Friedrichsort while en route. After being pulled free, she was transferred to the Jade Bay to conduct survey work with Comet and the aviso Loreley. In September, Camäleon was assigned to the gunnery school along with the old frigate Gefion. Camäleon served in the gunnery school briefly, before being decommissioned at Dänholm on 1 December. At some point in 1865, the boat's 24-pounder was replaced with a rifled 21 cm (8.3 in) 68-pounder gun.

The ship remained out of service during the Austro-Prussian War of 1866, and next saw active duty in 1867, when she was recommissioned on 12 March for service as a tender in Kiel. On 15 October, she retrieved the main anchor from the corvette Augusta, which had been lost during an emergency anchoring. Camäleon remained in Kiel through 1868. During this period, she towed the steamer Greif and carried a 75-pounder gun to the coastal fortification on Friedrichsort on 30 March. On 16 April and 25 May, Prince Adalbert of Prussia came aboard to visit the ship. She carried Prince Friedrich Karl of Prussia to Sonderburg on 15–16 June. A boiler explosion that destroyed one of her boilers forced her decommissioning on 26 August for repairs. She remained laid up until the outbreak of the Franco-Prussian War in July 1870. She was stationed as a guard ship off Friedrichsort for the duration of the conflict. On 1 April 1871, with the war all but over, Camäleon was decommissioned again. She was stricken from the naval register on 19 March 1872, owing to her poor condition. The ship was used as a harbor vessel in Kiel, and later converted into a coal storage hulk. While in Kiel, parts of the ship were removed for use in the reconstruction of her sister Cyclop. Camäleon was broken up for scrap some time after 1878, but the exact date is not known.
