= SMS Basilisk (1862) =

Gunboat of the Prussian and German Imperial Navy

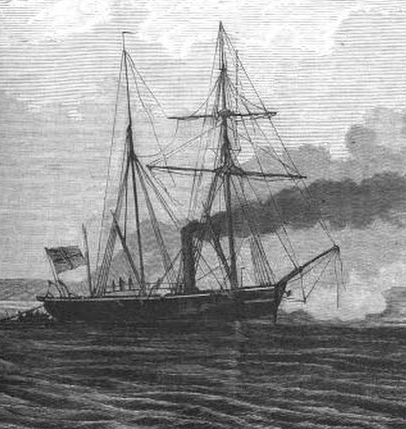
- Illustration of Basilisk's sister ship Meteor

History
- Name: Basilisk
- Operator: Prussian Navy; Imperial German Navy
- Builder: Königliche Werft, Danzig
- Laid down: 26 July 1861
- Launched: 20 August 1862
- Stricken: 28 December 1875
- Fate: Hulked, 1875; Broken up sometime after 1900

General characteristics
- Class & type: Camäleon-class gunboat
- Displacement: 422 t (415 long tons)
- Length: 43.28 m (142 ft)
- Beam: 6.96 m (22 ft 10 in)
- Draft: 2.67 m (8 ft 9 in)
- Installed power: 250 to 320 PS (250 to 320 ihp)
- Propulsion: 1 × marine steam engine
- Speed: 9.1 to 9.3 kn (16.9 to 17.2 km/h; 10.5 to 10.7 mph)
- Complement: 71
- Armament: 1 × 15 cm (5.9 in) gun; 2 × 12 cm (4.7 in) guns

SMS Basilisk was a Camäleon-class steam gunboat of the Prussian Navy (later the Imperial German Navy) that was launched in 1862. The ship was ordered as part of a program to strengthen Prussia's coastal defense forces, then oriented against neighboring Denmark. A small vessel, armed with a battery of only three light guns, Basilisk served during all three wars of German unification in the 1860s and early 1870s. The ship was present during the Battle of Heligoland in May 1864 during the Second Schleswig War, but was too slow to engage the Danish squadron. During the Austro-Prussian War of 1866 and the Franco-Prussian War of 1870–1871, Basilisk was stationed in the North Sea to help defend the coast, but she did not see action during either conflict. Between 1873 and 1875, she was employed experimentally as the first torpedo-armed warship of the German fleet. Basilisk was decommissioned in 1875, renamed "Mine Barge No. 1", and converted into a naval mine storage hulk. The details of her fate are unrecorded, but she was still in service in that capacity at least as late as 1900. Sometime thereafter, she was broken up.

== Design ==
The Camäleon class came about as a result of a program to strengthen the Prussian Navy in the late 1850s in the aftermath of the dissolution of the Reichsflotte and in the midst of rising tensions with Denmark. In 1859, Prince Regent Wilhelm approved a construction program for some fifty-two steam gunboats to be built over the next fifteen years, of which eight became the Camäleon class. They were similar to the contemporaneous Jäger-class gunboats, but were substantially larger vessels. These ships were intended to defend the Prussian coast in the event of another war with Denmark.

Basilisk was 43.28 meters (142 ft) long, with a beam of 6.96 m (22 ft 10 in) and a draft of 2.67 m (8 ft 9 in). She displaced 422 metric tons (415 long tons) at full load. The ship's crew consisted of 4 officers and 67 enlisted men. She was powered by a single marine steam engine that drove one 3-bladed screw propeller, with steam provided by two coal-fired trunk boilers, which gave her a top speed of 9.3 knots (17.2 km/h; 10.7 mph) at 320 metric horsepower (320 ihp). As built, she was equipped with a three-masted schooner rig. The ship was armed with a battery of one rifled 15 cm (5.9 in) 24-pounder gun and two rifled 12 cm (4.7 in) 12-pounder guns, all three of which were muzzleloaders.

== Service history ==
The keel for Basilisk was laid down at the Königliche Werft (Royal Dockyard) in Danzig on 26 July 1861. She was launched on 20 August 1862. After work finished, Basilisk was taken to the island of Dänholm off Stralsund, where she was disarmed and laid up in storage. The navy initially intended to send Basilisk to East Asian waters, but the Camäleon-class gunboats were too small for such an extended overseas deployment. Instead, she was commissioned on 28 May 1863 for a deployment to the Mediterranean Sea, where she joined her sister ship Blitz and the aviso Preussischer Adler; the ships were commanded by Korvettenkapitän (Corvette Captain) Gustav Klatt. Upon arrival, the three ships protected German nationals in Greece, which was experiencing a period of civil unrest. Later that year, the vessels entered the Black Sea; under the terms of the Treaty of Paris that had ended the Crimean War in 1856, Prussia was permitted to station warships in Sulina at the mouth of the Danube to enforce the peace. Basilisk and Blitz had their 15 cm gun removed during the trip to prevent damage in heavy weather. On 18 August 1863, the vessels left the Black Sea and returned to Piraeus, Greece, arriving on 9 October. There, on 3 December, they received the order to return to Prussia, as conflict with Denmark over the latter's November Constitution, which integrated the duchies of Schleswig, Holstein, and Lauenburg with Denmark, a violation of the London Protocol that had ended the First Schleswig War.

=== Second Schleswig War ===
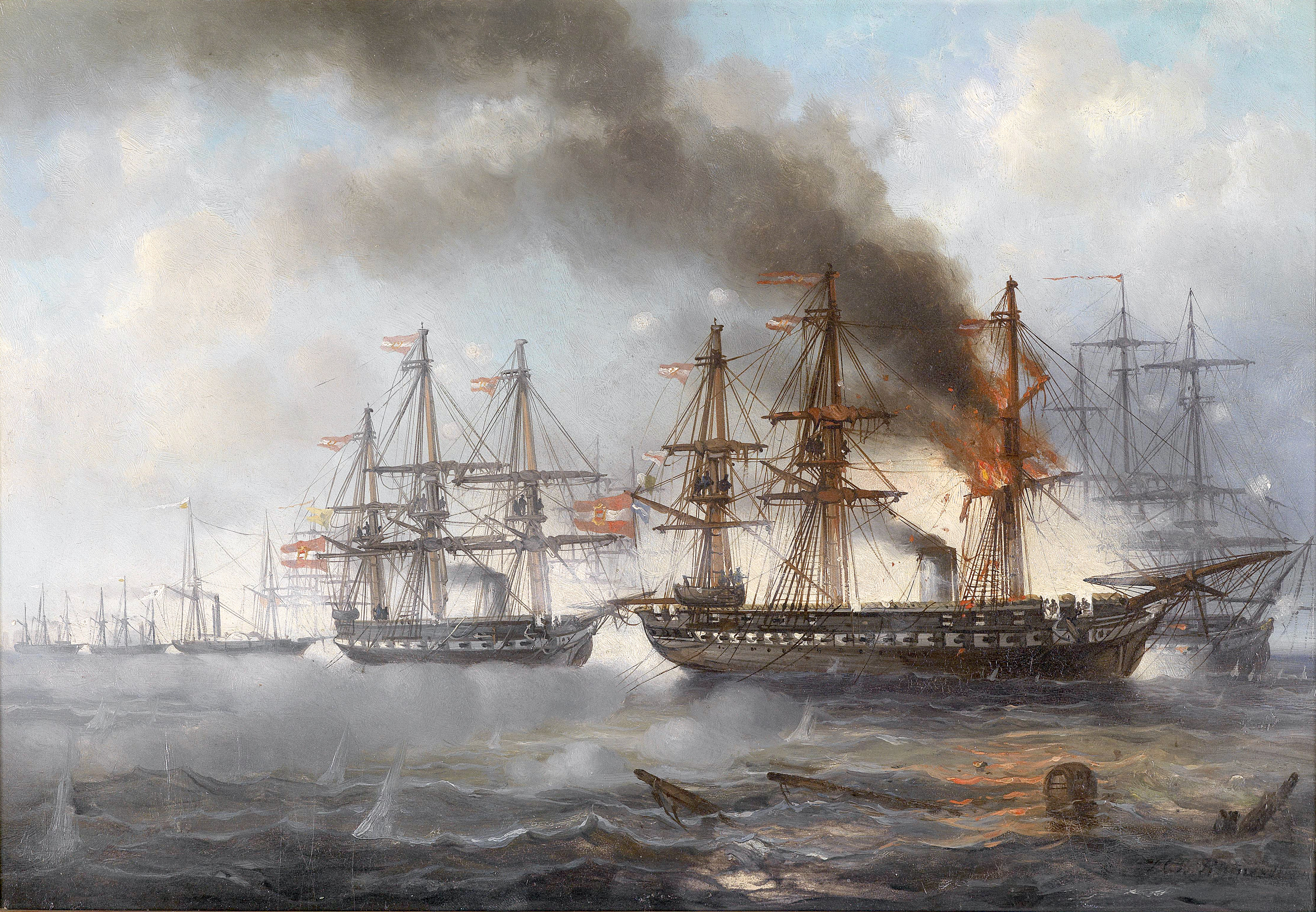
The Battle of Heligoland by Josef Carl Berthold Püttner; Basilisk and the other Prussian vessels are visible in the left background

The crisis between Denmark and the German Confederation erupted in the Second Schleswig War, which began on 1 February 1864, after the Prussian and Austrian Empires delivered an ultimatum to Denmark to cede the disputed duchies to Austro-Prussian control. At the time, the Danish fleet was far superior to the Prussian naval forces initially available, which allowed the Danes to blockade the German coast. To assist the Prussians, the Austrian Navy sent Kommodore (Commodore) Wilhelm von Tegetthoff with the screw frigates Schwarzenberg and Radetzky to break the Danish blockade. The Austrian and Prussian squadrons rendezvoused in Texel, the Netherlands, and Basilisk and the other Prussian vessels came under Tegetthoff's command. On 4 May, the combined squadron arrived in Cuxhaven, then an enclave of the free city of Hamburg, at the mouth of the Elbe river.

On the morning of 9 May, Tegetthoff learned that a Danish squadron consisting of the steam frigates Niels Juel and Jylland and the corvette Hejmdal were patrolling off the island of Heligoland. Tegetthoff took the five ships under his command out to attack the Danish vessels, resulting in the Battle of Heligoland. Basilisk and the other Prussian ships were too slow to keep pace with Schwarzenberg and Radetzky. After Schwarzenberg caught fire, Tegetthoff broke off the action and escaped to the neutral waters around Heligoland, where the ships remained until early the next day. During the period off Heligoland, the Prussian vessels sent their doctors to the Austrian frigates to help tend to their wounded. The next morning, the ships returned to Cuxhaven. Though the Danish squadron had won a tactical victory at Heligoland, the arrival of Austrian warships in the North Sea forced the Danes to withdraw their blockade.

In June, a second Austrian squadron arrived, which included the ship of the line Kaiser and the armored frigate Don Juan d'Austria; the now outnumbered Danish fleet remained in port for the rest of the war and did not seek battle with the Austro-Prussian squadron. For the next month, Basilisk and the rest of the Austro-Prussian squadron patrolled the North Sea, taking Danish prizes. On 19 July, Basilisk, Blitz, and three Austrian gunboats supported landing operations conducted with two companies from the Austrian Kaiserjäger-Regiment in the North Frisian Islands. The operations were covered by the heavy units of the Austrian fleet, though the Danish fleet did not venture out to oppose the landing. This was the last offensive operation in which Basilisk participated before the end of the war in October. For the remainder of the conflict, she remained in Cuxhaven guarding the prizes that had been taken.

=== Later career ===
On 9 December 1864, Basilisk returned to Dänholm, where she was decommissioned for a boiler overhaul. In 1865, the boat's 24-pounder was replaced with a rifled 21 cm (8.3 in) 68-pounder gun. At the start of the Austro-Prussian War in June 1866, Basilisk was mobilized for wartime service. She was transferred to Danzig by a shipyard crew, received her crew, and joined a squadron stationed in the North Sea. The Austrian fleet was unable to leave the Adriatic Sea, owing to Prussia's alliance with Italy, and so Basilisk did not see action during the conflict. From 1867 to 1868, she took part in a new survey of the German coast in the North Sea; this duty lasted from 26 October 1867 to 21 April 1868, and was conducted in company with the aviso Loreley and the gunboat Wolf. In May, she conducted a survey of the harbor at Tönning and the waters around Heligoland. On 6 November, Basilisk was decommissioned for a second time, this time in Geestemünde.

On 17 July 1870, Basilisk was recommissioned, two days before the start of the Franco-Prussian War. She was stationed in the Jade Bight to defend the naval base at Wilhelmshaven, though the French did not launch an attack during the war. The boat was decommissioned in 1871 after the war ended, and she remained out of service for the next three years. During this period, in 1873, Basilisk received a single 38.1 cm (15 in) torpedo tube in a deck-mounted launcher, for use as an experimental torpedo gunboat. She was the first vessel of the German navy to be armed with self-propelled torpedoes; the first tests were conducted from 24 March to 16 May 1874 in the Wilhelmshaven roadstead. This service lasted just two years, before she was stricken from the naval register on 28 December 1875. She was then renamed "Mine Barge No. 1", and used as a storage hulk for naval mines as part of the harbor defenses of Wilhelmshaven until at least 1900, the last recorded date she was still in service. The date of her sale and when she was broken up have not been recorded. Her engine was retained for use in one of the Wolf-class gunboats, built in the late 1870s.
