= SMS Drache (1865) =

Gunboat of the Prussian and German Imperial Navy

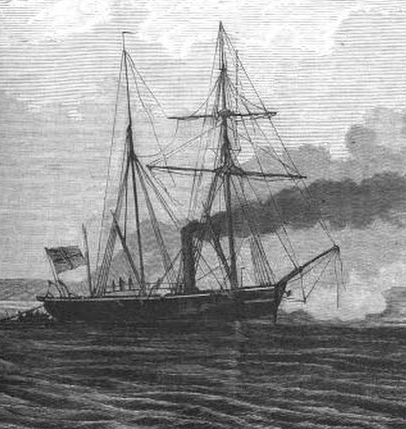
- Illustration of Drache's sister ship Meteor

History
- Name: Drache
- Operator: Prussian Navy; Imperial German Navy
- Builder: Königliche Werft, Danzig
- Laid down: 27 July 1861
- Launched: 3 August 1865
- Commissioned: July 1870
- Decommissioned: 30 September 1887
- Stricken: 13 December 1887
- Fate: Sunk in torpedo tests, 1889

General characteristics
- Class & type: Camäleon-class gunboat
- Displacement: 422 t (415 long tons)
- Length: 43.28 m (142 ft)
- Beam: 6.96 m (22 ft 10 in)
- Draft: 2.67 m (8 ft 9 in)
- Installed power: 250 to 320 PS (250 to 320 ihp)
- Propulsion: 1 × marine steam engine
- Speed: 9.1 to 9.3 kn (16.9 to 17.2 km/h; 10.5 to 10.7 mph)
- Complement: 71
- Armament: 1 × 15 cm (5.9 in) gun; 2 × 12 cm (4.7 in) guns

SMS Drache was a Camäleon-class steam gunboat of the Prussian Navy (later the Imperial German Navy) that was launched in 1860. Drache was a small vessel, armed with a battery of only three guns. The ship was ordered as part of a program to strengthen Prussia's coastal defense forces, then oriented against neighboring Denmark. Budgetary problems delayed her completion until 1869, and she first entered service during the Franco-Prussian War in 1870, though she saw no significant action against the French Navy. Drache spent most of her career, between 1872 and 1887, conducting survey work in the North Sea, which later proved to be instrumental to the operations of German U-boats and minelayers during World War I. Drache was ultimately decommissioned in 1887, reduced to a coal hulk, and then expended as a target for the torpedo boat D5 in 1889. Her wreck was later raised and broken up.

== Design ==
The Camäleon class came about as a result of a program to strengthen the Prussian Navy in the late 1850s in the aftermath of the dissolution of the Reichsflotte and in the midst of rising tensions with Denmark. In 1859, Prince Regent Wilhelm approved a construction program for some fifty-two steam gunboats to be built over the next fifteen years, of which eight became the Camäleon class. They were similar to the contemporaneous Jäger-class gunboats, but were substantially larger vessels. These ships were intended to defend the Prussian coast in the event of another war with Denmark.

Drache was 43.28 meters (142 ft) long, with a beam of 6.96 m (22 ft 10 in) and a draft of 2.67 m (8 ft 9 in). She displaced 422 metric tons (415 long tons) at full load. The ship's crew consisted of 4 officers and 67 enlisted men. She was powered by a single marine steam engine that drove one 3-bladed screw propeller, with steam provided by two coal-fired trunk boilers, which gave her a top speed of 9.1 knots (16.9 km/h; 10.5 mph) at 320 metric horsepower (320 ihp). As built, she was equipped with a three-masted schooner rig. The ship was armed with a battery of one rifled 21 cm (8.3 in) 68-pounder gun and two rifled 12 cm (4.7 in) 12-pounder guns.

== Service history ==
Drache was laid down at the Königliche Werft (Royal Dockyard) in Danzig on 27 July 1861; she was not launched until 3 August 1865, owing to constitutional disputes over the budget, which delayed construction of the gunboat. The Prussian Landtag (State Diet) tried to block the military expansion program advocated by Albrecht von Roon, the Prussian Ministry of War, leading to a constitutional crisis where the army and navy operated without legal budgets. The Navy was thus unable to spare funding to complete Drache and her sister Meteor. Drache's completion was similarly delayed by budgetary problems, and she was finally delivered to the navy at its base at Dänholm off Stralsund in late April 1869.

The vessel was first commissioned for service in mid-July 1870, following the outbreak of the Franco-Prussian War earlier that month. She was assigned to a gunboat flotilla commanded by KK Franz von Waldersee, along with the aviso Grille and the gunboats Salamander and Blitz. On 12 August, Waldersee took his four vessels the island of to Rügen, where they briefly engaged blockading French vessels before returning to port. On 10 September, the unit was disbanded, and Drache was sent to Rügen. In December, she was transferred to the North Sea, based in Wilhelmshaven; heavy ice forced her to winter in Friedrichstadt. In February 1871, she and Blitz steamed to Tönning; there, they towed several cannon-armed shallops back to Wilhelmshaven. With the war all but over, Drache was decommissioned in Wilhelmshaven on 6 April.

On 6 May 1872, Drache was recommissioned for service as a survey vessel, having had her 21 cm gun removed and a deck house erected in its place. From May until 22 October, she surveyed the eastern coast of Holstein, operating from her base in Kiel. In November, Drache, Meteor, and the transport ship Rhein searched the eastern Baltic for any merchant ships that might have been damaged in a heavy storm. On 12 December, Drache returned to Wilhelmshaven, where she was again decommissioned. On 15 April 1874, the vessel was recommissioned for visits to British and Norwegian ports before being decommissioned again on 23 November in Wilhelmshaven. It was planned to send her to Spain in response to attacks on German nationals there, but the plan came to nothing. From 1875 to 1880, Drache made visits to Britain and Norway in the summer months. During this period, she underwent several additional modifications. In 1876, her masts were removed to improve her stability, and her remaining two guns were removed in 1878. Over the winter of 1879–1880, new boilers were installed, along with a barquentine sailing rig.

Starting in 1881, Drache return to surveying duties in the North Sea; this work took her as far north as the 60th parallel in 1882. The year 1883 saw similar service, along with fishery protection operations in the North Sea; this had become increasingly important due to the rising number of foreign boats illegally fishing in German waters. On 15 October 1883, Drache was once again decommissioned for the winter. She returned to service for more survey work in mid-1884 in the Skagerrak and the coast of Norway. She continued surveying areas of the North Sea through the first half of 1887, before being decommissioned the last time on 30 September. The oceanographic data Drache had gathered over the previous fifteen proved to be indispensable to German U-boat crews and mining operations during World War I. On 13 December, Drache was stricken from the naval register and hulked in Wilhelmshaven. She was towed through the Eider Canal in 1888 and was sunk by the torpedo boat D5 in a demonstration for Vizeadmiral (Vice Admiral) Max von der Goltz. The wreck was thereafter raised and broken up.
