= Camäleon-class gunboat =

Gunboat class of the Prussian and German Imperial Navy

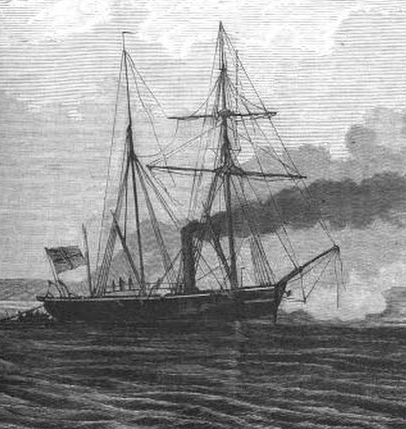
- Illustration of Meteor

Class overview
- Preceded by: Jäger class
- Succeeded by: Albatross class
- Built: 1860–1869
- In commission: 1861–1887
- Completed: 8
- Scrapped: 8

General characteristics
- Type: Gunboat
- Displacement: 422 t (415 long tons)
- Length: 43.28 m (142 ft)
- Beam: 6.96 m (22 ft 10 in)
- Draft: 2.67 m (8 ft 9 in)
- Installed power: 250 to 320 PS (250 to 320 ihp)
- Propulsion: 1 × marine steam engine
- Speed: 9.1 to 9.3 kn (16.9 to 17.2 km/h; 10.5 to 10.7 mph)
- Complement: 71
- Armament: 1 × 15 cm (5.9 in) gun; 2 × 12 cm (4.7 in) guns

The Camäleon class was a group of steam gunboats built for the Prussian Navy. Eight ships comprised the class: Camäleon, Comet, Cyclop, Delphin, Blitz, Basilisk, Meteor, and Drache. The vessels were armed with a battery of one 15 cm (5.9 in) gun and two 12 cm (4.7 in) guns. In 1865, the ships then in service had their 15 cm gun replaced with a 21 cm (8.3 in) gun; Meteor and Drache, not yet completed, entered service with that gun. The vessels saw action during the wars of German unification, with Comet taking part in the Battle of Jasmund and Blitz and Basilisk present during the Battle of Heligoland, both during the Second Schleswig War in 1864. Several of the ships served in the North Sea during the Austro-Prussian War, where some of them supported operations against the Kingdom of Hanover. During the Franco-Prussian War, Meteor battled the French aviso Bouvet in the Battle of Havana in 1870; the other members of the class were deployed on coastal defense assignments.

During their peacetime careers, the vessels served in a variety of roles, including as survey vessels, training ships, fishery protection ships, and guard ships. Several of them were sent abroad, usually to the Mediterranean Sea on training cruises; during conflicts in Spain and the Ottoman Empire, these vessels were used to protect German nationals in those countries. Starting in 1872, the members of the class began to be withdrawn from service as their hulls began to deteriorate. Several of the ships were converted into storage hulks, while others were simply broken up or in the case of Meteor and Drache, sunk as target ships. Basilisk was the last surviving member of the class, remaining in use as a naval mine storage hulk until at least 1900; her ultimate fate is unknown.

== Background and design ==
Following the dissolution of the Reichsflotte in 1852, the leaders of the Prussian Navy sought resources to expand its forces to defend Prussia's coastline, which was extended in 1853 with the acquisition of the area that would become the port of Wilhelmshaven. In 1855, King Wilhelm IV signed what became known as the Fleet Foundation Plan of 1855, which authorized a total force of 42 sail- and oar-powered gunboats. By 1859, increasing tensions with neighboring Denmark led the Prussian parliament to demand a more powerful force, and the navy responded with a larger program that included a total of 52 steam-powered gunboats to be built between 1860 and 1875. In June 1859, Prince Regent Wilhelm approved the construction of the first twenty of these vessels. The Landtag authorized funds for these vessels that year.

Meanwhile, Chief Constructor Carl Elbertzhagen had already begun collecting information on steam gunboats being built in Britain, France, Russia, and Brazil, to determine what characteristics the new Prussian vessels should have. Elbertzhagen prepared two gunboat designs: a smaller vessel, which became the Jäger class, and a substantially larger version that became the Camäleon class. All were to be built domestically, and of the first twenty vessels to be built, fifteen were to be of the Jäger type and four were to be Camäleon-class gunboats. (Note: Nottelmann does not account for the twentieth vessel authorized.) The Prussian Navy had determined that larger gunboats with more powerful engines would be more versatile for peacetime use; members of the Prussian House of Representatives suggested the vessels could be used for commercial voyages. In 1860, the Landtag approved another four vessels of the class. These were also to be built in Prussia, but by that time, the navy had found the domestically built engines to be unsatisfactory, so the latter group of gunboats received machinery imported from Britain.

=== Characteristics ===
The ships of the Camäleon class were 43.28 meters (142 ft) long, with a beam of 6.96 m (22 ft 10 in) and a draft of 2.67 m (8 ft 9 in). They displaced 422 metric tons (415 long tons) at full load. Each vessel had a carvel hull built from oak that was sheathed with a layer of copper to protect it from corrosion and biofouling. Steering was controlled via a single rudder. The Camäleon-class gunboats handled poorly and rolled severely. The ships' crew consisted of 4 officers and 67 enlisted men. Each gunboat carried a pair of small boats.

They were powered by a single marine steam engine that drove one 3-bladed screw propeller and two coal-fired trunk boilers. The first four vessels received machinery from AG Vulcan, while the last four were equipped with engines and boilers built by Schichau-Werke. The first four ships had a top speed of 9.1 knots (16.9 km/h; 10.5 mph) at 250 metric horsepower (250 ihp), while the last four were slightly faster, at 9.3 kn (17.2 km/h; 10.7 mph) from 320 PS (320 ihp). The ships had a designed storage capacity for 27 t (27 long tons) of coal for the boilers, but additional spaces could be used to store up to 52 t (51 long tons). As built, each ship was equipped with a three-masted schooner rig; several of the class members had their rigging altered during their career, including Delphin, which received a barquentine rig and Cyclop, which was converted into a barque rig.

Each ship was armed with a battery of one rifled 15 cm (5.9 in) 24-pounder muzzle-loading gun and two rifled 12 cm (4.7 in) 12-pounder muzzle-loading guns. In 1865, the ships had their 15 cm gun replaced with a rifled 21 cm (8.3 in) 68-pounder muzzle-loader; Meteor and Drache, not yet completed in 1865, never received the original gun.

== Ships ==
Construction data
| Ship | Builder | Laid down | Launched | Completed |
|---|---|---|---|---|
| Camäleon | Königliche Werft, Danzig | September 1859 | 4 August 1860 | 6 August 1861 |
| Comet | Königliche Werft, Danzig | 1 September 1859 | 1 September 1860 | 1861 |
| Cyclop | Königliche Werft, Danzig | 1859 | 8 September 1860 | 1861 |
| Delphin | Königliche Werft, Danzig | 8 September 1859 | 15 September 1860 | September 1861 |
| Blitz | Königliche Werft, Danzig | 26 July 1861 | 27 August 1862 | 1863 |
| Basilisk | Königliche Werft, Danzig | 26 July 1861 | 20 August 1862 | c. 1862–1863 |
| Meteor | Königliche Werft, Danzig | 27 June 1861 | 17 May 1865 | 6 September 1869 |
| Drache | Königliche Werft, Danzig | 27 July 1861 | 3 August 1865 | April 1869 |

== Service history ==
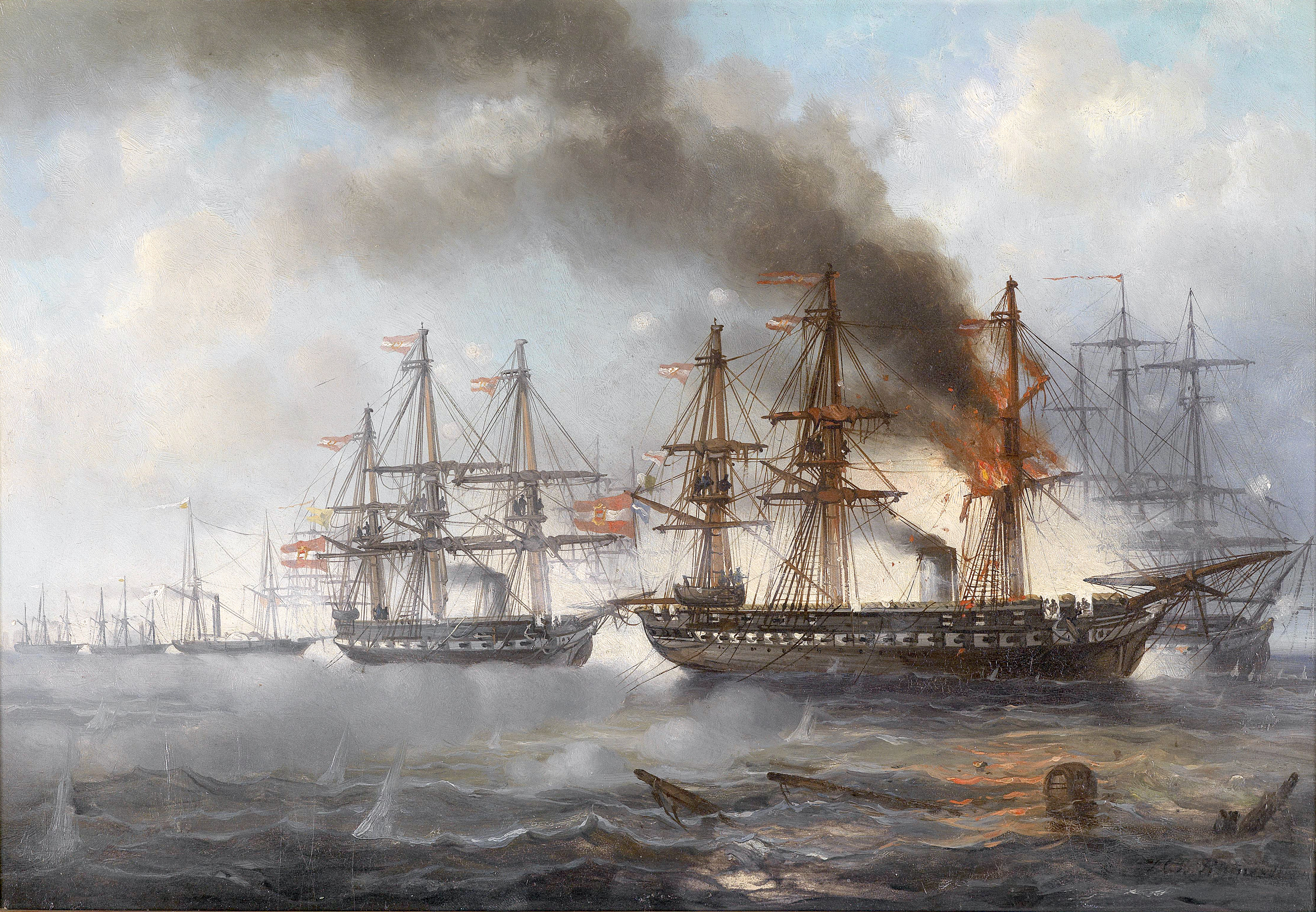
The Battle of Heligoland by Josef Carl Berthold Püttner; Blitz, Basilisk, and the Prussian aviso Preussischer Adler are visible in the left background

The ships of the Camäleon class were frequently laid up during peacetime, as tight Prussian naval budgets in the 1860s prevented an active fleet policy. This was in large part due to liberal opposition to an expansion and modernization program for the Prussian Army under Albrecht von Roon, the Prussian Ministry of War; the Prussian Landtag refused to pass a budget authorizing the expenses requested by Roon, leading to a constitutional crisis where the army and navy operated without legal budgets. The navy was thus unable to spare funding to operate smaller vessels like the Camäleon class. Indeed, the lack of funds delayed completion of Meteor and Drache considerably. During periods of inactivity, the ships were moved ashore, their copper plating was removed, and ventilation holes were cut into the hulls to prevent deterioration of the wood. The first four ships were laid up after completion, with budgetary shortages preventing Cyclop from even conducting sea trials.

All four were commissioned in late 1863 or early 1864 as Prussia and its ally Austria prepared for the Second Schleswig War against Denmark, which began in February 1864. During the war, the four gunboats were assigned to coastal defense duties in the Baltic Sea, and Comet saw action at the Battle of Jasmund in March 1864, where she traded ineffectual fire with a Danish screw frigate at long range. The fifth and sixth members of the class, Blitz and Basilisk, had been sent to the Mediterranean Sea on a training cruise and had to be recalled at the start of the war. They joined an Austrian squadron with the screw frigates Schwarzenberg and Radetzky under Kommodore (Commodore) Wilhelm von Tegetthoff. The Austro-Prussian force attacked the Danish squadron blockading the North Sea coast of the German states in the inconclusive Battle of Heligoland, though Blitz and Basilisk were too slow to take an active role in the engagement. After the war, the ships were kept in service, mostly to conduct surveys of the coastlines of Schleswig and Holstein, duchies that had been seized by Austria and Prussia during the war.

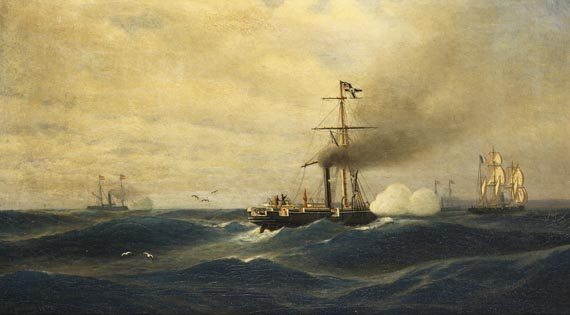
Painting of Meteor in battle with Bouvet

Throughout the 1860s, the members of the class served in a variety of roles, including fishery protection vessels, as guard ships, and as training ships on cruises to the Mediterranean. During the Austro-Prussian War of 1866, the completed members of the class served in the Baltic and North Seas, or in the case of Camäleon and Comet, were not activated at all. The ships in service did not see significant action, since the Austrian fleet was contained in the Adriatic Sea by Prussia's ally Italy. Cyclop, Delphin, Blitz, and the ironclad turret ship Arminius supported the Prussian Army's campaign against the Kingdom of Hanover. In 1869, the last two members of the class, Meteor and Drache, were finally completed. At the outbreak of the Franco-Prussian War in 1870, the ships of the class were again activated for coastal defense duties, either in the mouth of the Elbe or the Jade Bay in the North Sea or at the main Prussian naval base at Kiel in the Baltic. Meteor was abroad on a training cruise in the Caribbean Sea, and encountered the French aviso Bouvet in the Battle of Havana. In the action, Bouvet rammed and dismasted Meteor, but in turn had her engine disabled by a shell from Meteor. A Spanish corvette intervened to prevent Meteor from pursuing Bouvet after the French vessel broke off the engagement.

After the war, Camäleon and Cyclop were stricken from the naval register owing to their deteriorated condition and were broken up. Throughout the 1870s, the remaining members of the class performed a variety of tasks, including conducting cartographic surveys, weapons testing with new self-propelled torpedoes, and fishery protection duties. In 1873, Delphin was sent to Spain to protect German nationals during the Third Carlist War. Basilisk was hulked in 1875 and used to store naval mines until at least 1900. Blitz was also reduced to a hulk in 1876 but was scrapped two years later. Meteor and Comet were stationed in the Mediterranean during the Russo-Turkish War of 1877 to protect Germans in the Ottoman Empire. Later that year, Meteor returned to Germany and was sunk as a target ship. Comet and Delphin were discarded in 1881; the former was hulked in 1881 and broken up some time after 1891, while Delphin was simply scrapped after being stricken. Drache was the last surviving member of the class in service, conducting survey work until September 1887, when she too was stricken from the register and sunk as a target ship.
