= SMS Blitz (1862) =

Gunboat of the Prussian and German Imperial Navy

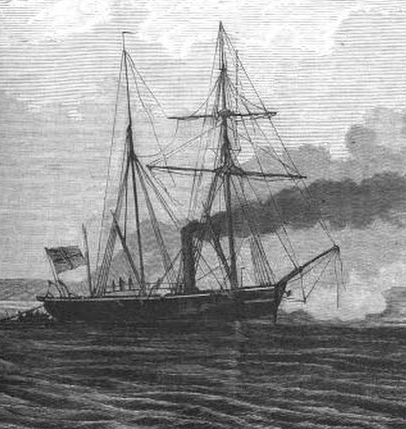
- Illustration of Blitz's sister ship Meteor

History
- Name: Blitz
- Operator: Prussian Navy; Imperial German Navy
- Builder: Königliche Werft, Danzig
- Laid down: 26 July 1861
- Launched: 27 August 1862
- Decommissioned: October 1875
- Stricken: 28 December 1876
- Fate: Broken up, 1878

General characteristics
- Class & type: Camäleon-class gunboat
- Displacement: 422 t (415 long tons)
- Length: 43.28 m (142 ft)
- Beam: 6.96 m (22 ft 10 in)
- Draft: 2.67 m (8 ft 9 in)
- Installed power: 250 to 320 PS (250 to 320 ihp)
- Propulsion: 1 × marine steam engine
- Speed: 9.1 to 9.3 kn (16.9 to 17.2 km/h; 10.5 to 10.7 mph)
- Complement: 71
- Armament: 1 × 15 cm (5.9 in) gun; 2 × 12 cm (4.7 in) guns

SMS Blitz was a Camäleon-class steam gunboat of the Prussian Navy (later the Imperial German Navy) that was launched in 1862. The ship was ordered as part of a program to strengthen Prussia's coastal defense forces, then oriented against neighboring Denmark. A small vessel, armed with a battery of only three light guns, Blitz served during all three wars of German unification in the 1860s and early 1870s. The ship was present during the Battle of Heligoland in May 1864 during the Second Schleswig War, but was too slow to engage the Danish squadron. During the Austro-Prussian War of 1866, she operated against the Kingdom of Hanover in the North Sea, but did not see extensive action. In August 1870, Blitz and three other light vessels attacked the French blockade force in the Baltic Sea during the Franco-Prussian War, but they withdrew without either side scoring any hits. During her peacetime career, Blitz was sent to the Mediterranean Sea twice, in 1863 and 1867–1868. She was employed as a fisheries protection ship, a guard ship, and a survey vessel in the early 1870s, before being decommissioned in 1875 and broken up for scrap in 1878. Parts of her machinery were reused in the gunboat Wolf.

== Design ==
The Camäleon class came about as a result of a program to strengthen the Prussian Navy in the late 1850s in the aftermath of the dissolution of the Reichsflotte and in the midst of rising tensions with Denmark. In 1859, Prince Regent Wilhelm approved a construction program for some fifty-two steam gunboats to be built over the next fifteen years, of which eight became the Camäleon class. They were similar to the contemporaneous Jäger-class gunboats, but were substantially larger vessels. These ships were intended to defend the Prussian coast in the event of another war with Denmark.

Blitz was 43.28 meters (142 ft) long, with a beam of 6.96 m (22 ft 10 in) and a draft of 2.67 m (8 ft 9 in). She displaced 422 metric tons (415 long tons) at full load. The ship's crew consisted of 4 officers and 67 enlisted men. She was powered by a pair of marine steam engine that each drove one 3-bladed screw propeller, with steam provided by two coal-fired trunk boilers, which gave her a top speed of 9.3 knots (17.2 km/h; 10.7 mph) at 320 metric horsepower (320 ihp). As built, she was equipped with a three-masted schooner rig. The ship was armed with a battery of one rifled 15 cm (5.9 in) 24-pounder gun and two rifled 12 cm (4.7 in) 12-pounder guns, all three of which were muzzleloaders.

== Service history ==
Blitz was laid down at the Königliche Werft (Royal Dockyard) in Danzig on 26 July 1861; her name was already assigned on 23 May, two months before work began. She was launched on 27 August 1862. On 22 May 1863, Blitz was ordered to deploy to the Mediterranean Sea along with her sister ship Basilisk and the aviso Preussischer Adler. Blitz began sea trials five days later, and on 13 June the gunboat was formally commissioned into service for her tour abroad. On 18 August, the three vessels departed Prussia, bound for Greek waters. Blitz's first commander was then Leutnant zur See (Lieutenant at Sea) Archibald MacLean. Upon arrival, the three ships protected German nationals in Greece, which was experiencing a period of civil unrest. Later that year, the vessels entered the Black Sea; under the terms of the Treaty of Paris that had ended the Crimean War in 1856, Prussia was permitted to station warships in Sulina at the mouth of the Danube to enforce the peace. Basilisk and Blitz had their 15 cm gun removed during the trip to prevent damage in heavy weather. On 18 August 1863, the vessels left the Black Sea and returned to Piraeus, Greece, arriving on 9 October. There, on 3 December, they received the order to return to Prussia, as conflict with Denmark over the latter's November Constitution, which integrated the duchies of Schleswig, Holstein, and Lauenburg with Denmark, a violation of the London Protocol that had ended the First Schleswig War.

=== Second Schleswig War ===
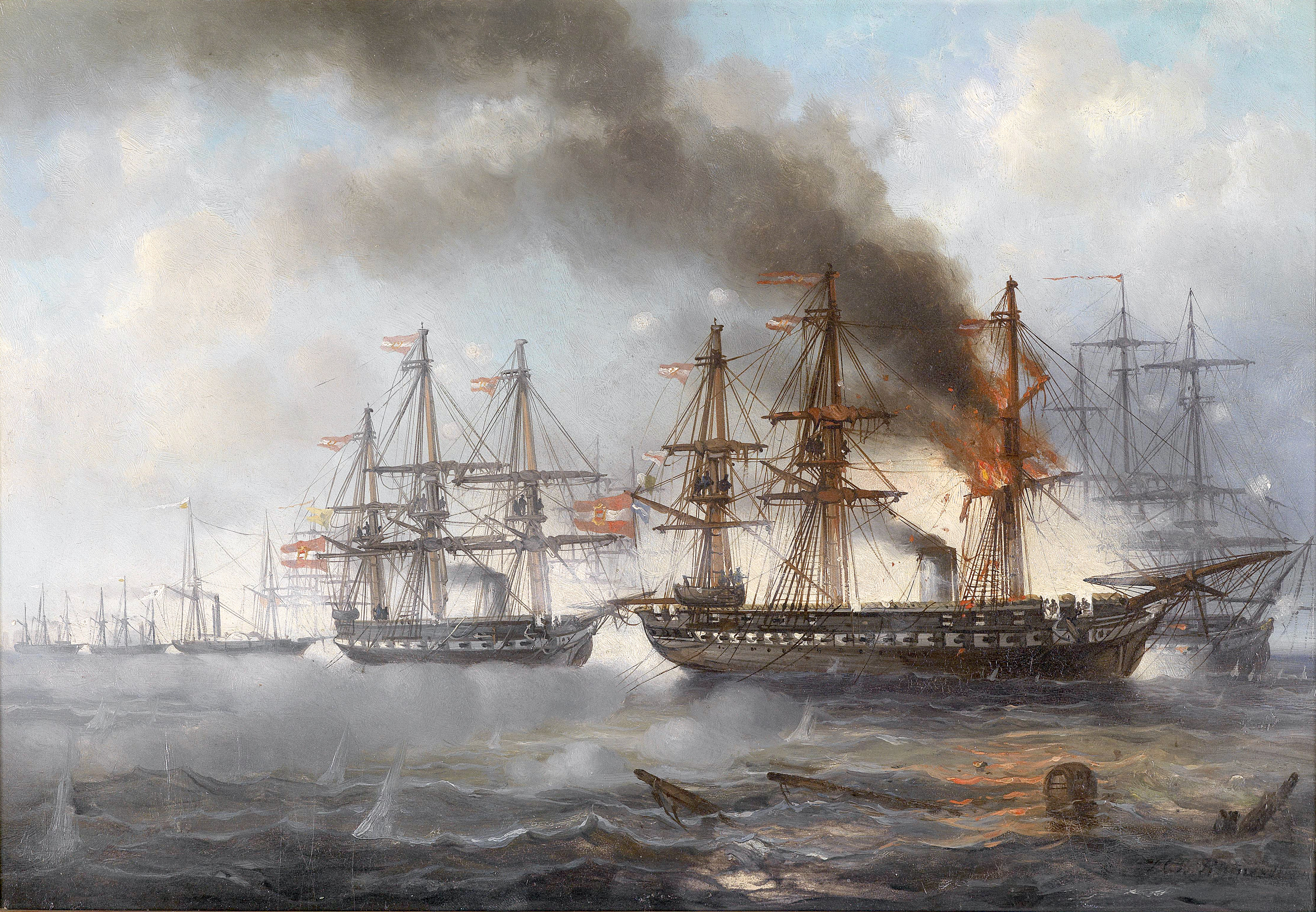
The Battle of Heligoland by Josef Carl Berthold Püttner; Blitz and the other Prussian vessels are visible in the left background

The crisis between Denmark and the German Confederation erupted in the Second Schleswig War, which began on 1 February 1864, after the Prussian and Austrian Empires delivered an ultimatum to Denmark to cede the disputed duchies to Austro-Prussian control. At the time, the Danish fleet was far superior to the Prussian naval forces initially available, which allowed the Danes to blockade the German coast. To assist the Prussians, the Austrian Navy sent Kommodore (Commodore) Wilhelm von Tegetthoff with the screw frigates Schwarzenberg and Radetzky to break the Danish blockade. The Austrian and Prussian squadrons rendezvoused in Texel, the Netherlands, and Blitz and the other Prussian vessels came under Tegetthoff's command. On 4 May, the combined squadron arrived in Cuxhaven, then an enclave of the free city of Hamburg, at the mouth of the Elbe river.

On the morning of 9 May, Tegetthoff learned that a Danish squadron consisting of the steam frigates Niels Juel and Jylland and the corvette Hejmdal were patrolling off the island of Heligoland. Tegetthoff took the five ships under his command out to attack the Danish vessels, resulting in the Battle of Heligoland. Blitz and the other Prussian ships were too slow to keep pace with Schwarzenberg and Radetzky. After Schwarzenberg caught fire, Tegetthoff broke off the action and escaped to the neutral waters around Heligoland, where the ships remained until early the next day. During the period off Heligoland, the Prussian vessels sent their doctors to the Austrian frigates to help tend to their wounded. The next morning, the ships returned to Cuxhaven. Though the Danish squadron had won a tactical victory at Heligoland, the arrival of Austrian warships in the North Sea forced the Danes to withdraw their blockade.

In June, a second Austrian squadron arrived, which included the ship of the line Kaiser and the armored frigate Don Juan d'Austria; the now outnumbered Danish fleet remained in port for the rest of the war and did not seek battle with the Austro-Prussian squadron. For the next month, Blitz and the rest of the Austro-Prussian squadron patrolled the North Sea, taking Danish prizes. On 19 July, Blitz, Basilisk, and three Austrian gunboats supported landing operations conducted with two companies from the Austrian Kaiserjäger-Regiment in the North Frisian Islands. The operations were covered by the heavy units of the Austrian fleet, including Kaiser Don Juan d'Austria, and the corvette Erzherzog Friedrich, though the Danish fleet did not venture out to oppose the landing. The Danes could muster only a small force of light craft, including two small armored steamers, and several cutters and dinghies.

With the war all but over by August, the Austrian and Prussian warships were visited on 20 August by the commanders of the Prussian and Austrian armies that had conquered Denmark, Prince Friedrich Karl of Prussia and Field Marshal Ludwig von Gablenz, respectively. Prince Adalbert visited the ships on 31 August. On 28 November, Blitz, Basilisk, and the corvette Augusta passed through the Kattegat and into the Baltic, arriving in Stralsund, where they were decommissioned on 10 December.

=== Later career ===
In 1865, the boat's 24-pounder was replaced with a rifled 21 cm (8.3 in) 68-pounder gun. At the start of the Austro-Prussian War in June 1866, Blitz was mobilized for wartime service, though her reactivation was delayed by shortages of engine and boiler room personnel. She was initially stationed in the Baltic, but in early July was transferred to the North Sea. There, she joined a unit commanded by then-Korvettenkapitän (KK—Corvette Captain) Reinhold von Werner from his flagship, the ironclad turret ship Arminius. For the duration of the conflict, the flotilla operated out of Geestemünde. Without a naval threat from Austria, the Prussian navy therefore concentrated its effort against the Kingdom of Hanover. After the Hanoverian coastal fortresses were occupied, Blitz returned to Geestemünde on 25 September.

With the war over, Blitz was deployed to the Mediterranean a second time, now to represent the interests of the newly formed North German Confederation. She arrived in Constantinople on 12 January 1867. On 3 March, the boat was sent from Smyrna to the island of Mytilene to bring supplies to the population in the aftermath of a severe earthquake. She was joined in this endeavor by the North German steam frigate Gazelle. Blitz made a second trip to Mytilene on 16 March; on the return legs of both voyages, she evacuated refugees to mainland Anatolia. In September 1867, Blitz was sent to the island of Crete, then in the midst of the Cretan Revolt; between two trips that month, she carried more than 500 women and children first to the island of Milos and then to Piraeus. She was thereafter joined by the corvette Medusa, the two vessels remaining in Cretan waters until the end of November. Blitz returned to Smyrna, but was sent to Chios on 4 December along with the frigate Hertha to assist the French corvette Roland, which had run aground on the island. The Germans helped to lighten Roland until she could be pulled free; for their efforts, the French government awarded the Legion of Honor to Blitz's commander.

After assisting Roland, Blitz returned to Smyrna, before being sent to the Aegean Sea to represent German interests there. On 22 April 1868, she steamed to the Black Sea for another stint at Sulina. She proceeded up the Danube to Galați, and there, on 2 May, she received the order to return to Germany. Blitz arrived in Stralsund on 3 July, where she was withdrawn from active duty. She underwent an extensive overhaul at the Königliche Werft in Danzig in 1869. Shortly after the start of the Franco-Prussian War in July 1870, the gunboat was recommissioned on the 24th of the month. She was assigned to a gunboat flotilla commanded by KK Franz von Waldersee, along with the aviso Grille and the gunboats Salamander and Drache. On 12 August, Waldersee took his four vessels to Rügen, where they briefly engaged blockading French vessels before returning to port. On 10 September, the unit was disbanded, and Blitz was sent first to Kiel and then in October to Wilhelmshaven to strengthen the defenses of the Jade Bay. She remained there until the end of January 1871, when she and Drache steamed to Tönning; there, they towed several cannon-armed shallops back to Wilhelmshaven.

Following the end of the war in May, Blitz was stationed as a guard ship in the Elbe, primarily in Glückstadt, where a large number of French prisoners of war were being transferred back to France. In July, Blitz became a fishery protection ship; though the duty was generally uneventful, in one case she had to fire a warning shot toward a British fishing vessel to force the crew to recognize German sovereignty. In late July, Blitz steamed to the island of Sylt, where Kronprinz (Crown Prince) Frederick, his wife Kronprinzessin (Crown Princess) Victoria, and their two sons, Wilhelm and Heinrich came aboard for a fishing trip. From 7 October 1871 to June 1872, Blitz was stationed as a guard ship in Altona, and on 26 June she began another stint as a fishery protection ship. While Blitz was patrolling in the northern North Sea on 29 June, one of her masts broke, forcing her to put into Aberdeen, Scotland for repairs. The crew's unfamiliarity with tidal conditions in Aberdeen nearly caused the boat to run aground. On 5 July, Blitz was ready to depart for the Shetland Islands, and she arrived in Lerwick three days later. On 9 July, she began the journey back to Germany, arriving in Wihelmshaven on the 20th.

Upon reaching Wilhelmshaven, she entered the Kaiserliche Werft (Imperial Shipyard) for an overhaul that lasted until 30 July. She thereafter went to Cuxhaven, where she temporarily hosted Prince Friedrich Karl. On 29 September, she once again became a guard ship in Altona, though only briefly, before returning to Wilhelmshaven, where she was decommissioned. On 16 April 1873, Blitz was reactivated for survey work with the aviso Pommerania. She was equipped for this service in Kiel on 2 May, and on 16 May began surveying the coast of Mecklenburg. By the end of October, she returned to Wilhelmshaven, where she was again decommissioned on 12 November. She returned to active service one last time in 1874, again for survey work, this time the coast of Holstein. This work lasted until October, when she was decommissioned for the last time. Blitz was stricken from the naval register on 28 December 1876 and converted into a coal storage hulk, though she served in this capacity for less than two years before being broken up for scrap in 1878, at the now-Kaiserliche Werft (Imperial Shipyard) in Danzig. Some parts of her machinery were reused in the gunboat Wolf.
