= SMS Delphin =

Gunboat of the Prussian and German Imperial Navy

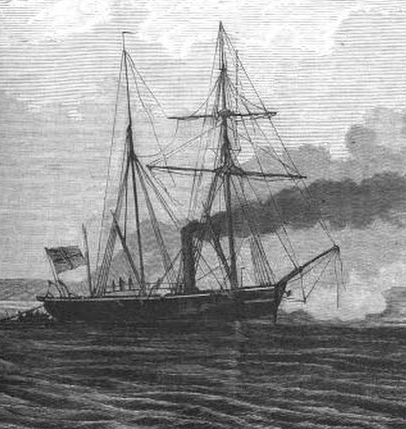
- Illustration of Delphin's sister ship Meteor

History
- Name: Delphin
- Operator: Prussian Navy; Imperial German Navy
- Builder: Königliche Werft, Danzig
- Laid down: 8 September 1859
- Launched: 15 September 1860
- Completed: September 1861
- Decommissioned: 13 August 1881
- Stricken: 30 September 1881
- Fate: Broken up

General characteristics
- Class & type: Camäleon-class gunboat
- Displacement: 422 t (415 long tons)
- Length: 43.28 m (142 ft)
- Beam: 6.96 m (22 ft 10 in)
- Draft: 2.67 m (8 ft 9 in)
- Installed power: 250 to 320 PS (250 to 320 ihp)
- Propulsion: 1 × marine steam engine
- Speed: 9.1 to 9.3 kn (16.9 to 17.2 km/h; 10.5 to 10.7 mph)
- Complement: 71
- Armament: 1 × 15 cm (5.9 in) gun; 2 × 12 cm (4.7 in) guns

SMS Delphin was a Camäleon-class steam gunboat of the Prussian Navy (later the Imperial German Navy) that was launched in 1860. The ship was ordered as part of a program to strengthen Prussia's coastal defense forces, then oriented against neighboring Denmark. A small vessel, armed with a battery of only three light guns, Delphin served during the Second Schleswig War of 1864 and the Austro-Prussian War of 1866, part of the conflicts that unified Germany. The ship was present at, but was only lightly engaged in the Battle of Jasmund during the Second Schleswig War. The ship spent much of the rest of her career in the Mediterranean Sea, going on three lengthy deployments there in 1865–1866, 1867–1870, and 1871–1873. During the last tour, she took part in operations off the coast of Spain with an Anglo-German squadron during the Third Carlist War, where she helped to suppress forces rebelling against the Spanish government. For the rest of the 1870s, she served as a survey vessel in the North and Baltic Seas before being decommissioned in August 1881, stricken from the naval register the following month, and subsequently broken up for scrap.

== Design ==
The Camäleon class came about as a result of a program to strengthen the Prussian Navy in the late 1850s in the aftermath of the dissolution of the Reichsflotte and in the midst of rising tensions with Denmark. In 1859, Prince Regent Wilhelm approved a construction program for some fifty-two steam gunboats to be built over the next fifteen years, of which eight became the Camäleon class. They were similar to the contemporaneous Jäger-class gunboats, but were substantially larger vessels. These ships were intended to defend the Prussian coast in the event of another war with Denmark.

Delphin was 43.28 meters (142 ft) long, with a beam of 6.96 m (22 ft 10 in) and a draft of 2.67 m (8 ft 9 in). She displaced 422 metric tons (415 long tons) at full load. The ship's crew consisted of 4 officers and 67 enlisted men. She was powered by a single marine steam engine that drove one 3-bladed screw propeller, with steam provided by two coal-fired trunk boilers, which gave her a top speed of 9.1 knots (16.9 km/h; 10.5 mph) at 250 metric horsepower (250 ihp). As built, she was equipped with a three-masted schooner rig. The ship was armed with a battery of one rifled 15 cm (5.9 in) 24-pounder muzzle-loading gun and two rifled 12 cm (4.7 in) 12-pounder muzzle-loading guns.

== Service history ==
=== Construction through 1866 ===
The keel for Delphin was laid down at the Königliche Werft (Royal Dockyard) in Danzig on 8 September 1859. She was launched a little over a year later, on 15 September 1860. After completing fitting-out, she was transferred to the naval base at Stralsund in September 1861, and while en route conducted speed trials that demonstrated Delphin was capable of a speed 1.5 knots (2.8 km/h; 1.7 mph) higher than her sister ships. Her higher speed led to several overseas deployments later in her career, though like her sisters, she was initially laid up in reserve after completion. In late 1863, tensions began to rise between Prussia and Austria of the German Confederation and Denmark over the latter's November Constitution, which integrated the duchies of Schleswig, Holstein, and Lauenburg with Denmark, a violation of the London Protocol that had ended the First Schleswig War. On 1 March 1864, after the start of the Second Schleswig War, Delphin was reactivated and stationed in Dänholm off Stralsund. There, she was assigned to the II Flotilla Division. On 14 April, after a minor action off the island of Hiddensee, in which Delphin did not take part, the Prussian gunboat flotilla was reduced to a reserve formation and took no further active part in the war. After the war in 1865, Delphin was tasked with surveying Eckernförde Bay outside Kiel in Holstein, which was now under the administration of the German Confederation. From 1 to 3 March, Delphin served as an ice breaker in Eckernförde Bay.

In February, the naval high command had decided to send Delphin to Constantinople, the capital of the Ottoman Empire, to serve as a station ship to protect German interests in the region. Accordingly, Delphin underwent a major overhaul to prepare her for the overseas deployment. During the overhaul, her schooner rig was reduced slightly to a barquentine rig, and the boat's 24-pounder was replaced with a rifled 21 cm (8.3 in) 68-pounder gun. Delphin conducted a training cruise with the corvette Nymphe to Sonderburg, Travemünde, and Wismar from 20 to 23 July. On 3 August, Delphin towed the frigate Niobe back to port after the latter had had her rigging damaged in a storm. Three days later, Delphin left Prussia for the Mediterranean Sea in company with Nymphe, stopping initially in Piraeus on 22 September. The vessels' deployment was short-lived, however, as war with Austria threatened in April 1866, and both ships were recalled to Prussia. They arrived on 3 July, the day the Prussian army decisively defeated Austria at the Battle of Königgrätz. For the remainder of the war, Delphin was assigned to the North Sea Flotilla, which was commanded by then-Korvettenkapitän (KK—Corvette Captain) Reinhold von Werner from his flagship, the ironclad turret ship Arminius. For the duration of the conflict, the flotilla operated out of Geestemünde. Without a naval threat from Austria, the Prussian navy therefore concentrated its effort against the Kingdom of Hanover. On 22 August, Delphin was decommissioned in Danzig.

=== 1867–1881 ===
In 1867, the high command decided to send Delphin back to the Mediterranean. She was sent to the Königliche Werft in Danzig for a reconstruction that would make the vessel more suitable for an extended overseas assignment. This included replacing old or damaged hull timbers, installing a new deck, and rebuilding the crew spaces to make them more habitable. On 1 May 1868, Delphin was finally recommissioned for her assignment, but conflicts in the Reichstag (Diet of the Realm) over budgets forced the navy to cancel Delphin's deployment to save money. Accordingly, she was placed out of service temporarily. In August, Delphin was recommissioned and on the 21st, began the voyage to the Mediterranean. While en route, damage to her engine forced her to stop in Algiers for repairs. She finally reached Constantinople on 17 October, and on 24 October she steamed to the mouth of the Danube at Sulina. She steamed about 300 nautical miles (560 km; 350 mi) upstream to the town of Giurgiu before returning to Constantinople. She made a similar trip up the Danube in 1869, and also stopped in Varna, Bulgaria on the way back to Constantinople.

In October, Delphin took Crown Prince Friedrich Wilhelm from Corinth, Greece to Constantinople, where he met Sultan Abdülaziz. Friedrich Wilhelm then moved to the corvette Hertha, and on 28 October, Delphin was sent to Port Said, where the opening ceremonies of the Suez Canal were scheduled to take place on 17 November. There, she investigated the possibility of Friedrich Wilhelm transiting the canal aboard Hertha. She remained there for the ceremonies, staying there until 10 December when she returned to Constantinople. On 11 April 1870, Delphin received the order to return to Prussia, though she was damaged off the mouth of the Tagus River in Portugal, forcing her to put into Lisbon for repairs. She reached Plymouth on 16 June, where she rendezvoused with the armored frigate Kronprinz and the artillery school ship Renown from the Armored Squadron. Three days later, she joined the Armored Squadron for a cruise in the Atlantic, though on 22 June, Delphin and Renown were detached to return to Prussia. They arrived in Kiel on 28 June, where Delphin was decommissioned on 11 July.

Delphin was in need of repairs after her lengthy tour in the Mediterranean; as a result, she was not recommissioned when the Franco-Prussian War broke out eight days after her decommissioning. The vessel was ready to return to service only by 22 April 1871, by which time the war was all but over. She was ordered to begin another deployment to the Mediterranean on 13 May, but her departure was delayed until 29 August. The ship stopped in Algiers on 29 September and Tunis on 1 October, both in French North Africa; the stops occurred without incident. On 25 October, Delphin arrived in Constantinople. The navy ministry had intended to use Delphin to carry the archaeologist Ernst Curtius back from Piraeus, but he left on another vessel on 12 October, while Delphin was still en route. In February 1872, she carried Prince Friedrich Karl on his tour of Greece and the Ottoman Empire, making stops in Athens, Greece, and Chios, Bursa, and Constantinople in the Ottoman Empire. Delphin cruised the Danube in October and November that year. In early March 1873, the navy sent Delphin to Spain to join the ironclad Friedrich Carl and the corvette Elisabeth to protect German interests during the Third Carlist War. The German vessels, commanded by now-Konteradmiral (Rear Admiral) von Werner, joined a British squadron. The Anglo-German force blockaded Cartagena, which was then controlled by the rebel faction, and attacked two rebel-controlled ironclads, forcing them to surrender.

On 4 October, Delphin was replaced by her sister Meteor. Delphin returned to Kiel, where on 4 December, she was once again decommissioned. Work then began to convert her into a survey vessel; this included removal of her armament, construction of a deck house, replacement of her barquentine rig with a barque rig, and the installation of a new bridge. The work was finished by April 1874, and she thereafter began survey work with her similarly converted sister Blitz. Delphin was again decommissioned for the winter on 21 October. She returned to service each year through 1879 during the summer months, before being decommissioned each year in October or November. During this period, she surveyed the area around Heligoland in 1877 and covered some 2,000 square nautical miles (6,900 km^{2}; 2,600 sq mi) of the Baltic between 1878 and 1879. In 1880 she had her rigging removed, and though not officially commissioned, took part in the raising of the aviso Barbarossa in October and November, which had been sunk in torpedo tests with the aviso Zieten on 14 July. Delphin was recommissioned a last time on 15 March 1881 for service as a fishery protection ship, but this service was short-lived. Delphin was decommissioned on 13 August, stricken from the naval register on 30 September, and thereafter sold to ship breakers for scrap. Her engine was retained for use in one of the Wolf-class gunboats.
