= Reinhold von Werner =

Prussian naval officer

Reinhold Werner
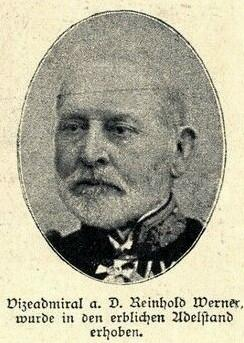
- Reinhold von Werner
- Born: 10 May 1825; Weferlingen, Prussia
- Died: 26 February 1909 (aged 83) Berlin-Charlottenburg
- Allegiance: German Empire
- Branch: Reichsflotte; Preussische Marine; Kaiserliche Marine
- Service years: 1852–1878
- Rank: Vizeadmiral
- Commands: SMS Nymphe; SMS Renown; SMS Kronprinz; SMS Friedrich Carl; Baltic Station
- Conflicts: Second Schleswig War; *Battle of Jasmund; Austro-Prussian War; Franco-Prussian War

Reinhold von Werner (10 May 1825 – 26 February 1909) was a Prussian and later Imperial German naval officer in the 19th century, eventually reaching the rank of vice admiral. He commanded warships during the three wars of German Unification, the Second Schleswig War, the Austro-Prussian War, and the Franco-Prussian War in 1864, 1866, and 1870–1871, respectively, and during a naval intervention during a revolution in Spain in 1873. His actions off Spain, considered extreme by Chancellor Otto von Bismarck, resulted in his court-martial. He was promoted two years after the intervention in Spain, but was forced into retirement after a major feud with Albrecht von Stosch three years later. Werner wrote numerous books during and after his naval career, and also founded a periodical on maritime topics. He was ennobled in 1901 and died in February 1909.

== Early life ==
Reinhold Werner was born on 10 May 1825, in the town of Weferlingen, Prussia in what is now Saxony-Anhalt. He served for several years in the merchant marine in the 1830s and 1840s, during which he made several voyages to the East Indies. While in the merchant marine, he was given the nickname Schweizer (Swiss), as his North German shipmates found his accent to be particularly foreign compared to their native Plattdeutsch.

== Naval career ==
In 1849, Werner became an officer in the German Reichsflotte (Imperial Fleet), which had been organised the year before. In 1852, he transferred to the Preussische Marine (Prussian Navy), at the age of 22. The Preussische Marine accepted only ten applicants to the officer corps that year. Werner was the only officer in the first group who was directly commissioned as a lieutenant; the other nine became officer cadets. He was promoted to the rank of kapitänleutnant (captain lieutenant) in 1856. While commanding the vessel Elbe, he participated in a naval expedition to the Far East in 1859–1862.

=== Wars of German Unification ===
During the Second Schleswig War of 1864, Werner commanded a corvette against Danish naval forces. He fought with distinction at the Battle of Jasmund, under the command of Eduard von Jachmann; Werner's ship, Nymphe, was badly damaged during the engagement and her crew suffered 13 casualties. The Danes successfully blocked the Prussian attempt to break through the Danish blockade, however, and forced them to return to Swinemünde. Werner and the rest of the fleet stationed there remained in port for the rest of the war.

At the outbreak of the Austro-Prussian War, in the summer of 1866, He was given command of a small squadron in the North Sea consisting of the ironclad warship SMS Arminius and a flotilla of small steam gunboats. He used the force to launch several troop landings against the Kingdom of Hanover, an ally of Austria. He led most of the landings himself; his activities forced the surrender of several Hanoverian coastal batteries and several cities, including Emden and Stade. On 15 June, he and his squadron assisted 13,500 men commanded by General Edwin von Manteuffel in their crossing of the Elbe River and assault of the city of Hanover.

After the Austro-Prussian War, Werner was given command of the dock facilities in Danzig, a position he held until 1873. In 1870, the Franco-Prussian War broke out, during which he was given command of the new ironclad Kronprinz. The two other broadside ironclads, Friedrich Carl and SMS König Wilhelm, suffered from chronic engine problems which prevented Admiral Jachmann from using the force offensively. Nevertheless, Werner sortied from Wilhelmshaven several times to trade shots with the blockading French fleet. Directly after the war with France, Werner pledged his support to General Albrecht von Stosch, who had been proposed as the new commander of the German fleet. In the fall of 1872, Werner commanded a training cruise to South America; his squadron consisted of Friedrich Carl, Elisabeth, Albatross, and Vineta. While on the cruise, Werner received orders to return most of the squadron to Europe to participate in an international intervention in Spain. Only Albatross remained in the Americas.

=== Intervention in Spain ===
In early 1873, the First Spanish Republic was beset with the Cantonal Revolution. Werner commanded the ironclad Friedrich Carl (his flagship), Elisabeth, and the gunboat Delphin on a naval intervention mission. The ships joined a British squadron that had been patrolling the southern Spanish coast. Admiral Werner, the senior commander in the group, was given command of the Anglo-German force. A rebel faction of the Spanish Navy had seized four of the country's seven ironclads. Werner's squadron blockaded two rebel ironclads in the port of Cartagena after they had bombarded a coastal town. While steaming off Alicante, Friedrich Carl encountered the rebel armed steamer Vigilante, seized the vessel, and returned it to the Spanish national government.

Werner ordered Friedrich Carl and the British ironclad HMS Swiftsure to attack two of the rebel ships—Vitoria and Almansa—without authorization from London or Berlin. The rebel vessels had attempted to extort the port of Almería. In the brief engagement, the Anglo-German force overwhelmed the rebels and seized both ships, which were subsequently turned over to the Spanish government. A captured rebel leader was briefly held on board Friedrich Carl. The rebels considered declaring war on Germany over the affair, but eventually decided against it. Admiral Werner's blockade eventually forced the rebels to surrender, after which Friedrich Carl returned to Germany. Upon being informed of Werner's actions, Chancellor Otto von Bismarck relieved him of command. Bismarck ordered a court-martial for Werner on the charge of exceeding his orders. Bismarck also prohibited the Imperial Navy from conducting "gunboat diplomacy" in the future. Werner's career as a sea-going captain was effectively ended despite support from Kaiser Wilhelm I and his grandson, the future Wilhelm II; he held only shore commands for the remainder of his career. He commanded the imperial dockyard in Wilhelmshaven for a year before being transferred to Kiel as the commander of the Marinestation der Ostsee (Baltic Sea Naval Station). Werner partly blamed Stosch, who had agreed with Bismarck in his assessment of Werner's activities, for his disgrace. This marked the beginning of a long and public feud between the two officers.

=== Forced retirement ===
In 1875, Werner was promoted to konteradmiral (rear admiral). In the aftermath of the accidental collision between the ironclads König Wilhelm and SMS Grosser Kurfürst, which resulted in the loss of the latter, Werner and Stosch argued, a disagreement that ultimately resulted in Werner's forced retirement. Werner, then the chief of the Baltic station, presided over a commission that investigated the handling of the incident by Konteradmiral Batsch, a protégé of Stosch. The investigation heavily criticized Batsch as well as Stosch's policies. Many naval officers—including Batsch—felt Stosch's policies were more appropriate for the army than the navy. Alfred von Tirpitz, later the architect of the German High Seas Fleet, characterized Stosch's policies as more befitting an infantry regiment than an armoured warship, which was a "complicated microcosm of technology." Stosch fought back against his critics, and targeted Werner in particular, who Stosch felt was primarily responsible for allowing the investigation to become a forum for officers opposed to himself. In addition to revenge for the handling of the investigation, Stosch sought to force Werner from the navy to remove one of only two officers senior in rank to Batsch, his protégé. Despite his popularity, particularly with Kaiser Wilhelm I and his son, Werner was unable to resist Stosch's efforts to force his ouster. On 15 October 1878, he requested retirement. In 1898, the navy nominated him to be promoted to vizeadmiral (vice admiral).

== Later life ==
After leaving the navy, Werner became an author and ardent supporter of German naval expansion. He continued his feud with Stosch, going so far as to ally himself with Otto von Bismarck, who had sought Werner's imprisonment five years earlier for his conduct off Spain. He also joined the rightist Free Union for Naval Lectures, founded on 16 November 1899; the union conducted a series of public lectures on the importance of the navy throughout Germany. Werner had begun writing in the 1860s, while still in the navy. He wrote a series of books, including accounts of the German expedition to the Far East from 1859 to 1862 and the development and expansion of the German fleet. In 1864, he founded the periodical Hansa in Hamburg, which was concerned with topics relating to seamanship and coast guard activities. He was elevated to the nobility in 1901 and granted the right to use "von" in his name, and died on 26 February 1909.
