= SMS Comet (1860) =

Gunboat of the Prussian and German Imperial Navy

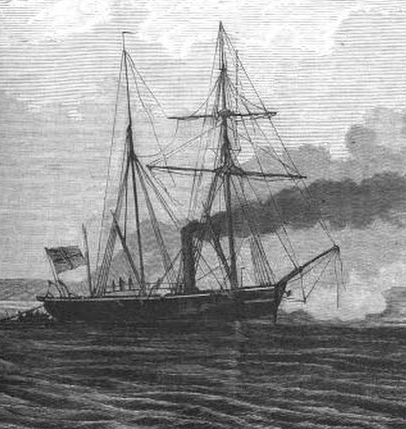
- Illustration of Comet's sister ship Meteor

History
- Name: Comet
- Operator: Prussian Navy; Imperial German Navy
- Builder: Königliche Werft, Danzig
- Laid down: 1 September 1859
- Launched: 1 September 1860
- Commissioned: 1861
- Decommissioned: 1881
- Stricken: 30 September 1881

General characteristics
- Class & type: Camäleon-class gunboat
- Displacement: 422 t (415 long tons)
- Length: 43.28 m (142 ft)
- Beam: 6.96 m (22 ft 10 in)
- Draft: 2.67 m (8 ft 9 in)
- Installed power: 250 to 320 PS (250 to 320 ihp)
- Propulsion: 1 × marine steam engine
- Speed: 9.1 to 9.3 kn (16.9 to 17.2 km/h; 10.5 to 10.7 mph)
- Complement: 71
- Armament: 1 × 15 cm (5.9 in) gun; 2 × 12 cm (4.7 in) guns

SMS Comet was a Camäleon-class steam gunboat of the Prussian Navy (later the Imperial German Navy) that was launched in 1860. The ship was ordered as part of a program to strengthen Prussia's coastal defense forces, then oriented against neighboring Denmark. A small vessel, armed with a battery of only three light guns, Comet served during the Second Schleswig War of 1864 and the Franco-Prussian War of 1870–1871, part of the conflicts that unified Germany. The ship was present at, but was only lightly engaged in the Battle of Jasmund during the Second Schleswig War. She served in a variety of roles during peacetime, including fishery protection and survey work. Comet went on one lengthy deployment abroad, with an assignment to the Mediterranean Sea from 1876 to 1879. She saw little active service after returning to Germany and was decommissioned and hulked in 1881. The vessel remained in the navy's inventory until at least 1891, being broken up sometime thereafter.

== Design ==
The Camäleon class came about as a result of a program to strengthen the Prussian Navy in the late 1850s in the aftermath of the dissolution of the Reichsflotte and in the midst of rising tensions with Denmark. In 1859, Prince Regent Wilhelm approved a construction program for some fifty-two steam gunboats to be built over the next fifteen years, of which eight became the Camäleon class. They were similar to the contemporaneous Jäger-class gunboats, but were substantially larger vessels. These ships were intended to defend the Prussian coast in the event of another war with Denmark.

Comet was 43.28 meters (142 ft) long, with a beam of 6.96 m (22 ft 10 in) and a draft of 2.67 m (8 ft 9 in). She displaced 422 metric tons (415 long tons) at full load. The ship's crew consisted of 4 officers and 67 enlisted men. She was powered by a single marine steam engine that drove one 3-bladed screw propeller, with steam provided by two coal-fired trunk boilers, which gave her a top speed of 9.1 knots (16.9 km/h; 10.5 mph) at 250 metric horsepower (250 ihp). As built, she was equipped with a three-masted schooner rig. The ship was armed with a battery of one rifled 15 cm (5.9 in) 24-pounder gun and two rifled 12 cm (4.7 in) 12-pounder guns.

== Service history ==
=== Construction through 1868 ===
Comet was laid down at the Königliche Werft (Royal Dockyard) in Danzig on 1 September 1859. She was launched exactly one year later on 1 September 1860, and entered service in mid-1861 for sea trials, which were conducted in the course of visits to the three remaining Hanseatic cities, Lübeck, Hamburg, and Bremen, in company with the corvette Amazone. Upon completion of the tour, Comet returned to Danzig, where she was decommissioned on 12 October. In late 1863, tensions began to rise between Prussia and Denmark over the latter's November Constitution, which integrated the duchies of Schleswig, Holstein, and Lauenburg with Denmark, a violation of the London Protocol that had ended the First Schleswig War. On 1 March 1864, after the start of the Second Schleswig War, Comet was reactivated and stationed in Dänholm off Stralsund. There, she was assigned to the I Flotilla, where she served as the lead vessel in the II Division.

The flotilla was deployed on 17 March to support Captain Eduard von Jachmann's corvettes at the Battle of Jasmund, but the gunboats were only lightly engaged. Jachmann had ordered them to take up a position closer to land to cover a potential withdrawal, and so they were too far to take part in the main action. Nevertheless, as the Danish steam frigate Tordenskjold arrived to reinforce the main squadron, Comet and the other gunboats fired on her from afar. Tordenskjold's commander ignored the gunboats and continued south to join the fight with Jachmann's corvettes, firing only a few broadsides at the gunboats in passing, with neither side scoring any hits. On 14 April, after a minor action off the island of Hiddensee, in which Comet did not take part, the Prussian gunboat flotilla was reduced to a reserve formation and took no further active part in the war. On 19 April, Comet collided with the aviso Loreley, but neither vessel was damaged. In August, Comet helped to free the aviso Grille, which had run aground in the Trave. With the Prussian victory in October, Comet took part in a naval review held for King Wilhelm I, followed by a tour of ports in Holstein with now Konteradmiral (Rear Admiral) Jachmann.

Following the tour in October, Comet was tasked with conducting surveys of the eastern coast of Holstein. After that work was completed, Comet was transferred to the newly acquired port of Kiel, where she remained through the winter of 1864–1865. In March 1865, the reserve formation to which Comet had been assigned was disbanded, and Comet, her sister ship Camäleon, and Loreley were sent to the North Sea for additional surveying. Comet returned to Dänholm on 8 December, where she was decommissioned. At some point during the year, the boat's 24-pounder was replaced with a rifled 21 cm (8.3 in) 68-pounder gun. She was not mobilized during the Austro-Prussian War of 1866, and instead next saw active service in 1868 in what was now the navy of the North German Confederation, being reactivated on 21 April for fishery protection duty. At the time, British fishermen routinely fished in German territorial waters in the North Sea illegally, and Comet was sent there to prevent these activities. She left Dänholm on 1 May and arrived on station four days later, the first German fishery protection vessel in the North Sea. During this period, she also conducted survey work in the area before steaming to Geestemünde, where she was again decommissioned. The vessel's commander in 1868 was then-Kapitänleutnant (Captain Lieutenant) Friedrich von Hacke.

=== 1868–1891 ===
Comet was recommissioned in 1869 to perform the same duties as in the previous year; 1870 followed the same pattern as well, until the outbreak of the Franco-Prussian War in July interrupted Comet's activities. On 16 July, Comet was assigned to the defense force in the Jade Bay outside Wilhelmshaven, but she saw no action during the conflict. She was decommissioned on 29 April 1871, at which point an investigation of her hull revealed the necessity of a major overhaul, which was done at the Königliche Werft in Danzig. Work ended in May 1872. In December, Comet was sent into the Baltic to search for vessels that had been wrecked in a severe storm, and if necessary, sink them to prevent them from becoming navigational hazards. She returned to Kiel without having located any wrecks on 31 December, in advance of the heavy sea ice that occurred in the Baltic every winter. Admiral Albrecht von Stosch, the chief of the German admiralty, did not consider Comet to have sufficiently performed her duties, and so he relieved her captain of his command. With a new commander, Comet was sent out again on 5 January 1873, and this time did succeed in finding and sinking several wrecked vessels. After returning to Kiel on 24 January, she was decommissioned, but was temporarily recommissioned from 5 to 20 March for another patrol in the Baltic for wrecked ships. During this period, a detachment from the Torpedo Division based in Wilhelmshaven came aboard the vessel to test their new towed torpedoes. On 12 March, while cruising north of Cape Arkona, Comet encountered a wrecked vessel and was able to sink it with one of the torpedoes.

On 18 September, Comet was transferred to Wilhelmshaven, where trials with new boilers were conducted. She was decommissioned there on 11 October. The ship remained out of service until 14 May 1876, when she was recommissioned for a deployment to the Mediterranean Sea. The German and French consuls in Salonika during a wave of anti-European sentiment in the Ottoman Empire, prompting Germany to reinforce its squadron in the Mediterranean. On 18 May, Comet left Kiel and reached Gibraltar on 5 June, before joining the German Armored Squadron in the eastern Mediterranean; she arrived in Salonika on 26 June. In late July, she steamed to Constantinople, the Ottoman capital, where she relieved the gunboat Nautilus so the latter vessel could be sent to Asian waters. Comet became one of two station ships in Constantinople, along with her sister Meteor. She remained there until mid-November, when she returned to Salonika via Smyrna to replace the aviso Pommerania on 4 December. She remained there only briefly, however, as by mid-December, she had to return to Constantinople to replace Meteor.

Following the outbreak of the Russo-Turkish War in April 1877, Comet, Meteor, and Pommerania were concentrated in Constantinople for fear of resumed anti-European riots. Later that year, the Armored Squadron was recalled to Germany, followed by Meteor, leaving just Comet and a handful of small vessels. Comet went to Mytilene on 29 December 1878, remaining there until February 1879, when she moved to Smyrna. During this period, she left for shooting practice in the Sea of Marmara and then a visit to the mouth of the Danube river in the Black Sea from late June to late July. On 3 September, after having returned to Constantinople, Comet was recalled to Germany, arriving in Kiel to be decommissioned on 8 November. She was reactivated, though not formally recommissioned, in October and November 1880 to help raise the aviso Barbarossa, which had been sunk in torpedo tests with the aviso Zieten on 14 July. In 1881, Comet was recommissioned briefly for fishery protection service in the Baltic, but she was decommissioned again and stricken from the naval register on 30 September. She remained in the navy's inventory for another decade in service as a storage hulk. She was broken up for scrap some time after 1891.
