= SMS Salamander (1860) =

Prussian gunboat

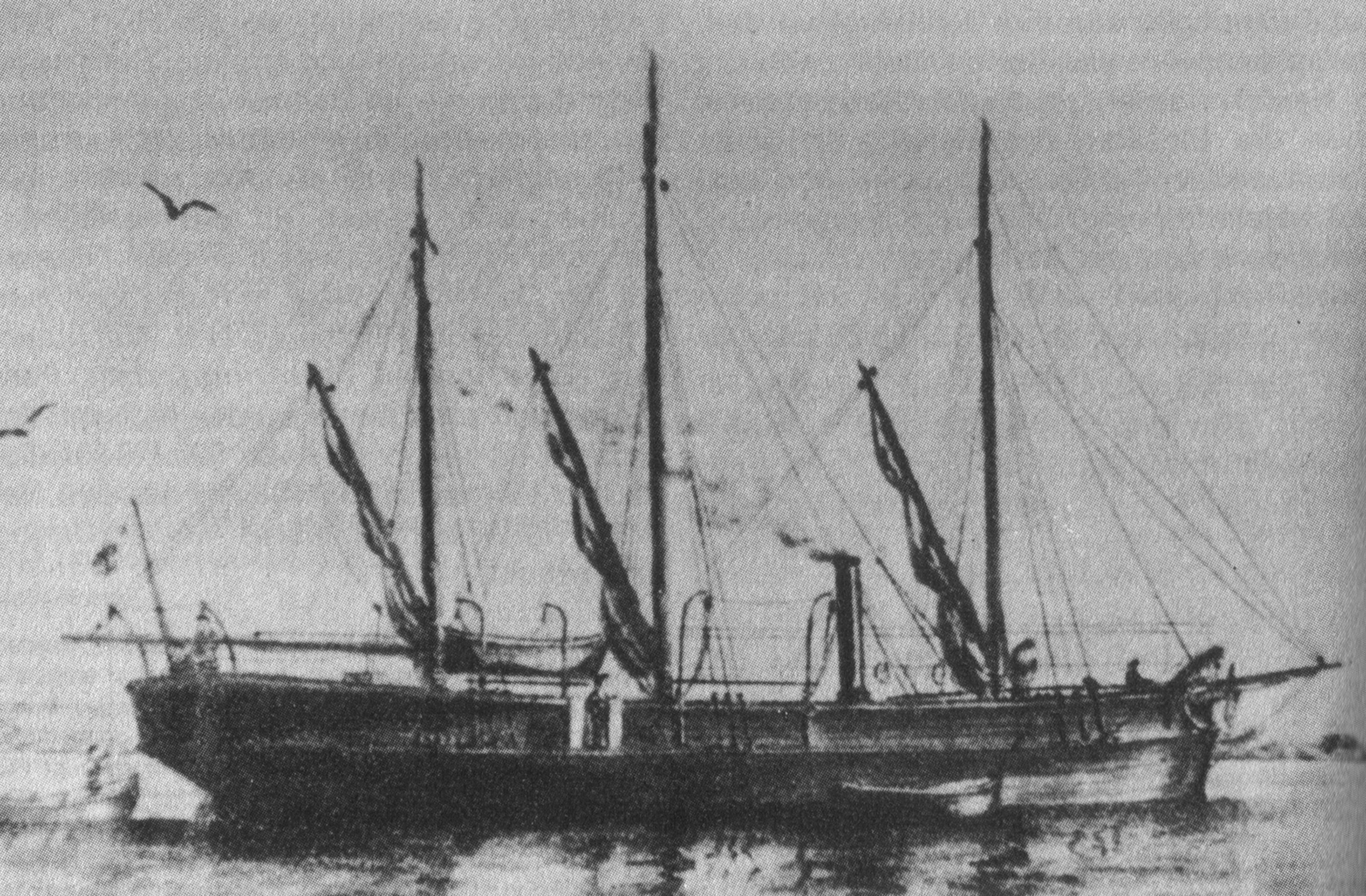
- Salamander's sister Fuchs

History
- Name: Salamander
- Namesake: Salamander
- Operator: Prussian Navy; Imperial German Navy
- Builder: A. G. Nüscke, Grabow
- Laid down: 1859
- Launched: 14 February 1860
- Commissioned: 20 June 1861
- Decommissioned: 15 June 1875
- Stricken: 12 November 1878

General characteristics
- Type: Jäger-class gunboat
- Displacement: Design: 237 t (233 long tons); Full load: 283 t (279 long tons)
- Length: 41.2 m (135 ft 2 in)
- Beam: 6.69 m (21 ft 11 in)
- Draft: 2.2 m (7 ft 3 in)
- Installed power: 4 × boilers; 220 PS (220 ihp)
- Propulsion: 2 × marine steam engines; 1 × screw propeller
- Speed: 9 knots (17 km/h; 10 mph)
- Complement: 2 officers; 38 enlisted
- Armament: 1 × 24-pounder gun; 2 × 12-pounder guns

SMS Salamander was a steam gunboat of the Jäger class built for the Prussian Navy in the late 1850s and early 1860s. The ship was ordered as part of a program to strengthen Prussia's coastal defense forces, then oriented against neighboring Denmark. She was armed with a battery of three guns. The ship saw very little activity during her career. She was activated during the Second Schleswig War against Denmark in 1864 and the Franco-Prussian War in 1870, being used to defend the Prussian coast. During the latter conflict, she was present for a brief action with French ships in the Baltic Sea. She remained in service through 1875, when she was placed in reserve, where she remained until 1878, when she was struck from the naval register. She was thereafter used as a barge.

== Design ==
Profile drawing showing the internal arrangement of the class

The Jäger class of steam gunboats came about as a result of a program to strengthen the Prussian Navy in the late 1850s in the aftermath of the First Schleswig War against Denmark. The wartime Reichsflotte (Imperial Fleet) had been dissolved, but tensions with Denmark remained high. In 1859, Prince Regent Wilhelm approved a construction program for some fifty-two gunboats to be built over the next fifteen years, which began with the fifteen vessels of the Jäger class. These ships were intended to defend the Prussian coast in the event of another war with Denmark.

Salamander was 41.2 meters (135 ft 2 in) long overall, with a beam of 6.69 m (21 ft 11 in) and a draft of 2.2 m (7 ft 3 in). She displaced 237 metric tons (233 long tons) normally and 283 t (279 long tons) at full load. The ship's crew consisted of 2 officers and 38 enlisted men. She was powered by a pair of marine steam engines that drove one 3-bladed screw propeller, with steam provided by four coal-fired trunk boilers, which gave her a top speed of 9.1 knots (16.9 km/h; 10.5 mph) at 220 metric horsepower (220 ihp). As built, she was equipped with a three-masted schooner rig, which was later removed. The Jäger-class gunboats handled badly and tended to take on water in heavy seas. The ship was armed with a battery of one rifled 24-pounder muzzle-loading gun and two rifled 12-pounder muzzle-loading guns.

== Service history ==
Illustration of a Jäger-class gunboat

Salamander was built at the A. G. Nüscke shipyard in Grabow. Her keel was laid down in 1859 and she was launched on 14 February 1860. The ship was named for the earlier Salamander, a paddle-wheel aviso in service in the early 1850s. She was completed late that year and was immediately send to Stralsund and then laid up on the nearby island of Dänholm. The ship was first commissioned for active service on 20 June 1861 to join a gunboat division. The division, which also included the gunboats Camäleon, Comet, Jäger, Fuchs, and Scorpion, embarked on a short tour of northern European waters that included a visit to Skagen in Denmark and the free imperial cities of Hamburg and Bremen. After the stop in Skagen, the corvette Amazone and the schooner Hela joined the flotilla of gunboats. While on their way back to Prussia in September, they stopped in Lübeck. After arriving back in Prussia, Salamander was decommissioned on 14 October and placed in reserve. While out of service, her copper sheathing was removed from her hull so ventilation holes could be cut into the outer planking. Her entire propulsion system, including the masts and the funnel, was removed and a roof was erected over the hull to keep the elements out.

The ship remained out of service for the next few years. On 8 December 1863, the Prussian Navy ordered the fleet to mobilize, as tensions between Prussia and Denmark over the Schleswig–Holstein question rose sharply. Mobilization meant that Salamander and the rest of the gunboats at Stralsund would have to be reconstructed. On 21 February 1864, Salamander was recommissioned due to the start of the Second Schleswig War between Denmark and an Austro-Prussian alliance. The Prussian gunboat divisions were assigned to guard the main Prussian ports on the Baltic coast, namely Stralsund, Stettin, and Swinemünde after the Royal Danish Navy imposed a blockade of the ports. Salamander was assigned to the 3rd Flotilla Division, and she participated in a minor action off Hiddensee on 3 July. A formal armistice then went into effect on 20 July. On 20 October, the combatants signed the Treaty of Vienna, formally ending the war. Salamander was decommissioned again seven days later and was placed back in reserve.

The ship remained out of service until the start of the Franco-Prussian War in 1870; she was recommissioned on 24 July and was assigned to the Gunboat Flotilla. The unit was led by the aviso Grille and was based at Swinemünde, under the command of Franz von Waldersee; the vessels were used to guard the island of Rügen. In August 1870, the ships sortied to attack a French squadron, resulting in an inconclusive action off Hiddensee on 17 August. Salamander was detached to strengthen the Prussian naval forces at Wilhelmshaven on Prussia's North Sea coast in early October. On 11 April 1871, she was decommissioned again, by this time having been moved to Kiel.

In early 1872, Salamander had her main gun replaced with a more modern, iron 15 cm (5.9 in) RK L/22 gun and her sailing rig was removed. She then returned to active service on 16 August, initially serving as a tender for the training ship Niobe. On 23 October, Salamander carried the new Chief of the Admiralty, Albrecht von Stosch, to inspect the area at Friedrichsort near Kiel. She and the gunboat Meteor were present in the area during a very severe storm that struck the western Baltic Sea on 13 November. Salamander remained in service through the winter of 1872–1873. In the first half of 1873, she took part in training exercises in the Baltic and served as the tender for the new screw corvette Ariadne. During this period, from May to November, Leutnant zur See (Lieutenant at Sea) Richard Geissler served as the ship's captain. In August, she again carried Stosch to Friedrichsort. In January 1874, Unterleutnant zur See (Sub-lieutenant at Sea) Ernst von Frantzius commanded the ship, though he left the following month. Salamander and the gunboat Nautilus were sent in mid-May 1874 to assist the screw corvette Nymphe, which had run aground off Langeland on the way back from her world cruise. Salamander thereafter resumed tender duties, a role she filled until mid-1875. On 15 June, she was decommissioned for the last time; she remained in reserve until 12 November 1878, when she was struck from the naval register. She was used as a barge, but her ultimate fate is unknown.
