= Battle of Jasmund (1864) =

Naval battle of the Second Schleswig War

- Part of the Second Schleswig War
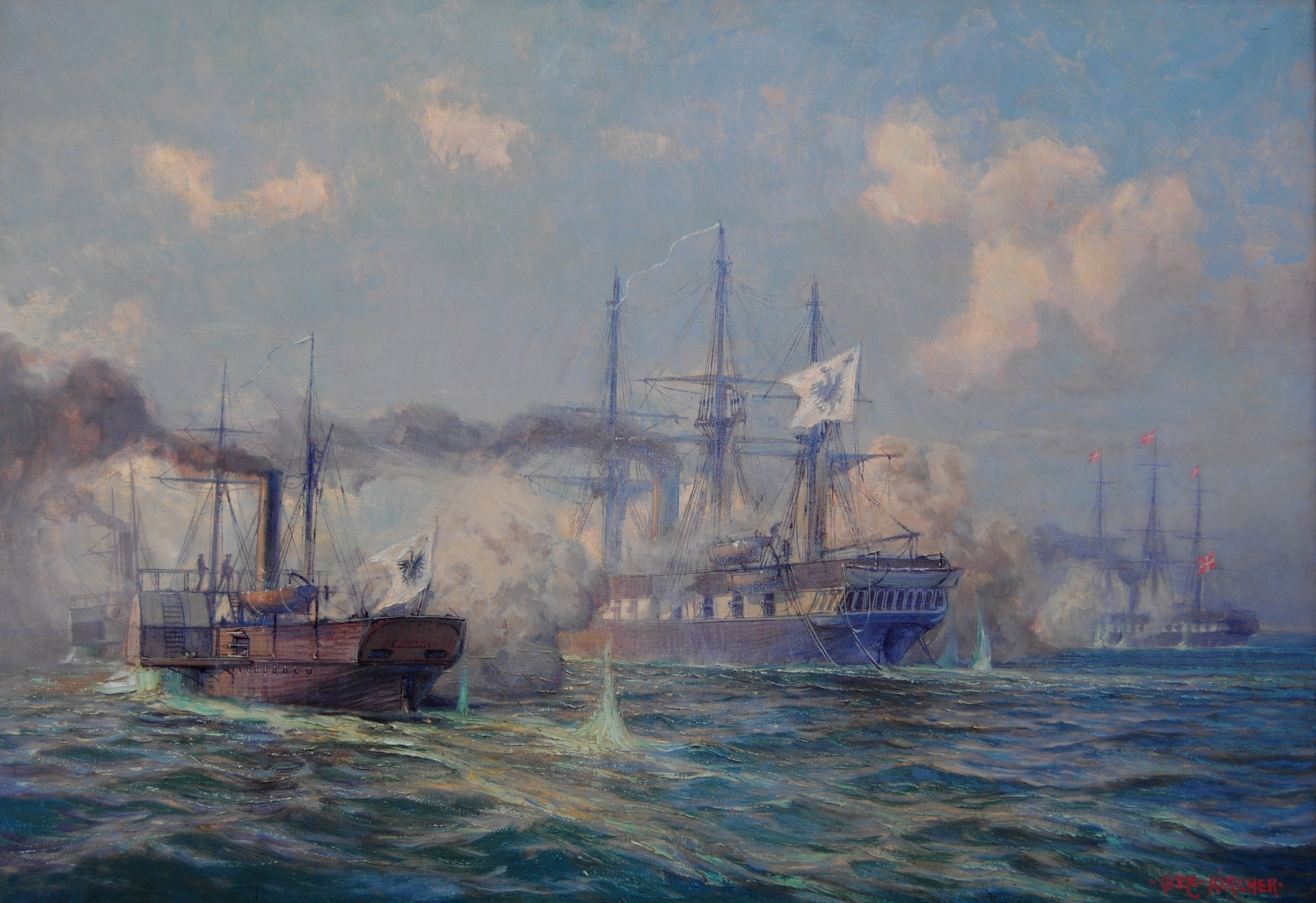
- Sjælland (right) engaging with the paddlewheel steamer Loreley and the corvette Nymphe. Painting by Alex Kircher.
Date	17 March 1864
Location	Off of Rügen, Bay of Pomerania 54°18′N 13°51′E
Result	Tactical Danish victory: Blockade of the Prussian coast maintained

Belligerents
Prussia	Denmark

Commanders and leaders
Eduard von Jachmann	Edvard van Dockum

Strength
2 steam corvettes; 1 paddle steamer; 6 gunboats	1 ship of the line; 1 steam frigate; 2 steam corvettes

Casualties and losses
1 frigate damaged; 5 dead; 8 wounded	6 dead; 16 wounded

The naval Battle of Jasmund (also known as the Battle of Rügen) took place between elements of the Danish and Prussian navies on 17 March 1864 during the Second Schleswig War. The action took place east of the Jasmund peninsula on the Prussian island of Rügen, during a Prussian attempt to weaken the Danish blockade in the Baltic Sea. The Prussian squadron, commanded by Eduard von Jachmann, sortied with a screw frigate, a screw corvette, a paddle steamer, and six gunboats to attack the Danish squadron blockading the eastern Prussian coast. The Danish force was commanded by Edvard van Dockum, and it consisted of one screw frigate, one ship of the line, and two steam corvettes. In an action lasting two hours, the superior Danish squadron forced the Prussians to withdraw, with both sides suffering damage and light casualties. The Danish victory was compounded by the arrival of further warships after the battle, which cemented the blockade. The outcome of the battle, and the naval war in the Baltic as a whole, was irrelevant to the outcome of the war, however, as the Prussian and Austrian armies decisively defeated the Danes on land, forcing them to surrender.

== Background ==
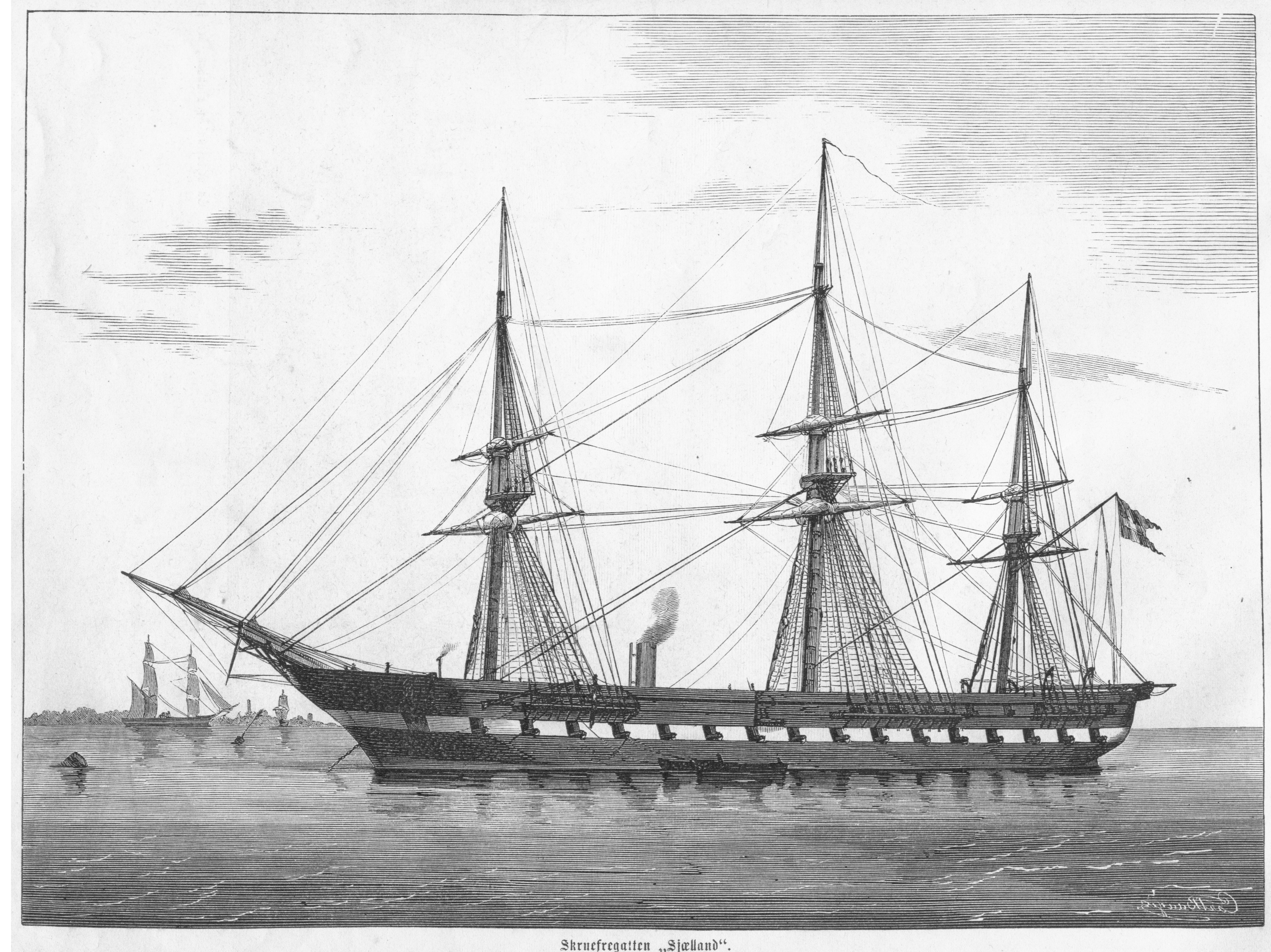
The screw frigate Sjælland, the Danish flagship at Jasmund

In late 1863, as Prussia began to prepare to launch the Second Schleswig War, vessels of the Prussian Navy were relocated. The screw frigate SMS Arcona and the screw corvette Nymphe were transferred from Danzig to Swinemünde, which would allow them to cooperate with the gunboats based in Stralsund. By the time Prussia and the Austrian Empire declared war on 1 February 1864, the ships' crews were still performing maintenance on their engines, and the winter ice had yet to recede far enough to allow offensive operations. The Danish fleet, on the other hand, immediately proclaimed a blockade of the Prussian coast. As most of the Prussian fleet was in the Baltic Sea, the Danes could easily enforce a blockade of the German North Sea ports, allowing most of their fleet to be concentrated in the Baltic. | The Danish fleet in the Baltic, commanded by Rear Admiral Edvard van Dockum, was far superior in size and power to the Prussian fleet and it had no trouble enforcing the blockade. The ship of the line Skjold and five smaller vessels were sent to blockade Swinemünde and Stettin, the ironclad warship Dannebrog and five unarmored ships blockaded Danzig. Several merchant vessels were seized in February and March, prompting Admiral Prince Adalbert of Prussia, the commander of the Prussian Navy, to begin plans for an operation against the blockade, to be led by Captain Eduard von Jachmann, who during the war became the squadron commander in charge of operations.

By mid-March, the Prussian ships were ready for action and the ice had receded far enough that Prince Adalbert ordered Jachmann to conduct a reconnaissance of the blockading force on 16 March. In the meantime, Dockum's squadron had arrived off Swinemünde two days before. Arcona and Nymphe patrolled off Greifswald, but the weather was very poor, with snow showers hampering visibility. The Prussian gunboats, led by the paddle steamer Loreley, remained closer to Swinemünde. Jachmann spotted three vessels at around 15:30, but there was not enough time before dark to catch them. Instead, Jachmann turned back to Swinemünde, intending to try again the following day.

== Battle ==
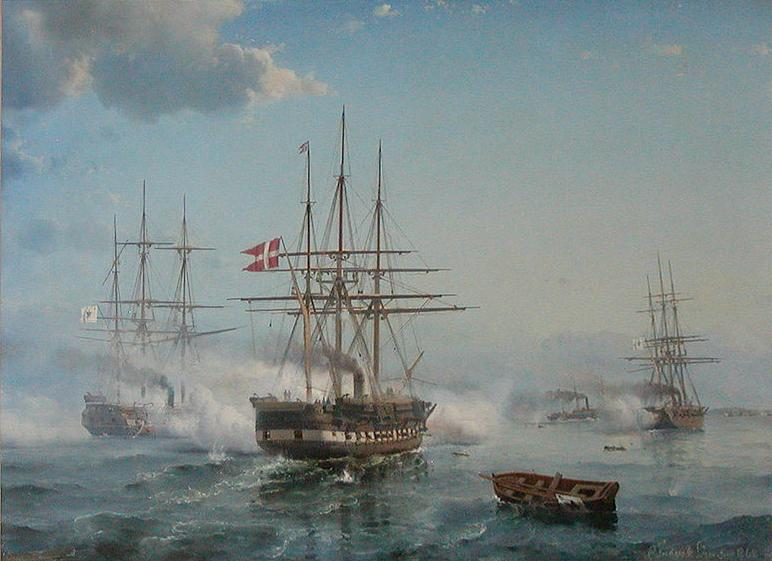
Danish and Prussian warships battling off Swinemünde, by Carl Frederik Sørensen

On the morning of 17 March, Prince Adalbert sent Jachmann's squadron to attack the Danish blockade. The ships sortied from the mouth of the Oder at 07:30 and initially steamed east, but could not locate any Danish warships. They turned west and, as they approached the island of Greifswalder Oie, lookouts aboard the ships spotted smoke to the northwest at about 13:15. The Prussians continued on toward the island of Rügen; off the Jasmund peninsula, Jachmann's ships encountered Dockum's squadron. There, with Arcona and Nymphe in the lead, Jachmann turned to engage the Danes; Loreley increased speed to join the two corvettes while Jachmann sent the gunboats to the coast of Rügen, where they could be used to cover his withdrawal. From further north, Dockum was awaiting the arrival of the steam frigate Tordenskjold.

At 14:30, Arcona opened fire, targeting the frigate Sjælland; a few minutes later, after Sjælland closed to 1,600 yards (1,500 m), Dockum turned his flagship to starboard and began firing broadsides at Arcona. Jachmann turned Arcona to starboard as well, having realized the strength of the Danish squadron. He failed to inform the captains of Nymphe and Loreley of his decision to withdraw, and they continued to steam east for several minutes before they conformed to his maneuver. At this time, Dockum shifted fire to Nymphe and scored several hits, including damage to her funnel that reduced her speed temporarily. Dockum attempted to overtake and cut off Nymphe and Loreley from Arcona, but Nymphe's crew was able to quickly repair the damage she had sustained, allowing her to increase speed, though she continued to take hits.

After 15:00, Tordenskjold arrived from the north and, as she steamed south to join Dockum's squadron, she came under long-range fire from the Prussian gunboats at 15:40. As she continued south, she fired broadsides at the gunboats but otherwise ignored them, with neither side scoring any hits. The gunboats thereafter withdrew, although Hay broke down and required a tow back to Stralsund. In the meantime, Loreley and Nymphe came under heavy fire from the pursuing Danish squadron; at 16:00 Loreley broke off to the west toward Stralsund and Dockum allowed her to leave, preferring to continue after Jachmann's corvettes. Both sides continued to score hits on each other until they checked fire at around 16:45 as the range grew too far. By 18:00, Dockum ended the chase and steamed off to the east, allowing Jachmann to return to Swinemünde.

== Aftermath ==
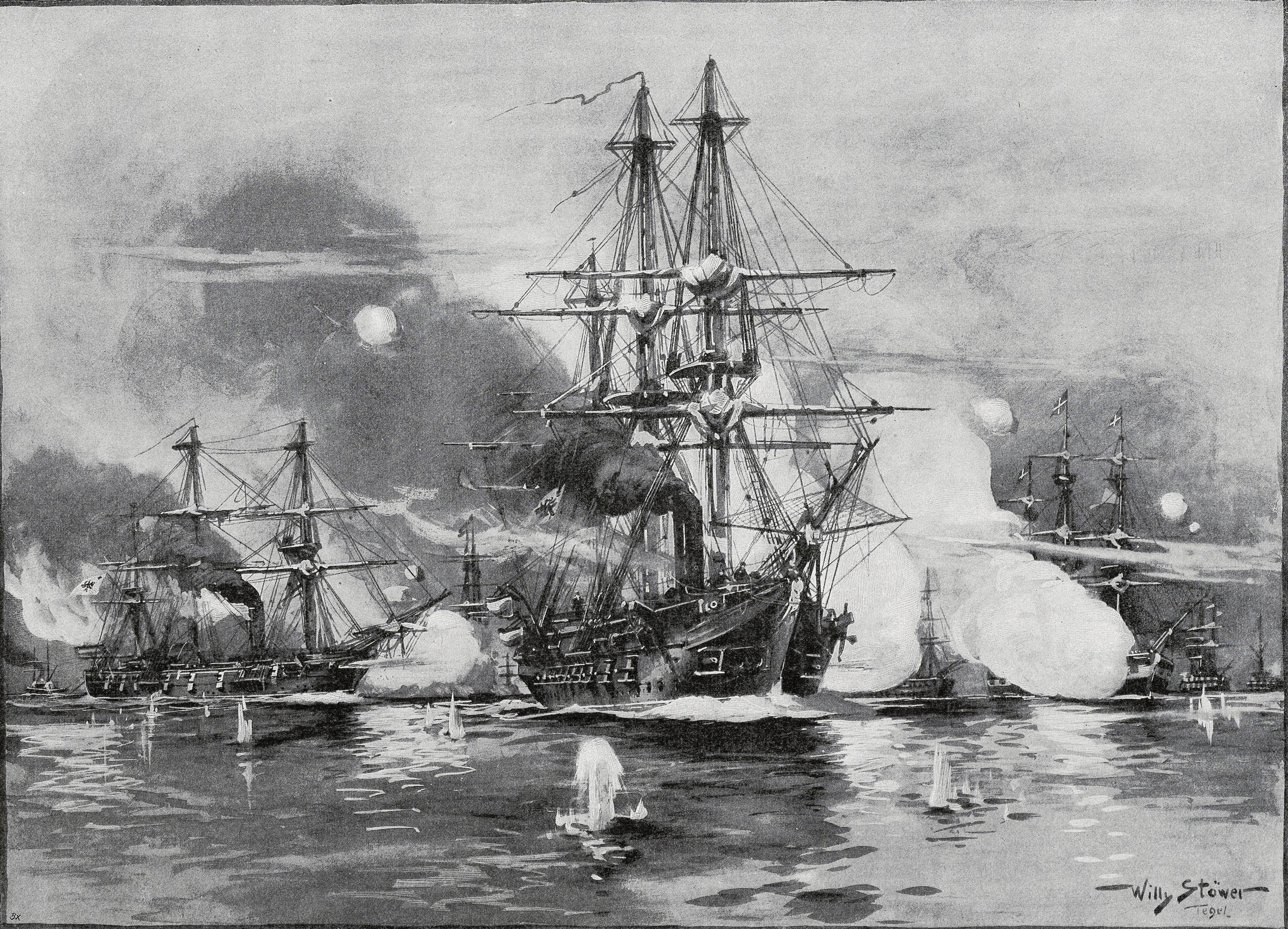
Painting of the battle, depicting the Prussian squadron, by Willy Stöwer

Danish losses were six killed and sixteen wounded, all on the frigate Sjælland. The Prussian ships suffered lighter casualties; three men were killed aboard Arcona, and three more were wounded. Two men were killed and four were injured aboard Nymphe, and just a single man was wounded aboard Loreley. Nymphe was the most damaged vessel of either side, having been hit nineteen times in her hull, four times on her superstructure, and fifty times on her masts and rigging. On the night of 17 March, the screw frigate Jylland joined the Danish blockade force, and she was fast enough to catch Jachmann's corvettes. Danish naval supremacy in the Baltic was further cemented with the arrival on 30 March of Dannebrog, which was impervious to any weapon the Prussians then possessed. As a result, the Prussian fleet remained in port for the remainder of the war; the only events of note were a pair of sorties by the aviso Grille in April, though the Prussian ship did not encounter any Danish vessels on either operation. Jasmund proved to be the only naval action of consequence in the Baltic.

Despite having been forced to flee, Jachmann was promoted to the rank of rear admiral for his actions during the battle. The Prussians made several further patrols in the Baltic, but refused to seek a pitched engagement with the far superior Danish fleet. Instead, the Second Schleswig War was decided on land. Additionally, the arrival of an Austrian squadron in the North Sea allowed the Austrians and Prussians to break the Danish blockade of the North Sea coastal ports at the Battle of Heligoland on 9 May. The Austrians, fearing that a more aggressive operation to defeat the Danish fleet in the Baltic would provoke the British, kept their squadron in the North Sea for the remainder of the war. On 9 May, the two sides signed an armistice in London that took effect three days later, temporarily ending the fighting. The armistice lasted until 26 June, when fighting broke out again on land. The Austrian and Prussian naval forces in the North Sea supported operations to capture the islands off the western Danish coast. These advances, coupled with the capture of the island of Als in the Baltic Sea, forced the Danes to seek a second armistice on 29 June. Ultimately, Denmark sued for peace after it became clear that they had lost naval superiority and that Britain would not intervene in the conflict.

== Order of battle ==
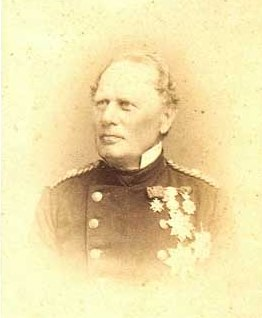
Rear Admiral Edvard van Dockum, the Danish commander

=== Denmark ===
Squadron commander: Rear Admiral Edvard van Dockum

Name	Type	Guns	Speed	Displacement	Crew
Skjold	Ship of the line	50 × 30-pounder smoothbore guns 6 × 18-pounder smoothbore guns 6 × 18-pounder rifled guns	8 knots (15 km/h; 9.2 mph)	2,065 t (2,032 long tons; 2,276 short tons)	Unknown
Sjælland	Screw frigate	30 × 30-pounder guns 8 × 18-pounder rifled guns 4 × 12-pounder smoothbore guns	10 kn (19 km/h; 12 mph)	1,934 t (1,903 long tons; 2,132 short tons)	423
Hejmdal	Screw corvette	14 × 30-pounder smoothbore guns 2 × 18-pounder rifled guns	9.5 kn (17.6 km/h; 10.9 mph)	892 t (878 long tons; 983 short tons)	164
Thor	Screw corvette	10 × 30-pounder smoothbore guns 2 × 18-pounder rifled guns	9 kn (17 km/h; 10 mph)	803 t (790 long tons; 885 short tons)	139

=== Prussia ===
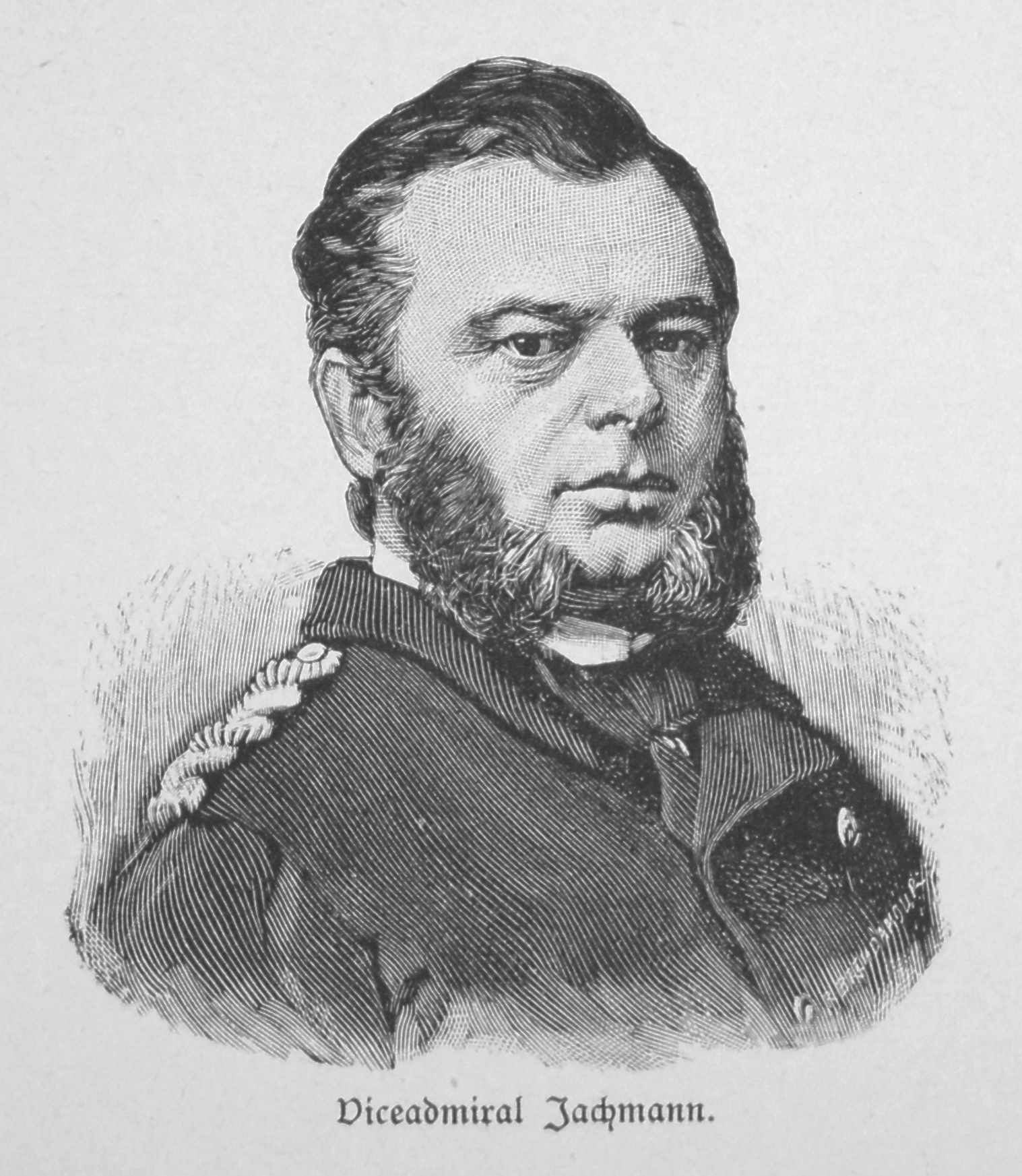
Captain Eduard von Jachmann, the Prussian commander

Squadron commander (commodore): Captain Eduard von Jachmann

Name	Type	Guns	Speed	Displacement	Crew
Arcona	Screw frigate	6 × 68-pounder smoothbore guns 20× 36-pounder guns	12.4 knots (23.0 km/h; 14.3 mph)	2,391 t (2,353 long tons; 2,636 short tons)	380
Nymphe	Screw corvette	10 × 36-pounder smoothbore guns 6 × 12-pounder smoothbore guns	12 kn (22 km/h; 14 mph)	1,202 t (1,183 long tons; 1,325 short tons)	190
Loreley	Paddle steamer	2 × 12-pounder guns	10.5 kn (19.4 km/h; 12.1 mph)	430 t (420 long tons; 470 short tons)	65
Comet	Gunboat	1 × 24-pounder rifled gun 2 × 12-pounder rifled guns	9 kn (17 km/h; 10 mph)	415 t (408 long tons; 457 short tons)	66
Hay	Gunboat	2 × 12-pounder rifled guns	9 kn (17 km/h; 10 mph)	279 t (275 long tons; 308 short tons)	40
Hyäne	Gunboat	2 × 12-pounder rifled guns	9 kn (17 km/h; 10 mph)	279 t (275 long tons; 308 short tons)	40
Pfeil	Gunboat	2 × 12-pounder rifled guns	9 kn (17 km/h; 10 mph)	279 t (275 long tons; 308 short tons)	40
Scorpion	Gunboat	2 × 12-pounder rifled guns	9 kn (17 km/h; 10 mph)	279 t (275 long tons; 308 short tons)	40
Wespe	Gunboat	2 × 12-pounder rifled guns	9 kn (17 km/h; 10 mph)	279 t (275 long tons; 308 short tons)	40
