= HDMS Peter Tordenskjold =

A number of vessels of the Royal Danish Navy have borne the name Peter Tordenskjold, after Peter Tordenskjold.

- HDMS Tordenskjold (1852) , a frigate, in service 1854-1872.
- HDMS Tordenskjold (1880), a torpedo ram, in service 1882-1908.
- HDMS Peter Tordenskiold (F356), a Niels Juel-class corvette , in service since 1982-2009.
