= SMS Meteor (1865) =

Gunboat of the Prussian and German Imperial Navy

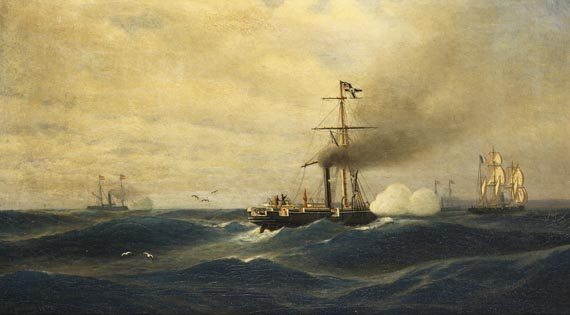
- Painting of Meteor in battle with Bouvet

History
- Name: Meteor
- Operator: Prussian Navy; Imperial German Navy
- Builder: Königliche Werft, Danzig
- Laid down: 27 June 1861
- Launched: 17 May 1865
- Commissioned: 6 September 1869
- Decommissioned: 16 June 1877
- Stricken: 27 November 1877
- Fate: Sunk as a target

General characteristics
- Class & type: Camäleon-class gunboat
- Displacement: 422 t (415 long tons)
- Length: 43.28 m (142 ft)
- Beam: 6.96 m (22 ft 10 in)
- Draft: 2.67 m (8 ft 9 in)
- Installed power: 250 to 320 PS (250 to 320 ihp)
- Propulsion: 1 × marine steam engine
- Speed: 9.1 to 9.3 kn (16.9 to 17.2 km/h; 10.5 to 10.7 mph)
- Complement: 71
- Armament: 1 × 15 cm (5.9 in) gun; 2 × 12 cm (4.7 in) guns

SMS Meteor was a Camäleon-class steam gunboat of the North German Federal Navy (later the Imperial German Navy) that was launched in 1865. The ship was ordered as part of a program to strengthen Prussia's coastal defense forces, then oriented against neighboring Denmark. A small vessel, armed with a battery of only three light guns, Meteor took part in the Battle of Havana in 1870 during the Franco-Prussian War. There, she battled the French aviso Bouvet; both vessels were lightly damaged, though Bouvet was compelled to disengage after a shot from Meteor disabled her engine. After the war, Meteor returned to Germany, where her career was limited; she served briefly as a survey vessel. From 1873 to 1877, she was deployed to the Mediterranean Sea as a station ship in Constantinople during a period of tensions in the Ottoman Empire. After returning to Germany in 1877, she was decommissioned, converted into a coal hulk and expended as a target ship some time later.

== Design ==
The Camäleon class came about as a result of a program to strengthen the Prussian Navy in the late 1850s in the aftermath of the dissolution of the Reichsflotte and in the midst of rising tensions with Denmark. In 1859, Prince Regent Wilhelm approved a construction program for some fifty-two steam gunboats to be built over the next fifteen years, of which eight became the Camäleon class. They were similar to the contemporaneous Jäger-class gunboats, but were substantially larger vessels. These ships were intended to defend the Prussian coast in the event of another war with Denmark.

Meteor was 43.28 meters (142 ft) long, with a beam of 6.96 m (22 ft 10 in) and a draft of 2.67 m (8 ft 9 in). She displaced 422 metric tons (415 long tons) at full load. The ship's crew consisted of 4 officers and 67 enlisted men. She was powered by a single marine steam engine that drove one 3-bladed screw propeller, with steam provided by two coal-fired trunk boilers, which gave her a top speed of 9.3 knots (17.2 km/h; 10.7 mph) at 320 metric horsepower (320 ihp). As built, she was equipped with a three-masted schooner rig. The ship was armed with a battery of one rifled 15 cm (5.9 in) 24-pounder gun and two rifled 12 cm (4.7 in) 12-pounder guns.

== Service history ==
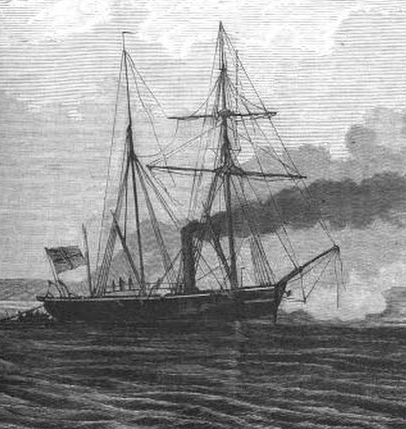
Illustration of Meteor

Meteor was laid down at the Königliche Werft Danzig (Royal Dockyard Danzig) on 27 June 1861. Construction work on the ship was delayed significantly due to a lack of funding, the result of budgetary conflicts between Minister President Otto von Bismarck and the Prussian House of Representatives. The ship was launched on 17 May 1865, though fitting-out work was delayed the following year when the ship was allocated to an expedition to the North Pole. The ship was finally commissioned into service with the North German Federal Navy on 6 September 1869. The Admiralstab (Admiralty Staff) ordered the gunboat to the Caribbean, along with the frigate Arcona. The sailors were concerned with Meteor's seaworthiness for an Atlantic crossing, and so planned to transfer the 15 cm gun to Arcona for the voyage. Arcona was instead reassigned to represent Germany at the opening of the Suez Canal, and so Meteor was forced to make the journey on her own. She departed Kiel on 4 October, under the command of then-Kapitänleutnant (Captain Lieutenant) Eduard von Knorr. En route, she had to put into Falmouth from 12 October to 6 November to repair damage sustained during a storm in the North Sea.

Meteor arrived in Bridgetown, Barbados, on 19 December 1869, and met the training ship Niobe. The gunboat was unable to stay in Barbados, as unrest in Venezuela threatened German nationals in the country, and she was ordered there to protect them. She remained in the area until mid-March 1870; at the beginning of the month, she anchored off La Guaira with Niobe in an attempt to enforce German financial claims in the city. During the period she operated off Venezuela, Meteor left once for periodic repairs at Willemstad, Curacao. On 16 March, she departed Venezuelan waters, bound for Port-au-Prince, Haiti, where she was to meet Arcona. On the way, Meteor struck a coral reef off Gonâve Island, though she was able to get off on her own power. After arriving in Port-au-Prince, Knorr learned that Arcona had gone to La Guaira, and he was to take his vessel there as well. On 19 July, France declared war on Prussia, initiating the Franco-Prussian War.

=== Battle of Havana ===
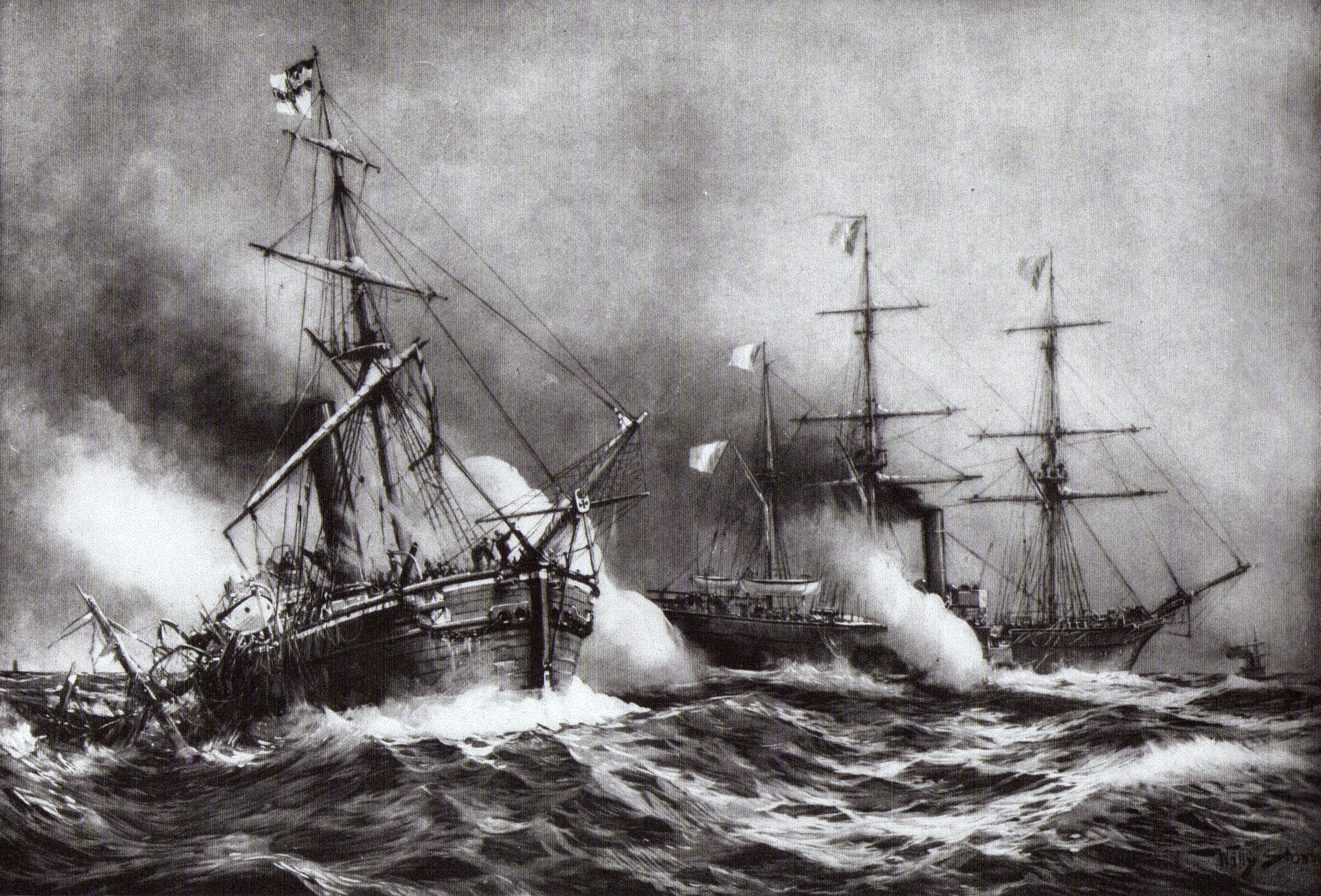
Painting of the Battle of Havana by Willy Stöwer

On 7 November 1870, Meteor arrived in Havana, Cuba, where the French aviso Bouvet was docked. The French ship was more heavily armed than the Prussian vessel, with one 16 cm (6.3 in) gun and four 12 cm guns compared to a single 15 cm gun and two 12 cm guns aboard Meteor. The French captain issued a challenge to Knorr, who accepted. Bouvet departed the harbor on 8 November, followed by Meteor the following day; international law mandated that belligerent ships wait twenty-four hours after an enemy vessel left port. The Battle of Havana lasted for two hours, Meteor opening fire first with her 15 cm gun.

Meteor fired eight salvos at about 2,000 meters (6,600 ft), all without effect, before Bouvet returned fire, once the range had fallen to 800 meters (2,600 ft). Neither ship scored hits as they circled each other. The engagement ended after Bouvet rammed Meteor in an attempt to either sink her or permit a boarding party to capture her. The collision knocked Meteor's main mast and mizzen-mast over, and the ship's rigging got caught in the propeller, disabling it. While the two ships were close, their crews fired on each other with small arms. Bouvet attempted to ram a second time, but Meteor's gunners scored a hit on the French ship's boiler and disabled her engine. By this time, Meteor's crew had freed the propeller, and Knorr attempted to capture Bouvet, but the French sailors were able to get their ship under sail and escape to neutral Cuban waters. The Spanish frigate Cortés, which had been observing the battle, intervened and fired a warning shot to prevent Meteor from continuing the battle. After she escaped, Bouvet sailed to Havana.

Casualty figures vary, ranging from two dead and one injury aboard Meteor and three wounded aboard Bouvet to only two Prussian sailors killed with ten killed and wounded on Bouvet. Meteor joined Bouvet in Havana, where the wounded men were taken to a hospital. The two dead aboard Meteor were buried in Havana, and a monument was later erected there. On 1 January 1871, Knorr was promoted to the rank of Korvettenkapitän (Corvette Captain), and two men were awarded the Iron Cross.

=== Later career ===
Under pressure from France, the Spanish shipyard in Havana delayed completing the repairs to Meteor until the war ended on 10 May 1871. Three days later, the ship departed for Germany; she sailed up the eastern coast of the United States and Canada before crossing the Atlantic. She reached Plymouth on 13 June and arrived in Kiel on the 25th. There, she was decommissioned on 20 July. From 18 September to 14 October, she was used as a stationary training ship for engine room personnel. On 6 May 1872, Meteor was recommissioned for survey work and was assigned to the Hydrographics Office of the Imperial Admiralty Meteor and her sister ship Drache surveyed the German coast, ending in Mecklenburg on 20 October. On 14 November, Meteor and the gunboat Salamander were forced to take shelter in Friedrichsort due to a heavy storm. She was able to get back underway two days later after the storm had passed. Meteor, Drache, and the transport ship Rhein searched the eastern Baltic for any merchant ships that might have been damaged in the storm. On 7 December, Meteor was again decommissioned, this time in Wilhelmshaven.

In 1873, the ship was recommissioned for another stint with the Hydrographics Office, which lasted from 16 April to mid-September. On 22 September, Meteor left Germany for a deployment to the Mediterranean Sea. After reaching the Mediterranean coast of Spain, she replaced the gunboat Delphin in the Cruiser Squadron under the flagship Friedrich Carl. Following the outbreak of unrest in the Ottoman Empire in March 1874, Meteor was sent to Constantinople to serve as the station ship. As tensions rose in the Balkans—which produced several uprisings against Ottoman rule, culminating in the Russo-Turkish War of 1877—Meteor was reinforced with the gunboats Nautilus and Comet and the aviso Pommerania. The Admiralty also sent the Armored Squadron, led by the flagship Kaiser, to the eastern Mediterranean. Meteor remained in Smyrna until February 1877, at which point she returned to Constantinople. From there, she was recalled to Germany on 3 June; she arrived in Kiel on 4 August and continued to Danzig, where she was decommissioned on the 16th. She was stricken from the naval register on 27 November 1877, her engines were removed, and she was used as a hulk for coal storage at Kiel. Some components from her machinery were reused in the gunboat Iltis then being built in Danzig. Meteor was eventually expended as a target.
