= SMS Wolf (1878) =

Lead ship of the Wolf class of gunboats

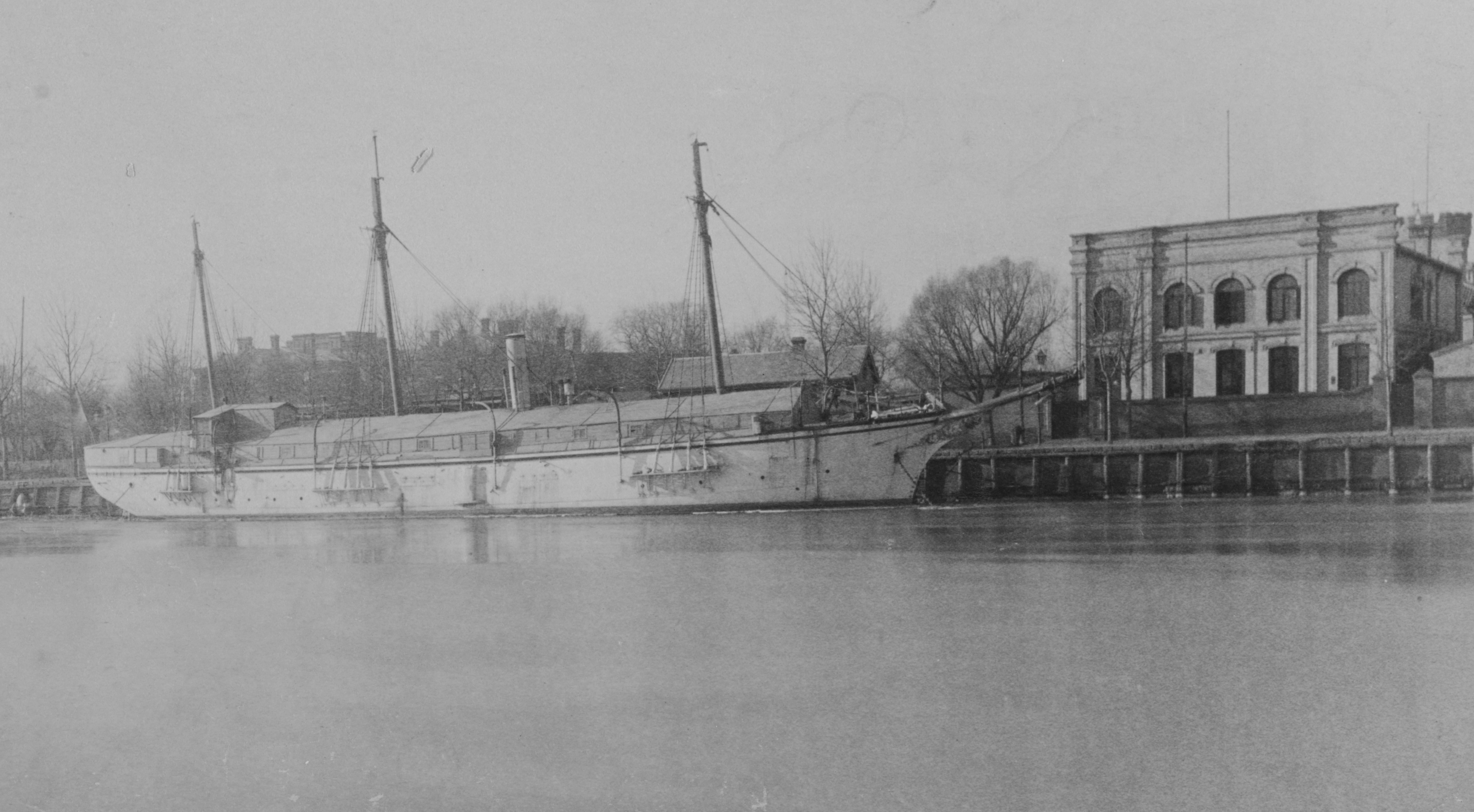
- Wolf laid up in Tientsin, China, probably for the winter of 1880–1881

History
- Name: Wolf
- Operator: Imperial German Navy
- Ordered: September 1876
- Builder: Kaiserliche Werft, Wilhelmshaven
- Laid down: 1876
- Launched: 21 March 1878
- Commissioned: 1 October 1878
- Decommissioned: 18 July 1905
- Stricken: 3 March 1906
- Fate: Sold for scrapping, 24 April 1919

General characteristics
- Class & type: Wolf-class gunboat
- Displacement: 570 t (560 long tons)
- Length: 47.2 m (154 ft 10 in)
- Beam: 7.66 m (25 ft 2 in)
- Draft: 3.1 m (10 ft 2 in)
- Installed power: 2 × fire tube boilers; 340 PS (340 ihp)
- Propulsion: 1 × marine steam engine; 1 × screw propeller
- Speed: 8.5 knots (15.7 km/h; 9.8 mph)
- Range: 1,640 nmi (3,040 km; 1,890 mi) at 9 kn (17 km/h; 10 mph)
- Complement: 5 officers; 80 enlisted men
- Armament: 2 × 12.5 cm (4.9 in) gun; 2 × 8.7 cm (3.4 in) guns; 3 × 37 mm (1.5 in) Hotchkiss revolver cannon

SMS Wolf was the lead ship of the Wolf class of steam gunboats built for the German Kaiserliche Marine (Imperial Navy) in the 1870s. The ship was ordered as part of a construction program intended to begin replacing the old Jäger-class gunboats that had been built a decade earlier. Unlike the older ships, Wolf was intended to serve abroad to protect German economic interests overseas. The ship was armed with a battery of two medium-caliber guns and five lighter weapons, and had a top speed of 8.5 knots (15.7 km/h; 9.8 mph).

Wolf spent nearly her entire career in active service on foreign stations over the course of three cruises abroad; she returned to Germany only for overhauls and modifications. The first voyage, from 1878 to 1884, took the ship to East Asia, primarily off the coast of China. On the way home, she was involved in the establishment of the colony of German South West Africa. The next cruise, which lasted from 1886 to 1895, initially returned to East Asian waters, but she spent most of her time abroad in the South Pacific. In 1889, she carried the exiled King of Samoa, Malietoa Laupepa, back to the islands, where he was reinstated as king. In 1891, she rescued survivors from the wrecked Ottoman frigate Ertuğrul.

After returning to Germany in 1895, Wolf was converted into a survey ship, and in this capacity, she was sent to map Germany's colonies in Africa. She operated off the coast of Kamerun and German South West Africa until 1905. Throughout this period, the ship was also used for other tasks, including assisting the colonial Schutztruppe suppress unrest. The ship was struck from the naval register in 1906, converted into a repair ship, and used in that capacity through World War I. In the post-war draw-down of German naval strength in 1919, she was sold to ship breakers and broken up for scrap.

== Design ==
German economic activity in Qing China in the 1870s faced significant threats from piracy and resistance from local officials, so the German Kaiserliche Marine (Imperial Navy) stationed warships in East Asia to protect its trade interests. At the same time, the old Jäger-class gunboats that had been ordered in 1859 needed to be replaced. The two Albatross-class gunboats and the rebuilt Cyclop were too few for the task of patrolling the Far East, so another three vessels were ordered according to the fleet plan that had been approved in 1872. The design for the new ships was completed in 1876, and it called for reusing the engines from three of the Camäleon-class gunboats that had also been ordered in the 1859 plan. These three ships became the Wolf-class gunboats. They were to be used extensively abroad to support the fleet's larger cruising screw corvettes and screw frigates.

Wolf was 47.2 meters (154 ft 10 in) long overall, with a beam of 7.66 m (25 ft 2 in) and a draft of 3.1 m (10 ft 2 in). She displaced 490 metric tons (480 long tons) as designed and 570 t (560 long tons) at full load. The ship's crew consisted of 5 officers and 80 enlisted men. She was powered by a marine steam engine that drove a 2-bladed screw propeller, with steam provided by two coal-fired trunk fire-tube boilers. The engine was taken from the old gunboat Blitz. Her propulsion system was rated to produce a top speed of 8.5 knots (15.7 km/h; 9.8 mph) at 340 metric horsepower (340 ihp), but she reached 9.4 knots (17.4 km/h; 10.8 mph) in service. At a cruising speed of 9 knots (17 km/h; 10 mph), she could steam for 1,640 nautical miles (3,040 km; 1,890 mi). To supplement the steam engine on long voyages, the ships were fitted with a barque sailing rig.

The ship was armed with a pair of 12.5 cm (4.9 in) K L/23 built-up guns, which were supplied with a total of 270 rounds of ammunition. She carried an additional pair of 8.7 cm (3.4 in) K L/24 built up guns and three 37 mm (1.5 in) Hotchkiss revolver cannon.

== Service history ==
The contract for Wolf was awarded to the Kaiserliche Werft Wilhelmshaven (Imperial Shipyard) in Wilhelmshaven in September 1876, under the contract name Ersatz Salamander. (Note: German warships were ordered under provisional names. Additions to the fleet were given a single letter; ships intended to replace older or lost vessels were ordered as "Ersatz (name of the ship to be replaced)".) The keel for the new ship was laid down later that year. She was launched on 21 March 1878, and Konteradmiral (Rear Admiral) Gustav Klatt gave a speech at the launching ceremony. The new gunboat was named for an earlier gunboat of the same name that had been built in the 1860s. The ship was commissioned six months later on 1 October. She thereafter began sea trials, but these were cut short by the need to send the ship to Asia immediately.

=== First overseas cruise, 1878–1884 ===
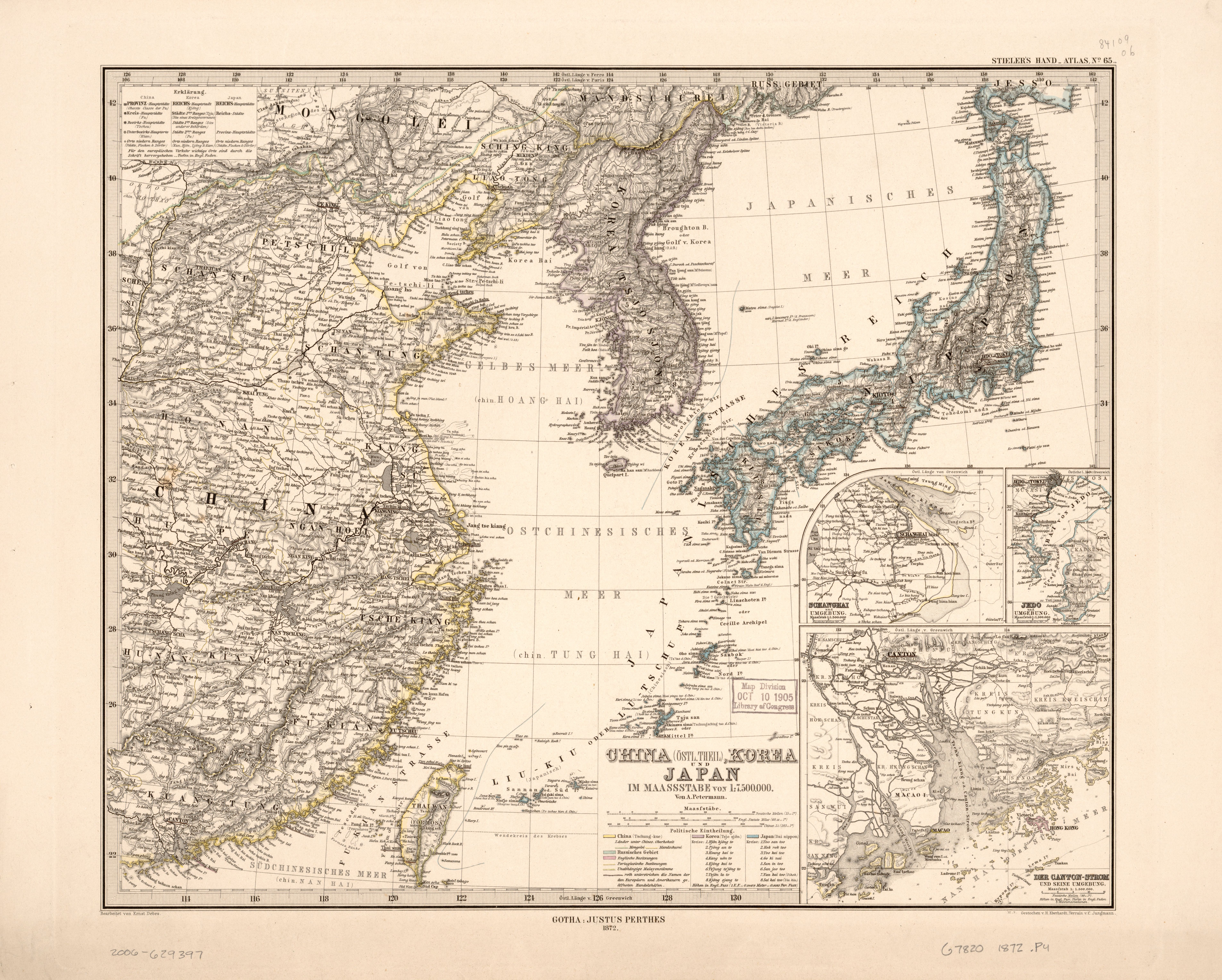
German 1872 map of China, Japan, and Korea

Wolf got underway on 26 October, bound for China, but already on 4 November, she had to stop in Sheerness, Britain, after damaging her screw. Repairs lasted until 11 November, and the following day, the ship's engine broke down, forcing her to stop in Margate for further repairs. The crew's luck improved for the rest of the voyage, and on 2 February 1879, Wolf arrived in Singapore. She thereafter joined the cruiser squadron in East Asia, which was led by the screw corvette Leipzig and included the corvettes Freya and Luise and the gunboat Cyclop. Wolf initially visited Hong Kong, Guangzhou, Hainan Island, and Beihai, along the south China coast. She then sailed south to visit Annam before returning north to Hong Kong on 1 May. Wolf thereafter sailed on 12 May to visit northern waters, which included a stop in Yokohama, Japan, on 1 July. There she met the corvette Prinz Adalbert, which had relieved Leipzig as the squadron flagship. Wolf got underway again on 22 July and returned to the coast of China. She cruised in the Yellow and Bohai Seas, visiting many ports in the region, including Shanghai. On 30 November, she anchored in Yantai, China, where she spent the winter months.

In early 1880, tensions between Japan and China threatened to erupt into war, which prompted the German vessels in the region to assemble at the mouth of the Yangtze River to await developments. Wolf embarked Kapitän zur See (Captain at Sea) Archibald MacLean, the commander of Prinz Adalbert, along with Prince Heinrich (who was serving as a watch officer aboard Prinz Adalbert), to Shanghai and back. By 10 May, the crisis had been defused, allowing the German ships to disperse; that day, Wolf got underway to visit other ports in the region. Kapitänleutnant (KL—Captain Lieutenant) Johannes Strauch took command of the ship. In late October, the ship sailed up the Hai River to stop in Tianjin, for another period of inactivity during the winter months. The crew took down the ship's rigging for storage ashore, and an upper deck structure was erected to protect the ship. In January 1881, the cruiser squadron was reorganized and renamed the East Asia Cruiser Squadron, which was now led by the corvette Stosch. Over the course of the year, Wolf toured many ports in the region, including a stay at Guangzhou from 26 November to 6 January 1882. She stopped in Incheon, Korea, from 16 June to 10 July, in company with Stosch while Max von Brandt negotiated a trade agreement between Germany and Korea.

For the rest of 1882, Wolf cruised throughout the region, at times with other members of the squadron. On 15 November, she arrived back in Tianjin for the winter. She joined the rest of the squadron on 7 March 1883 to cruise through the Sulu Archipelago. The rest of the year passed as usual, with tours of the region. She spent the winter of 1883–1884 in Guangzhou. The gunboat Nautilus arrived in Guangzhou on 11 April to relieve Wolf, allowing her to return home. Her departure was delayed by the outbreak of riots against Europeans at Swatow, as she was sent to protect foreigners in the city. The situation had calmed by late May, and on 30 May, Wolf sailed for home. She crossed the Indian Ocean to Cape Town, South Africa, where she received orders to proceed to the coast of southwest Africa to join Leipzig and the screw frigate Elisabeth in early August. Wolf anchored in Lüderitz Bay from 8 to 10 August. There, the Germans established the colony of German South West Africa. Wolf embarked Adolf Lüderitz and a geologist to survey the coast as far north as Sandwich Harbor and the mouth of the Swakop River. Wolf then took part in flag-raising ceremonies at Walvis Bay, Cape Cross, and other locations. After returning to Lüderitz Bay, she sailed for Germany and arrived in Wilhelmshaven on 19 October. The ship was decommissioned there on the 30th for a major overhaul that included a modernization of her machinery, sailing rig, and armament.

=== Second overseas cruise, 1886–1895 ===
Wolf was recommissioned on 8 April 1886, under the command of KL Paul Jaeschke, to replace her sister ship Iltis in East Asia. She sailed from Wilhelmshaven on 18 April and by early July, had reached the island of Purim in the Red Sea. There, she stopped to try to find wreckage from the screw corvette Augusta, which had sunk in a storm in the area the previous year. After failing to locate any debris, she continued on, arriving in Singapore on 6 July. Wolf joined the rest of the squadron—which at that time also included the screw corvettes and Bismarck and Olga and Nautilus—in Hong Kong on 21 July. Wolf thereafter embarked on cruises around the area to show the flag; she had to stop in Amoy for repairs from 25 August to 7 October. As in previous years, she wintered at Guangzhou from 24 December to 23 February, after which she returned to Hong Kong for an overhaul that lasted until 29 March. In early August, the ship cruised in the Bohai Sea, where many of her crew contracted cholera, which had broken out in the area.

The ship spent the winter of 1887–1888 in Hyōgo-ku, Japan, anchoring there on 21 December. She departed on 12 March 1888 and sailed for Singapore, where she underwent repairs from 26 April to 20 June. By this time, cholera had spread to the southern Chinese ports, so Wolf sailed to northern China in an attempt to avoid the disease. But while in Yantai, one member of the crew died from cholera. In September, KL Ernst Credner took command of the ship. By October, Wolf had moved to Taipei on the island of Formosa, where unrest had broken out, though the Germans did not need to intervene in the city. At the end of the year, she once again returned to Guangzhou for the winter months. Wolf left Guangzhou earlier than normal, and on 31 January 1889, she began a voyage through the Dutch East Indies. While in Surabaya on 3 April, the ship received orders to sail for Samoa; Olga and the gunboats Eber and Adler had been anchored in Apia when a major tropical cyclone struck the island. The gunboats were both wrecked and Olga was grounded. Wolf arrived in Apia on 14 June, and at the end of the month, she received orders to sail to Jaluit, where she was to embark Malietoa Laupepa, who was the exiled former ruler of Samoa, and return him to rule the islands. The ship arrived in Jaluit on 28 June; on the way back to Samoa, Laupepa attempted to commit suicide, because he believed he was being taken to prison. Upon the ship's arrival in Apia, Laupepa was greeted by the German consul, Oscar Stübel. The Germans, Americans, and British agreed to install Laupepa as ruler in place of Mataʻafa Iosefo, who had deposed Laupepa during the Samoan Civil War the previous year.

Wolf sailed for the Marshall Islands on 26 August in response to reports on attacks on a German trader there. Her landing party arrested eight individuals and took them to Jaluit for trial. The Germans then visited other islands in the Marshalls to mediate disputes between rival groups. By the end of October, the ship had returned to Apia, where she received orders to return to China. While en route, Wolf encountered a severe typhoon that partially dismasted the ship. She eventually arrived in Nagasaki, Japan, on 17 November, where she underwent repairs that lasted into March 1890. Wolf thereafter cruised with the rest of the cruiser squadron in East Asian waters. While she was in Kobe, Japan, on 16 September, Wolf's crew learned that a ship had been wrecked off Kii Ōshima. She sailed to render assistance to the shipwrecked sailors. On her arrival on 21 September, she found the wreck of the Ottoman paddle frigate Ertuğrul. Wolf was able to rescue 65 survivors out of a crew of 571 men. She then took them back to Kobe.

The year 1891 passed largely uneventfully, with the exception of the period from May to September, when Wolf stayed at Formosa during a period of civil unrest that saw several Europeans murdered. On 29 October, she anchored at Hankou, where she remained until 25 February 1892. During that period, two members of her crew died from typhus. The ship thereafter patrolled the region, at times sailing alone and at times with other members of the cruiser squadron. The squadron was disbanded in March 1893; most of the ships were sent elsewhere, leaving Wolf alone with Iltis to protect German interests in East Asia. In early July, Wolf sailed to Bangkok, Siam, in response to rising tensions between that country and France, which soon ruptured into the 1893 Franco-Siamese crisis. After arriving on 23 July, Wolf, the British gunboat HMS Linnet and the Dutch gunboat Simbawa sent landing parties ashore to protect their nationals in the city. The French imposed a blockade during the conflict, but no attacks on Europeans materialized, allowing Wolf to return to China on 30 August. In late December, she anchored at Hyōgo-ku again. In early 1894, she returned to the Chinese coast, where the crew again had to take precautions against cholera.

The First Sino-Japanese War broke out in July, and from 13 to 15 August, Wolf carried Germans living in Seoul, Korea, to Yantai. The situation led to the creation of the East Asia Division, led by the corvette Arcona. By that time, Wolf and Iltis were in poor condition after years abroad; the squadron commander, Konteradmiral Paul Hoffmann, proposed restricting the ships to river operations. Instead, the Reichsmarineamt (Imperial Naval Office) ordered Wolf to return home. Renewed unrest in Formosa prompted the naval command to divert the ship to Tamsui in May. On 30 May, she resumed her voyage home, passing through the Suez Canal and arriving in Wilhelmshaven on 14 September. She was then moved to Danzig, where she was decommissioned on 27 September for an extensive overhaul.

=== Third overseas cruise, 1897–1905 ===
The naval command initially planned on sending Wolf back to East Asia after completing the overhaul, but decided instead to convert her into a survey ship. A new upper deck was installed, along with a conning tower. Wolf was recommissioned on 1 October 1897 to replace her sister Hyäne in Germany's West African colony of Kamerun. The ship, under the command of KL Johannes Schröder, departed Wilhelmshaven on 28 October and arrived in Douala, Kamerun, on 25 December. The ship began conducting surveys of the area in January 1898, continuing on the work that had been begun by Hyäne and Cyclop. She also surveyed the coast of German Southwest Africa during her time in western Africa. The ship's crew had to be replaced every year due to the climate, and in November, a Woermann-Linie steamship brought a replacement crew for the ship. After three months of training the new crew, the Germans began survey work. Over the course of the ship's time in west African waters, she would take on 20 to 30 local men to serve as assistant sailors and boiler room personnel. Survey work had to be suspended during the wet season, and Wolf would sail south for a refit, usually at Cape Town, but sometimes at Luanda, Portuguese Angola.

Surveying activities in 1898 were interrupted in February when the governor, Theodor Seitz, ordered the ship to carry a force of police from Douala to Buea to suppress unrest. Wolf underwent an overhaul in Cape Town from April to the end of May. While on the way back north, she stopped in Luanda, where she joined the gunboat Habicht; the two ships sailed together to Swakopmund, German Southwest Africa. The ships remained there for a few months to support the local Schutztruppe in operations against the local Herero people. On 21 October, the two ships continued on north to Kamerun. The years 1899 and 1900 passed largely uneventfully, apart from a change of command from Schröder to KL Eugen Weber in February 1899 and an overhaul in Cape Town from 30 June to 8 August 1900. KL Hugo Louran took command of the ship in February 1901. On 7 March, Wolf helped to pull free the Woermann-Linie steamship SS Alexandra Woermann, which had run aground in the Wouri River. Due to the outbreak of the Second Boer War in South Africa, Wolf had her overhaul in Luanda that year. In early October, the ship was present for the opening ceremony of a sanatorium at Souellaba Point. KL Otto Bechtel replaced Louran in November. Wolf returned to Cape Town for an overhaul that lasted from 14 July to 23 August 1902.

The year 1903 passed without events of note, and she once again underwent an overhaul in Cape Town that lasted for seven weeks. On 20 June 1904, she departed Kamerun to visit Swakopmund at the request of the local colonial government; Wolf was needed to transfer a group of fifty-four Hereros from the steamship SS Teck to South Africa, where they had taken jobs. Wolf initially transferred them to a barge in Lüderitz Bay, before taking them to the passenger steamer SS Emilie Woermann, which carried them for the rest of their journey. In September, Wolf resumed survey work, but in November, she was sent to Campo, Kamerun, in response to unrest in the city. That month, KL Max Lans took command of the ship; he would be the vessel's final commander. In 1905, the protected cruiser Vineta visited Kamerun, and her commander, Kommodore Ludwig von Schröder came aboard Wolf for a tour of the coast near Douala. Soon thereafter, Wolf was ordered to return home. During her deployment to Kamerun, she had surveyed some 562 km (349 mi) of coastline and taken depth readings covering 3,115 km^{2} (1,203 sq mi). After a brief period of repairs in a floating dry dock owned by the Woermann-Linie, Wolf departed for Germany on 1 May. On the way, she stopped in Fernado Po to make an official visit to the Spanish colonial governor from 2 to 5 May. The ship arrived in Wilhelmshaven on 30 June, and she then continued on to Danzig, where she was decommissioned on 18 July. She remained in reserve for the next half of a year, before being struck from the naval register on 3 March 1906. Wolf was then converted into a repair ship at the Kaiserliche Werft in Danzig, where she was used through the end of World War I in 1918. She was sold to ship breakers in Düsseldorf on 24 April 1919 and thereafter dismantled.
