= Wolf-class gunboat =

Class of German gunboat of the 1870s

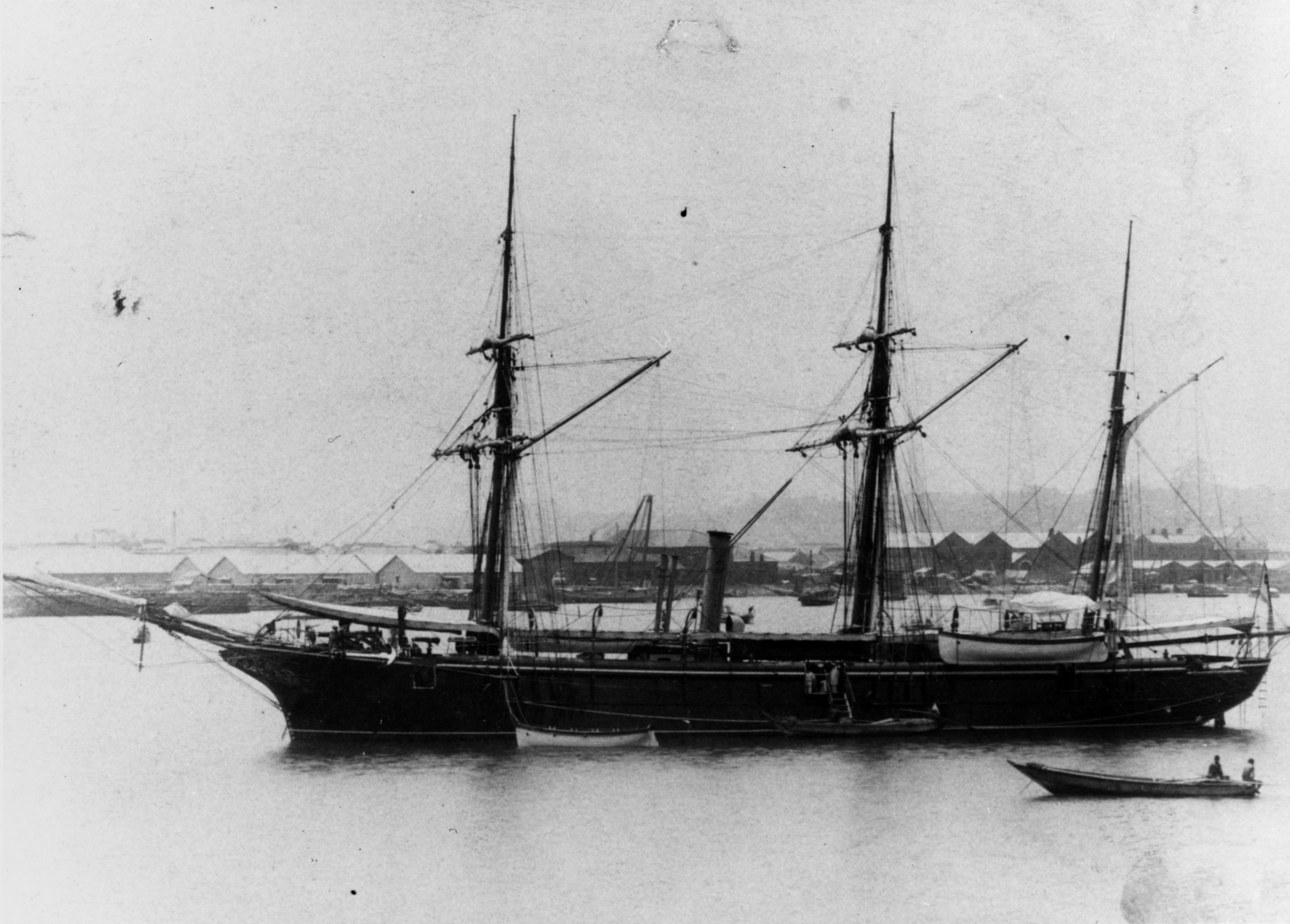
- Iltis in East Asia

Class overview
- Preceded by: SMS Otter
- Succeeded by: Habicht class
- Built: 1876–1880
- In commission: 1878–1920
- Completed: 3
- Lost: 1
- Scrapped: 2

General characteristics
- Type: Steam gunboat
- Displacement: 570 t (560 long tons)
- Length: 47.2 m (154 ft 10 in)
- Beam: 7.66 m (25 ft 2 in)
- Draft: 3.1 m (10 ft 2 in)
- Installed power: 2 × fire tube boilers; 340 PS (340 ihp)
- Propulsion: 1 × marine steam engine; 1 × screw propeller
- Speed: 8.5 knots (15.7 km/h; 9.8 mph)
- Range: 1,640 nmi (3,040 km; 1,890 mi) at 9 kn (17 km/h; 10 mph)
- Complement: 5 officers; 80 enlisted men
- Armament: 2 × 12.5 cm (4.9 in) gun; 2 × 8.7 cm (3.4 in) guns; 3 × 37 mm (1.5 in) Hotchkiss revolver cannon

The Wolf class of steam gunboats comprised three ships: Wolf, Hyäne, and Iltis, which were built for the German Kaiserliche Marine (Imperial Navy) in the 1870s. The ships were ordered as part of a construction program intended to begin replacing the old Jäger-class gunboats that had been built a decade earlier, and to strengthen the fleet's force of cruising vessels as the recently founded German Empire began to expand its commercial activities, particularly in China. Unlike the older ships, the Wolf class was intended to serve abroad to protect German economic interests overseas. They also introduced iron construction to German gunboat designs. The ships were armed with a battery of two medium-caliber guns and five lighter weapons, and had a top speed of 8.5 knots (15.7 km/h; 9.8 mph).

After entering service in the late 1870s, all three ships cruised abroad extensively, frequently in the Pacific Ocean. During these voyages, they were used to protect German interests in China and the South Pacific, including the eventual colonies of German Samoa and German New Guinea. The ships also saw service in African waters, as Germany built a colonial empire in Kamerun, German South West Africa, and German East Africa. Iltis was sunk in a typhoon off China in 1896, but Wolf and Hyäne were both converted into survey ships in the late 1890s. Wolf was used to map Germany's colonies in western Africa, while Hyäne worked in German home waters. Both vessels were eventually discarded in 1919; Wolf was broken up that year, but Hyäne was converted into a merchant vessel, a role she filled until 1924, when she was accidentally destroyed by fire in Dieppe, France.

== Design ==
German economic activity in Qing China in the 1870s faced significant threats from piracy and resistance from local officials, so the German Kaiserliche Marine (Imperial Navy) stationed warships in East Asia to protect its trade interests. At the same time, the old Jäger-class gunboats that had been ordered in 1859 needed to be replaced. The two Albatross-class gunboats and the rebuilt Cyclop were too few for the task of patrolling the Far East, so another three vessels were ordered according to the fleet plan that had been approved in 1872. The design for the new ships was completed in 1876, and it called for reusing the engines from three of the Camäleon-class gunboats that had also been ordered in the 1859 plan. These three ships became the Wolf class.

Unlike the earlier German gunboats, which were entirely of wood construction, the Wolf class would be built with iron. The designers considered copper sheathing for the hulls of the new ships, since the gunboats were intended to serve abroad, and the sheathing would have protected the hulls from marine biofouling. But they ultimately decided against it, fearing that the iron hull and copper plating would cause galvanic corrosion. The three gunboats were nevertheless used extensively abroad to support the fleet's larger cruising screw corvettes and screw frigates.

=== Characteristics ===
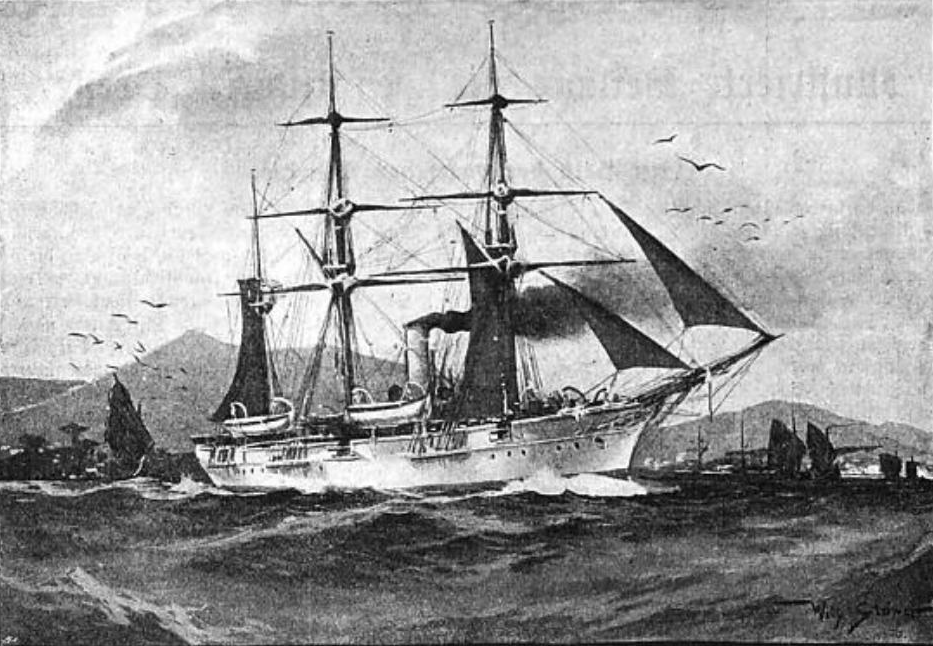
Iltis under way, by Willy Stöwer

The ships of the Wolf class were 44.5 meters (146 ft) long at the waterline and 47.2 m (154 ft 10 in) long overall, with a beam of 7.66 m (25 ft 2 in). They had a draft of 3.1 m (10 ft 2 in) forward, which increased slightly to 3.4 m (11 ft 2 in) aft. They displaced 490 metric tons (480 long tons) as designed and 570 t (560 long tons) at full load. Their hull was constructed with transverse iron frames and timber hull and deck planks, and was divided into six watertight compartments. The ships had a raised forecastle and sterncastle decks, and minimal superstructure.

Steering was controlled by a single rudder. The ships handled and maneuvered well, but pitched and rolled severely. They handled well under sail, but had difficulty making forward progress in a head sea. For Wolf and Iltis, their crew consisted of 5 officers and 80 enlisted men, while Hyäne was manned by 5 officers and 101 enlisted sailors. Each vessel carried a number of small boats, including one pinnace, two cutters, one yawl, and one dinghy.

They were powered by a marine steam engine that drove a 2-bladed screw propeller that was 2.53 m (8 ft 4 in) wide, which could be retracted while the ships were operating under sail. Steam was provided by two coal-fired trunk fire-tube boilers that were vented through a single funnel. The engines were taken from the older Camäleon-class gunboats Blitz, Basilisk, and Delphin. Their propulsion system was rated to produce a top speed of 8.5 knots (15.7 km/h; 9.8 mph) at 340 metric horsepower (340 ihp), but they reached 9.2 to 9.9 knots (17.0 to 18.3 km/h; 10.6 to 11.4 mph) in service. They could store 95 to 112 t (93 to 110 long tons; 105 to 123 short tons) of coal for the boilers. At a cruising speed of 9 knots (17 km/h; 10 mph), they could steam for 1,640 nautical miles (3,040 km; 1,890 mi). To supplement the steam engine on long voyages, the ships were fitted with a barque sailing rig with a total surface area of 541 m^{2} (5,820 sq ft).

The ships were armed with a pair of breech-loading 12.5 cm (4.9 in) K L/23 built-up guns, which were supplied with a total of 270 rounds of ammunition. These guns had a range of 5,200 m (5,700 yd). The Wolf-class ships carried an additional pair of 8.7 cm (3.4 in) K L/24 built up guns, which were supplied with 200 rounds of ammunition. Three 37 mm (1.5 in) Hotchkiss revolver cannon rounded out the armament.

=== Modifications ===
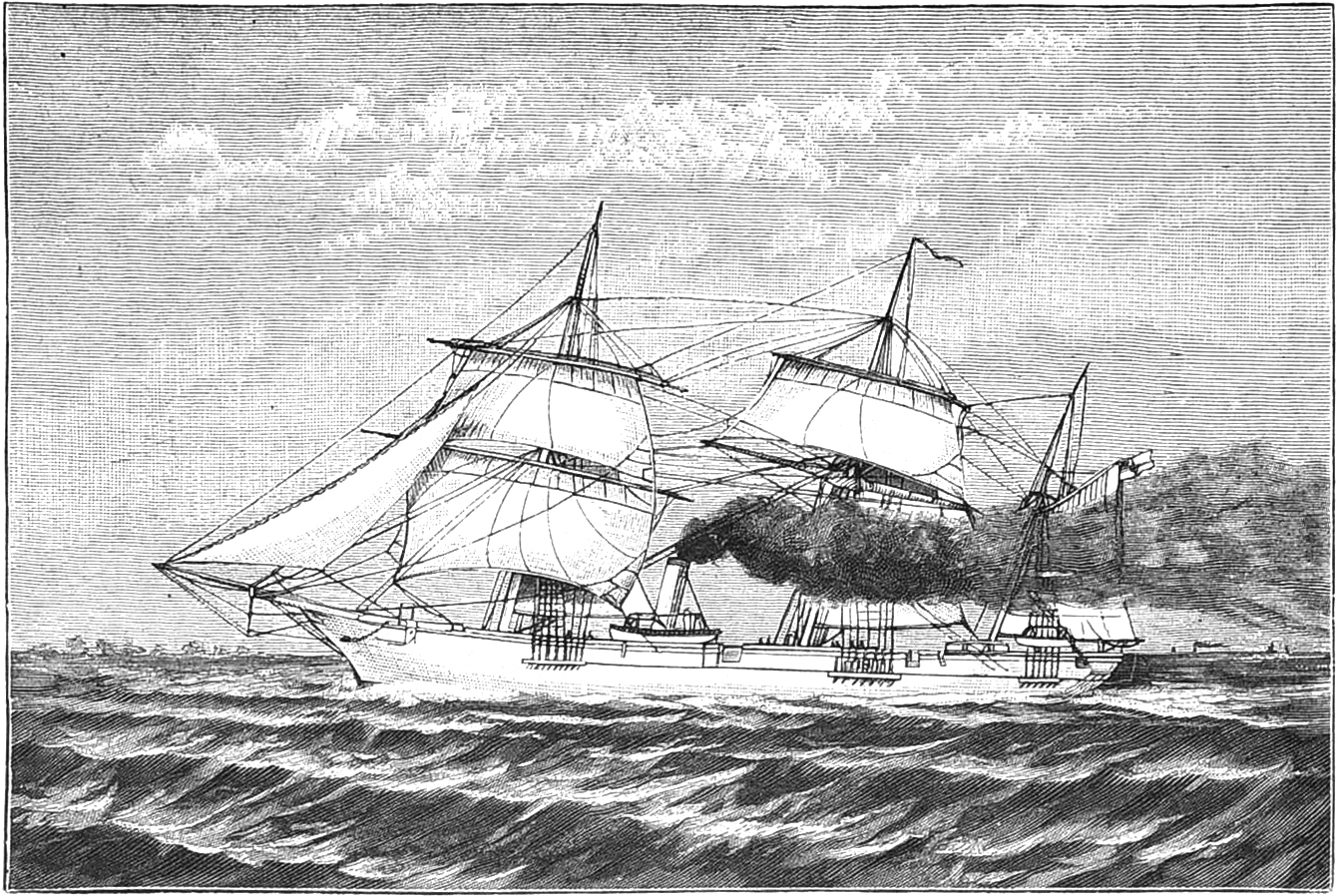
Hyäne underway

Wolf and Hyäne received new boilers in 1885 and 1888, respectively. At some point in their careers, all three ships had their sailing rig cut down to a schooner barque rig, with a total area of 290 m^{2} (3,100 sq ft), and eventually, Hyäne had only auxiliary sails. Wolf was later rearmed, losing both of her 12.5 cm guns and one of the 8.7 cm pieces, with ammunition storage for the remaining gun reduced to 113 shells. One of her Hotchkiss revolvers was also removed. In place of these removed weapons, she received a 5 cm (2 in) SK L/40 quick-firing gun, supplied with 250 rounds of ammunition. In 1897, Hyäne was disarmed altogether.

== Ships ==
Construction data
Ship	Builder	Laid down	Launched	Commissioned
Wolf	Kaiserliche Werft, Wilhelmshaven	1876	21 March 1878	1 October 1878
Hyäne	Kaiserliche Werft, Wilhelmshaven	1876	27 June 1878	7 September 1879
Iltis	Königlich Werft, Danzig	1877	18 September 1878	2 March 1880

== Service history ==
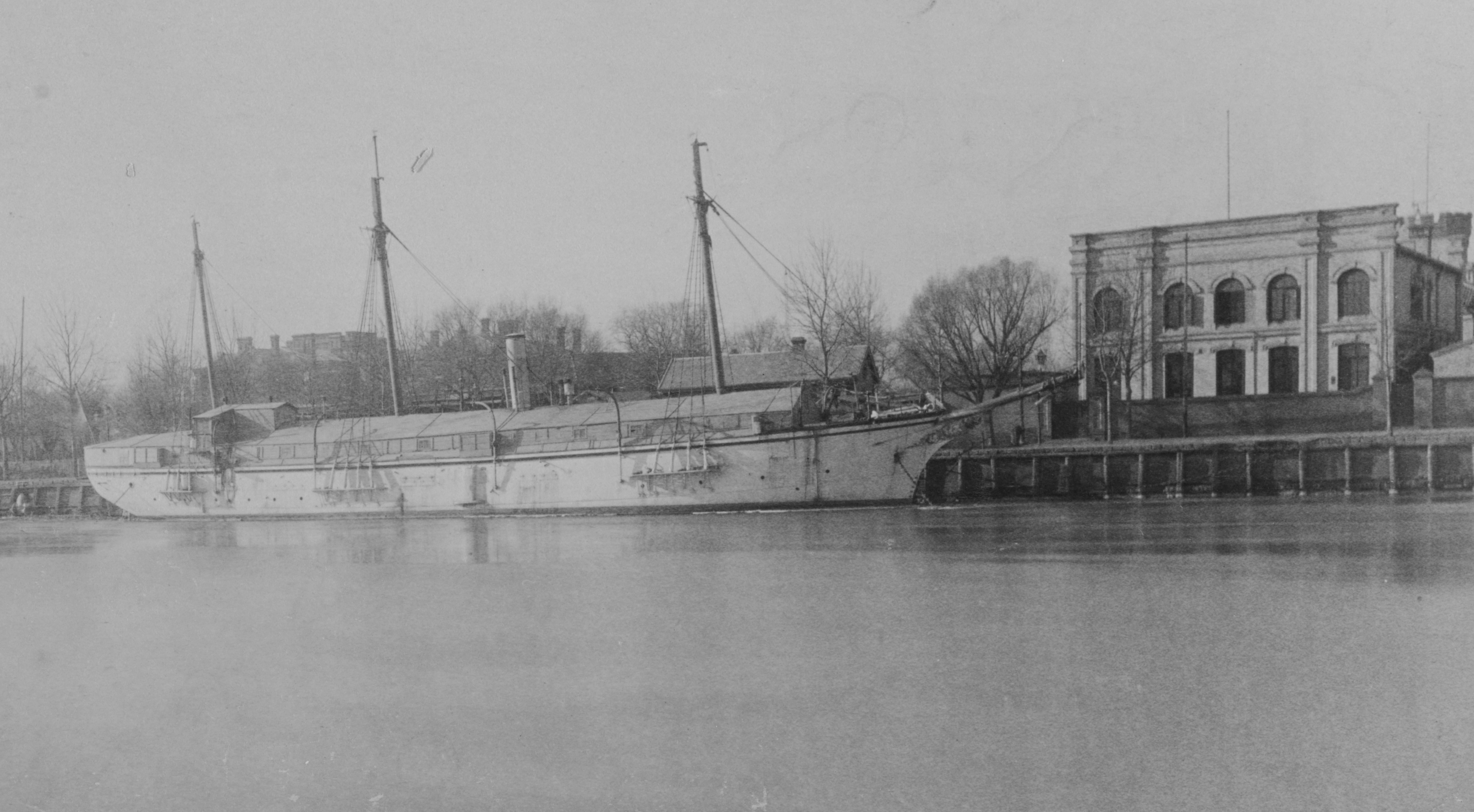
Wolf laid up in Tientsin, China, in the early 1880s

The three ships of the Wolf class spent nearly their entire careers in active service on foreign stations, generally returning to Germany only for overhauls and modifications. Wolf's first voyage, from 1878 to 1884, took the ship to East Asia, primarily off the coast of China. On the way home, she was involved in the establishment of the colony of German South West Africa. Immediately after entering service in late 1879, Hyäne began the first of three extended cruises abroad. She sailed first for South America before moving to the South Pacific, where she served as one of the station ships in Samoa until 1879.

She returned to the South Pacific in 1882, and on the way, she stopped in Easter Island to examine the island. While in the South Pacific, Hyäne took part in the establishment of the colony of German New Guinea. She moved to eastern Africa in early 1886 to support attempts to establish a colony there before returning home in late 1887. Iltis was sent on a deployment to East Asia in 1880 that lasted until 1886. The ship spent much of this time patrolling the coast of China, ready to protect German nationals in the country if need be. This included retaliating against pirates in the Pescadores Islands in 1882 and guarding Germans in Guangzhou, China, in 1883. She was sent to the central Pacific in 1885 during an unsuccessful attempt to wrest control of the Caroline Islands from Spain. After returning home in 1886, she was overhauled and modernized.

Wolf's next cruise, which lasted from 1886 to 1895, initially returned to East Asian waters, but she spent most of her time abroad in the South Pacific. In 1889, she carried the exiled King of Samoa, Malietoa Laupepa, back to the islands, where he was reinstated as king. In 1891, she rescued survivors from the wrecked Ottoman frigate Ertuğrul. Hyäne's final deployment overseas began in 1888 and lasted until 1897. During this period, Hyäne operated in Kamerun in Central Africa and routinely supported efforts to suppress rebellions against German rule. Iltis was recommissioned in 1887 for another voyage to East Asian waters that lasted for nine years. She observed naval events during the First Sino-Japanese War, and took part in the rescue of Chinese sailors and soldiers after the Battle of Pungdo, and she was present when the main Japanese and Chinese fleets clashed at the Battle of the Yalu River. Iltis sank in a typhoon while cruising in the Yellow Sea on 23 July 1896. Fatality figures vary; out of a crew of 82, 71 died according to Nottelmann, but Gröner states that 76 men died in the sinking.

After returning to Germany in 1895, Wolf was converted into a survey ship, and in this capacity, she was sent to map Germany's colonies in Africa. Wolf operated off the coast of Kamerun and German South West Africa until 1905. Throughout this period, the ship was also used for other tasks, including assisting the colonial Schutztruppe suppress unrest. Hyäne was also converted into a survey ship in 1897, though she served in home waters, a role she filled from 1899 to 1906 and then from 1911 to 1914. Wolf was struck from the naval register on 3 February 1906 and thereafter converted into a repair ship based at Danzig. She served in this capacity until after World War I, and was sold to ship breakers on 26 April 1919. After the outbreak of World War I in August 1914, Hyäne was stationed as a guard ship on the Eider river. In May 1916, she returned to surveying duties. After the war, she was struck from the register on 7 April 1920, after having already been sold to a merchant shipping company on 15 July 1919. Renamed Seewolf, she served as a commercial vessel until 2 May 1924, when her cargo caught fire in Dieppe, France. She sank in the harbor, but was later raised and scrapped.
