= SMS Cyclop =

Three ships of the Imperial German Navy have been named SMS Cyclop:

- SMS Cyclop (1860): gunboat, launched 1860
- SMS Cyclop (1916): dock ship, launched 1916
