= SMS Iltis (1878) =

German gunboat of the 1870s

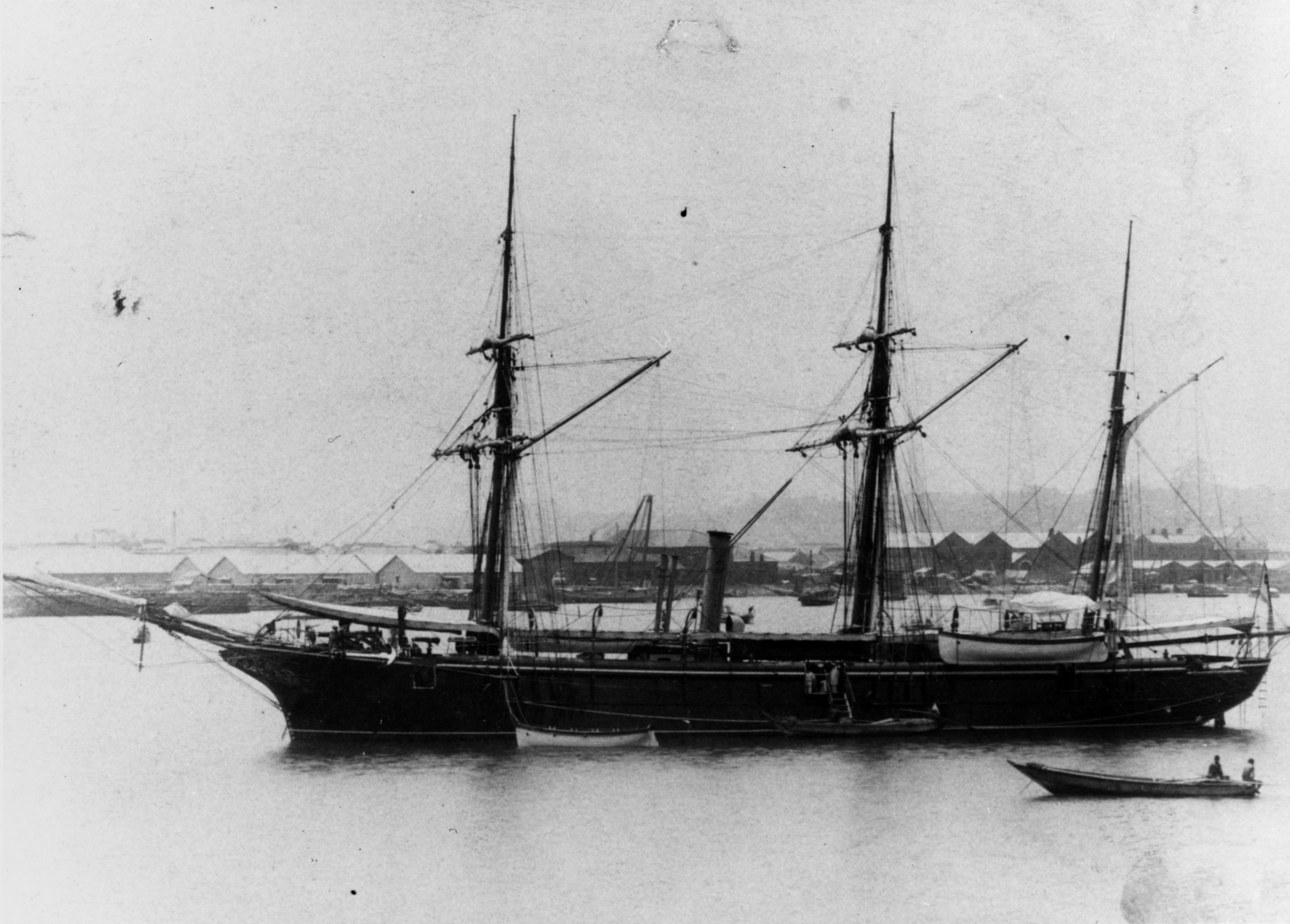
- Iltis in East Asia, probably shortly before her loss in 1896

History
- Name: Iltis
- Namesake: Polecat
- Operator: Imperial German Navy
- Ordered: 26 May 1877
- Builder: Kaiserliche Werft Danzig
- Laid down: June 1877
- Launched: 18 September 1878
- Commissioned: 2 March 1880
- Fate: Wrecked, 1896

General characteristics
- Class & type: Wolf-class gunboat
- Displacement: 570 t (560 long tons)
- Length: 47.2 m (154 ft 10 in)
- Beam: 7.66 m (25 ft 2 in)
- Draft: 3.1 m (10 ft 2 in)
- Installed power: 2 × fire tube boilers; 340 PS (340 ihp)
- Propulsion: 1 × marine steam engine; 1 × screw propeller
- Speed: 8.5 knots (15.7 km/h; 9.8 mph)
- Range: 1,640 nmi (3,040 km; 1,890 mi) at 9 kn (17 km/h; 10 mph)
- Complement: 5 officers; 80 enlisted men
- Armament: 2 × 12.5 cm (4.9 in) gun; 2 × 8.7 cm (3.4 in) guns; 3 × 37 mm (1.5 in) Hotchkiss revolver cannon

SMS Iltis was the third and final member of the Wolf class of steam gunboats built for the German Kaiserliche Marine (Imperial Navy) in the 1870s. The ship was ordered as part of a construction program intended to begin replacing the old Jäger-class gunboats that had been built a decade earlier. Unlike the older ships, Iltis was intended to serve abroad to protect German economic interests overseas. The ship was armed with a battery of two medium-caliber guns and five lighter weapons, and had a top speed of 8.5 knots (15.7 km/h; 9.8 mph).

Iltis was sent on a deployment to East Asia in 1880 that lasted until 1886. The ship spent much of this time patrolling the coast of China, ready to protect German nationals in the country if need be. This included retaliating against pirates in the Pescadores Islands in 1882 and guarding Germans in Guangzhou, China, in 1883. She was sent to the central Pacific in 1885 during an unsuccessful attempt to wrest control of the Caroline Islands from Spain. After returning home in 1886, she was overhauled and modernized.

The ship was recommissioned in 1887 for another voyage to East Asian waters that lasted for nine years. She observed naval events during the First Sino-Japanese War, and took part in the rescue of Chinese sailors and soldiers after the Battle of Pungdo, and she was present when the main Japanese and Chinese fleets clashed at the Battle of the Yalu River. In 1896, a typhoon drove Iltis aground en route to Qingdao, breaking her hull in half. Seventy-one men were killed in the sinking.

== Design ==
German economic activity in Qing China in the 1870s faced significant threats from piracy and resistance from local officials, so the German Kaiserliche Marine (Imperial Navy) stationed warships in East Asia to protect its trade interests. At the same time, the old Jäger-class gunboats that had been ordered in 1859 needed to be replaced. The two Albatross-class gunboats and the rebuilt Cyclop were too few for the task of patrolling the Far East, so another three vessels were ordered according to the fleet plan that had been approved in 1872. The design for the new ships was completed in 1876, and it called for reusing the engines from three of the Camäleon-class gunboats that had also been ordered in the 1859 plan. These three ships became the Wolf-class gunboats. They were to be used extensively abroad to support the fleet's larger cruising screw corvettes and screw frigates.

Iltis was 47.2 meters (154 ft 10 in) long overall, with a beam of 7.66 m (25 ft 2 in) and a draft of 3.1 m (10 ft 2 in). She displaced 490 metric tons (480 long tons) as designed and 570 t (560 long tons) at full load. The ship's crew consisted of 5 officers and 80 enlisted men. She was powered by a marine steam engine that drove a 2-bladed screw propeller, with steam provided by two coal-fired trunk fire-tube boilers. Her propulsion system was rated to produce a top speed of 8.5 knots (15.7 km/h; 9.8 mph) at 340 metric horsepower (340 ihp), but she reached 9.2 knots (17.0 km/h; 10.6 mph) in service. At a cruising speed of 9 knots (17 km/h; 10 mph), she could steam for 1,640 nautical miles (3,040 km; 1,890 mi). To supplement the steam engine on long voyages, the ships were fitted with a barque sailing rig.

The ship was armed with a pair of 12.5 cm (4.9 in) K L/23 built-up guns, which were supplied with a total of 270 rounds of ammunition. She carried an additional pair of 8.7 cm (3.4 in) K L/24 built up guns and three 37 mm (1.5 in) Hotchkiss revolver cannon.

== Service history ==
The contract for Iltis, which was named after the polecat, was awarded to the Kaiserliche Werft Danzig (Imperial Shipyard) in Danzig on 26 May 1877, and she was laid down in June that year under the provisional name "Ersatz Tiger". (Note: German warships were ordered under provisional names. Additions to the fleet were given a single letter; ships intended to replace older or lost vessels were ordered as "Ersatz (name of the ship to be replaced)".) She was launched on 18 September 1878, and Kapitän zur See (Captain at Sea) Otto Livonius, who was the director of the shipyard, gave a speech at the launching ceremony. Work on the ship was delayed to allow the navy to gain experience with the rebuilt gunboat Cyclop. Iltis was commissioned and manned with shipyard personnel on 2 March 1880 to move the ship to Kiel. She was decommissioned on 15 March, and then reactivated on 9 April to transfer the ship to Wilhelmshaven. During that period, the ship was initially commanded by Kapitänleutnant (Captain Lieutenant) Wilhelm Büchsel, but he was replaced by KL Oscar Klausa later in April. The ship was then decommissioned again on 22 May.

=== First overseas deployment, 1880–1886 ===
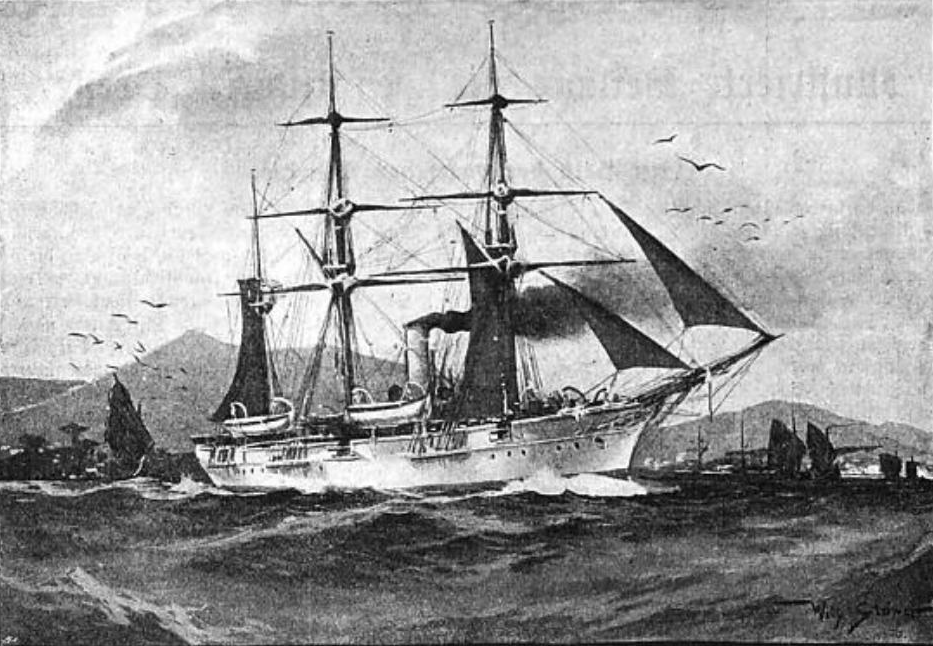
Iltis under way, by Willy Stöwer

Iltis was recommissioned on 1 July, again under Klausa's command, for a deployment to East Asia, where she was to replace Cyclop in the East Asia Cruiser Squadron. She arrived in the region on 19 September, allowing Cyclop to return home. In late January 1881, Iltis, the screw corvette Freya, and several Chinese gunboats unsuccessfully searched Mirs Bay for pirates who had attacked the German barque Occident. Beginning on 20 March, Iltis began a tour of the Philippines, steaming as far south as the Sulu Archipelago. She returned to Chinese waters on 24 April, and visited several southern Chinese ports in June before returning to northern China at the end of the month. On 28 July, she stopped in Yantai. There, she took part in training exercises on 3 September with the screw frigate Hertha and the corvette Stosch. Over the following month and a half, she cruised in northern Chinese waters, at times with the other two vessels and at times alone. She steamed up the Hai River in late October to visit Tianjin.

In early January 1882, Iltis sailed for southern Chinese waters once again. She was sent to relieve her sister ship Wolf in early May, which had been conducting surveys in the Paracel Islands but had been ordered elsewhere. Iltis then took over survey operations in the area, with the probable intention of searching for a suitable location to establish a coaling station. Later that year, Iltis returned north, but on 28 August, she was ordered south again; the Anglo-Egyptian War had broken out in July, and Iltis was to be transferred to the Mediterranean Sea to protect German interests. But the move proved to be unnecessary, and the ship was instead diverted to the Pescadores Islands, where the German brig August had run aground and her crew had been robbed by pirates. A landing party was sent ashore, and with assistance from the Chinese army, they recovered most of the stolen cargo. Civil unrest against foreigners broke out in China later in 1882, and Iltis spent much of the rest of the year patrolling the coast, ready to intervene if necessary. In late November, Iltis was caught in a hurricane and lost her foremast. She proceeded to Shanghai for repairs, which were completed by the end of December.

In early 1883, Iltis returned to the south China coast, and resumed survey work in the Paracel Islands. On 30 April, she departed to sail to Nagasaki, Japan, where she underwent periodic repairs. In June, she resumed cruising in the East China Sea and South China Sea for the next two months. KL Fritz Rötger arrived in August to replace Klausa as the ship's captain. In September, when the squadron commander ordered Iltis to proceed to Guangzhou, China. French colonial activities in Tonkin, which would eventually lead to the Sino-French War, caused riots in China directed against Europeans, who had fled Guangzhou to Shamian island in the Pearl River. Iltis did not need to intervene in the situation, however. In mid-January 1884, she returned to Shanghai for an overhaul that lasted until mid-April. By that time, the cruiser squadron had been strengthened, and now consisted of the frigate Elisabeth, the corvettes Stosch, Stein, and Leipzig, and Iltis and Wolf. After the outbreak of war between France and China later that year, unrest against Europeans spread along the Chinese coast, prompting the ships of the squadron to be deployed to protect Germans throughout the country. Iltis also conducted surveys in the Paracel Islands, and from June to July, was in Nagasaki for maintenance. In mid-December, she sailed to Incheon, Korea, to protect German interests there during a period of domestic unrest.

Sketch of Iltis

In 1885, the cruiser squadron was disbanded, and most of the ships were sent elsewhere, leaving only Iltis, Nautilus, and Elisabeth, though the last vessel was also transferred to eastern African waters in June. The Sino-French War had ended by then, which reduced the need for German vessels in the region. In early August, Iltis was sent to the south Pacific to protect German economic interests in Palau and the Caroline Islands, particularly against Spanish claims to the islands. Germany and Britain disputed Spain's claim to own the islands, arguing that the Spanish had never exercised control. On 25 July, the German government informed its Spanish counterpart that it intended to raise the German flag over the main islands in the chain, and Iltis was dispatched to carry out the operation. In August, KL Paul Hofmeier took command of the ship, and on 25 August, her crew raised the German flag at Yap. The following day, Hofmeier demanded the Spanish flag be lowered at another location on the island, which the local Spanish authority did. The Spanish government nevertheless protested the move, which culminated in an agreement mediated by Pope Leo XIII that saw the islands restored to Spanish control on 17 December.

Iltis had, meanwhile, left Yap on 31 August and stopped in Manila in the Philippines to report on her actions in the south Pacific; there, she received orders to return home. She passed through Singapore on 18 September, where her orders were cancelled owing to an increase in attacks against foreigners in China in response to the Chinese defeat in the Sino-French War. Because Iltis was the only German warship available in the region, she was sent back north to protect German nationals in the country. She spent more than half of a year patrolling the coast, until 17 April 1886, when she was able to depart from Hong Kong, bound for Germany. On the way home, dysentery broke out among the crew, forcing the ship to stop in Malta on 14 July, where twelve sailors were sent ashore to recuperate. Iltis resumed the voyage home on 27 July, eventually arriving back in Wilhelmshaven, where she was decommissioned on 3 September for an extensive overhaul and modernization.

=== Second overseas deployment, 1887–1896 ===
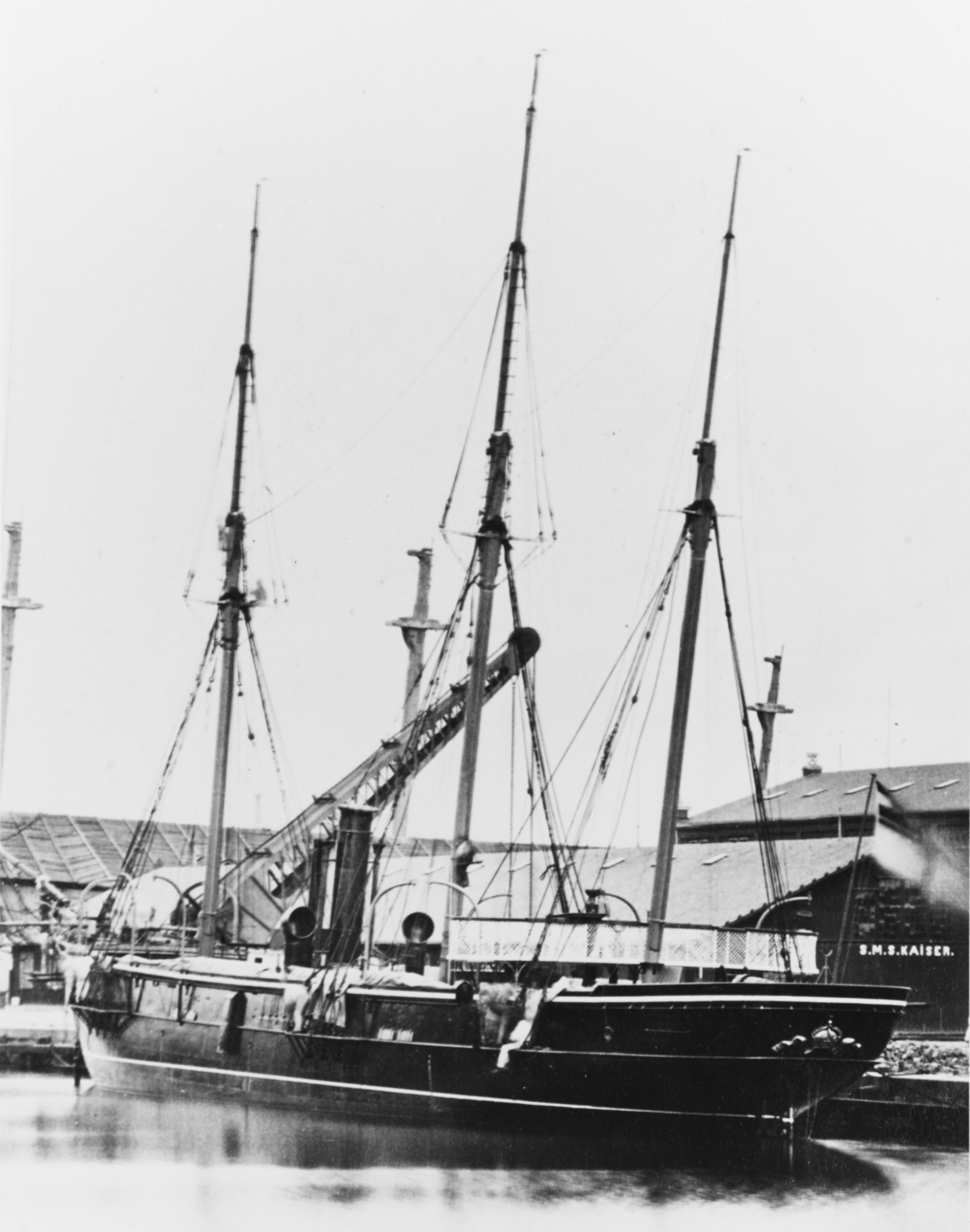
Iltis in Wilhelmshaven in the late 1880s

Work on the ship was completed by April 1887, and Iltis was recommissioned on 13 April, under the command of KL Rudolf von Eickstedt. She got underway for another tour in East Asian waters on 25 April, and she arrived in Hong Kong on 22 July. There, she replaced Nautilus on the station. She sailed to Guangzhou in late October where clashes had broken out between Chinese and European customs officials, and her intervention prevented the conflict from spreading to the settlement on Shamian. In early January 1888, the East Asia Cruiser Squadron was reformed, but already in May, the unit was disbanded and the larger vessels were sent to East Africa. Iltis spent the rest of the year touring Chinese ports, and after stopping in Yantai her crew contracted cholera from an outbreak in the city. For the winter of 1888–1889, she sailed to Tianjin; her rigging was removed over the winter, and a protective upper deck was installed temporarily.

In March 1889, the ship began cruising in northern East Asian waters, sailing as far north as Vladivostok, Russia. These activities were interrupted by a lengthy repair period in Shanghai. In June, KL Karl Ascher arrived to replace Eickstedt as the ship's captain. By early 1890, the East Asia Squadron had been reformed again, and in April, she sailed in company with other vessels of the unit. Cholera proved to be a more significant threat over the summer months that year, as outbreaks ravaged numerous Chinese ports. Iltis returned to Incheon in September, where Ascher conducted commercial negotiations with the Korean government. Captain Constantin von Hanneken, a German artillerist advising the Chinese government, invited Iltis to observe shooting practice in Weihaiwei in October. She then returned to Tianjin for the winter months.

In early 1891, Iltis met with the other ships of the cruiser squadron, before sailing to explore the Yangtze river in April. Chinese opposition to Catholic missionaries led to widespread attacks against foreign holdings in Hankou, which included destruction of consulates and murder of Europeans. Iltis joined a small flotilla that included a vessel each from the French, British, and United States fleets, which suppressed the violence by mid-July. Iltis left the area on 12 July, and thereafter cruised in the Bohai Sea, until a resumption of violence led to her return to the Yangtze. In November, KL Georg Alexander von Müller took command of the ship. This year, she spent the winter months in Shanghai. Further unrest in the Yangtze prompted Iltis to return for the first half of 1892. She returned to Tianjin for the winter of 1892–1893. In early 1893, she began a tour of Korean and Japanese ports before returning to Shanghai.

==== First Sino-Japanese War ====
Iltis got underway again on 6 January 1894; the year would prove to be a difficult one for the crew, since she and Wolf were the only German vessels in the area. Tensions between China and Japan over claims to Korea had become a crisis that would soon spin out of control into the First Sino-Japanese War. Various European countries began to reinforce their embassies in Korea, and in June, Iltis went to Incheon, where on 27 July she sent a contingent of twenty-three men ashore to strengthen the guards at the German embassy. Two days earlier, elements of the Chinese and Japanese fleets fought the Battle of Pungdo, which resulted in the sinking of the transport SS Kowshing, which had been carrying Chinese reinforcements for their army in Korea. Hanneken was aboard the vessel and survived; he made his way to Iltis on 28 July, which then sailed to rescue some 200 men who had also survived the sinking. Iltis and a French gunboat picked up the shipwrecked survivors and took them to Yantai.

Marine biofouling had begun to severely affect the ship's hull by this time, so Iltis proceeded to the Chinese naval base at Port Arthur to be drydocked for cleaning on 7 August. After concluding the work, Iltis sailed back to Yantai on 23 August. She thereafter cruised in the Yellow Sea, and was present to observe the Battle of the Yalu River between the main Japanese and Chinese Beiyang Fleet on 17 September That month, Leutnant zur See (Lieutenant at Sea) Herwarth Schmidt von Schwind temporarily took command of the ship until KL Friedrich von Ingenohl arrived in November. In the meantime, Iltis sailed south to Shanghai on 12 October. Due to the war, the German naval command decided to reestablish the East Asia Cruiser Division, and Iltis and Wolf were assigned to it. Iltis thereafter patrolled the Yangtze until mid-March 1895, when she returned north. By that time, the war was in its final stages, and a peace treaty was signed on 17 April.

The treaty only covered the northern area, and Japan soon invaded Formosa, prompting the European powers to send warships there to protect their nationals. Iltis was among the vessels sent there, along with the protected cruiser SMS Irene. A Chinese coastal fort opened fire on a German steamer, SS Arthur, on 6 June and Iltis intervened, firing three warning shots to stop the fort from further shooting. Over the following days, Iltis and other warships in the area frequently send landing parties ashore to prevent looting. She departed for the mainland on 10 June, and later sailed to Yokohama, Japan, in July.

==== Loss ====
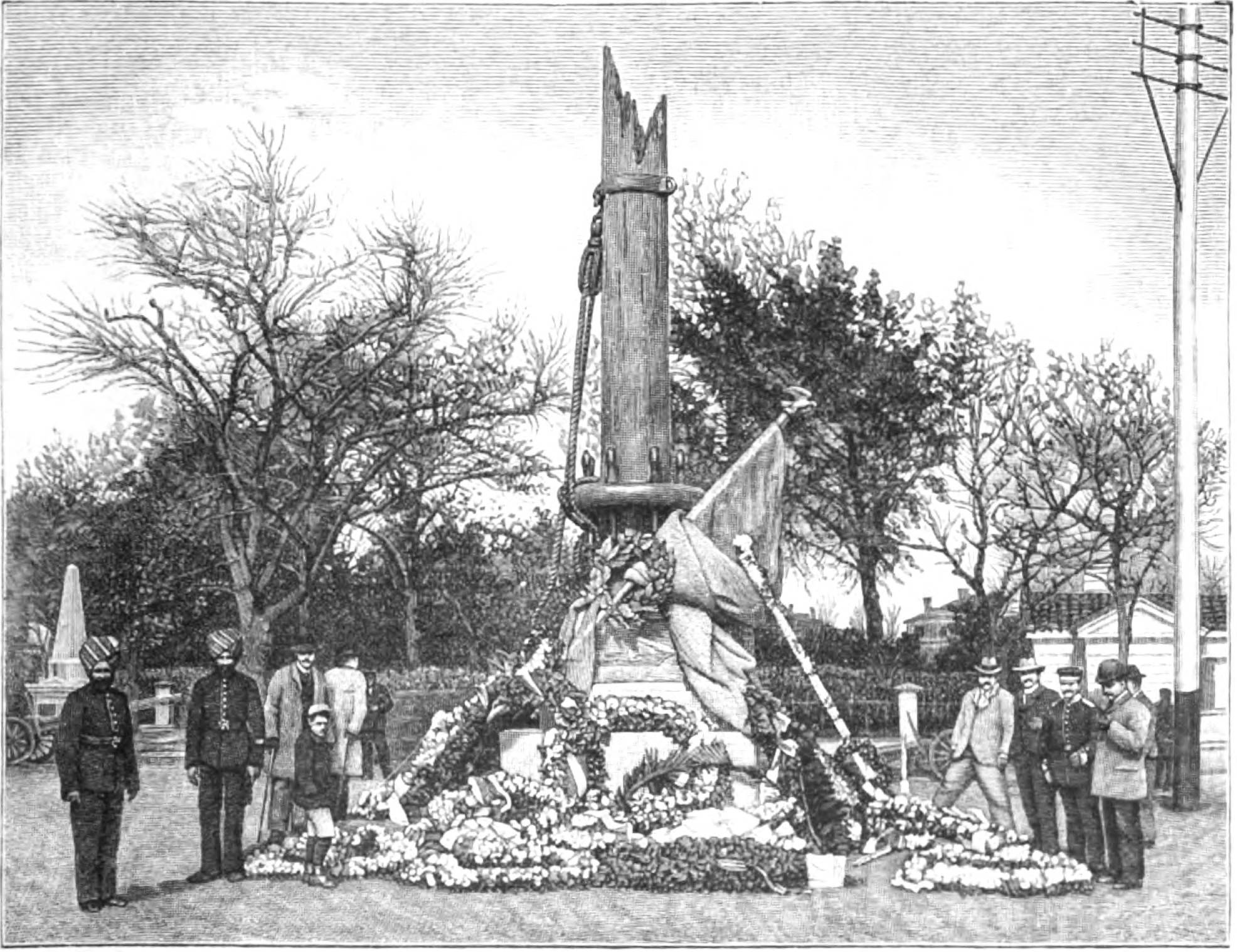
The Iltis Memorial in Qingdao, c. 1901

In early 1896, Iltis cruised throughout the East Asia station, at times with other ships of the division, and at others individually. In April, Iltis docked in Shanghai and Ingenohl left the ship, being replaced by KL Otto Braun. The ship entered the Yangtze in June in company with the protected cruiser SMS Prinzess Wilhelm to sail to Nanjing, where rebels threatened a group of German military advisers. The ships' presence proved to be unnecessary, however, because the provincial governor suppressed the rebellion. On 13 June, Konteradmiral (Rear Admiral) Alfred von Tirpitz became commander of the East Asia Division; his primary objective was to secure a permanent naval base for the division on the Chinese coast. He ordered Iltis to sail to Qingdao on 22 July to survey the port to determine whether it would be suitable.

At around 05:00 on 23 July, Iltis sailed from Yantai, bound for Qingdao; the skies were cloudy, and wind was estimated to be a 2 on the Beaufort scale. By the time she passed Weihaiwei at around 12:00, the wind began picking up, and in the early afternoon, rain and hail began to hamper visibility. At around 16:30, she rounded the Shandong Peninsula near Rongcheng, and turned south; by this time, her crew had reefed the mizzenmast, and she was sailing using only stay and gaff sails. Soon thereafter, the wind increased sharply to 7 or 8 on the Beaufort scale. Iltis pitched and rolled severely in the gale, and at times her screw came out of the water. She was making about 4 knots (7.4 km/h; 4.6 mph) under the conditions.

Unaware that the gale had blown Iltis dangerously close to shore, Braun believed his ship to be clear of the reefs known to be along the Shandong coast, and in the pitch blackness, the crew were unable to determine the ship's position. Half an hour later, a strong gale blew the ship into the reefs, driving her hard aground. The stormy sea enveloped Iltis in spray and quickly broke her hull in two, between the engine room and crew compartment. The bow section capsized and the stern section was knocked onto the reef, upside down and next to the bow section, by a powerful breaker. Out of her crew, seventy-one died in the accident; another eleven survived aboard the wreck for two days, and three men were able to swim to shore. On 25 July, the German and Chinese crew from a nearby lighthouse were able to go pick up the eleven survivors still on the wreck. Tirpitz learned of the accident on 27 July, and he sent the corvette Arcona and the unprotected cruiser Cormoran to the accident site. The ships recovered twenty-seven bodies and buried them in a cemetery near the lighthouse.

The Germans erected a memorial to the crew near the lighthouse after the accident. During World War I, it was destroyed. A second monument, erected in the Shanghai International Settlement on 20 November 1898, survived the war but was knocked down in November 1918. The government returned it to local Germans in 1923, who restored it at the German School in Shanghai on 22 May 1929. It survived World War II, but was dismantled during the Cultural Revolution in the 1960s. Iltis's bell was returned to Germany and initially display at the Museum für Meereskunde in Berlin, but was lost during World War II. It eventually turned up at a scrap dealer in the 1950s, when it was acquired by the local Deutschen Marine-Bund (German Navy Association) and then donated to the Wehrgeschichtliches Museum Rastatt in Rastatt.
