= SMS Otter (1877) =

German gunboat of the 1870s

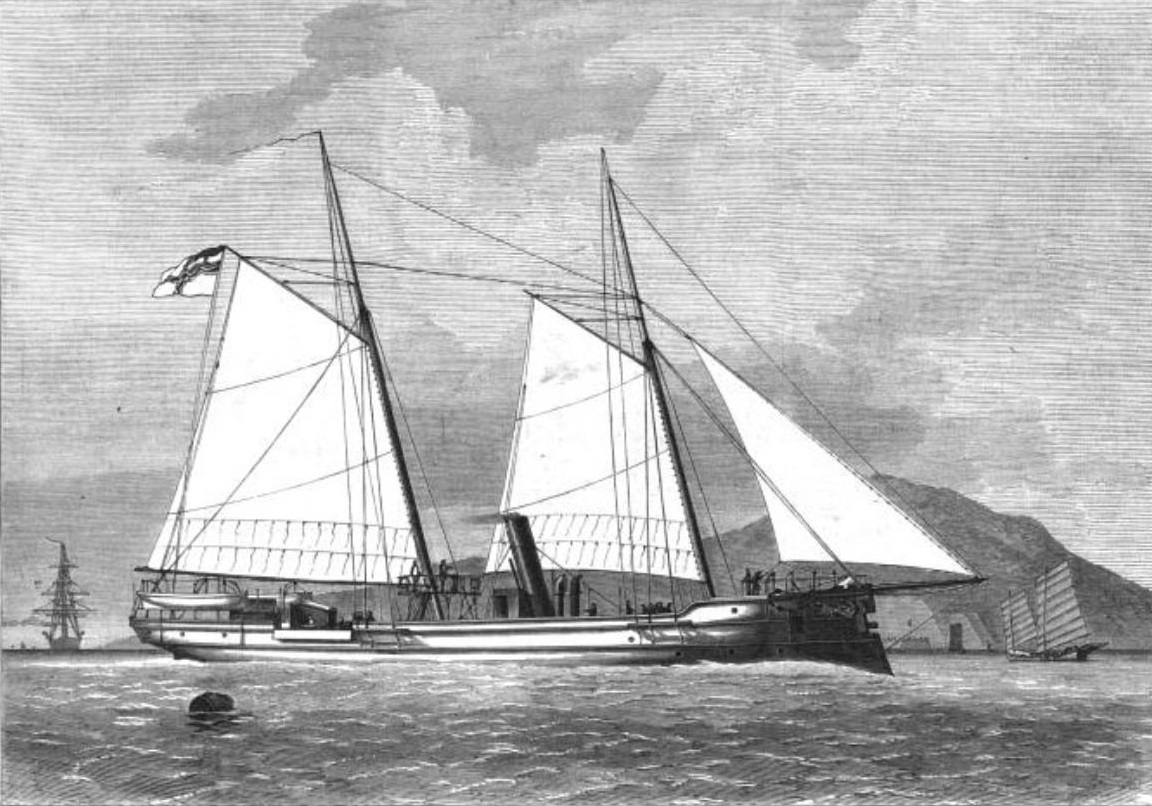
- Otter under sail

Class overview
- Preceded by: Wespe class
- Succeeded by: Wolf class

History
- Name: Otter
- Operator: Imperial German Navy
- Builder: Schichau-Werke, Elbing
- Laid down: 1877
- Launched: 7 June 1877
- Commissioned: 1 April 1878
- Decommissioned: 18 March 1907
- Stricken: 27 May 1907
- Fate: Broken up, 1926

General characteristics
- Type: Steam gunboat
- Displacement: Designed: 130 t (130 long tons); Full load: 164 t (161 long tons)
- Length: 31 m (102 ft)
- Beam: 6.15 m (20 ft 2 in)
- Draft: 1.63 m (5 ft 4 in)
- Installed power: 1 × fire-tube boiler; 140 PS (140 ihp)
- Propulsion: 2 × marine steam engines; 2 × screw propellers
- Speed: 8 knots (15 km/h; 9.2 mph)
- Complement: 1 officer; 42 enlisted
- Armament: 1 × 12 cm (4.7 in) built-up gun; 2 × 8 cm (3.1 in) built-up guns

SMS Otter was a steam gunboat built for the German Kaiserliche Marine (Imperial Navy) in the 1870s. Originally intended for use in Chinese waters against local pirates, she instead remained in Germany through her career as a training ship. This was the result of the ship's very poor seaworthiness, which prevented her from making the long voyage to China. In German waters, she operated as a tender for the artillery school from 1880 to 1886; from 1887 to 1897, she served in the Ship Inspection Commission; and then from 1898 to 1907, Otter was assigned to the Mine Testing Commission. The ship became part of the torpedo school from 1907 to 1912, when she was converted into a coal storage barge. She was then sold into private service in 1914, ultimately to Anschütz & Co., which used Otter for compass testing. She was eventually broken up in 1926.

== Design ==
By the mid-1870s, German economic interests in China had significantly increased, and German businesses had begun to come under attack by local pirates. Because the pirates operated out of rivers and shallow bays, larger cruising warships could not be used to attack them, necessitating a small, purpose-built warship. In the mid-1870s, Germany stationed four to ten warships in the Pacific, in part to combat piracy in Chinese waters, but all were larger corvettes or ocean-going gunboats. Other naval powers, such as the British Royal Navy, stationed more than a hundred small gunboats for use in shallow coastal and riverine waters, and by 1876, the Kaiserliche Marine (Imperial Navy) had decided that Germany should station at least one such vessel in Chinese waters. The contract for the ship was awarded to Schichau-Werke, the first time a German shipbuilding was contracted to build a warship for the fleet. Schichau had done the design work on a speculative basis, before the contract had been awarded, and the ship was acquired outside the normal process that required the navy to adhere to the fleet plan that Albrecht von Stosch had laid out in 1872.

=== Characteristics ===
Otter was 29.1 meters (95 ft 6 in) long at the waterline and 31 m (101 ft 8 in) long overall. She had a beam of 6.15 m (20 ft 2 in) and a draft of 1.13 to 1.63 m (3 ft 8 in to 5 ft 4 in). Her hull was constructed with transverse iron frames, and was divided into four watertight compartments. Her hull had a flat bottom, which made it suitable for inshore work. She displaced 130 metric tons (130 long tons) as designed and 164 t (161 long tons) at full load.

The ship's crew consisted of 1 officer and 42 enlisted men. She carried a yawl and a dinghy. Steering was controlled by a single rudder. The ship handled poorly in heavy seas and made severe leeway. She was nevertheless very maneuverable and answered commands from the helm well.

She was powered by a pair of 2-cylinder marine steam engines that drove a pair of 4-bladed screw propellers that were 1 m (3 ft 3 in) in diameter. Steam was provided by a single coal-fired, cylindrical fire-tube boiler. Her propulsion system was rated to provide a top speed of 8 knots (15 km/h; 9.2 mph) at 140 metric horsepower (140 ihp). She carried 15 t (15 long tons; 17 short tons) of coal for the boiler. At a cruising speed of 7 knots (13 km/h; 8.1 mph), she could steam for 1,181 nautical miles (2,187 km; 1,359 mi). To supplement the steam engines on longer voyages, she was fitted with a two-masted schooner rig with a total sail area of 325 m^{2} (3,500 sq ft).

Otter carried a single 12 cm (4.7 in) K L/23 built-up gun mounted in her bow. She also carried a pair of 8 cm (3.1 in) built-up guns. All of these guns were removed in 1880 after an accident during shooting practice.

== Service history ==
The keel for Otter was laid down in 1877 at the Schichau-Werke shipyard in Elbing, under construction number 110. She was launched on 7 June 1877, and was named for the eponymous mammal. After fitting out, she was commissioned on 11 March 1878 to begin sea trials. The ship's first commander was Leutnant zur See (Lieutenant at Sea) Max Piraly. Otter's poor seaworthiness was quickly realized, and a planned transfer from Elbing to Wilhelmshaven on Germany's North Sea coast, which was to have taken the ship around Denmark, had to be cancelled. Instead, she was sent through the Eider Canal, and after arriving in Wilhelmshaven, she was decommissioned on 19 June. Otter was drawn into the controversy between the Chief of the Admiralty, General Albrecht von Stosch, and the Reichstag (Imperial Diet), which had begun with the sinking of the ironclad Grosser Kurfürst in 1878. The original plan, to dismantle Otter, ship the components to China, and then reassemble her there, proved to be impossible, and the ship was unable to make the long voyage herself, given her very poor seaworthiness.

Instead of her planned deployment abroad, Otter would remain in home waters. As a result, her sailing rig was removed. From 1880 to 1886, Otter served as a tender for the artillery training school. During this period, she was not actively commissioned. On 16 July 1880, several deck planks were damaged during shooting practice, which led to the ship being disarmed. This made Otter not only the smallest warship ever to sail under the Reichskriegsflagge (Imperial War Flag), but the only one capable of firing just salutes. On 25 November 1884, Otter was reclassified from a 2nd class gunboat to an artillery school ship tender.

Otter was recommissioned on 11 July 1887 to be transferred from Wilhelmshaven to Kiel in the Baltic Sea to join the Ship Inspection Commission. Unlike her initial period in service, this time, Otter's crew made the voyage through the North Sea and around Denmark. She was decommissioned there on 22 July. The ship returned to active service on 1 September, under the command of LzS Carl Friedrich. Over the next decade, a number of future admirals commanded the ship, including Johannes Stein from April 1890 to March 1891; Fritz Sommerwerck from August to September 1891; Johannes Schröder from September 1895 to August 1897; and Walter Engelhardt from November to December 1897. In May 1897, Otter passed through the Kaiser Wilhelm Canal before the passageway formally opened.

In 1898, Otter was transferred to the Mine Testing Commission, which was created on 3 January. She served in this unit for the rest of her active career, which ended on 18 March 1907. Another series of future admirals commanded Otter during this period, including: Engelhardt returned to the ship from January 1898 to October 1900; Albertus Petruschky from March to October 1901; Theodor Eschenburg from March to October 1901; and Paul Wolfram from March 1906 to March 1907. On 27 May 1907, Otter was struck from the naval register. She was thereafter used as a stationary training hulk in company with the torpedo training ship Württemberg, and from 1912, was converted into a coal storage barge for use at the Kaiserliche Werft (Imperial Shipyard) in Wilhelmshaven. She was sold to a company in Brake, Lower Saxony on 11 February 1914, and which resold Otter to Anschütz & Co. in Kiel later that year. Anschütz used the ship for compass testing for the next decade. She was eventually broken up in 1926.
