= SMS Hyäne (1878) =

German gunboat of the 1870s

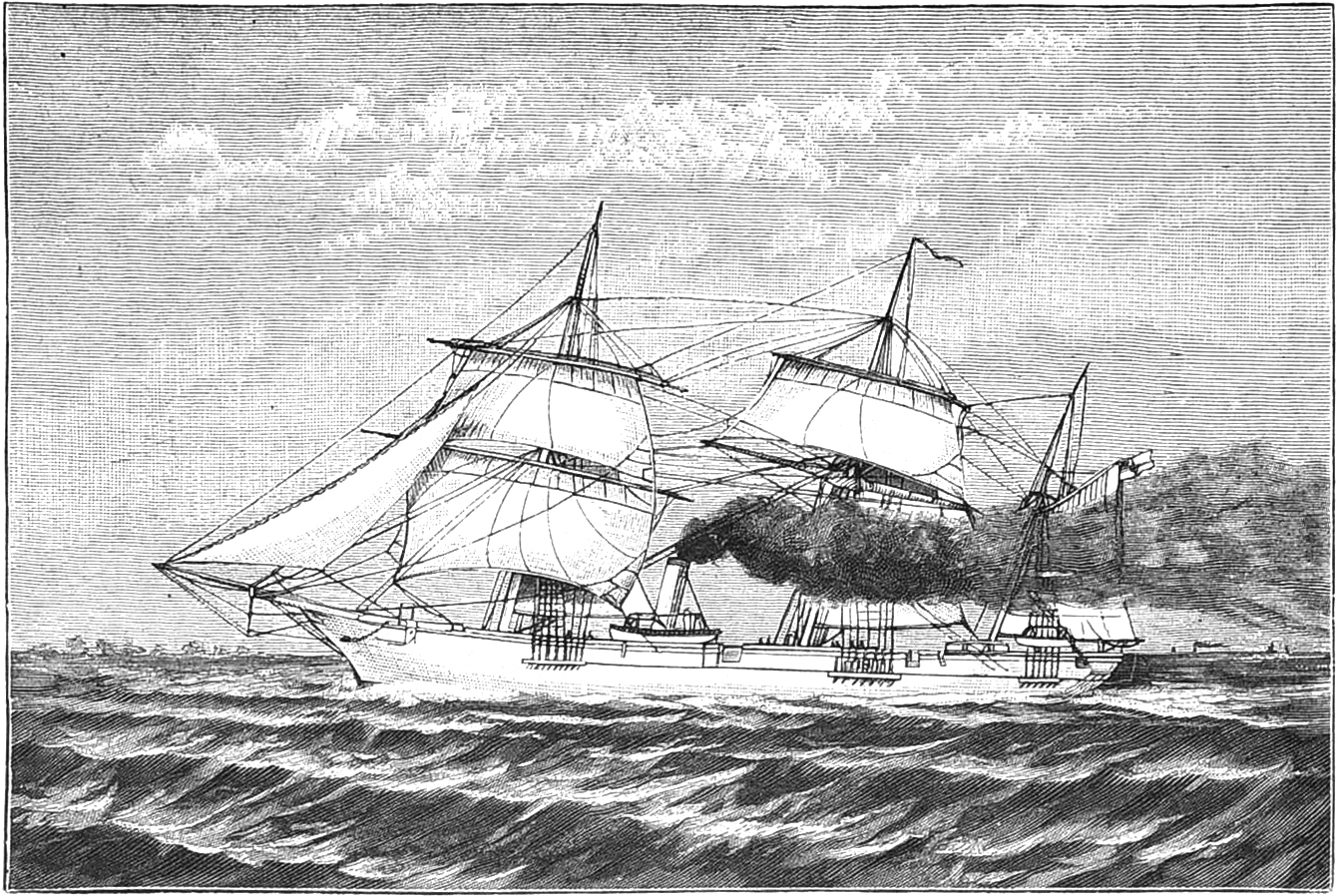
- Hyäne under way

History
- Name: Hyäne
- Operator: Imperial German Navy
- Builder: Kaiserliche Werft, Wilhelmshaven
- Laid down: November 1876
- Launched: 27 June 1878
- Commissioned: 7 September 1879
- Decommissioned: 13 October 1919
- Stricken: 7 April 1920
- Fate: Sold, 15 July 1919

History
- Name: Seewolf
- Owner: Cuxhaven–Brunsbütteler Dampfer A.G.
- Acquired: 1920
- Fate: Burned and sank, 2 May 1924

General characteristics
- Class & type: Wolf-class gunboat
- Displacement: 570 t (560 long tons)
- Length: 47.2 m (154 ft 10 in)
- Beam: 7.66 m (25 ft 2 in)
- Draft: 3.1 m (10 ft 2 in)
- Installed power: 2 × fire tube boilers; 340 PS (340 ihp)
- Propulsion: 1 × marine steam engine; 1 × screw propeller
- Speed: 8.5 knots (15.7 km/h; 9.8 mph)
- Range: 1,640 nmi (3,040 km; 1,890 mi) at 9 kn (17 km/h; 10 mph)
- Complement: 5 officers; 101 enlisted men
- Armament: 2 × 12.5 cm (4.9 in) gun; 2 × 8.7 cm (3.4 in) guns; 3 × 37 mm (1.5 in) Hotchkiss revolver cannon

SMS Hyäne was the second member of the Wolf class of steam gunboats built for the German Kaiserliche Marine (Imperial Navy) in the 1870s. The ship was ordered as part of a construction program intended to begin replacing the old Jäger-class gunboats that had been built a decade earlier. Unlike the older ships, Hyäne was intended to serve abroad to protect German economic interests overseas. The ship was armed with a battery of two medium-caliber guns and five lighter weapons, and had a top speed of 8.5 knots (15.7 km/h; 9.8 mph).

Immediately after entering service in late 1879, Hyäne began the first of three extended cruises abroad. She sailed first for South America before moving to the South Pacific, where she served as one of the station ships in Samoa until 1879. Her next overseas voyage began in 1882, which also took the ship to the Pacific. On the way, she stopped in Easter Island to examine the island. While in the South Pacific, Hyäne took part in the establishment of the colony of German New Guinea. She moved to eastern Africa in early 1886 to support attempts to establish a colony there before returning home in late 1887.

The ship's final deployment overseas began in 1888 and lasted until 1897. During this period, Hyäne operated in Kamerun in Central Africa and routinely supported efforts to suppress rebellions against German rule. After returning to Germany, Hyäne was converted into a survey ship for use in home waters, a role she filled from 1899 to 1906 and then from 1911 to 1914. She served briefly as a guard ship early in World War I, but by 1916, she had returned to survey duties. After the war, she was sold into commercial service in 1919 and converted into a cargo ship, but was accidentally destroyed by fire in 1924 in Dieppe, France.

== Design ==
German economic activity in Qing China in the 1870s faced significant threats from piracy and resistance from local officials, so the German Kaiserliche Marine (Imperial Navy) stationed warships in East Asia to protect its trade interests. At the same time, the old Jäger-class gunboats that had been ordered in 1859 needed to be replaced. The two Albatross-class gunboats and the rebuilt Cyclop were too few for the task of patrolling the Far East, so another three vessels were ordered according to the fleet plan that had been approved in 1872. The design for the new ships was completed in 1876, and it called for reusing the engines from three of the Camäleon-class gunboats that had also been ordered in the 1859 plan. These three ships became the Wolf-class gunboats. They were to be used extensively abroad to support the fleet's larger cruising screw corvettes and screw frigates.

Hyäne was 47.2 meters (154 ft 10 in) long overall, with a beam of 7.66 m (25 ft 2 in) and a draft of 3.1 m (10 ft 2 in). She displaced 490 metric tons (480 long tons) as designed and 570 t (560 long tons) at full load. The ship's crew consisted of 5 officers and 101 enlisted men. She was powered by a marine steam engine that drove a 2-bladed screw propeller, with steam provided by two coal-fired trunk fire-tube boilers. Her propulsion system was rated to produce a top speed of 8.5 knots (15.7 km/h; 9.8 mph) at 340 metric horsepower (340 ihp), but she reached 9.9 knots (18.3 km/h; 11.4 mph) in service. At a cruising speed of 9 knots (17 km/h; 10 mph), she could steam for 1,640 nautical miles (3,040 km; 1,890 mi). To supplement the steam engine on long voyages, the ships were fitted with a barque sailing rig.

The ship was armed with a pair of 12.5 cm (4.9 in) K L/23 built-up guns, which were supplied with a total of 270 rounds of ammunition. She carried an additional pair of 8.7 cm (3.4 in) K L/24 built-up guns and three 37 mm (1.5 in) Hotchkiss revolver cannon.

== Service history ==
=== Construction and first overseas deployment, 1879–1881 ===
Hyäne was laid down at the Kaiserliche Werft (Imperial Shipyard) in Wilhelmshaven in November 1876, under the contract name Ersatz (Replacement) Scorpion. (Note: German warships were ordered under provisional names. Additions to the fleet were given a single letter; ships intended to replace older or lost vessels were ordered as "Ersatz (name of the ship to be replaced)".) She was launched on 27 June 1878 without ceremony, owing to the accidental sinking of the ironclad Grosser Kurfürst. Hyäne was commissioned 7 September 1879 to begin sea trials. These initial tests revealed problems with her sailing rig that required correction before the ship could be sent abroad. The alterations were completed by 1 October, when Hyäne was pronounced ready for active service. Her crew immediately began making preparations for an extended voyage overseas.

On 8 October, Hyäne sailed to join the ironclad corvette Hansa in South America, which was stationed on the continent's west coast to protect German interests during the War of the Pacific between Chile and an alliance between Peru and Bolivia. Hyäne passed through numerous ports along the way, before arriving in Callao, Peru, on 15 February 1880. There, she met Hansa, which was commanded by Kommodore Karl Eduard Heusner. By that time, the situation had calmed sufficiently that Hyäne was no longer needed in the area, and Heusner detached the ship to cross the Pacific to Samoa. She stopped in Papeete, French Polynesia, on the way, before anchoring in Apia, Samoa, on 30 May. She joined the gunboat Nautilus as the station ships in the area. The German consul to the islands, Kapitän zur See (Captain at Sea) Otto Zembsch, embarked aboard Hyäne for a tour of the Samoan island chain that began on 4 June; she anchored back in Apia on 4 August.

Hyäne next departed on 1 October, bound for Auckland, New Zealand, as that was the closest point that was in telegraph contact with Germany. By 5 December, she had returned to Apia. The two gunboats cruised off Upolu through the end of March 1881. At that time, Nautilus was recalled to Germany. Not long thereafter, the screw frigate Hertha and the gunboats Habicht and Möwe had arrived in Samoa, allowing Hyäne to return home as well. She arrived in Wilhelmshaven on 22 September, where she was decommissioned for the winter months on 7 October.

=== Second overseas deployment, 1882–1887 ===
Already on 1 April 1882, Hyäne was recommissioned for another tour abroad, again to the south Pacific. After her crew finished readying the ship for the deployment, she sailed from Wilhelmshaven on 16 April. She sailed around South America, stopping in Montevideo, Uruguay, and Valparaíso, Chile, on the way. From there, she sailed to Easter Island, which was not well known in Europe at the time; this was at the suggestion of Dr. Adolf Bastian, and ethnographer and head of the Altes Museum in Berlin. She anchored off the southern tip of the island on 19 September, and the next day, a landing party went ashore. On 21 September, Hyäne moved to Hanga Roa on the west coast of the island. Over the course of their stay on the island, the crew studied the island and collected artifacts for study in Germany. The gunboat also conducted a survey of the island's coastline and charted the local currents. On 23 September, she departed for Samoa.

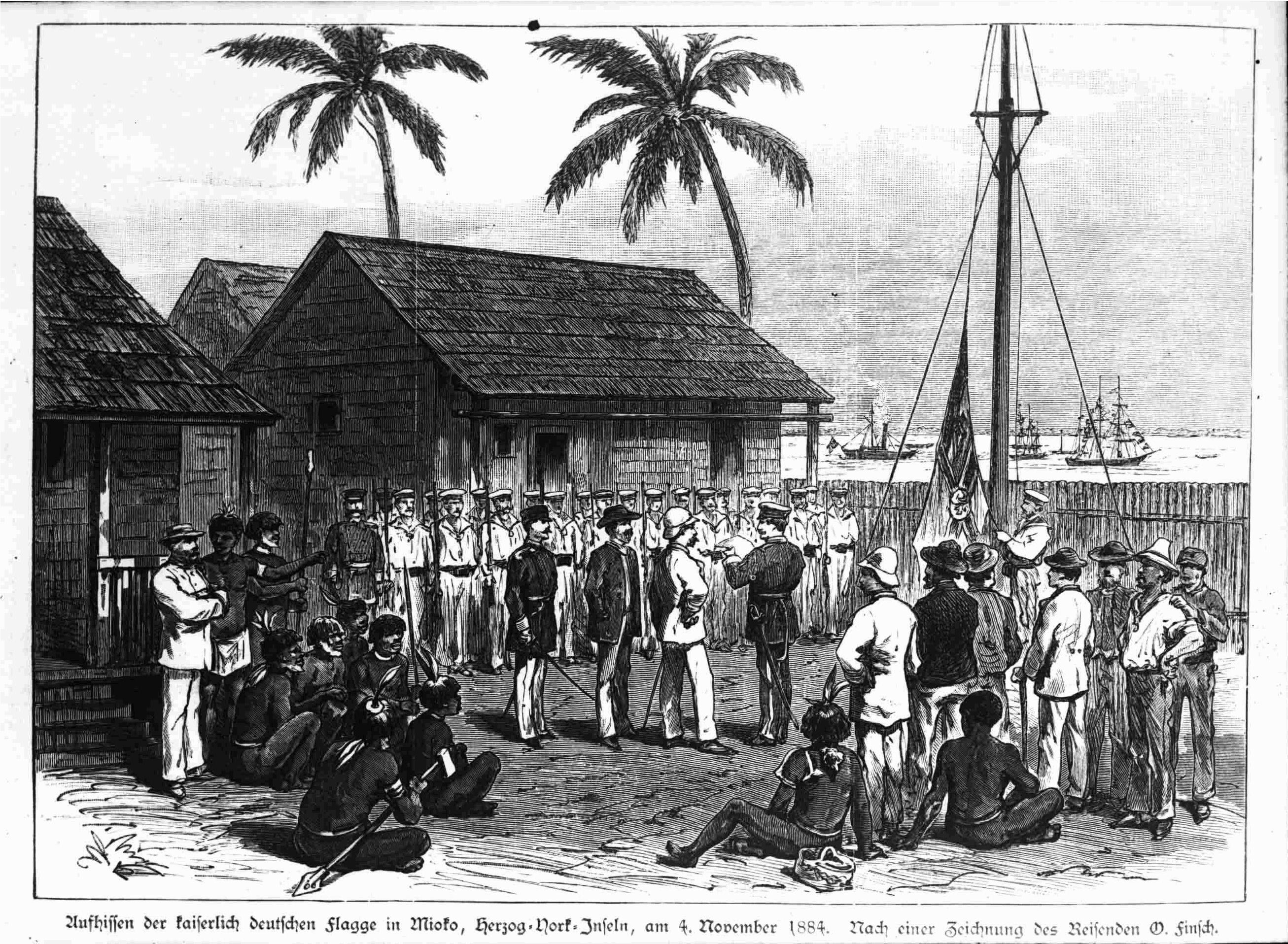
Hoisting of the German flag at Mioko in 1884

Hyäne arrived in Apia on 2 November, where she joined the screw corvette Carola. The two ships sailed together on 22 January 1883, bound for what would be later known as the Bismarck Archipelago. They stopped in Matupi on the main island in the archipelago to visit the small German settlement there, before continuing on to the Hermit Islands in the western end of the island chain. The local residents had committed murders and other crimes against Germans in the area, and Hyäne and Carola were to punish the perpetrators. In addition, Hyäne conducted survey work in the region. The following month, she departed south for another period in Auckland, which lasted from 22 March to 29 April, after which she relieved Carola as the station ship in Apia. Hyäne visited the Tonga islands in July, and from 2 August to 26 October, she underwent an overhaul in Sydney, Australia.

In early 1884, the German government decided to embark on establishing its colonial empire in the Pacific, rather than simply allowing commercial interests to act independently. In August, Germany proclaimed the establishment of the protectorate of German New Guinea. In late October, Hyäne and the screw frigate Elisabeth were ordered to tour the region, raise German flags at key points, and conduct geographic surveys. They were assisted in these endeavors by the scientist and explorer Otto Finsch, who sailed aboard the steamer Samoa. In early 1885, the screw corvette Marie ran aground off the island of Neu-Mecklenburg and Hyäne was sent to assist the grounded vessel. After Marie was refloated, Hyäne towed her to Keppel Bay in Australia, where the corvette Stosch took over towing duties. The three ships then sailed on to Sydney, where Hyäne underwent an overhaul. She visited a number of other Australian ports. The ship's crew was due to be replaced that year, but the replacements died in the accidental sinking of the corvette Augusta, which sank in a storm in the Indian Ocean.

In September, Hyäne was detached from the south Pacific to join the East Africa Cruiser Squadron, then led by the corvette Bismarck. Hyäne arrived off Zanzibar on 8 October and formally joined her new unit. On 18 January 1886, she sailed to Port Louis on the island of Mauritius to rest her crew, but a fever epidemic broke out, which prevented the ship from leaving until 3 May. Hyäne sailed to Aden to take aboard Karl Ludwig Jühlke, the general representative of the German East Africa Company, and bring him to Africa to sign protection treaty with the rulers of Alula, a step in the German colonization of Africa. Hyäne patrolled off the coast with Möwe during the negotiations. From 12 September to 10 November, Hyäne patrolled off the coast of east Africa, and in November, Kapitänleutnant (KL—Captain Lieutenant) Max Galster arrived to take command of the ship. She then anchored in Zanzibar until January 1887. On 9 January, she departed in company with the corvettes Olga and Carola to Manda Bay (in what is now Kenya) to enforce a German protectorate over the area. Hyäne thereafter sailed to Kismayo in an unsuccessful attempt to capture those responsible for the murder of Jühlke. While in Zanzibar on 1 June, the ship received orders to return home. She sailed south, around the Cape of Good Hope and eventually arrived in Kiel on 28 September. She then moved on to Danzig, where she was decommissioned on 11 October.

=== Third overseas deployment, 1888–1897 ===
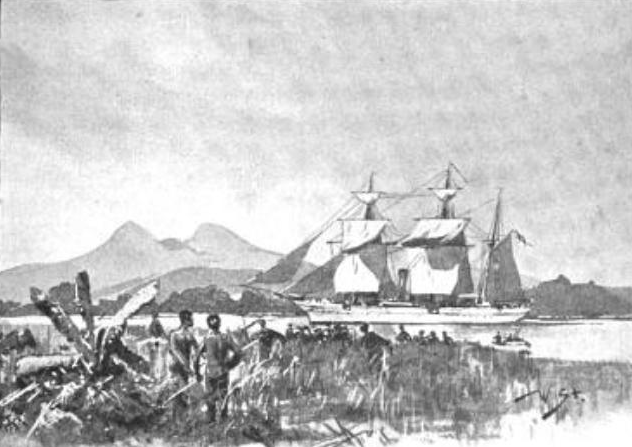
Illustration of Hyäne navigating a river in Kamerun

While out of service, Hyäne underwent an overhaul and modernization at the Kaiserliche Werft in Danzig, which included replacing the worn-out boilers and reducing the railing rig to a schooner rig. She was recommissioned on 2 October 1888 to replace the gunboat Cyclop in western Africa; at that time, her commander was KL Hugo Zeye. Hyäne carried a surveying detachment to explore the recently acquired colony of Kamerun, particularly in the estuary of the Wouri River. This work was interrupted after locals attacked Germans in the town of Bibundi, which prompted Hyäne to sail there and send a landing party ashore. Tropical diseases endemic in the region proved to be a significant challenge for the ship's crew; in late March 1889, all but seventeen men of the crew were sick, prompting Hyäne to sail south to Cape Town to give the men time to recuperate. She was finally able to sail back north on 29 August.

The ship thereafter alternating between survey work in Kamerun and cruising in the Gulf of Guinea. Another period of sickness, which affected 70% of the crew, forced another stay in Cape Town from May to the end of July 1890. Hyäne spent the rest of the year back in Kamerun, patrolling the coast and conducting surveys. In October, KL Hugo Plachte took command of the ship. In early April 1891, Hyäne was sent to Bissau in Portuguese Guinea to protect Germans in the city during heavy fighting between the colonial government and local residents attempting to throw off the Portuguese rulers. By 27 May, she had returned to the coast of Kamerun. The ship later sailed to Cape Town for an overhaul, and she was back off Kamerun by mid-October, when she sent a landing party ashore to support the Schutztruppe (Protection Force) that was battling rebels in the colony.

The years 1892 and 1893 followed a similar pattern as before, with the ship primarily occupied with survey work and coastal patrols. In January 1893, she sent her landing party ashore in Buea for the inauguration of a memorial to the explorer Karl von Gravenreuth, who had died during an expedition in Kamerun. Later that year, a police unit that had been recruited from Dahomey mutinied, prompting Hyäne to send her landing party to suppress it. The unprotected cruiser Sperber was sent to Kamerun with a company of marines to reinforce German forces in the area. On their arrival, Hyäne departed for another overhaul in Cape Town. The next two years passed uneventfully for the ship. During this period, the ship was commanded by KL Max Bachem from October 1894 to October 1895. In May 1896, she received orders to sail south to Swakopmund in German South West Africa to join the unprotected cruiser Seeadler in a campaign to suppress the Khaua-Mbandjeru rebellion. During this period, Hyäne also conducted survey work in the area around Swakopmund. In mid-June, she departed for another overhaul in Cape Town, any by 14 September, she had arrived back off the coast of Kamerun. In October, KL Wilhelm Becker arrived to take command of the ship. On 24 July 1897, the ship left Kamerun for Germany, carrying three local chiefs who had been sentenced to five years' deportation. She arrived in Wilhelmshaven on 11 October, where she was decommissioned twelve days later.

=== Later career ===
The ship was inspected after her lengthy period abroad, and was found to be in suitable condition to be converted into a dedicated survey ship. Her guns were removed and her sailing rig was cut down to auxiliary sails only. The work was completed by early 1899, and she was recommissioned on 1 April under the command of Korvettenkapitän (Corvette Captain) Carl Schönfelder, who also captained the ship in 1900. Based in Wilhelmshaven, she thereafter conducted surveys of the German North Sea coast. The ship served in this role from 1899 to 1906, and then after a period in reserve, from 1911 to 1914. She was typically commissioned in March or April and then laid up in September or October during the first period of service, but from 1911, she remained in commission continuously. KL Karl Seiferling took command of the ship. In April that year, the ship was sent to survey the Adlergrund, where the pre-dreadnought battleship Kaiser Friedrich III had been badly damaged after striking an uncharted rock. KL Max Lans commanded the ship during the 1904 period of service. In 1911, she was commanded by KL Otto Groos briefly, before being replaced by KL Alexander Werth. Beginning in 1912, she was also used to train officers and crews for survey vessels. In September 1913, KL Fritz Conrad became the ship's captain.

After the outbreak of World War I in July 1914, Hyäne ceased survey work and became a guard ship in the mouth of the Eider river. She filled this role for two years, before returning to survey work in June 1916, briefly in the North Sea but soon moving to the Baltic. As German forces made advances against the Russians in the Eastern Front, the ship's activities shifted east, including the areas around Libau, Windau, and then Arensburg. Shortly after the German defeat in the war, Hyäne was decommissioned on 3 December 1918, seemingly bringing an end to a career that had spanned nearly forty years. But on 5 May 1919, the ship was recommissioned to conduct surveys in the Kieler Förde, again under the command of Conrad. On 15 July, she was sold to the firm Cuxhaven–Brunsbütteler Dampfer A.G. (Cuxhaven–Brunsbüttel Steamer Company) for civilian use, but she was not immediately transferred. Instead, she remained in the Kiel area until late September, when she sailed for Wilhelmshaven. There, she was decommissioned for the last time on 13 October. She was eventually struck from the naval register on 7 April 1920.

The ship's civilian owners rebuilt her into a three-masted schooner-rigged sailing vessel, and renamed her Seewolf. She served as a cargo ship until 1924. While moored off Dieppe, France, on 2 May, a fire broke out in the ship's cargo hold, which caused her to sink in shallow water. The wreck was raised, but was found to be damaged so badly that it was not economical to repair her. Instead, Seewolf was broken up.
