= Paul Jaeschke =

German naval officer (1851–1901)

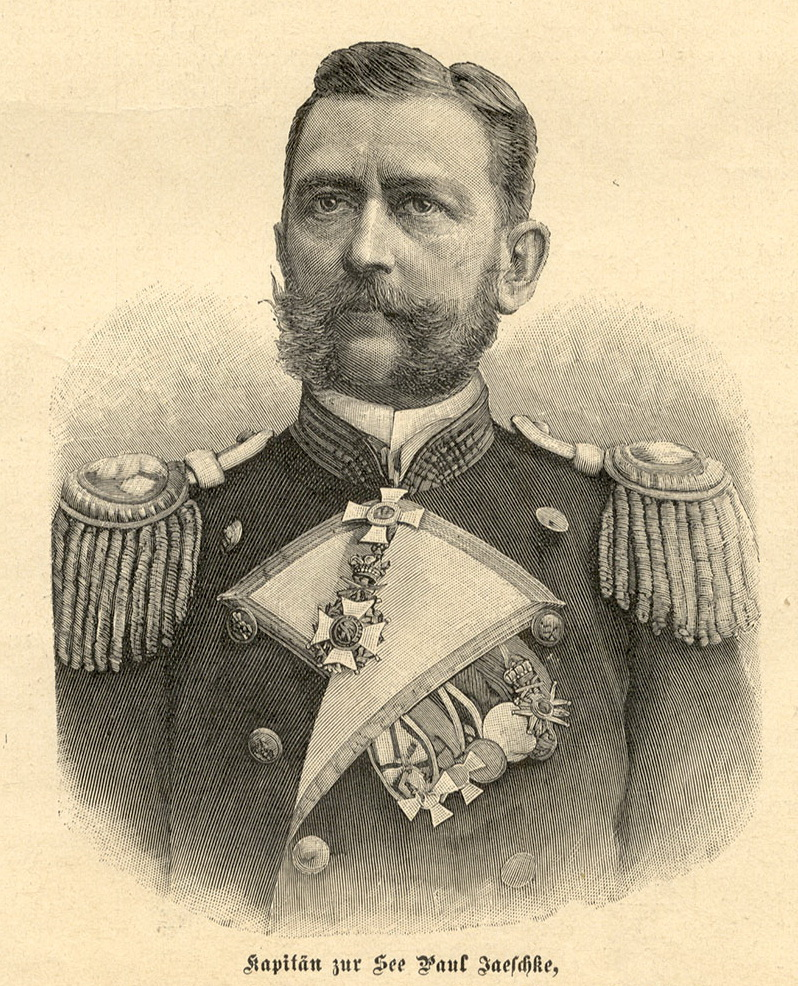
Jaeschke, 1899

Carl Otto Ferdinand Paul Jaeschke (4 August 1851 – 27 January 1901) was a German naval officer and governor of the German-leased Kiautschou Bay concession from 19 February 1899 to 27 January 1901.

== Biography ==
Jaeschke was born the son of a banker in Breslau. When he passed a one-year exam, he entered on 26 April 1868, as a midshipman in the North German Federal Navy. On 18 November 1875, Jaeschke was promoted to lieutenant and subsequently he went through various land and sea uses, which also included foreign uses e.g. in 1875 with the Augusta on the foreign station for the east coast of North America and the West Indies area.

On 16 April 1881, Jaeschke was promoted to Kapitänleutnant and speaker in the inspection of the torpedo. From 1886 to 1888, he was commander of the gunboat SMS Wolf on the East Asian foreign station. On 15 November 1888, he was promoted to corvette captain and in the same year commander of the torpedo department in Kiel. In 1895, he became captain at sea and assigned to command SMS Kaiser.

In May 1896, Jaeschke was ordered back to Berlin to take over the Foreign Department in the German Imperial Naval High Command. On 10 October 1898, Jaeschke was appointed by Alfred von Tirpitz as governor of the German-leased Kiautschou Bay concession, but only arrived at Tsingtau on 18 February 1899.

Jaeschke died on 27 January 1901, of typhoid fever.
