= SMS Cyclop (1860) =

Gunboat of the Prussian and German Imperial Navy

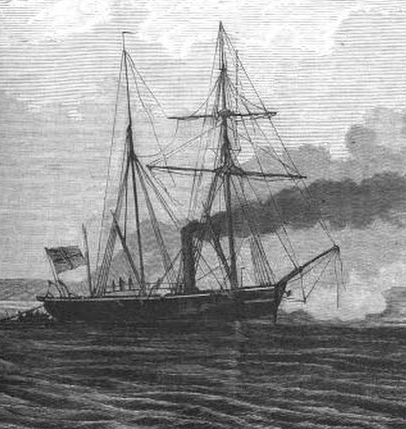
- Illustration of Cyclop's sister ship Meteor

History
- Name: Cyclop
- Operator: Prussian Navy; Imperial German Navy
- Builder: Königliche Werft, Danzig
- Laid down: 1859
- Launched: 8 September 1860
- Commissioned: January 1864
- Stricken: 19 March 1872
- Fate: Reconstructed

History
- Builder: Kaiserliche Werft, Danzig
- Launched: 5 August 1874
- Commissioned: 27 March 1875
- Decommissioned: 1 November 1888
- Fate: Broken up after 1914

General characteristics
- Class & type: Camäleon-class gunboat
- Displacement: 422 t (415 long tons)
- Length: 43.28 m (142 ft)
- Beam: 6.96 m (22 ft 10 in)
- Draft: 2.67 m (8 ft 9 in)
- Installed power: 250 to 320 PS (250 to 320 ihp)
- Propulsion: 1 × marine steam engine
- Speed: 9.1 to 9.3 kn (16.9 to 17.2 km/h; 10.5 to 10.7 mph)
- Complement: 71
- Armament: 1 × 15 cm (5.9 in) gun; 2 × 12 cm (4.7 in) guns

SMS Cyclop was a Camäleon-class steam gunboat of the Prussian Navy (later the Imperial German Navy) that was launched in 1860. The ship was ordered as part of a program to strengthen Prussia's coastal defense forces, then oriented against neighboring Denmark. A small vessel, armed with a battery of only three light guns, Cyclop served during the three wars of German unification; during the first, the Second Schleswig War on 1864, she guarded the Prussian coastline but saw no action. She supported the army's campaign against the Kingdom of Hanover during the Austro-Prussian War of 1866, and she defended the Elbe for the duration of the Franco-Prussian War of 1870–1871, but again took part in no battles.

Badly deteriorated by 1872, she was stricken from the naval register in March that year and reconstructed into an iron-hulled gunboat. Recommissioned in 1875, she thereafter served abroad to protect German economic interests overseas. The first deployment, from 1875 to 1881, sent the ship to East Asia, where she operated against Chinese pirates and helped to create maps of the area. A second voyage overseas followed from 1882 to 1883, this time to the Mediterranean Sea, initially in response to the ʻUrabi revolt in Egypt. She served in secondary roles thereafter, including as a fishery protection ship, before being deployed overseas for a third time in 1885, now to the new German colony of Kamerun in Africa. Cyclop participated in the suppression of revolts against German rule and conducted surveys of the colony. Badly worn out by 1888, she was stricken again and converted into a floating workshop and a storage hulk at Suellaba, Kamerun. After the British overran the colony in 1914 during World War I, the ship was seized and sold to ship breakers.

== Design ==
The Camäleon class came about as a result of a program to strengthen the Prussian Navy in the late 1850s in the aftermath of the dissolution of the Reichsflotte and in the midst of rising tensions with Denmark. In 1859, Prince Regent Wilhelm approved a construction program for some fifty-two steam gunboats to be built over the next fifteen years, of which eight became the Camäleon class. They were similar to the contemporaneous Jäger-class gunboats, but were substantially larger vessels. These ships were intended to defend the Prussian coast in the event of another war with Denmark.

Cyclop was 43.28 meters (142 ft) long, with a beam of 6.96 m (22 ft 10 in) and a draft of 2.67 m (8 ft 9 in). She displaced 422 metric tons (415 long tons) at full load. The ship's crew consisted of 4 officers and 67 enlisted men. She was powered by a single marine steam engine that drove one 3-bladed screw propeller, with steam provided by two coal-fired trunk boilers, which gave her a top speed of 9.1 knots (16.9 km/h; 10.5 mph) at 250 metric horsepower (250 ihp). As built, she was equipped with a three-masted schooner rig. The ship was armed with a battery of one rifled 15 cm (5.9 in) 24-pounder gun and two rifled 12 cm (4.7 in) 12-pounder guns.

== Service history ==
=== Construction – 1868 ===
The keel for Cyclop was laid down in 1859 at the Königliche Werft (Royal Dockyard) in Danzig, and she was launched on 8 September 1860. Normally, new ships underwent sea trials upon completion, but budgetary shortages prevented the Prussian Navy from running a thorough examination of the vessel. Instead, the crew was limited to what could be observed during the short trip from Danzig to the naval arsenal at Dänholm off Stralsund. Upon arrival, she was laid up. The Prussian Navy planned to reactivate Cyclop in December 1863 owing to rising tensions between Prussia and Austria of the German Confederation and Denmark over the latter's November Constitution, which integrated the duchies of Schleswig, Holstein, and Lauenburg with Denmark, a violation of the London Protocol that had ended the First Schleswig War. Crew shortages and poor weather prevented Cyclop from being commissioned until January 1864.

Following the outbreak of the Second Schleswig War in February, Cyclop served as the flagship of the III Division, which helped to defend the Prussian coast from the superior Danish fleet. In April, the III Division was deactivated and the gunboats were transferred to the Reserve Division. After the war, Cyclop took part in a naval review held for King Wilhelm I, followed by a tour of ports in Holstein with now Konteradmiral (Rear Admiral) Jachmann. On 15 September, Cyclop arrived in the new Prussian naval base at Kiel. In late 1864, she became the guard ship at the entrance to the Eider Canal, and she remained in this role through early 1866. During this period, in 1865, the boat's 24-pounder was replaced with a rifled 21 cm (8.3 in) 68-pounder gun. On 14 January 1866, Cyclop was transferred to the coastal fortification at Friedrichsort outside Kiel, along with the gunboat Scorpion and several cannon-armed shallops; these units formed the II Company of the Naval Artillery Division.

Wilhelm I ordered the Navy to begin mobilization on 15 May as war with Austria became likely, leading to the Austro-Prussian War, which broke out in June. Cyclop was transferred to the North Sea along with the ironclad Arminius, which led the North Sea Flotilla of gunboats that was commanded by then-Korvettenkapitän (KK—Corvette Captain) Reinhold von Werner. For the duration of the conflict, the flotilla operated out of Geestemünde. Without a naval threat from Austria, the Prussian navy therefore concentrated its effort against the Kingdom of Hanover. On 15 June, Cyclop, Arminius and the gunboat Tiger covered the crossing of the Elbe river by General Edwin von Manteuffel and some 13,500 soldiers to attack the city of Hanover. From mid-July to early October, Cyclop served as the tender to the frigate Gefion. Cyclop returned to Dänholm on 14 October and was decommissioned there.

=== 1869–1874 ===
Cyclop remained out of service until 22 March 1869, when she was reactivated for service first as a guard ship in Kiel. She conducted a survey off Hörup Haff and Alsen for a shooting range for the old frigate Thetis, then assigned to the artillery school. In mid-June, Cyclop and two tugboats towed a 40-metric-ton (39-long-ton) floating crane from the AG Vulcan shipyard in Stettin to the Königliche Werft in Kiel. She then took part in the annual fleet maneuvers in August and September, after which her crew was reduced in Kiel for the remainder of the year. In early 1870, Cyclop helped pull the armored frigate Friedrich Carl free after she ran aground off the island of Langeland and towed her to Kiel for repairs. The damage proved to be too extensive for the Königliche Werft to complete, and so Friedrich Carl had to be towed to Britain; Cyclop escorted the ship through the Skagerrak.

After France declared war on Prussia in July 1870, initiating the Franco-Prussian War, Cyclop and two smaller gunboats were transferred to guard the mouth of the Elbe river. She remained there for the duration of the conflict but saw no action against the French Navy. After the Prussian victory in 1871, which saw the creation of the German Empire, along with the Imperial German Navy, she returned to her previous role as a tender in Kiel. During the year, she assisted in the transfer of a new floating dry dock from Swinemünde to Kiel in company with the ironclad Kronprinz and the paddle steamer Preussischer Adler. Repeated, negative experiences with Danish pilots led the Imperial Navy to send Cyclop to assist with navigation off Langeland. In August, Cyclop served as a tender to the aviso Pommerania, which had returned from a scientific expedition.

On 11 November, Cyclop was scheduled to begin an overhaul in Danzig, but an inspection of the hull revealed it to be in too poor a condition. Accordingly, she was stricken from the naval register on 19 March 1872 to be rebuilt. Her old wooden hull was broken up and a new iron frame was constructed. The completed vessel was re-launched on 5 August 1874, though some historians, including Hans Hildebrand, Albert Röhr, and Hans-Otto Steinmetz do not consider the iron-hulled ship to be the same vessel.

=== 1875–1881 ===
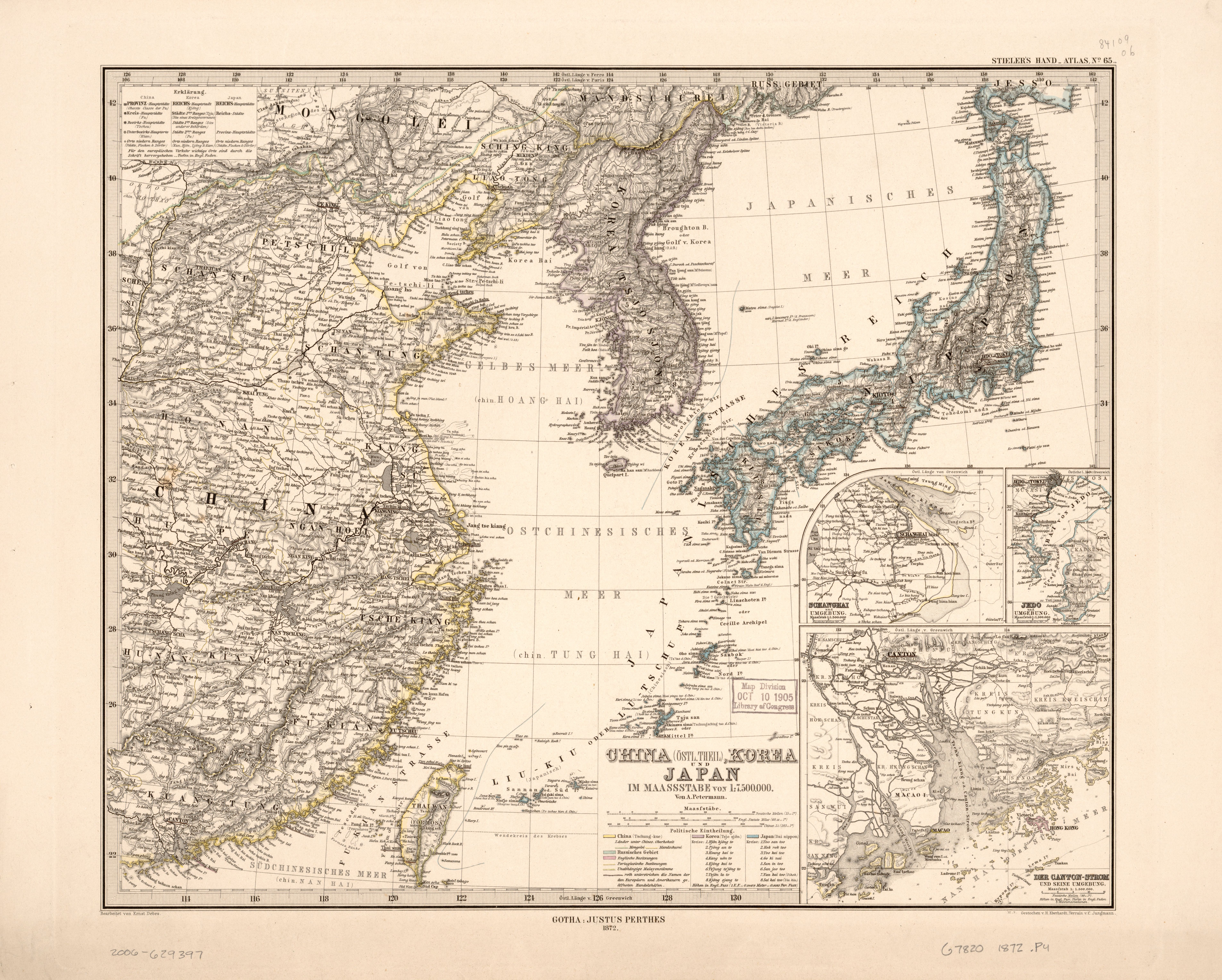
German 1872 map of China, Japan, and Korea

Cyclop was recommissioned for service overseas on 27 March 1875. The ship thereafter conducted sea trials that lasted into early May. Her crew thereafter began preparations for a deployment to East Asian waters, which began on 9 May with her departure from Germany. At that time, Chinese pirates threatened European merchant vessels in the region, and Cyclop was sent to protect German ships; her shallow draft would also permit her to enter Chinese rivers to attack pirate groups. She reached Singapore on 17 July, and while there, the ship received orders to make a courtesy visit to the king of Siam. Cyclop thereafter arrived in Hong Kong on 9 August, where she met the screw frigate Hertha and the screw corvette Ariadne. The cruiser unit there was at that time commanded by Eduard von Knorr aboard Ariadne.

The ship's first operation in Chinese waters began on 27 September, while the gunboat was in Amoy. The schooner Anna had been seized and run aground by a group of Chinese pirates at Fuzhou, who had murdered the ship's captain and helmsman. Cyclop sent a landing party ashore, who found the pirates, who were in possession of part of the schooner's cargo. (Note: According to the historians Hildebrand, Röhr, and Steinmetz, Cyclop's crew "punished them" but they provide no further elaboration.) Knorr planned further anti-piracy operations in the area, but the German ambassador in Beijing intervened to prevent an escalation between Germany and China, leading to the chief of the Kaiserliche Admiralität (Imperial Admiralty), Albrecht von Stosch, to issue new orders that restricted the ability of German naval commanders in the region to act.

In February 1876, Cyclop sailed to Taiping Island in the South China Sea; she carried a memorial that was sent to commemorate the assistance given to the crew of the schooner F.S. Robertson, which had been wrecked on the island three years earlier on 8 July 1873. The local populace had come to the aid of the ship's crew, treated the injured, and helped to salvage the cargo, and the government had refused any reward from the German shipping company. Otto von Bismarck, then the German Chancellor, suggested to Wilhelm I that a monument be sent instead to recognize the efforts to help the crew. The monument arrived in early 1876, and Cyclop carried it to Taiping Island, helping to erect it there on 22 March. Cyclop departed two days later and sailed to Hong Kong, where she met Ariadne and Hertha. There, they awaited the arrival of the screw frigate Vineta, whose commander, Alexander von Monts, replaced Knorr as the local commander.

Hertha and Ariadne thereafter returned to Germany, being replaced by the corvette Luise and the gunboat Nautilus; the four ships were thereafter organized as a squadron. Cyclop remained on station in East Asia through 1880, and during this period, she cruised throughout the region, visiting major ports as far north as Siberia and conducting hydrographic and topographical surveys. The ship typically spent the winter months at Tianjin. At the time, the ship's white paint was unusual, which led to her nickname "the white gunboat" among the crews of other warships in the region. By late 1880, the ship was in need of a thorough overhaul, and so she was relieved by the gunboat Iltis. On 1 January 1881, Cyclop began the voyage back to Germany, arriving in Kiel on 28 April, where she was laid up for an overhaul at the Kaiserliche Werft there.

=== 1882–1914 ===
Cyclop was recommissioned after the completion of the overhaul on 1 April 1882. She was initially assigned to fishery protection duties in the North Sea. While in Wilhelmshaven, she received orders on 7 August for a cruise to the eastern Mediterranean Sea, where she would join Germany's response to the ʻUrabi revolt in Egypt, which also included the screw corvettes Nymphe and Gneisenau, the aviso Zieten, and the gunboats Möwe and Habicht. In June 1882, the revolutionaries, led by Ahmed ‘Urabi and angered by foreign influence in the country, murdered fifty Europeans, prompting the British Royal Navy to bombard Alexandria and then land forces to pursue the rebels. In the wake of the conflict, the German government determined that warships should be sent to protect Germans in the country. Cyclop arrived in Port Said, Egypt, on 2 October and she remained in the region, based in Alexandria, into January 1883.

While in Egypt, Cyclop embarked Field Marshall Prince Friedrich Karl from Suez to El Tor, Egypt, where he made a visit to the interior. Cyclop provided three armed sailors as a bodyguard. Friedrich Karl returned to the ship at Suez, and on 12 February, she took him to Jaffa. In April, she cruised off the coast of Marmarica, where she conducted shooting practice. A scholar, Professor Schweinfurth, was aboard the ship at that time to conduct studies of ports in the region. On 1 May, the admiralty ordered Cyclop to return to Germany as the situation in Egypt had calmed, and she arrived back in Wilhelmshaven on 21 July. She returned to fishery protection duties on 19 August, which lasted through most of 1884. Increased competition between fishing vessels in the North Sea led to attacks on German boats by British sailors, prompting the German government to intervene diplomatically. Tensions had reduced by August 1884, allowing Cyclop to take part in the annual fleet maneuvers later that month and into September. On 30 September, the ship was decommissioned in Wilhelmshaven.

The admiralty had intended for Cyclop to remain in service for fishery protection duties in 1885, but by that time, small warships were needed to enforce the German colony in Kamerun, which had recently been seized. Before she could depart, Cyclop was taken into the shipyard to have her ventilation improved for service in the tropics. The ship got underway on 23 April and arrived at Duala, Kamerun, on 6 July. At around the same time, the only major warship on the station, the screw corvette Bismarck, left for German East Africa, leaving Cyclop in company with just Habicht. Cyclop then cruised along the coast to conduct cartographic surveys of the colony. The crew suffered in the tropical climate, and malaria was a particularly significant problem. Many men were hospitalized at Suellaba and later at Joss. The experience led the admiralty to decide to replace crews on the station after one year instead of the normal two-year rotation.

In February 1886, Cyclop went to Bimbia to suppress a revolt against German rule. The ship returned to Duala to be present for the ceremonial beginning construction of the colonial government building with the first imperial governor, Julius von Soden. The ship next visited Saint Helena from 10 to 16 September. In early October, the ship was intentionally grounded in the mouth of the Wouri River so the crew could perform maintenance on the hull. Cyclop later went to Luanda in Portuguese Angola for additional repairs that lasted into January 1887. From early April to the end of May, Cyclop was involved in the adjustment of the border between Kamerun and British Nigeria. The town of Bonny was at that time claimed by Germany as part of Kamerun, but it was surrounded on three sides by Nigeria, and Germany exchanged it in return for adjustments elsewhere. Men from Cyclop were given the honor of carrying out the formal transfer.

On 10 June 1888, Cyclop sent a detachment of armed sailors to escort a scientific expedition into the interior of Kamerun. Heavy attacks by local rebels soon forced the expedition to turn back. By that time, the ship's propulsion system was badly worn out, and she was capable of steaming at just 2 knots (3.7 km/h; 2.3 mph); given her age, it was decided that an overhaul of her machinery would be cost prohibitive. The navy ordered she be converted into a hulk for use as a floating hospital, ammunition storage, and a work station on 6 September, and on 25 September, she was again struck from the naval register. She nevertheless remained in service to assist in the suppression of a rebellion at Batanga. On 1 November, she was disarmed and placed out of service. She was anchored at Suellaba with a crew of one deck officer and several sailors. Her masts and machinery were removed in 1900. In 1914, Britain invaded Kamerun early in World War I, and after they conquered the colony, they seized Cyclop and sold her to ship breakers.
