= Ariane Müller =

German pianist

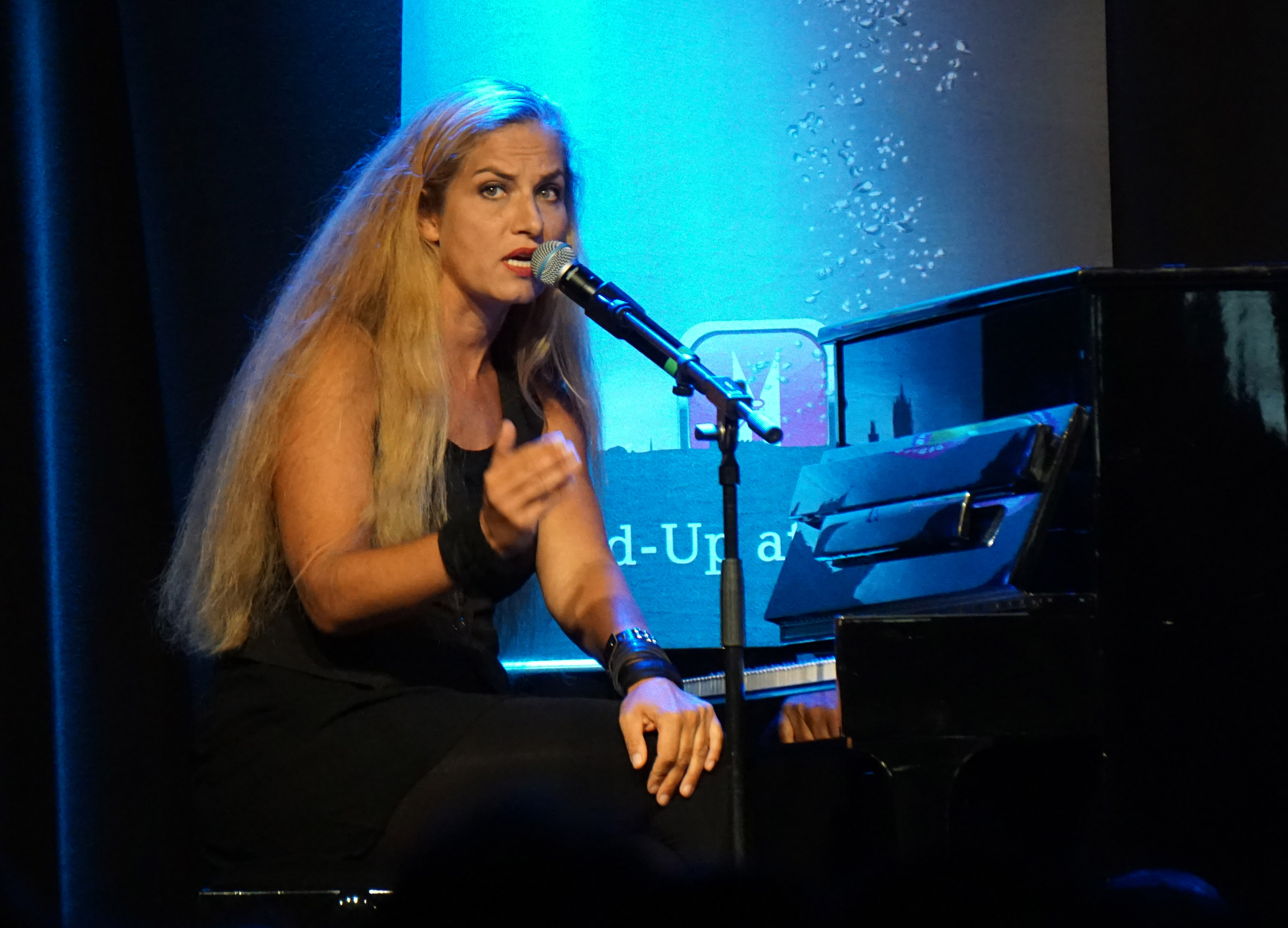
Ariane Müller, 2019

Ariane T. Müller (born 4 June 1980 in Ulm) is a German pianist, band leader and musical comedienne.

== Education and career ==
Müller's mother is a physician from Berlin and her father a teacher from Swabia. She is a distant relative of the singer-songerwriter Reinhard Mey. Müller grew up in the city of Ulm in Southern Germany. She received piano lessons from the age of six and guitar lesson from the age of 13. Since the age of 14 she started to participate in various musical projects. Among others she played the hammond organ in a local blues rock band and the bass guitar in a local punk band. She also started composing her own songs and tried her hand in the singer-songwriter genre. After graduating from high school Müller earned a degree in social studies at distance teaching university but decided later to become a professional musician.

Müller worked as the musical director for the Theater Ulm and among others led the productions of the musicals The Rocky Horror Show (2011) und Hair (2013). She became a co-founder of a new theater located in the Fortress of Ulm. There she organized musical and gala event and collaborated with the British singer Henrik Wager. During her work at the Rocky Horror Show she met the singer Julia Gámez Martin and in 2013 they formed the musical comedy duo Suchtpotenzial. With Suchtpotenzial she received a number of comedy awards and performed streaming concerts during the COVID-19 pandemic.

In November 2023 Müller started a petition to ban the rock band Böhsen Onkelz from performing in her hometown of Ulm. Müller argued that due to band's past association with the right-wing extremism and violence still being perpetrated by fans it is not appropriate to have them playing in a multicultural city like Ulm and that such an event would endanger public safety.

== Private life ==
Müller has 2 daughters, who sing on their own under the label "Müller sisters" and sometimes support their mother as background singers during musical performances.
