= Gastein Convention =

1865 treaty between Austria and Prussia

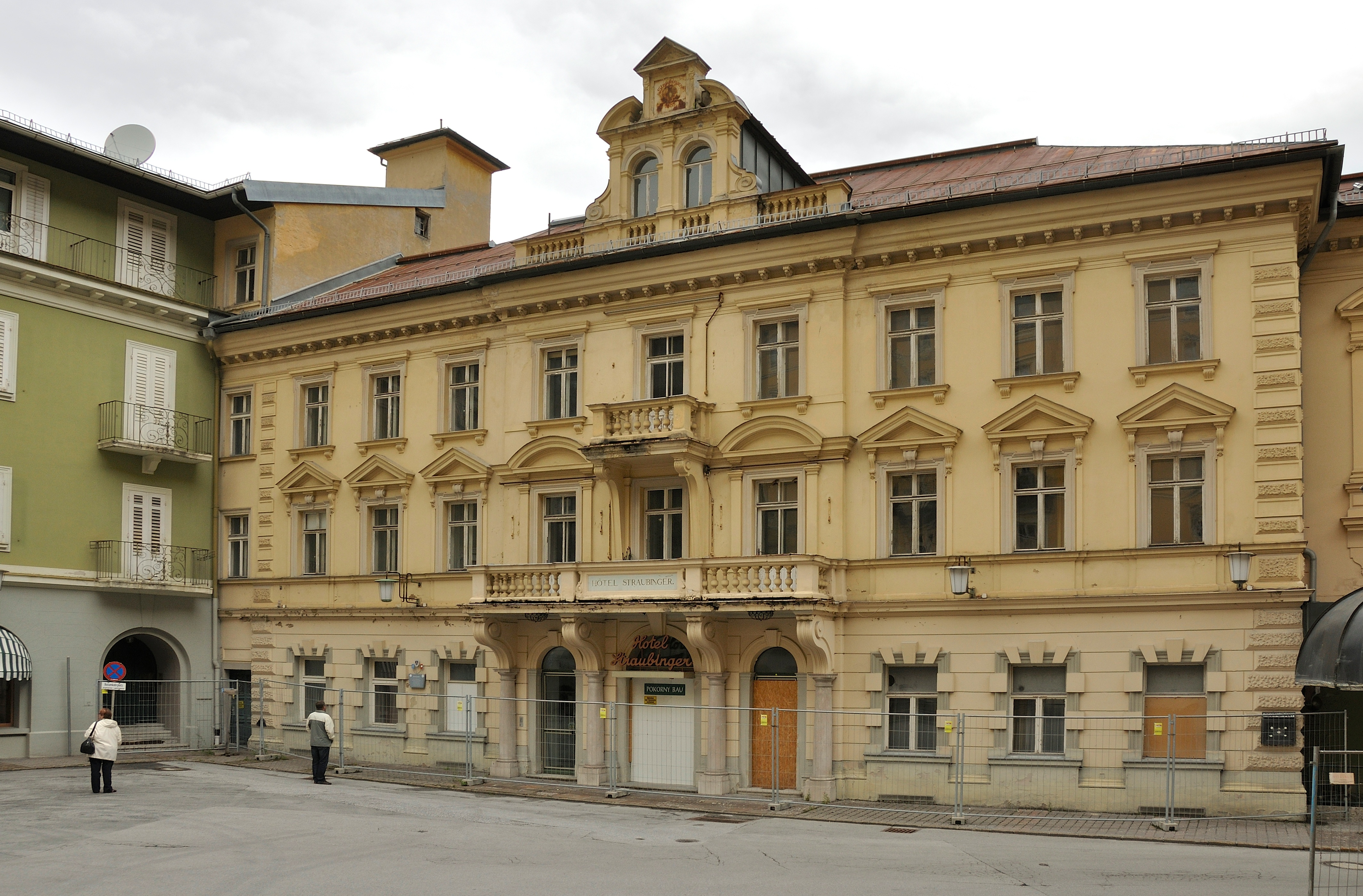
- Hotel Straubinger, Bad Gastein
- Type: Treaty
- Signed: 14 August 1865
- Location: Bad Gastein, Salzburg, Austria
- Signatories: Austrian Empire; Kingdom of Prussia

The Gastein Convention (German: Gasteiner Konvention), also called the Convention of Badgastein, was a treaty signed at Bad Gastein in Austria on 14 August 1865. It embodied agreements between the two principal powers of the German Confederation, Prussia and Austria, over the governing of the 'Elbe Duchies' of Schleswig, Holstein and Saxe-Lauenburg.

== Background ==
Schleswig (until 1864 Danish fief), Holstein and Lauenburg (until 1864 German Confederation)

The Duchies of Schleswig and Holstein had been united under Danish rule since 1460. While Schleswig north of the Eider River was a Danish fief, the Duchies of Holstein officially remained an estate of the Holy Roman Empire which the Kings of Denmark held as an Imperial fief. In 1815 King Frederick VI of Denmark also acquired the adjacent Duchy of Saxe-Lauenburg. Both Holstein and Lauenburg were member states of the German Confederation since 1815.

When in 1858 the Danish national liberal Council President Carl Christian Hall drafted the 'November Constitution' in order to link Schleswig more closely to the Danish kingdom, he sparked German protests, and troops of the German Confederation eventually occupied Holstein and Lauenburg in 1863. In the following Second Schleswig War, Denmark was defeated and according to the Treaty of Vienna signed on 30 October 1864 had to cede the Elbe Duchies to victorious Prussia and Austria.

After the war, the two powers faced the issue of governing the provinces formerly held by the Danish royal House of Glücksburg in personal union. Prussia aimed at the annexation of the territories as provinces with her state territory, against the strong resistance of the Austrians, who persisted on the status of autonomous duchies of the Confederation ruled as a condominium. To ease tensions, the Prussian minister-president Otto von Bismarck met with the Austrian envoy Gustav von Blome at the spa town of Bad Gastein in the Austrian Alps.

== Content ==
In the negotiations, the administration of the gained territories was split between the two powers: Prussia would rule over Schleswig and Austria over Holstein. Austria would officially renounce Saxe-Lauenburg, which would be ruled by the Prussian king in personal union for a purchase price of 2.5 million Danish rigsdalers.

The eleven articles of the agreement signed on 14 August 1865 covered:

- abandoning the shared administration (condominium) of Schleswig and Holstein
- Prussian control of Schleswig
- Austrian control of Holstein (which was sandwiched between Schleswig to the north and Prussian Lauenburg to the south)
- the Prussian crown purchasing Austria's right to Lauenburg
- Prussian transit rights on military roads through Holstein to Schleswig
- Prussian rights to construct a canal and a telegraph-line through Holstein to Schleswig
- setting up a German Confederation Navy
- designating a headquarters for the proposed navy at Kiel in Holstein under Prussian sovereignty
- designating Rendsburg as a Fortress of the German Confederation.

The treaty was ratified by both parties on 19 August. King William I of Prussia went on to rule Lauenburg in personal union and assumed the ducal title.

== Aftermath ==
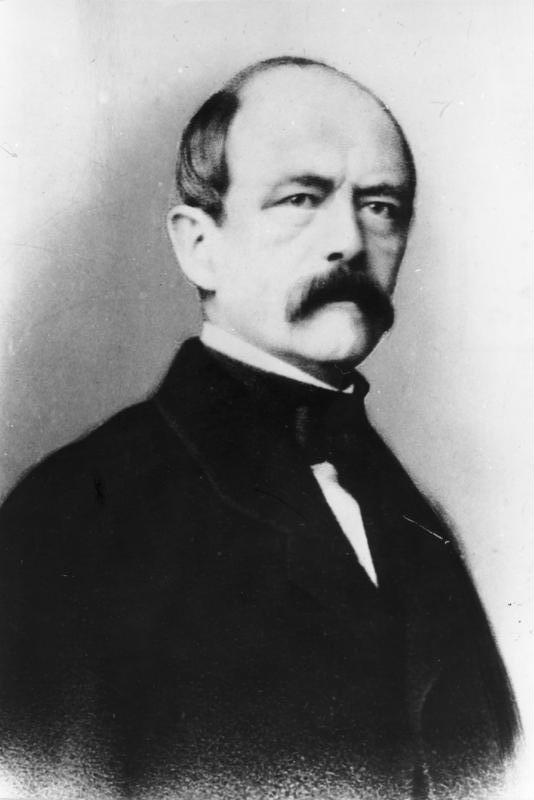
Prime Minister Bismarck, 1862

Bismarck's negotiation skills had apparently been underestimated by Blome. Though Prussia benefitted from the treaty, the minister-president noted that the 'bonding of cracks' did not answer the German question nor did it ease the Austria–Prussia rivalry. Moreover the treaty ran counter to the legal basis of the German Confederation, which led to the refusal by the smaller Confederation states and turned out detrimental to the reputation especially of the Austrian side. The European powers reacted strongly, the French emperor Napoleon III responded with protest, while the British saw their interests in the North Sea as threatened; the treaty was nevertheless appreciated by Russia in view of her enmity with Austria after the Crimean War.

The Gastein Convention marked the end of all attempts to seek a peaceful solution of the German question. It soon collapsed due to Bismarck's successful efforts to provoke a war with the Austrian Empire as well as to eliminate Austria from the German Confederation. The Austrian government had tolerated the rule of Duke Frederick VIII of Schleswig-Holstein, much to the chagrin of Prussia. On 1 June 1866 Austria asked the Federal Convention for a resolution on the status of Holstein, which Prussia regarded as a breach of the mutual agreement. Under this pretext, Prussian troops entered Holstein nine days later which led to the outbreak of the Austro-Prussian War, also known as the Seven Weeks' War.

The Peace of Prague in 1866 confirmed Denmark's cession of Schleswig and Holstein, which were both annexed by Prussia, but promised a plebiscite to decide whether north Schleswig wished to return to Danish rule. This provision was bilaterally set aside by a resolution of Prussia and Austria-Hungary in 1878. Instead the Prussian Province of Schleswig-Holstein was created in 1868. Both territories were to be admitted to the Zollverein (German Customs Union), headed by Prussia, of which Austria was not a member.
