= Oberer Kuhberg concentration camp =

Concentration camp in Nazi Germany

Coordinates: 48.3822°N 9.9506°E

Oberer Kuhberg concentration camp was a concentration camp built and operated by Nazi Germany on the site of Fort Oberer Kuhberg.

== History as a fort ==
Fort Oberer Kuhberg was built from 1848 to 1857 as part of the Fortress of Ulm. It was used until the 20th century and is one of the biggest forts in Europe. It was fit to hold 5,000 soldiers in peacetime, and up to 20,000 in wartime. It contains the Ulm Minster, the tallest church in the world.

== History as a concentration camp ==
It was repurposed as a concentration camp for political dissidents from November 1933 to July 1935. It held more than 600 political prisoners during this time. The purpose of the camp was to intimidate those who opposed the Nazi regime. One notable prisoner was Kurt Schumacher, a politician who became the leader of the Social Democratic Party from May 1946 to August 1952.

Today, Oberer Kuhberg lives on as a museum. It is mostly intact, and many parts of the former camp are open to visitors.

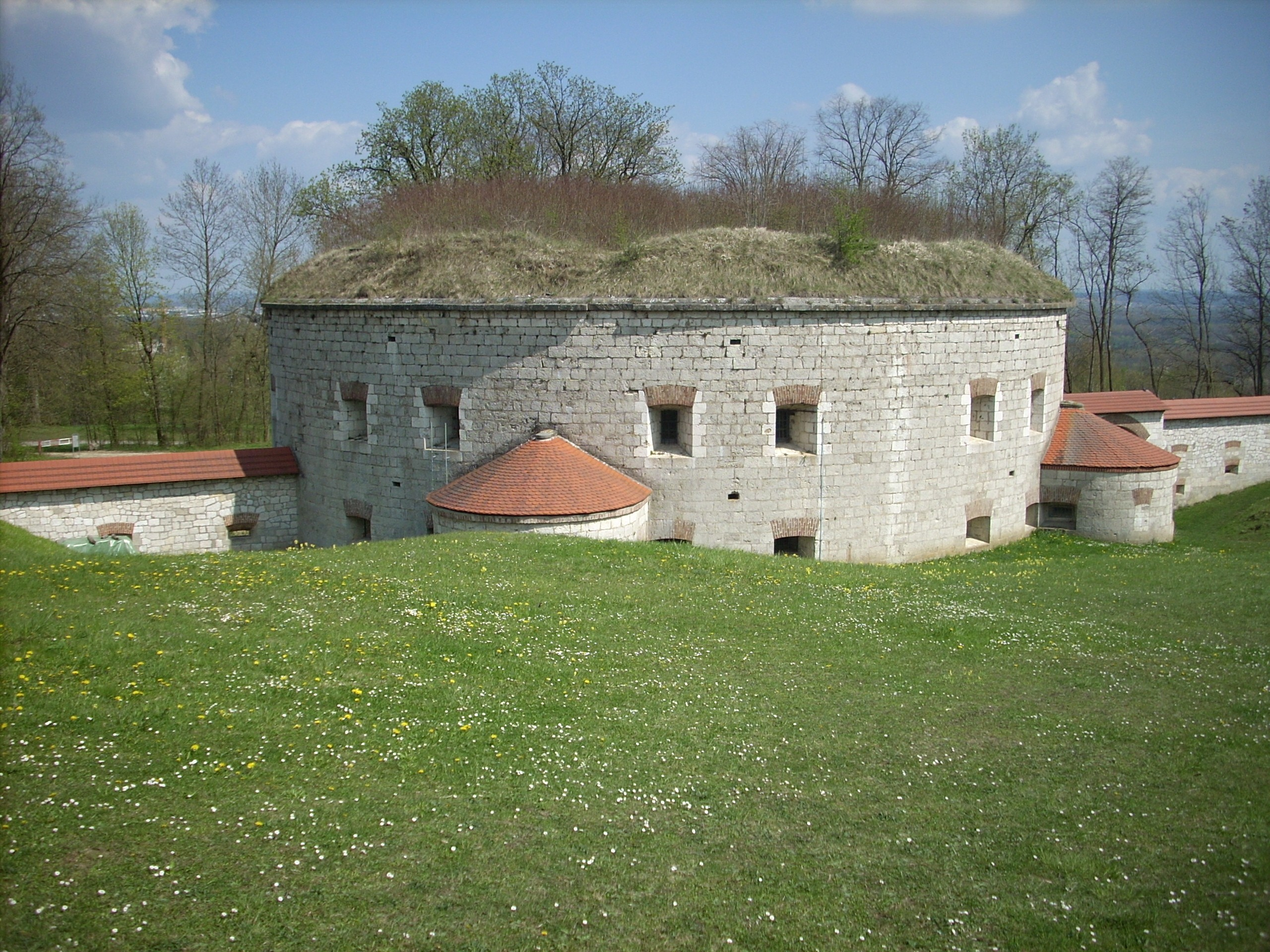
Fairground

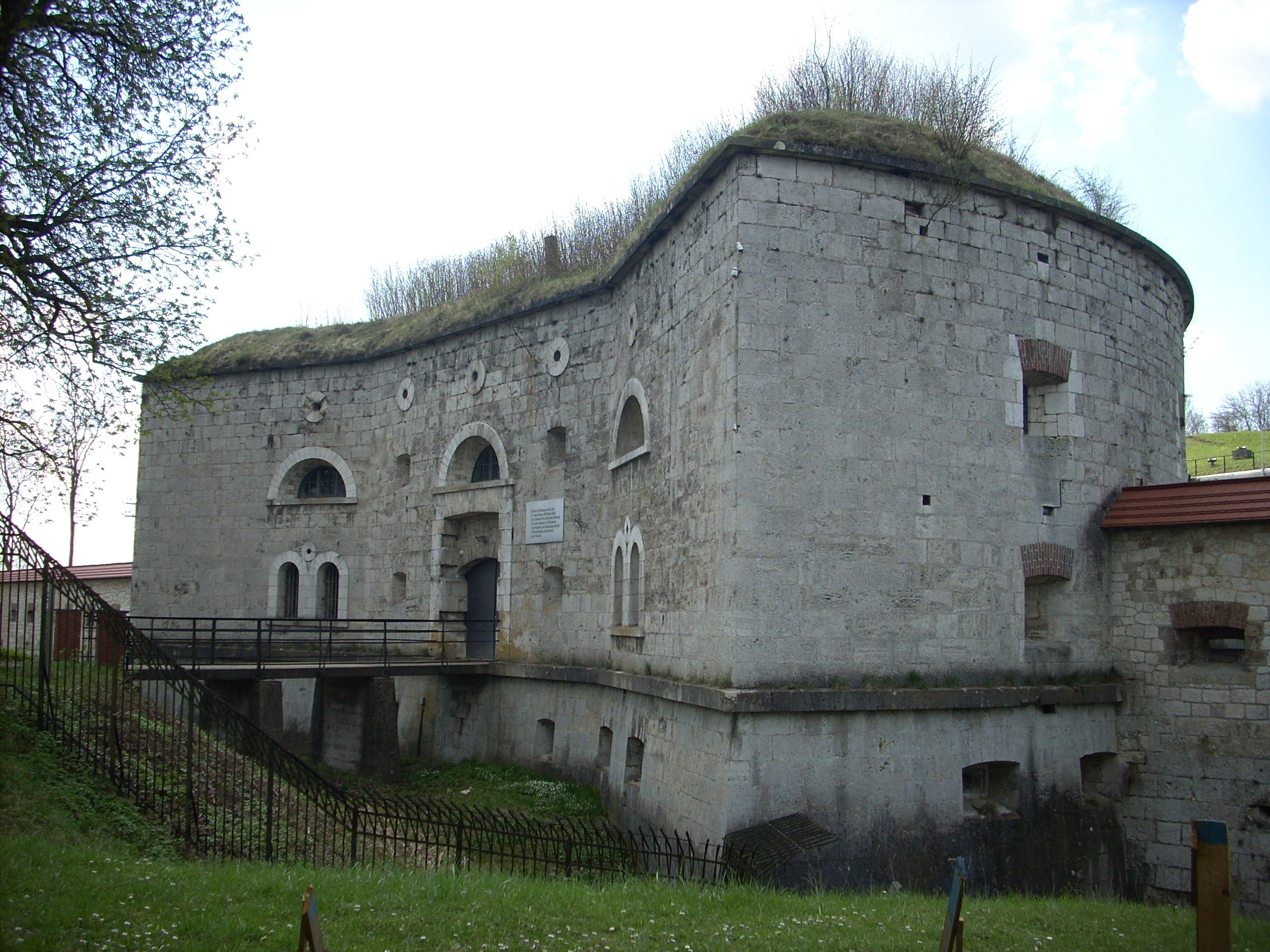
Reduit

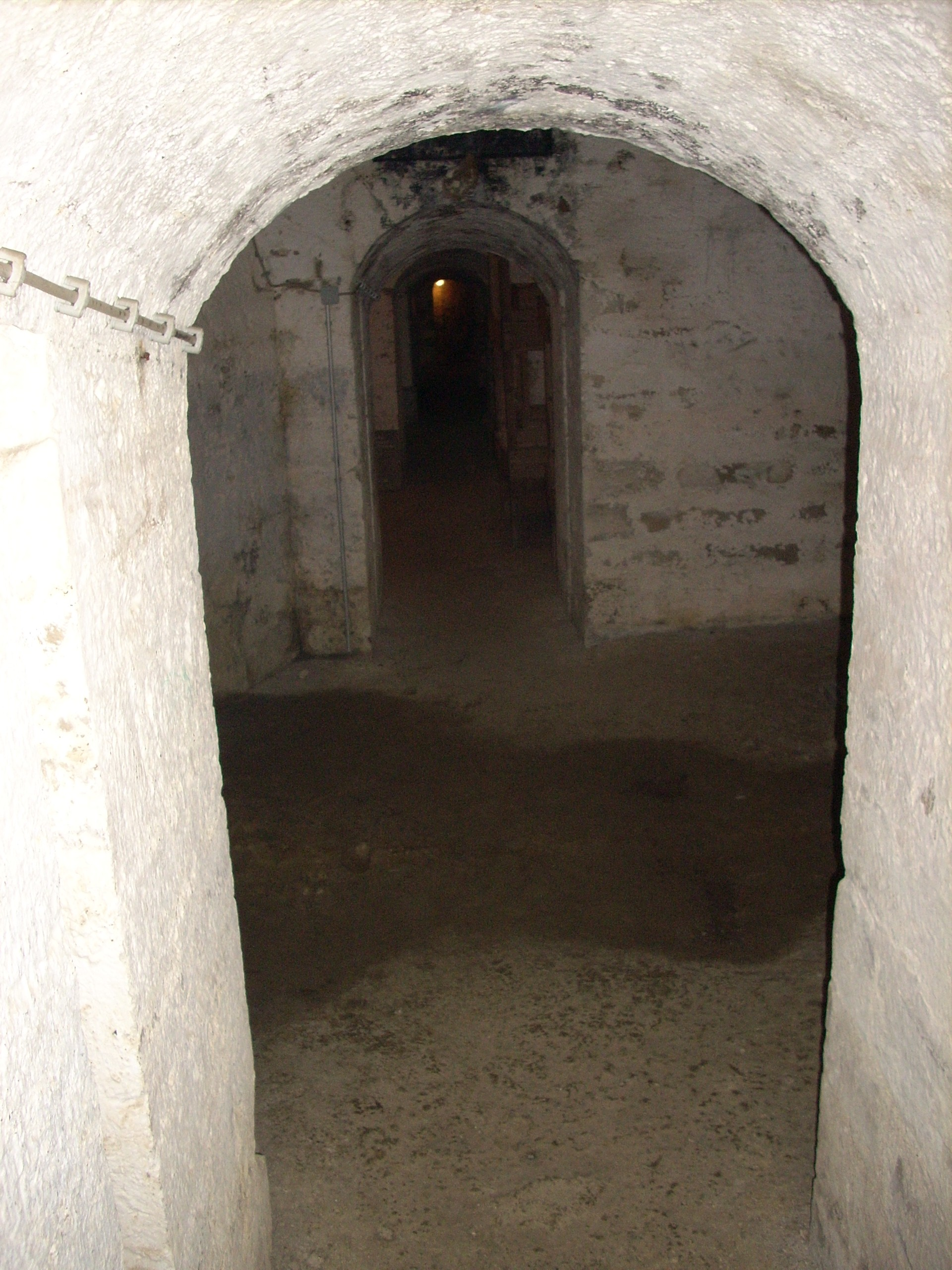
Example of a cell

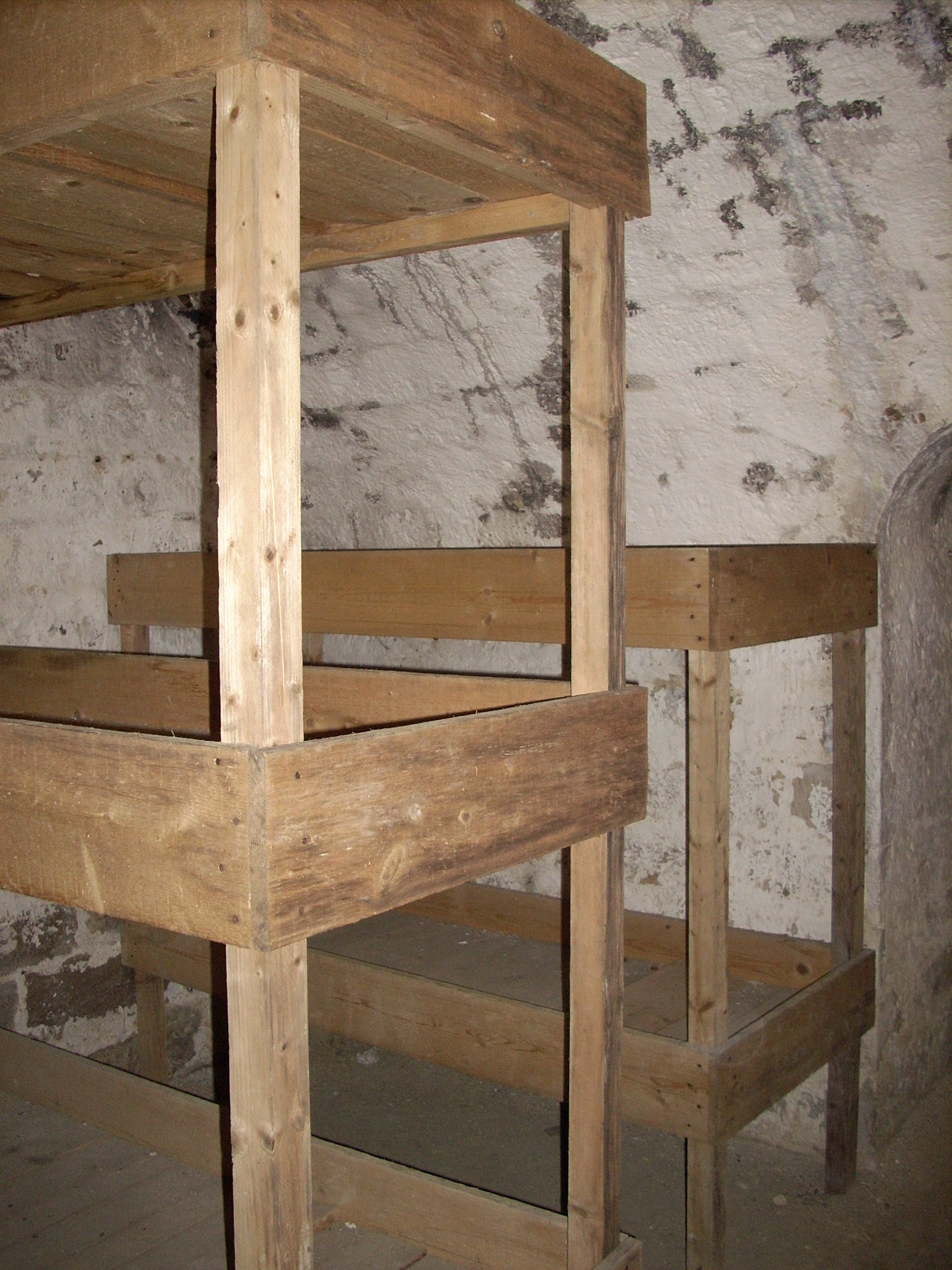
Replica of prisoner's beds
