= Fortresses of the German Confederation =

Under the terms of the 1815 Peace of Paris, France was obliged to pay for the construction of a line of fortresses to protect the German Confederation against any future aggression by France. All fortresses were located outside Austria and Prussia — the two biggest, bickering powers of the Confederation.

Section C. "Defensive System of the Germanic Confederation" of the protocol drawn up at Paris on 3 November 1815, declared Mainz, Luxembourg, and Landau to be fortresses belonging to the Confederation, and stipulated that a fourth should be constructed on the Upper Rhine. In conformity with this act, a portion of the funds, which France was compelled to pay by way of indemnity for the cost of placing her on a peaceable footing, was thus appropriated: £200,000 were set aside for completing the works at Mainz; £800,000 were assigned to Prussia, to be applied upon its fortresses on the Lower Rhine; another £800,000 were reserved for constructing the new federal fortress on the Upper Rhine; and Bavaria was allowed £600,000 towards erecting another strong place on the Rhine, at Germersheim or some other point.

By 1835 the works about Mainz were completed; the twin fortresses of Koblenz and Ehrenbreitstein, and Cologne had been abundantly strengthened on the side of Prussia; and, on the Bavarian side, the fortress of Germersheim was in a state to defend the passage on the Upper Rhine. The western frontier of Germany had, in this way, been provided with a formidable line of defences against possible hostile actions by their neighbours. The eastern side of Germany has been additionally fortified by the erection of a strong citadel at Posen; and the southern was to be still further protected by the formidable works in course of construction at Brixen in the Tyrol.

The fortress of Ulm became a major strategic fortress able to accommodate 100,000 men and their equipment. Since the Kingdom of Württemberg had no engineering corps King William I appointed Moritz Karl Ernst von Prittwitz, a Prussian major, as the supervisor to oversee the building the fortresses. His plans included the provisions for the prospective development of the city Ulm. Major Theodor von Hildebrandt was appointed to oversee the building of fortresses around Neu-Ulm on the Bavarian side of the Danube.

== History ==
At the Treaty of Paris in 1815 the four victorious powers Austria, the United Kingdom, Prussia and the Russian Empire named the cities Mainz, Luxembourg and Landau to fortresses of the German Confederation on 3 November 1815. An additional article to the Federal War Constitution (Bundeskriegsverfassung) on 11 July 1822 enacted the Confederation's obligations under the treaty.

The takeover of the fortresses by the Confederation took place after a significant delay. Control over Federal Fortress of Mainz was acquired on 15 December 1825, the Federal Fortress of Luxembourg on 13 March 1826 and the Federal Fortress of Landau on 27 January 1831. These older forts were supplemented by two new ones Federal Fortress of Rastatt in 1841 and the Federal Fortress of Ulm in 1842. It was agreed at the Gastein Convention in 1865 that Rendsburg would become a federal fortress but due to the dissolution of the Confederation in 1866 that never happened.

The fortresses were directly subject to the Federal Assembly (Bundesversammlung) of the Confederation and the Federal Military Commission (Bundesmilitärkommission). The Fortress of Koblenz was the role model for the fortification, being a system of fortress works designed as a polygonal system and developed by Prussia.

The fortresses were at the beginning of the Confederation the only effective sign of competence by central federal authorities. The double-headed eagle, symbol of the Confederation, was embossed on all artillery.

== Function ==
The military function of the fortresses was primarily to secure the western border against France. Fortresses took a central position in the federal defence conception during the first half of the 19th century. The Federal Fortresses (Bundesfestungen) should cover the concentration of the Federal Army (Bundesheer), if a war broke out, force the opponent to time-robbing sieges and should be an operation base for own defensive acts.

Due to their often exposed and unfavourable locations the fortresses only gained importance with the cooperation with other fortresses of the individual German states, especially the Prussian fortress system at the Rhine.

== Administration ==
The Fortress Governor (Festungsgouverneur) was responsible for the administration of a federal fortress, the Fortress Commandant (Festungskommandant) for the military administration. Both were named by that head of state, which provided the majority of troops in a fortress. Both the Governor and the Commandant had to take an oath when taking over their responsibilities in a fortress, which obliged them to execute only the interests of the Confederation and its defence.

The Federal Matriculation Fund (Bundesmatrikularkasse) was established for the maintenance of the fortresses, financed by fees of the member states and 60 million francs of French reparations.

== Federal fortresses ==
=== Mainz ===
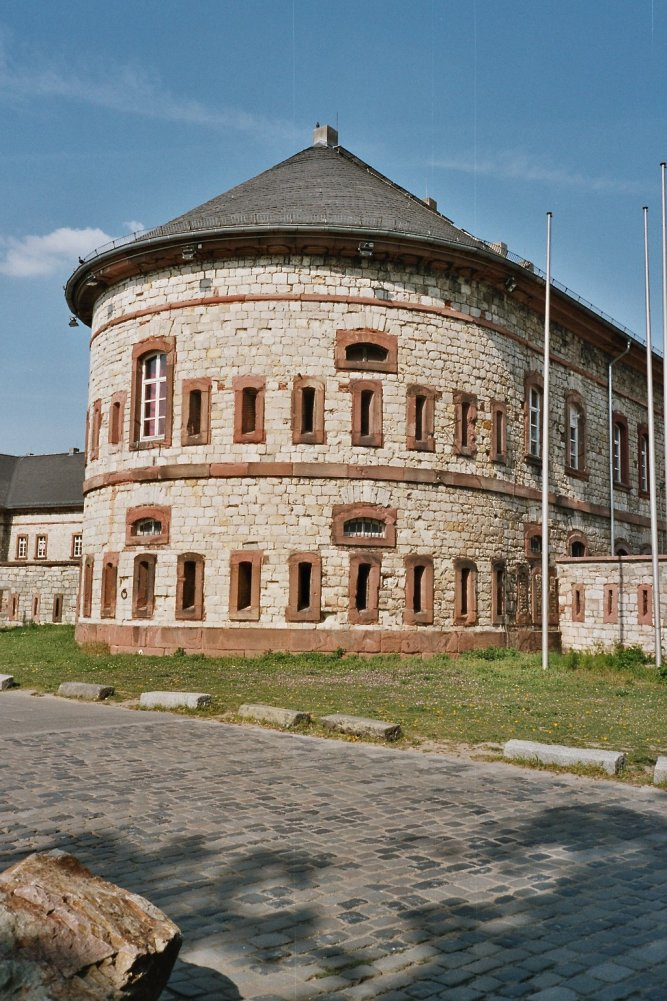
The Federal Fortress of Mainz

The garrison of the fortress of Mainz was to consist in peacetimes half of Prussian and half of Austrian troops according to the Carlsbad Decrees of 10 August 1817. Every five years the Commander was to be named in rotation by Prussia or Austria. Besides the 6,000 Austrians and Prussians there was also to be a 1,000 men strong Hessian battalion assigned to fill up the garrison. In fact this strength was never achieved. In the older core of the fortress there was not enough space for housing the full strength.

For wartimes the crew's strength should be 21,000 men. Besides of Austrians and Prussians the last third should come from the reserve division of the federal army according to a resolution of the Federal Assembly on 3 March 1831. The placement in the core of the fortress and the city wall wasn't even possible. Therefore, the detached forts in four cordons of fortresses on the surrounding hills were built as planned.

=== Luxembourg ===
The crew of the fortress of Luxembourg was to consist of Prussians to three quarters and of Dutchmen to one quarter. In the additional decree from 8 November 1816 the King of the United Netherlands, who was in personal union the Grand Duke of Luxembourg, gave Prussia the right to name the governor and the fortress commander for Luxembourg. Besides the required 4,000 men in peace times—a strength which was never achieved—there had to be additional 1,500 Prussians and 500 Dutchmen in wartime.

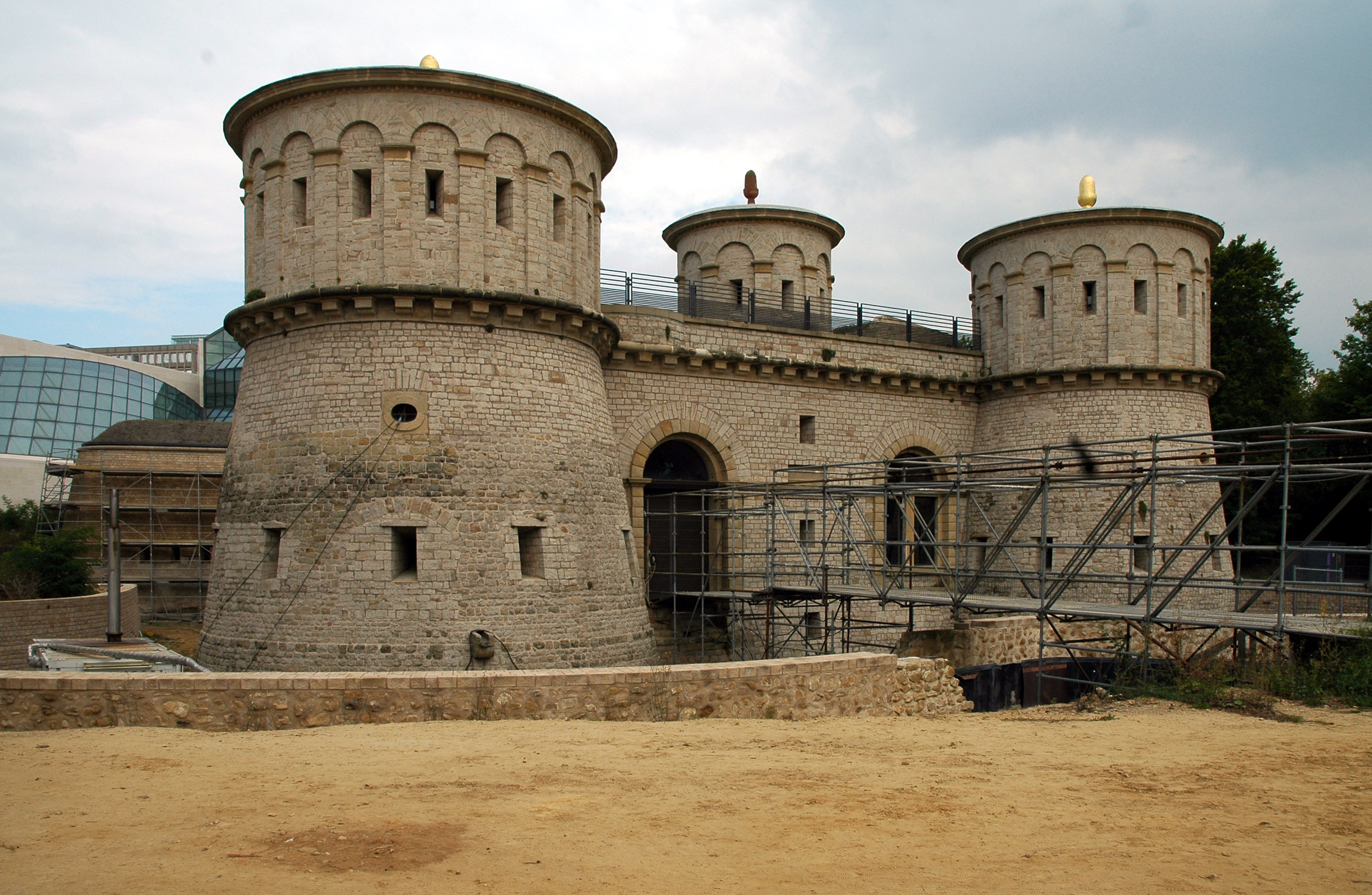
Fort Thüngen of the Fortress of Luxembourg

The strength of the wartime garrison of Luxembourg was therefore set at 7,000 men and 200 horses. These numbers were badly needed, as the fortress consisted of 22 forts, 15 of them in the middle cordon and 7 in the outer cordon. Into the rocks were built large-scale casemates and tunnels with an overall length of 22 km. This is why Luxembourg was called "Gibraltar of the North". As a diplomatic compromise over the Luxembourg Crisis it was agreed in the Treaty of London (1867) that the 24 Luxembourg forts and their outlying works would be demolished.

=== Landau ===
The peacetime crew consisted originally of 2,800 Bavarians. In the event of war Baden had to place one third of the 6,000 men wartime crew by request of Bavaria. After establishing the reserve infantry division of the Federal Army the structure was changed. On 3 March 1831 the Federal Assembly defined that the wartime crew should have a strength of 4,000 Bavarians to be completed by 2,300 men of the reserve division. The governor and commander were appointed by Bavaria.

The construction for a fortress around Landau had begun in 1688 according to plans of Sébastien le Prestre de Vauban and was continued in the 18th century. The small and in the 19th century outdated fortress consisted of a polygonal system, flanked by casemated towers. During the time of the German Confederation the fortress was enhanced by numerous detached forts.

=== New fortresses in Rastatt and Ulm ===
The discussion, which city was better for the ability of defence for the confederation, reached a polemic climax in the 1830s. Austria favoured the coverage of its own borders and a defensive concept for southern Germany in Ulm. The south German states instead favoured Rastatt to strengthen their own defence at the Upper Rhine. Prussia traditionally preferred the decisions of the south German states, because it was similar to its own safety politics.

In this stuck situation William I of Württemberg suggested the fortification of both cities. This position was seconded by the Prussian attorney of the Federal Military Commission (Bundesmilitärkommission). After long-winded negotiations he succeeded in convincing the King of Bavaria in August 1838, and in 1839 the Austrian attorney of the Federal Military Commission, of the plans. But a definite decree about the construction of the federal fortresses of Rastatt and Ulm only was made under the impact of the Rhine crisis. On 26 March 1841 the Federal Assembly decided to build both fortresses.

The construction of both fortresses represented the military compromise to equal the military strategic concept of Prussia and the south German states on the one side and the defensive concept of Austria on the other side. Both fortresses were at their time declared for invulnerable.

==== Rastatt ====
The federal fortress of Rastatt was completely in the hands of Grand Duchy of Baden. The Grand Duchy chose the administration. The peacetime crew consisted entirely of soldiers from Baden, in wartimes it was agreed that it would consist of two thirds of Baden and one third of Austrians. The construction of the fortress strengthened the military position of Prussia in southern Germany, because it supported the intention of Prussia to co-operate with the south German troops at the Rhine.

The main fortress surrounded the city of Baden and consisted of three forts (Ludwigfeste, Leopoldfeste and Friedrichfeste), which could be defended independently. Built according to the New Prussian Fortress System, Rastatt adapted to the surrounding terrain. The focus of the defensive front laid in the west, south and east parts, while the north side was covered by the terrain.

==== Ulm ====
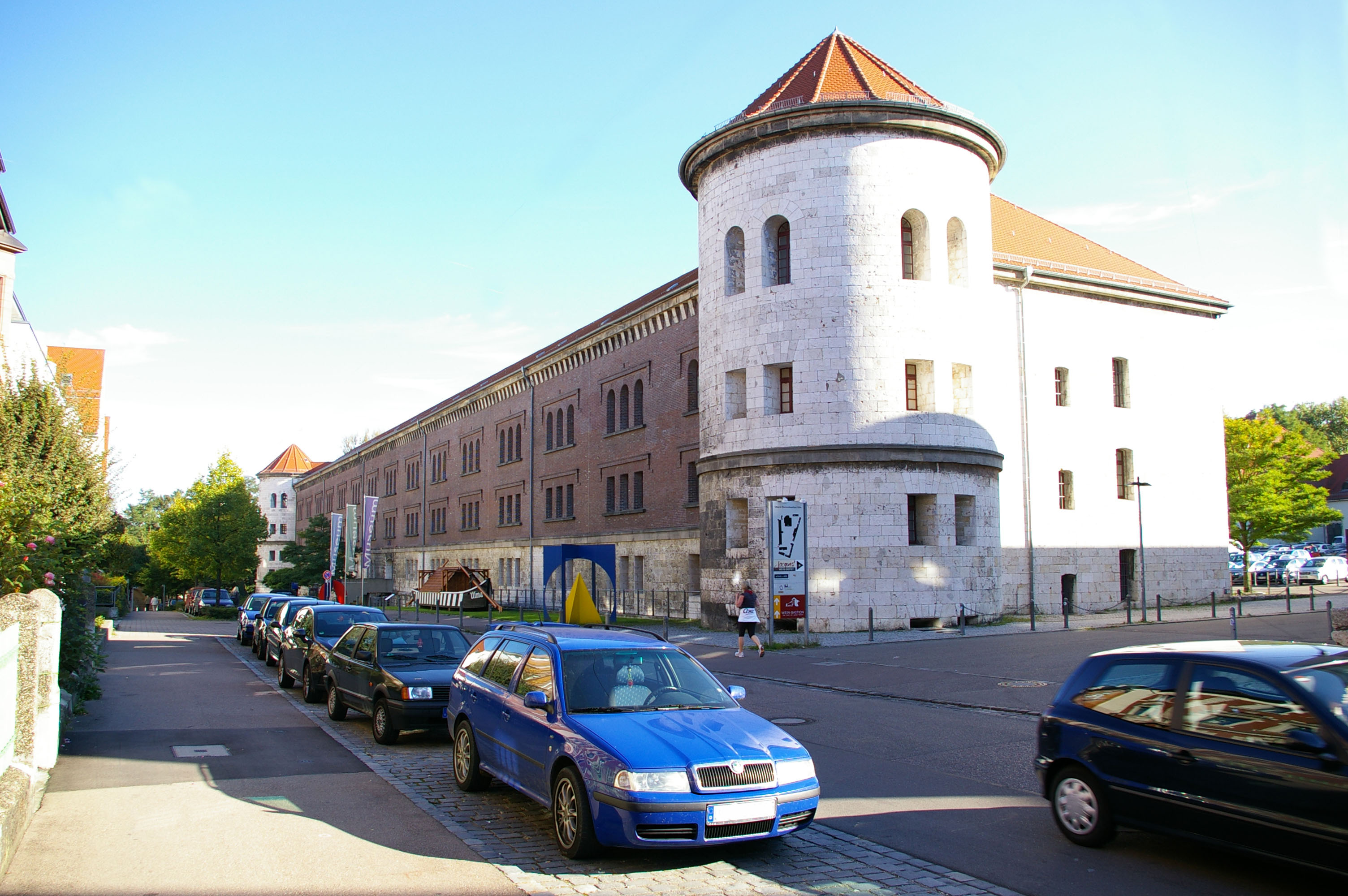
Reduit of the Obere Donaubastion in Ulm

The Fortress of Ulm was with the spread out defences on both sides of the Danube the central point and main training area for the defence of southern Germany. It was built as one of the biggest fortresses in Europe under the administration of the Prussian construction manager Moritz Karl Ernst von Prittwitz und Gaffron. It surrounded the cities of Ulm in Württemberg and Neu-Ulm in Bavaria and had 16 detached forts and an extensive moat system. In wartimes it was planned to place 20,000 men in the fortress – Ulm had at this time 16,000 citizens—an expansion to hold 100,000 men was planned. In peacetimes it was mostly occupied by 5,000 men of the federal army. As it was never armed in wartimes, the fortress was not designated for destruction after World War I and most works survived use as emergency shelters during World War II, so today about two thirds of the fortifications are preserved.

== Strategic planning ==
In 1859 Colburn's United Service Magazine published a review by a Prussian artillery officer that included are review of the German Confederation's western defences.

Germany was concerned that France might attempt a coup de main, and make a sudden invasion of south-west Germany through Alsace, with the use of rail transport to suddenly concentrate a large army in Strasbourg. It countered this possibility with the fortresses of Rastatt, Ulm, and Ingolstadt, that were built upon the German system of fortification, and were some of the strongest fortresses of Europe. Germany expected that a French army that attacked by this route would have to halt before Ulm and Rastatt. Bavaria, Württemberg, Baden, and the neighbouring States of the Confederation would then, under cover of those fortresses, keep the enemy in check for a time, until further German reinforcements could be summoned.

Germany possessed few fortresses in the south-west. Rastatt was the only stronghold on the frontier. 86 miles (140 km) in its rear laid Ulm, and 69 miles (112 km) beyond Ulm the fortress of Ingolstadt. These three points fell pretty nearly in a straight line drawn at a right angle from the middle of the Upper Rhine, eastward. North of Ulm, also a considerable distance from the Rhine, there was a fourth point, the fortress of Würzburg.

Rastatt commanded all the road on the right bank of the Rhine from Basel to the Main, and some of the passes of the Black Forest. Its especial importance consists in the fact that it gave greater strength to what was thought to be the almost impregnable position of Landau-Germersheim, and that it flanked every passage of the Rhine on the Alsace side. In 1859 Rastatt had not been provided with an entrenched camp, as was originally proposed, but in case of a sudden war with France, earthworks could have been thrown up which would compensate for that omission, but even without the entrenched camp, Rastatt was considered a formidable fortress.

Ulm with magnificent strategic position, no less than the technical completion of its works, place it beyond a par with any other fortress in Europe (excepting perhaps Verona). Ulm, moreover, had an immense entrenched camp, capable of holding 100,000 men; an army concentrated there could take the offensive in many directions.

Strategically, Ingolstadt was not so well placed as Ulm; it was, however, a second string for a German a bow, as it would have to be taken to open the path to the Danube. Its fortifications were very strong and if strengthened by a retreating army would prove difficult to take quickly.

Along the valley of the Rhine excellent roads ran on both sides. Between Mainz and Strasbourg the number of these roads both on the right and left bank is most considerable. For the defence of the Middle and Lower Rhine and the adjacent territories, Germany had nine fortresses. Of these, six—Wesel, Cologne, Coblenz, Mainz, Germersheim, and Landau, were the real Rhine fortresses; the remaining three — Luxemburg and Saarlouis in the South, and Jülich in the North of the German Rhineland, shelter it in some measure against the French, Belgian, and Dutch frontier. The grouping of these fortresses, and the fact that the first named places are much stronger than the latter, shows that the German system of fortification was founded on quite different principles than that of the French in the north east. Germany never made the attempt to keep its frontier hermetically closed, as it were, by a number of small forts, which, indeed, would have been impracticable, considering the number of roads that there were. It had simply withdrawn further inland, leaving the rest to a large army in the field, which, supported by the admirable Rhine fortresses, could soon advance against an invading enemy in any direction, and even if beaten at first, could manage to hold its ground on the Rhine until reinforcements should arrive.

This object had been attained by the erection of the chief fortresses on the Rhine: Cologne, Coblenz, Mainz, and Germersheim, as great entrenched camps. Of these four places, all of which were connected by strong works with the right bank of the Rhine, each was looked upon as almost impregnable. It is true they required strong garrisons—together, a considerable army. But without considering that Germany was never badly off for soldiers, it also implies a proportionate strength of the invading army. As long as 150,000 to 200,000 men were concentrated in or near these four points, and as long as none of them is taken, no French army, under 300,000 strong, could attempt to cross the Rhine between Lauterburg and Wesel. The Rhine-line from Germersheim to Coblenz was the strongest. There Landau and Germersheim close the valley of the Rhine on the left hand completely on the Strasbourg side, as on this point 100,000 men could easily have held their own for a long time against very superior numbers.

The weakest point in this area was between Wesel and Cologne, but it was considered that the vicinity of the Dutch frontier rendered an attack on that side improbable; moreover, the position of Wesel there on the right bank offers great advantages. But by this date no great strategic importance was attached to Luxemburg, by the German artillery officer who composed the report in the German Quarterly Review, because of its somewhat isolated position, and because, despite its strength, by 1859 it was rather outdated, and its strategic position was neutralized by the proximity of the French fortresses of Thionville, Metz, Verdun, Longwy, and Montmédy. Jülich and Saar-Louis were of still less strategic importance.

The review also mentioned possible attacks from the south either through Austria (who it was assumed would fight as an ally of Germany which had its own strategic fortresses of Mantua and Verona, or the possibility of France attacking through Switzerland either by invading Switzerland or through Switzerland renouncing neutrality and siding with France. The Germans intended to rely on politics and natural features to defend against such an attack, probably by fielding a large field army in the area between upper Neckar, the upper Danube, and the Iller. If the French were to attack through Belgium the Germans expected the Fortress of Antwerp to hold out as a National Reduit until the Germans could mount a counter attack.
