= Fortress of Ulm =

Coordinates: 48°24′43″N 9°58′58″E

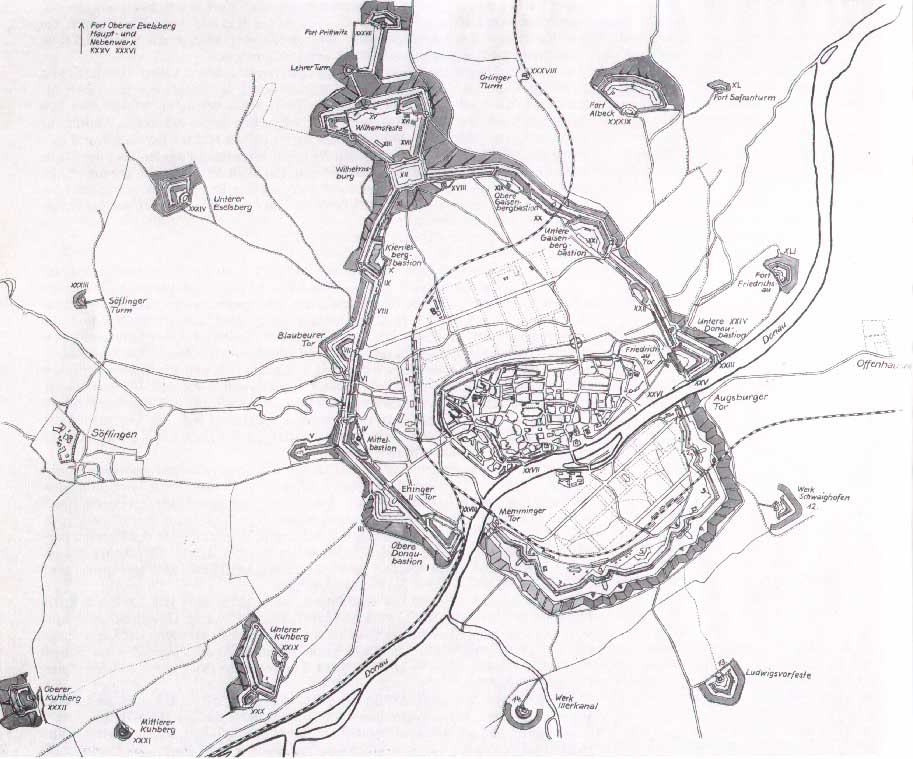
Plan of the Bundesfestung Ulm

The fortress of Ulm (Bundesfestung Ulm) was one of five federal fortresses of the German Confederation around the cities of Ulm and Neu-Ulm. With its 9 km polygonal main circumvallation Ulm had the biggest fortress in Germany and Europe in the 19th century and it is still one of the biggest in Europe.

After the final defeat of Napoleon in 1815, the victorious powers agreed to defend the states from the inside. The fortresses were one of the few realised projects of the confederation. The fortress Ulm was planned by the Prussian construction manager Moritz Karl Ernst von Prittwitz und Gaffron and built under his supervision between 1842 and 1859.

In peacetimes the fortress should hold 5,000 men of the federal army, in wartimes up to 20,000 soldiers. A plan to expand the fortress to hold 100,000 men was never realised. The building costs were valued at 16,5 mio. guilders.

The fortress is a closed, polygonal wall system around the cities of Ulm in the Kingdom of Württemberg and Neu-Ulm in the Kingdom of Bavaria. In some distance detached works were added. The at this time first stone bridge across the Danube laid between both cities inside of the fortress. The next stone bridge was in Regensburg.

For the first time the bastion system was given up and replaced by a polygonal system with detached works, which is called Neupreußische Manier (New Prussian Fortress System) or Neudeutsche Manier (New German Fortress System). The later constructed works at the upper Eselsberg were built as so-called "Biehler-Forts".

== List of works ==
=== Ulm ===
==== City circumvallation ====
Work No.	Name	Built	Today's shape
I	Obere Donaubastion	1843–55	Reduit preserved, ramparts demolished in 1914
II	Curtain wall with Ehinger Tor	1843–55	Inner Gate Ehingen and parts of the middle gate preserved, all other parts were demolished in 1903–04
III	Ravelin before Ehinger Tor	1843–55	Completely levelled 1903–04
IV	Middle Bastion	1843–55	Reduit preserved, remainder demolished in 1903–04
V	Blau flèche	1843–55	Completely levelled 1903–04
VI	Curtain wall with Blaubeurer Tor	1843–55	Inner gate and 100 m of the curtain wall preserved, all other parts were demolished in 1903/04
VII	Ravelin before Blaubeurer Tor	1843–55	Completely levelled 1903–04
VIII	Curtain wall to the Kienlesberg	1843–55	Completely levelled 1903–04
IX	Counterguard Kienlesberg	1843–52	Part of the Gate Ruhetal preserved, all other parts were demolished in 1903–04
X	Kienlesbergbastion	1843–52	Nearly completely preserved
XI	West mountain front	1843–52	Nearly completely preserved
XII	Wilhelmsburg	1842–48	Completely preserved
XIII	Left feeder line	1852–57	Completely preserved
XIV	Left redoubt	1852–57	Completely preserved
XV	Curtain wall between the redoubts	1852–57	Completely preserved
XVI	Right redoubt	1852–57	Completely preserved
XVII	Right feeder line	1852–57	Completely preserved
XVIII	East mountain front	1843–58	Nearly completely preserved
XIX	Obere Gaisenbergbastion	1843–58	Nearly completely preserved, but right side was demolished in 1904
XX	Curtain wall	1843–58	Only the caponniere is preserved, all other parts were demolished in 1916
XXI	Untere Gaisenbergbastion	1843–58	Just the double caponniere and parts of the escarped are preserved, all other parts were demolished in 1962
XXII	Curtain Wall to the Untere Donaubastion with Stuttgarter Tor and Friedrichsautor	1845–55	Only the glacis is preserved, all other parts were demolished in 1903–04
XXIII	Counterguard Untere Donaubastion	1845–55	Completely levelled
XXIV	Untere Donaubastion	1845–55	Reduit preserved, all other parts were demolished
XXV	Oberer Donauturm	1845–55	Completely preserved
XXVI	Obere Stadtkehle with Ländetor	1845–55	Partially preserved
XXVII	Untere Stadtkehle	1843–55	Partially preserved
XXVIII	Unterer Donauturm	1843–55	Completely preserved

==== Forts ====
Work No.	Name	Built	Today's shape
XXIX	Unterer Kuhberg	1846–58	Nearly completely preserved, area built-up
XXX	Horn work	1846–58	Completely preserved
XXXI	Mittlerer Kuhberg	1855–57	Ruined in 1944 by an explosion caused by a supposed blind shell, ruins demolished in 1962.
XXXII	Oberer Kuhberg^{1}	1848–57	Completely preserved
XXXIII	Söflinger Turm	1855–56	Preserved, but ruinous
XXXIV	Unterer Eselsberg	1848–56	Completely preserved
XXXV^{2}	Oberer Eselsberg Subwork	1883–87	Completely preserved
XXXVI^{3}	Lehrer Turm	1848–50	Demolished in 1876–78
XXXVI	Oberer Eselsberg Main work	1883–87	Only parts of it are preserved, most of the fort was demolished in 1971.
XXXVII	Prittwitz (first named Avancé)	1847–54	Completely preserved
XXXVIII	Örlinger Turm	1850–52	Completely preserved
XXXIX	Albeck	1846–59	Preserved, but ruinous
XL	Safranberg	1855–58	Completely preserved
XLI	Friedrichsau	1852–54	Nearly completely preserved

^{1}) The Fort Oberer Kuhberg was also an early concentration camp between 1933 and 1935. One well-known prisoner was the SPD politician Kurt Schumacher.

^{2}) That work no. was planned to be a turret in the Ruhe valley, which was not built for financial reasons.

^{3}) The work no. was passed to Fort Oberer Eselsberg Hauptwerk in 1881.

=== Neu-Ulm ===
==== City circumvallation ====
Name	Built	Today's shape
Half bastion 1 with Augsburger Tor	1844–54	Train pillbox, parts of the glacis and one flank battery preserved, all other parts were demolished in 1958–60
Curtain wall with caponniere 2	1844–54	Gradually demolished between 1903 and 1958
Bastion 3	1844–54	Gradually demolished between 1903 and 1958
Curtain wall with caponniere 4	1844–54	Demolished before 1945, the caponniere was restored in 2006–08
Bastion 5 with war hospital	1844–54	Nearly completely preserved
Curtain wall with caponniere 6	1844–54	Completely preserved
Bastion 7 with powder magazine II	1844–54	Completely preserved
Curtain wall with caponniere 8	1844–54	Nearly completely preserved
Half bastion 9 with Memminger Tor	1844–54	Nearly completely preserved

==== Forts ====
Name	Built	Today's shape
12 Schwaighofen	1850–53	Nearly completely preserved, but deformed by additional buildings
13 Ludwigsvorfeste	1850–53	Completely preserved
14 Illerkanal	1850–53	Completely preserved

The fort 10 (near Offenhausen) and the gun turret 11 on the railroad Ulm – Munich were not built for cost reasons. The plans for work XLI Friedrichsau had to be changed for this. Work 14 was to be work 15, between 13 and 15 a small fort was planned and later also canceled. The fort Illerkanal was nameless until the completion of the Iller channel in 1906. An additional fort near Pfuhl was planned in the mid-1860s, but cancelled due to the dissolution of the German Confederation. Instead of the fort the infantry base Kapellenberg was built in the 1900s (see below).

=== Expansion of fortification between 1881 and 1914 ===
As the weapons were improved, the fortress had to be improved too. On Fort Oberer Kuhberg, the front wall and side towers were reduced in height, and around many forts, infantry fences were installed. Two new forts were built on the Eselsberg (see #Forts).

==== 1901–1910 ====
Between 1901 and 1910 several new buildings were constructed to support the fortress. These buildings were (beginning with Böfingen and moving counterclockwise around Ulm):

Name	Built	Location	Today's shape
Infantry base Böfingen	1903–04	Alfred-Delp-Weg, Böfingen	Completely demolished
Infantry base Haslach	1901–02	Heidenheimer Straße, east of Örlingen	Completely demolished
Infantry base Jungingen east	1901–02	east of Albstraße, Jungingen	Overbuilt
Infantry base Jungingen center	1901–02	Albstraße / Franzenhauser Weg, Jungingen	Completely demolished
Infantry base Jungingen west	1901–02	Stuttgarter Straße, Jungingen	Completely demolished
Infantry base Spitzäcker	1908–10	Lerchenfeldstraße, north of Lehr	Completely demolished
Infantry base Lehr	1905–07	Tobelstraße, west of Lehr	Completely demolished
Infantry base Weinberge	1901–02	east of Heilmeyersteige, Eselsberg	Completely demolished
Infantry base Gleißelstetten	1901–02	Hasensteige, Söflingen	Completely demolished
Infantry base Kapellenberg	1907–09	Narzissenweg, Pfuhl	Overbuilt

==== 1914–1916 ====
The last major expansion of the front line took place in the first years of World War I. 93 works were to be built or improved, the majority of them were never actually constructed or completed. The numbering began with the trench 1 between Obertalfingen and Böfingen, went counterclockwise around Ulm and Neu-Ulm and ended with trench 78 on the other side of the Danube. Between the bases 21 and 22 was the trench 21a. In the south an own front line was to be installed, consisting of the bases 3c near Ludwigsfeld and 2b south of Wiblingen, and the trenches 2a, 3a, 3a II, 4a, 4a II, 1b, 1b II, 3b, 4b, 1c and 2c.

74 of these works were to be trenches. The works 3, 8, 14, 18, 21, 37, 45, 54, 58, 63, 76, 2b and 3c were to be infantry bases. Only the bases 45 in the Maienwäldle and 58 south of Neu-Ulm are completely preserved. The bases Spitzäcker, Lehr, Weinberge and Kapellenberg and the forts Oberer Eselsberg Hauptwerk and Oberer Eselsberg Nebenwerk were improved and integrated in the numbering system as works 22, 26, 32, 70, 29 and 30 respectively.

Furthermore 20 artillery rooms, 10 munition rooms, 4 pump stations and 9 so-called "Zwischenraumstreichen", which could cover long gaps between some works, were built behind the front lines. Of them only the pump station Buchbrunnen and the Zwischenraumstreiche 6 exist still today.

=== Infrastructure buildings ===
In Ulm and Neu-Ulm were several buildings bought or built for the garrisons.

Name or function	Built	Location
Fortress construction administration	Bought in 1842	Building Reichenauer Hof, Donaustraße, Ulm
Fortress construction yard	1845–48	Silcherstraße, Neu-Ulm
Commissariat Ulm	1860–62	Frauenstraße / Karlstraße, Ulm
Commissariat Neu-Ulm	1849–64	Silcherstraße / Krankenhausstraße, Neu-Ulm
Chevauxlegers barracks	1865–67	Flößerweg / Silcherstraße, Neu-Ulm
Karl barracks	1860–63	Between Karlstraße, Zeitblomstraße, Syrlinstraße and Keplerstraße, Ulm
Kienlesberg barracks	1865–68	Kienlesbergstraße, Ulm
Maximilian barracks	1860–67	Between Maximilianstraße, Kasernstraße, Bahnhofstraße and Ludwigstraße, Neu-Ulm
Schiller barracks	1882–91	Between Böblinger Straße and Söflinger Straße, Ulm
Sedan barracks	1909–16	Between Sedanstraße and Wörthstraße, Ulm
Hospital Gaisenberg	1862–66	Eythstraße / Prittwitzstraße, Ulm
Hospital Neu-Ulm	1862–66	Krankenhausstraße, Neu-Ulm
Imperial fortification	1876–79	Between Zeitblomstraße and Schaffnerstraße, Ulm
Military prison	1889	Frauenstraße / Holzstraße, Ulm
Civilist prison	Around 1890	Talfinger Straße / Wielandstraße, Ulm
Protestant garrison church	1908–10	Frauenstraße, Ulm
Catholic garrison church	1902–04	Frauenstraße / Olgastraße, Ulm

Furthermore several officer's messes, powder magazines, artillery depots and the like were erected. Some of the buildings still stand today, but are used differently with exceptions: The civilian prison is still in use today as a place of detention and the churches were opened for the citizens as Pauluskirche (Protestant) and St. Georg (catholic).

== Gallery ==
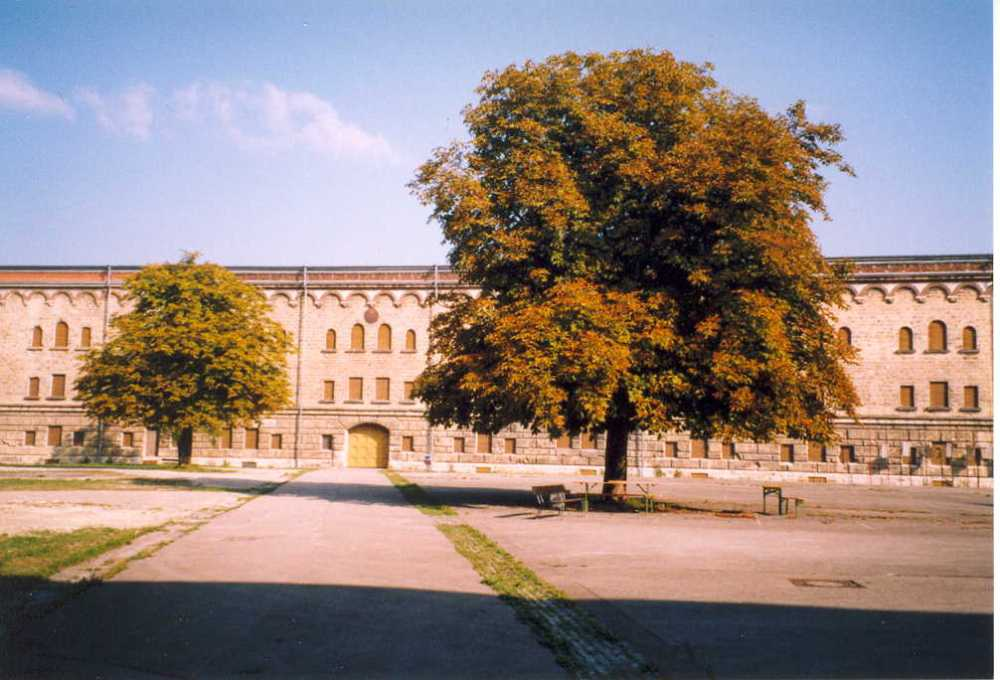
In the Wilhelmsburg

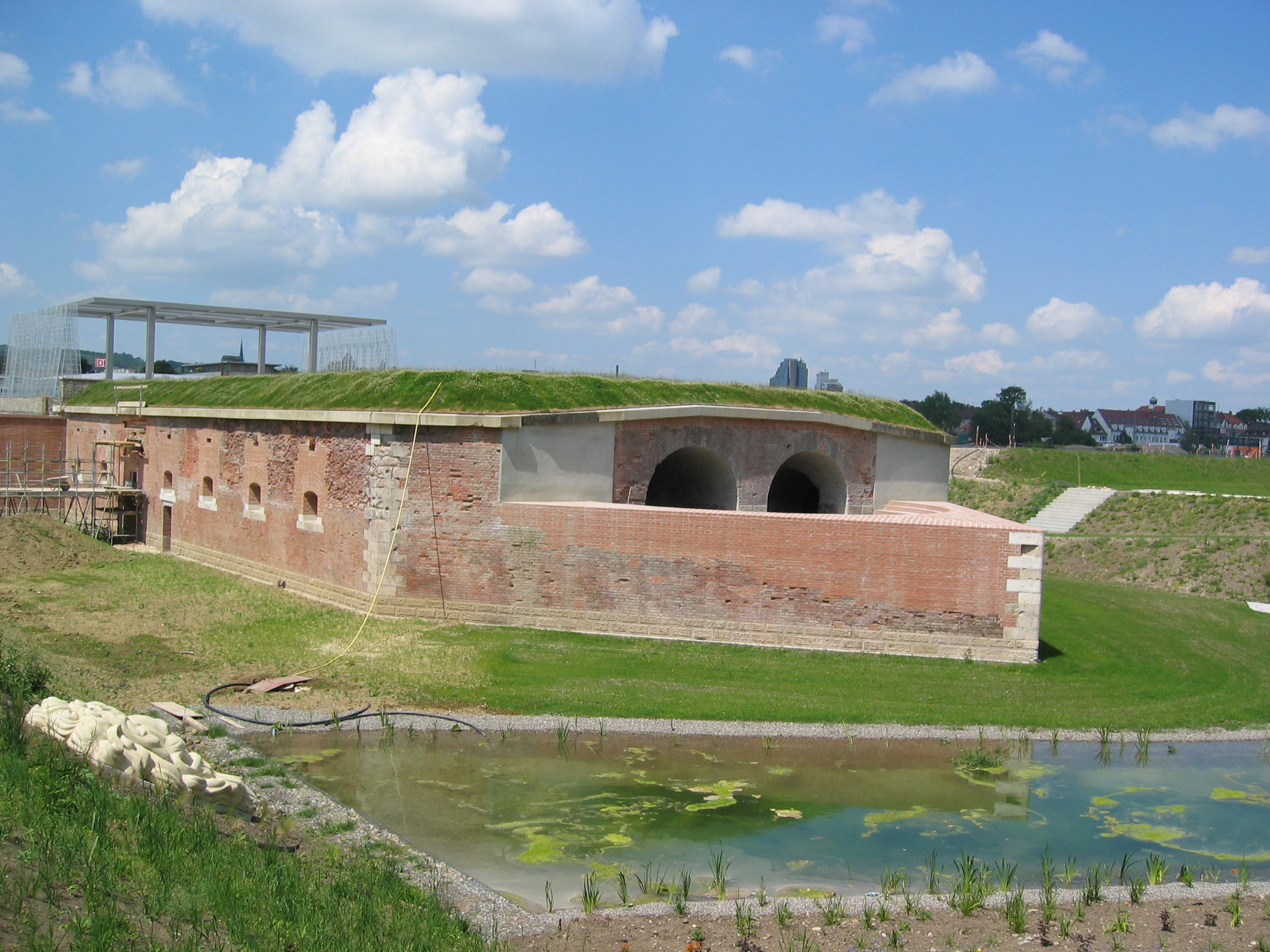
Caponniere 4 in Neu-Ulm

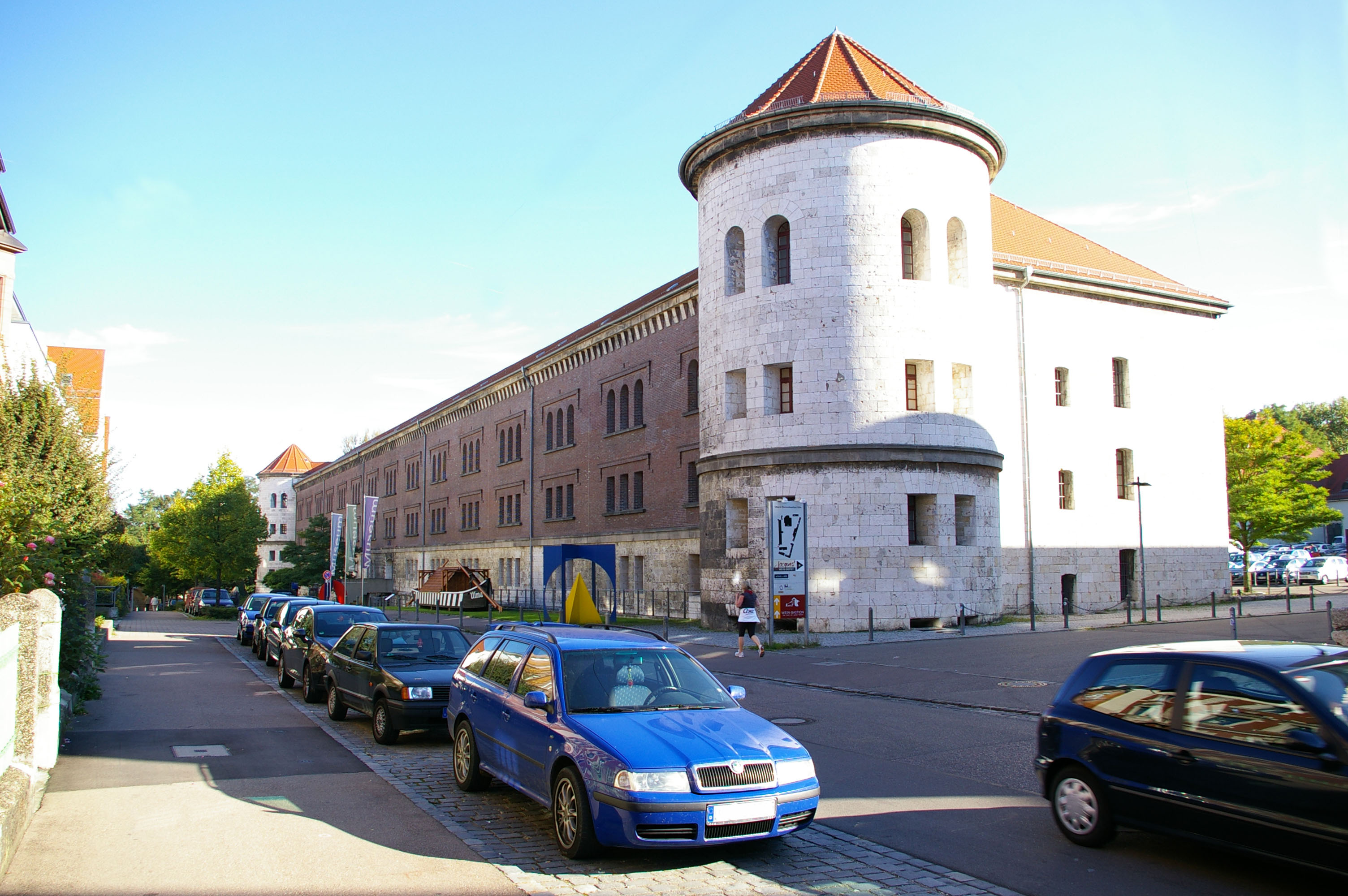
Obere Donaubastion in Ulm

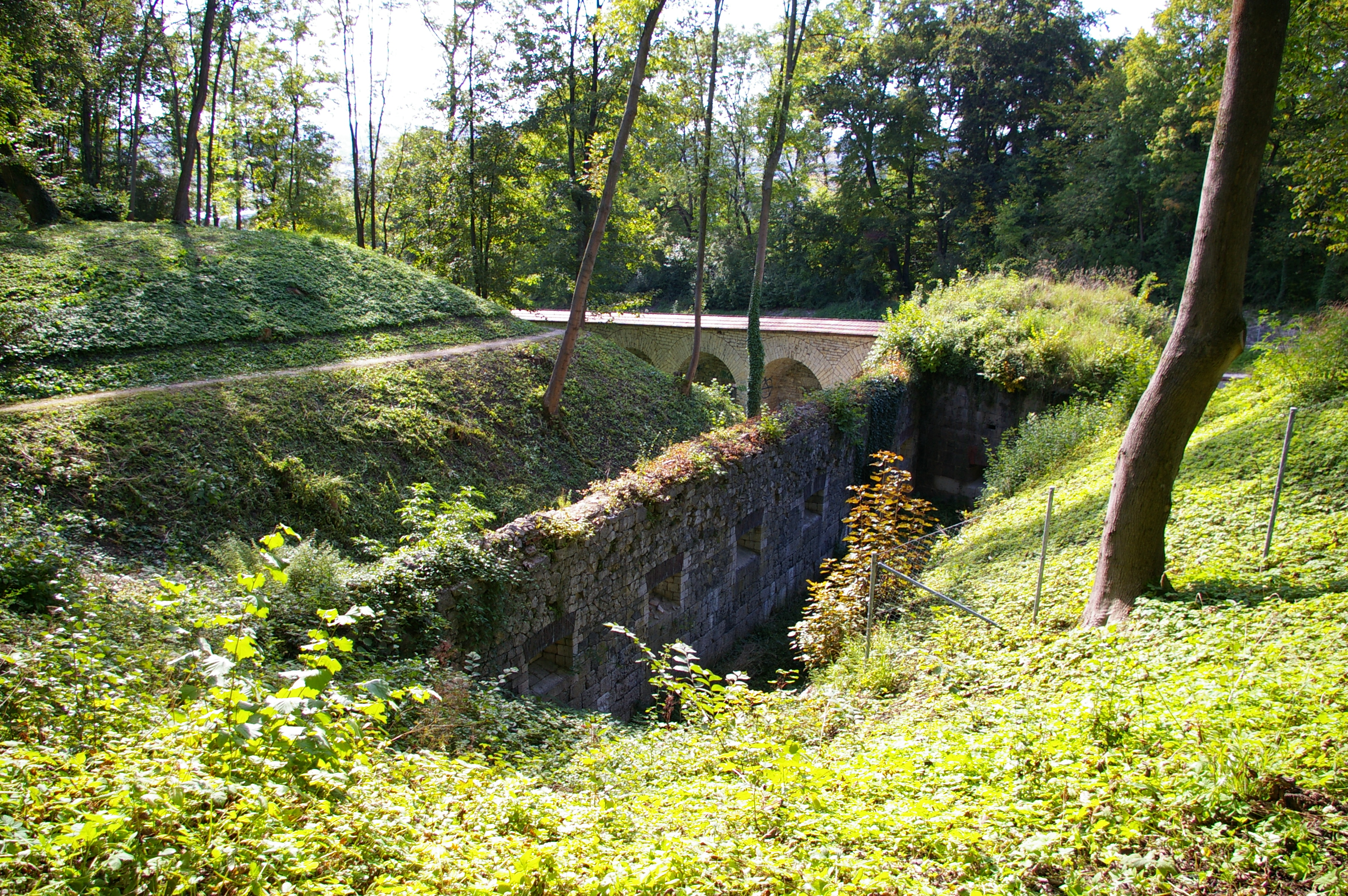
West mountain front below the Wilhelmsburg

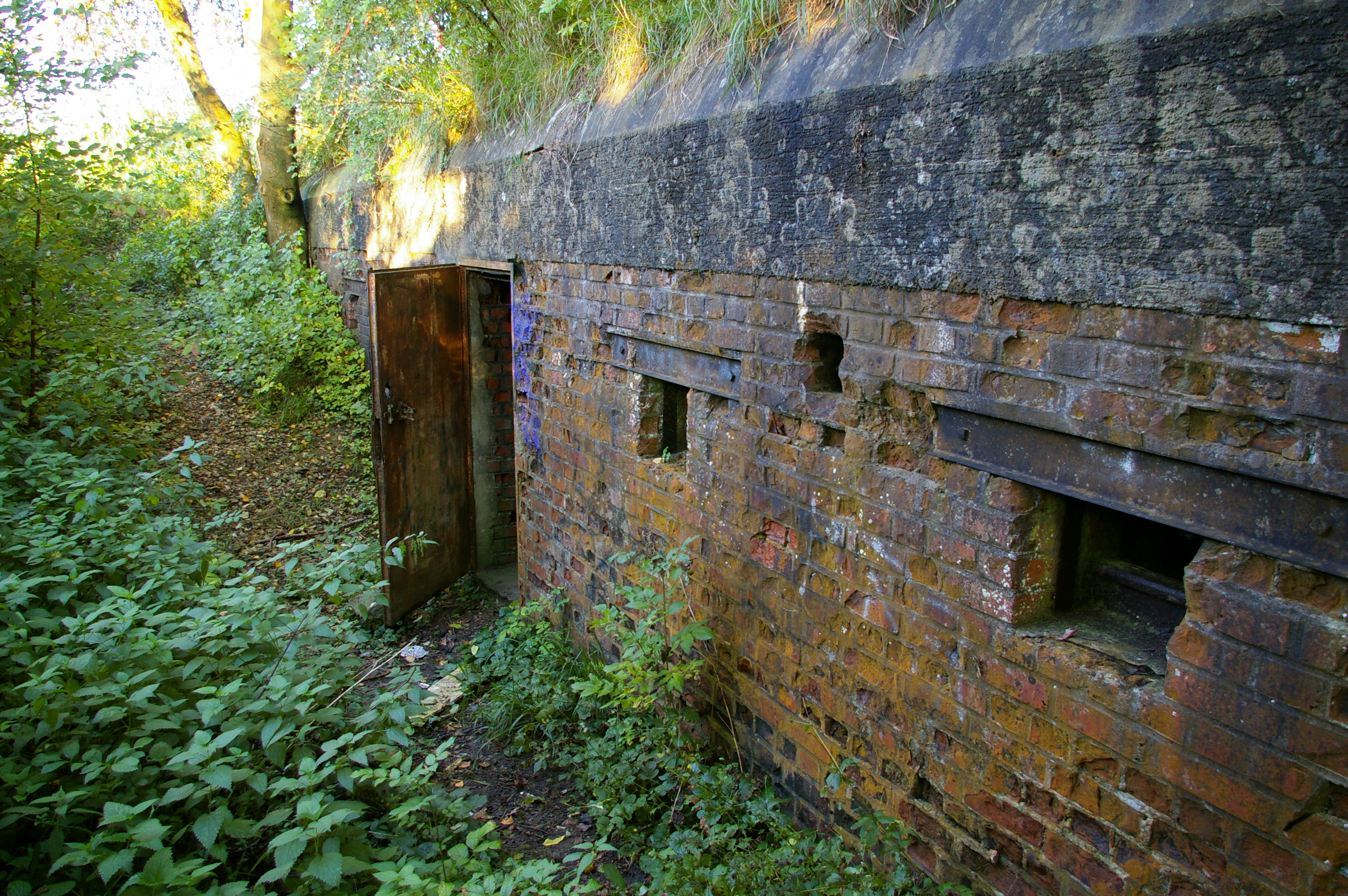
Base 58 von 1914 south of Neu-Ulm

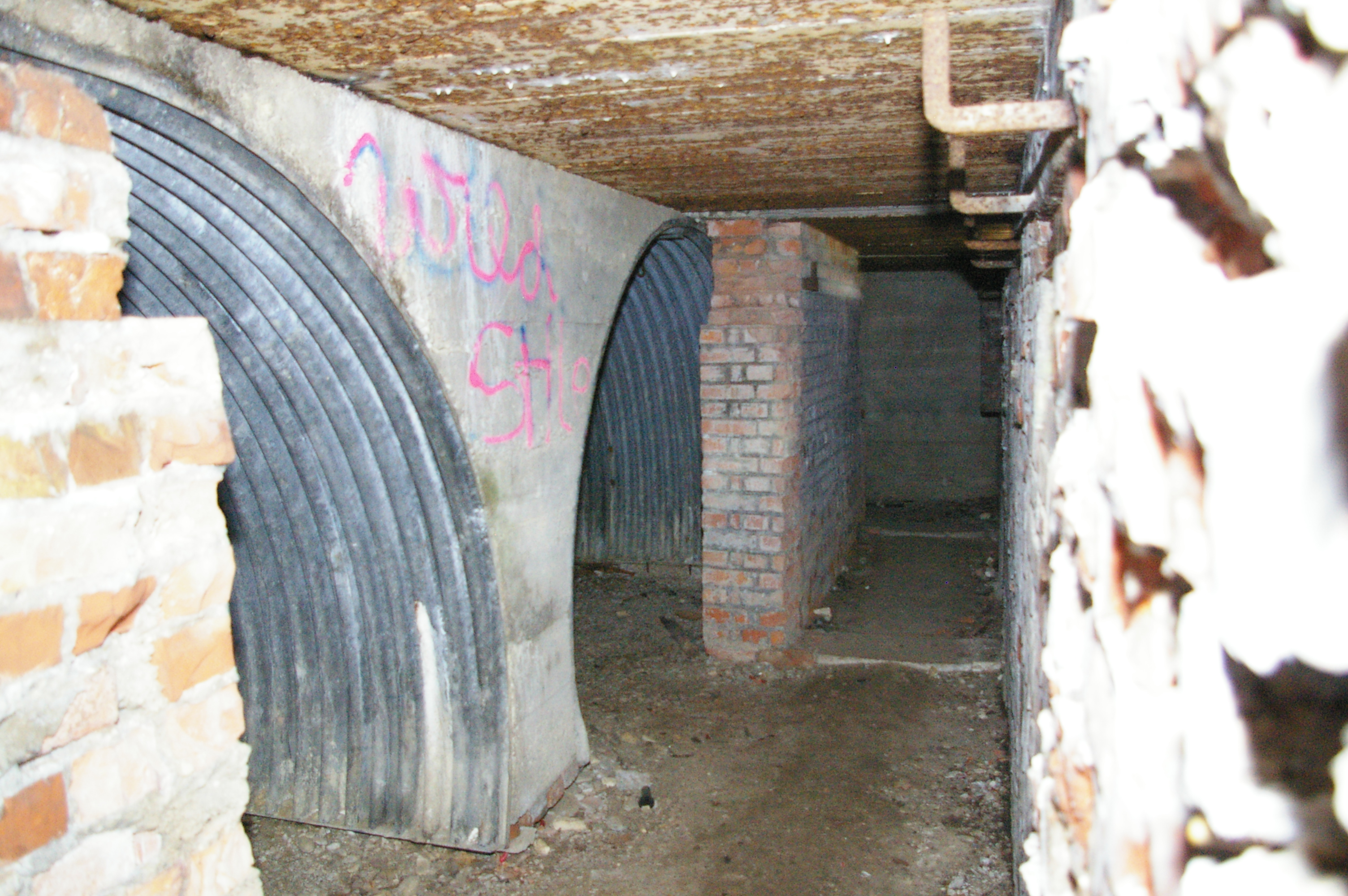
In the base 58
